= Midway =

Midway often refers to:

- Midway (fair), a place at a fair or circus where rides, entertainment, and booths are concentrated
- Midway Atoll, also called Midway Island, a low-lying coral atoll in the central Pacific Ocean
- Midway International Airport, in Chicago, United States

Midway may also refer to:

== Military ==
- Battle of Midway, a pivotal World War II battle fought around, on, and in the air above Midway Atoll (June 1942)
- Naval Air Facility Midway Island, a U.S. Naval Air Station in the Midway Atoll (1941–1993)
- USS Midway, the name of three different U.S. Navy ships:
  - USS Midway (AG-41), a cargo ship and troop transporter later renamed Panay (1942–1946)
  - USS Midway (CVE-63), an escort carrier later renamed St. Lo (1943–1944)
  - USS Midway (CV-41), an aircraft carrier (1945–1992)
    - USS Midway Museum, the museum including that carrier, located in San Diego, California
    - Midway-class aircraft carrier, a class of U.S. Navy aircraft carrier (three completed)

== Places ==
=== Canada ===
- Midway (Music Hall), a music venue in Edmonton, Alberta
- Midway, British Columbia, a village in the West Kootenay region
- Midway, New Brunswick, in Harvey Parish, New Brunswick
- The Midway, Toronto, a former unincorporated community annexed by Toronto in 1909

=== United Kingdom ===
- Midway, Derbyshire, a suburb of Swadlincote, South Derbyshire

=== United States ===
Communities

Listed alphabetically by state

- Midway, Alabama (disambiguation), multiple places
- Midway, Arkansas (disambiguation), multiple places
- Midway, California (disambiguation), multiple places
- Midway, Colorado, an unincorporated community in El Paso County
- Midway, Delaware, an unincorporated area in Sussex county
- Midway, Florida (disambiguation), multiple places
- Midway, Georgia, a city in Liberty County
  - Midway-Hardwick, a former community in Baldwin County, Georgia
- Midway, Illinois (disambiguation), multiple places
- Midway, Indiana (disambiguation), multiple places
- Midway, Iowa (disambiguation), multiple places
- Midway, Kansas (disambiguation), multiple places
- Midway, Kentucky (disambiguation), multiple places
- Midway, Louisiana (disambiguation), multiple places
- Midway, Minnesota (disambiguation), multiple places
- Midway, Mississippi (disambiguation), multiple places
- Midway, Missouri (disambiguation), multiple places
- Midway, Nebraska, on the Great Platte River Road
- Midway, New Mexico, census-designated place in Chaves County
- Midway, North Carolina, an incorporated town in Davidson County
  - Midway, Brunswick County, North Carolina, on North Carolina Highway 211
- Midway, Ohio, a village in Range Township, Madison County
- Midway, Oklahoma, an unincorporated community in Oklahoma
- Midway, Oregon (disambiguation), multiple places
- Midway, Pennsylvania (disambiguation), multiple places
- Midway, South Carolina, on South Carolina Highway 903
- Midway, South Dakota, in Minnehaha County
- Midway, Tennessee (disambiguation), multiple places
- Midway, Texas, a city in Madison County
  - Midway, Smith County, Texas, an unincorporated community in Smith County, Texas
- Midway, Utah, a city in Wasatch County
- Midway, Virginia (disambiguation), multiple places
- Midway, Washington, on the Washington State Route 516
- Midway, West Virginia (disambiguation), multiple places
- Midway, Wisconsin, an unincorporated community in La Crosse County

Other

- Midway Dragway, a one-eighth-mile (0.20 km) drag race facility in South Carolina
- Midway Geyser Basin, part of the geothermal areas of Yellowstone
- Midway Mountain, a summit in California
- Midway on High, a bar near the campus of Ohio State University
- Midway State Park, a park in Maple Springs, New York
- Midway University, an independent, liberal arts college in Midway, Kentucky
- Midway Congregational Church, Midway, Georgia
- Midway Cemetery, Midway, Georgia

== People ==
- Midway (artist), Dutch music producer Ralphie B

== Arts, entertainment and media ==
=== Film and television ===
- Midway (1976 film), an American film about the battle, directed by Jack Smight
- Midway (2019 film), an American film about the battle, directed by Roland Emmerich
- "Midway" (Stargate Atlantis), an episode of Stargate Atlantis

=== Games ===
- Midway (1964 game), a board wargame by Avalon Hill based on the battle
- Midway (1991 game), a revised version of the 1964 board wargame by Avalon Hill
- Midway Campaign, a 1980 computer game about the battle published by Avalon Hill
- Midway Games, a video game developer and publisher
  - Midway Manufacturing, Midway Games' former identity as a pinball and arcade game manufacturer

=== Other arts, entertainment and media ===
- "Midway", a song by Sabaton from Coat of Arms
- Midway City, a fictional city in Big Bang's Knight Watchman comics

== See also ==
- Battle of Midway (disambiguation)
- Halfway (disambiguation)
- Medway (disambiguation)
- Middle way (disambiguation)
- Midway Airlines (disambiguation)
- Midway Airport (disambiguation)
- Midway City (disambiguation)
- Midway Drive-In (disambiguation)
- Midway Station (disambiguation), stations of the name
- Midway Township (disambiguation)
