= Medway (disambiguation) =

Medway is a conurbation and unitary authority in Kent, South East England.

Medway may also refer to:

== People ==
- Medway (DJ), Jesse Skeens, American DJ and record producer
- Baron Medway, courtesy title given to the eldest son of the Earl of Cranbrook
  - Gathorne Gathorne-Hardy, 1st Earl of Cranbrook (1814–1906), a British Conservative politician
  - John Gathorne-Hardy, 2nd Earl of Cranbrook (1839–1911), Conservative Member of Parliament

== Places ==
=== United Kingdom ===
- Medway (UK Parliament constituency), former county constituency
- Medway UTC, former name of a University Technical College in Chatham
- District of Medway, a former name of the City of Rochester-upon-Medway (1974–1979), Kent
- River Medway, in Sussex and Kent

=== United States ===
- Medway, Kansas, in Medway Township, Hamilton County, Kansas
- Medway, Maine, a town in Penobscot County
- Medway, Massachusetts, a town in Norfolk County
  - Medway station
- Medway, New York, see List of places in New York: M
- Medway, Ohio, an unincorporated community in Clark County
- Medway (Mount Holly, South Carolina), a plantation listed on the NRHP in South Carolina
- Medway, Vermont, former name of a town in Rutland County, Vermont, United States

=== Multiple countries ===
- Medway River (disambiguation)

=== Other places ===
- Medway, New South Wales, a village in the Southern Highlands, Australia
- Medway, Nova Scotia, a community in the Region of Queens Municipality, Canada
- Medway Creek (Ontario), Canada

== Aircraft ==
- Medway Microlights, a British aircraft manufacturer
- Rolls-Royce Medway, an early 1960s turbofan engine

== Rail transportation ==
- Medway (freight rail network), a private freight rail network in Europe owned by the Mediterranean Shipping Company

== Ships ==
- HMS Medway, various Royal Navy ships and a shore establishment
- Medway (1801 ship), launched at Fort William, Calcutta in 1801
- Medway (1810 ship), launched at Frindsbury in 1810
- Medway (1902), a four-masted barque built in 1902 by A. McMillan & Son, Dumbarton, Scotland

== See also ==
- Midway (disambiguation)
- Battle of the Medway, AD 43
- Raid on the Medway, AD 1667
