= Midway, West Virginia =

Midway may refer to the following communities in the U.S. state of West Virginia:

- Midway, Fayette County, West Virginia, an unincorporated community
- Midway, Mercer County, West Virginia, an unincorporated community
- Midway, Putnam County, West Virginia, an unincorporated community
- Midway, Raleigh County, West Virginia, an unincorporated community
