= Medway River =

Medway River may refer to:

- Medway River (Tasmania), Australia, a river of Tasmania
- Medway River, Nova Scotia, Canada
- Medway River, New Zealand
- Medway River (Georgia), United States

== See also ==
- River Medway, England
- River Medway (drag queen)
- Medway Creek (Ontario), Canada
- Medway (disambiguation)
- Midway River
