= Midway, Louisiana =

Midway, Louisiana may refer to the following places in the U.S. state of Louisiana:

- Midway, LaSalle Parish, Louisiana, a census-designated place
- Midway, Rapides Parish, Louisiana, an unincorporated community
- Midway, St. Mary Parish, Louisiana, an unincorporated community
- Midway, Webster Parish, Louisiana, an unincorporated community
