= Midway City (disambiguation) =

Midway City is a city in Orange County, California.

Midway City may also refer to:

- Midway City, a fictional city in the Big Bang Comics universe, known for being the home of Knight Watchman
- Midway City, a fictional city in the DC Comics universe, known for being the home of Hawkman (Katar Hol). It is set in the Midwestern United States

== See also ==
- Midway (disambiguation)
- Midway Township (disambiguation)
