= SS Friedrich Bischoff =

German-built cargo steamship

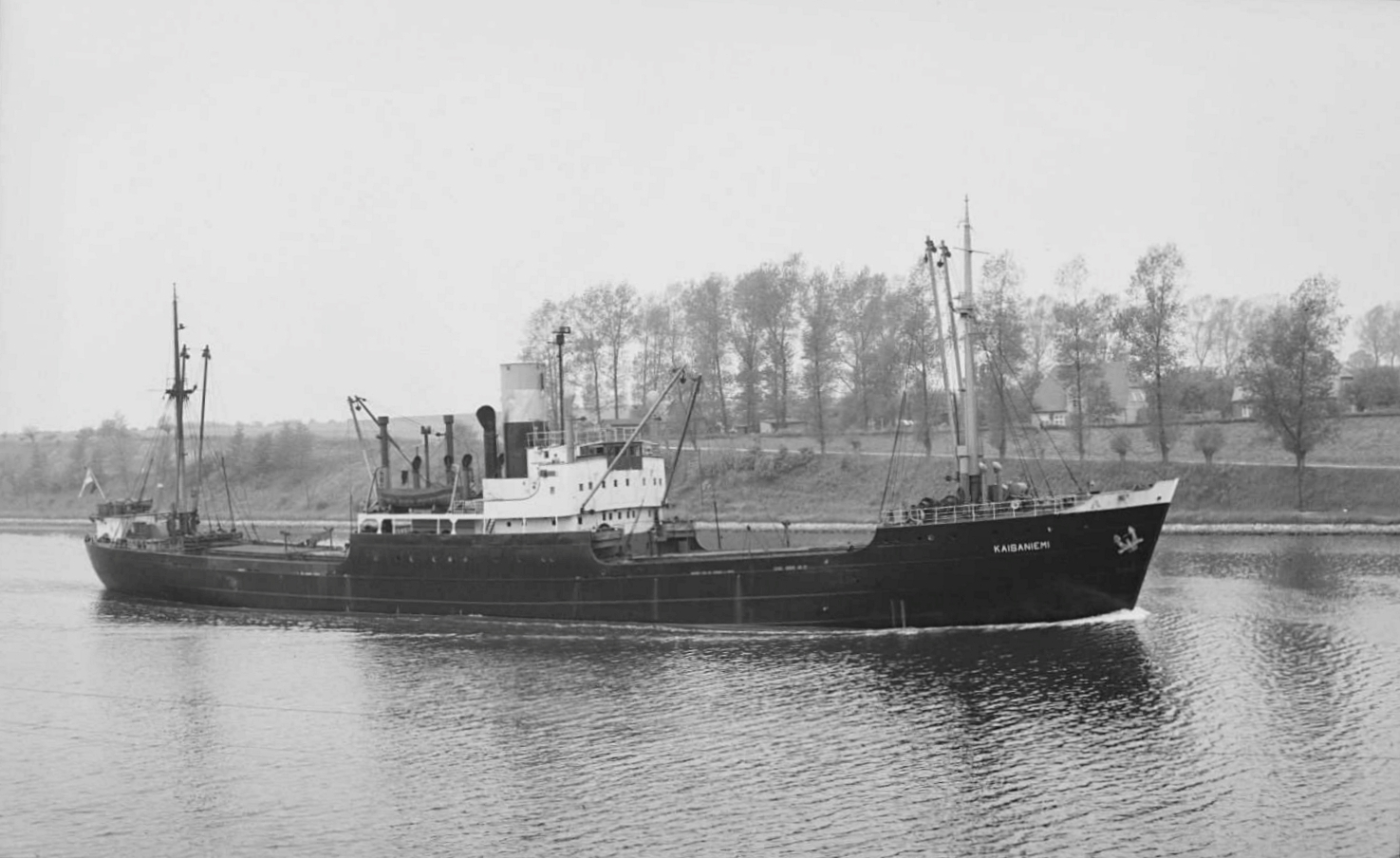
- The ship as Kaisaniemi, between 1951 and 1967

History
- Name: 1940: Friedrich Bischoff; 1945: Empire Consequence; 1951: Kaisaniemi
- Namesake: 1940: Friedrich Bischoff; 1941: Kaisaniemi, Helsinki
- Owner: 1940: Argo Reederei; 1945: Ministry of War Transport; 1945: Ministry of Transport; 1947: US Maritime Commission; 1948: Alaska Transportation Co; 1950: Norton Clapp; 1951: Etelä-Suomen Laiva O/Y
- Operator: 1940: Richard Adler & Co; 1940: Shipping & Coal Co Ltd; 1951: Polttoaine Osuuskunta; 1959: KS Laaksonen; 1961: Etelä-Suomen Laiva O/Y
- Port of registry: 1940: (Nazi Germany); 1945: (United Kingdom) London; 1947: (United States); 1948: (United States) Tacoma; 1950: (United States) Seattle; 1951: (Finland) Helsinki
- Builder: Lübecker Maschinenbau, Lübeck
- Completed: 1940
- Identification: 1945: UK official number 180707; 1945: call sign GFSX; by 1948: US official number 254984; by 1949: call sign WVMP; 1951: Finnish official number 1098; 1951: call sign OFRB
- Fate: Scrapped in 1967

General characteristics
- Type: cargo ship
- Tonnage: 1,998 GRT, 1,065 NRT
- Length: 318 ft 2 in (96.98 m) overall; 303.7 ft (92.6 m) registered
- Beam: 43.4 ft (13.2 m)
- Draft: 17 ft 8 in (5.38 m)
- Depth: 14.9 ft (4.5 m)
- Decks: 1
- Ice class: 1A
- Installed power: 1 × compound engine + exhaust steam turbine; 150 NHP
- Propulsion: 1 × screw
- Speed: 12 knots (22 km/h)
- Sensors & processing systems: by 1948: echo sounding device; by 1952: radar added; by 1954: wireless direction finding added; by 1959: gyrocompass added

SS Friedrich Bischoff was a cargo steamship. She was built in Germany in 1940. The United Kingdom seized her in 1945, and renamed her Empire Consequence. In 1947 she was transferred to the United States Maritime Commission. In 1951 a Finnish company bought her and renamed her Kaisaniemi. She was scrapped in Norway in 1967.

== Building and description ==
Lübecker Maschinenbau in Lübeck built the ship in 1940 for Argo Reederei. She was named after Friedrich Bischoff (1861–1920), who in 1896 had founded Argo Reederei. Her lengths were 318 ft 2 in (96.98 m) overall and 303.7 ft (92.6 m) registered. Her beam was 43.4 ft (13.2 m); her depth was 14.9 ft (4.5 m), and her draft was 17 ft 8 in (5.38 m). Her tonnages were 1,998 GRT and 1,065 NRT.

She had a single screw. Ottensener Eisenwerk in Ottensen, Hamburg, made her main engine, which was a four-cylinder compound engine. She also had an exhaust steam turbine, which drove the same propeller shaft via double reduction gearing and a Föttinger fluid coupling. The combined power of her reciprocating engine and turbine was rated at NHP, and gave her a speed of 12 knots (22 km/h).

== Career ==
On 13 December 1943, an Allied air raid on Bremen sank Friedrich Bischoff. In 1944 she was raised and repaired.

In May 1945 the Allies seized Friedrich Bischoff at Copenhagen. The UK Ministry of War Transport took ownership of her; renamed her Empire Consequence; and registered her in London. Her official number was 180707, and her call sign was GFSX. The Shipping and Coal Company of London were her managers.

On 7 April 1947, the ship was transferred to the United States Maritime Commission. She was laid up in the Hudson River. On 8 March 1948 the Alaska Transportation Company bought her. By June 1948 she was equipped with an echo sounding device. By January 1949 she was registered in Tacoma, and her US official number was 254984. By January 1950 her call sign was WVMP. Also in 1950, Norton Clapp bought the ship, and registered her in Seattle.

In 1951 Etelä-Suomen Laiva O/Y bought Empire Consequence, and renamed her after the Kaisaniemi district of central Helsinki. She was registered in Helsinki; her Finnish official number was 1098; and her call sign was OFRB. She was equipped with radar by 1952; wireless direction finding by 1954, and a gyrocompass and radiotelephone by 1959. Polttoaine Osuuskunta managed her until 1959, and then KS Laaksonen managed her until 1961. Thereafter, Etelä-Suomen Laiva managed her themselves. In 1962 the ship was given ice class 1A, and she was transferred from Lloyd's Register to Det Norske Veritas. She was scrapped at Grimstad in Norway in 1967.

== Bibliography ==
- Bureau of Customs (1949). Merchant Vessels of the United States. Washington, DC: United States Government Publishing Office – via HyperWar.
- Bureau of Customs (1950). Merchant Vessels of the United States. Washington, DC: United States Government Publishing Office – via HyperWar.
- Lloyd's Register of Shipping. Vol. I.–Steamers and Motorships of 300 tons gross and over. London: Lloyd's Register of Shipping. 1945 – via Southampton City Council.
- Lloyd's Register of Shipping. Vol. Steamers and Motorships of 300 tons gross and over. London: Lloyd's Register of Shipping. 1946 – via Internet Archive.
- Lloyd's Register of Shipping. Vol. I. A–L Steamers, Motorships, Sailing Vessels, &c. London: Lloyd's Register of Shipping. 1948 – via Internet Archive.
- Mercantile Navy List. London: Registrar General of Shipping and Seamen. 1947 – via Crew List Index Project.
- Mitchell, WH; Sawyer, LA (1995). The Empire Ships. London, New York, Hamburg, Hong Kong: Lloyd's of London Press Ltd. ISBN 1-85044-275-4.
- Register Book. Vol. I. A–L. London: Lloyd's Register of Shipping. 1951 – via Internet Archive.
- Register Book. Vol. I. A–L. London: Lloyd's Register of Shipping. 1954 – via Internet Archive.
- Register of Ships. London: Lloyd's Register of Shipping. 1959 – via Internet Archive.
