= USS Midway =

USS Midway may refer to the following ships of the United States Navy:

- USS Midway (AG-41), which was named Oritani and then Tyree before being chartered as a general auxiliary in 1942, renamed to Panay in 1943, and returned to its owner in 1946
- USS Midway (CVE-63), which was an escort carrier commissioned in 1943, renamed St. Lo one year later, and sunk during the Battle of Leyte Gulf shortly afterward
- USS Midway (CV-41), which is an aircraft carrier commissioned in 1945 and decommissioned in 1992. It was donated as a museum ship and resides in San Diego, California.

== See also ==
- Midway-class aircraft carrier
- Midway (disambiguation)
