= Midway, Missouri =

Midway may refer to the following places in the U.S. state of Missouri:

- Midway, Boone County, Missouri, an unincorporated community
- Midway, Lewis County, Missouri, an unincorporated community
- Midway, Oregon County, Missouri, an unincorporated community
- Midway, Joplin, a former village located in northern Newton County
