= USNS Grommet Reefer =

Cargo ship of the United States Navy

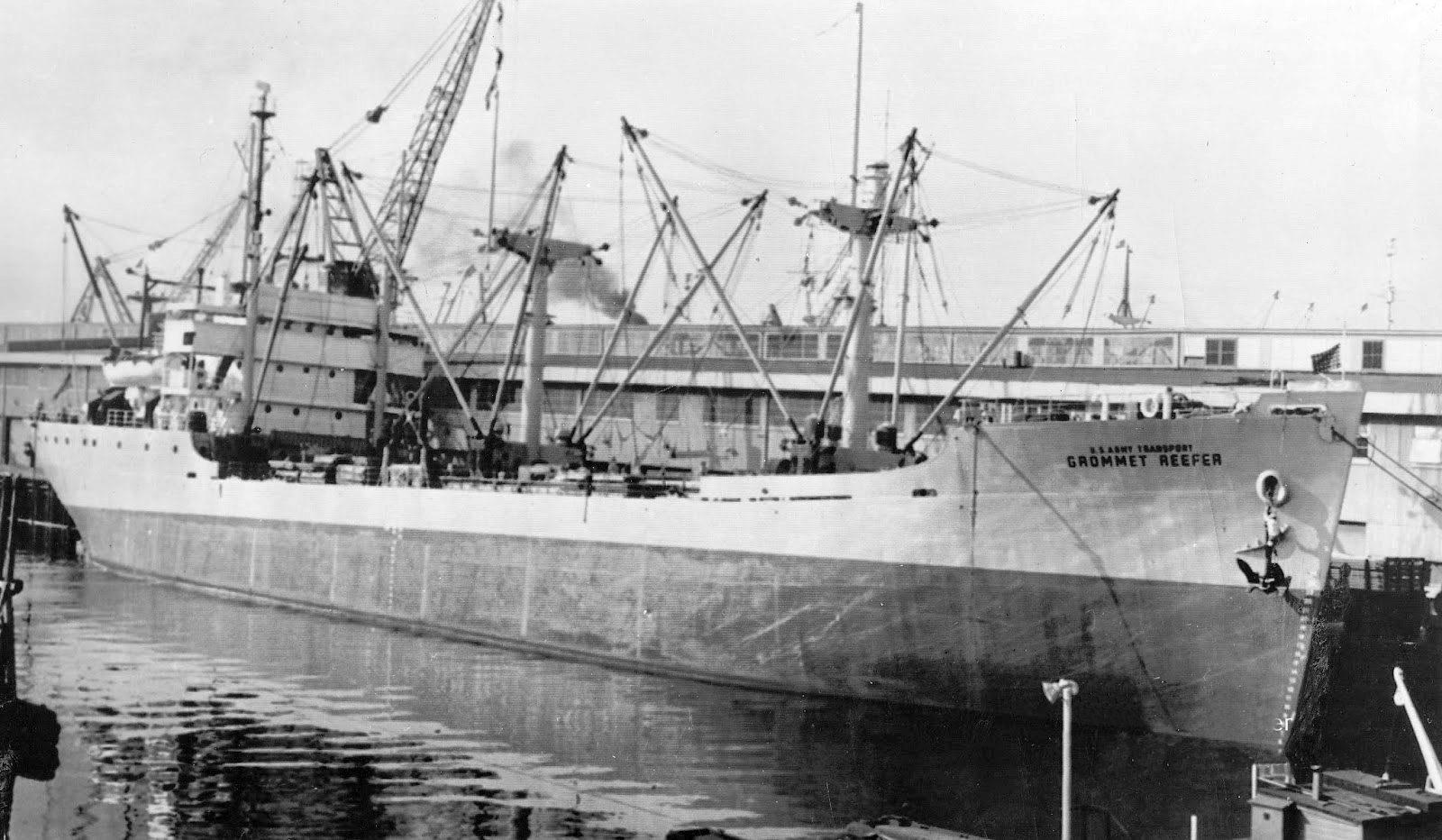

History

United States
- Ordered: as MV Kenneth E. Gruennert; C1-M-AV1 hull, MC hull 2243
- Laid down: 1 January 1944
- Launched: 29 July 1944
- Acquired: 1 March 1950
- In service: as USNS Grommet Reefer (T-AF-53); 1 March 1950
- Stricken: date unknown
- Fate: Ran aground, off Livorno, Italy, 15 December 1952

General characteristics
- Displacement: 2,382 t.(lt) 6,240 t.(fl)
- Length: 338 ft 8 in (103.23 m)
- Beam: 50 ft (15 m)
- Draught: 21 ft (6.4 m)
- Propulsion: Diesel, single propeller, 1,700shp
- Speed: 10.5 kts
- Complement: 40 civilian mariners
- Armament: none

USNS Grommet Reefer (T-AF-53) was a Grommet Reefer-class stores ship acquired by the U.S. Navy. Her task was to carry stores, refrigerated items, and equipment to ships in the fleet, and to remote stations and staging areas.

Grommet Reefer was laid down under Maritime Commission contract by Walter Butler Shipbuilders, Inc., Riverside Yard, Duluth, Minnesota, 1 January 1944: launched as Kenneth E. Gruennert 29 July 1944: sponsored by Mrs. Walter A. Blodsoe: and delivered to War Shipping Administration (WSA) December 1944 for use as a merchant cargo ship. Prior to 1950 she was owned by WSA and the Maritime Commission; and, as Kenneth E. Gruennert and later as Grommet Reefer, she was operated by several merchant lines, including Grace Lines, Inc.. and Alaska Transportation Company.

== Assigned to the Military Sea Transportation Service ==
Grommet Reefer was transferred to the Navy by the Maritime Commission 1 March 1950 and assigned to MSTS. Manned by a civilian crew, she operated in the Pacific Ocean out of U.S. West Coast ports, carrying military cargo and frozen and refrigerated foodstuffs. She steamed to American bases in the Marshalls, the Marianas, and other islands in the Western Pacific for more than a year. After returning to San Francisco, California, 25 March 1951, she departed for the U.S. East Coast 4 April and reached New York City 25 April.

== Operating in the Mediterranean and North Atlantic ==
Departing New York 29 June, Grommet Reefer sailed to the Mediterranean where she steamed to ports in North Africa and Italy before returning to New York 13 August. After completing a cargo run to Bremerhaven and back, she sailed 22 October for a 2-month deployment to the Mediterranean. From January to April 1952 she made three round-trip voyages to Western Europe, and during the next 2 months she supplied American bases in Labrador and Greenland.

== Running aground and breaking in two ==
Grommet Reefer resumed Mediterranean duty in September and operated between North Africa and Italy before returning to New York 10 November. After loading cargo, she departed for North Africa 5 days later. On 10 December she departed Casablanca, Morocco, for Livorno, Italy. Loaded with Army cargo, she went aground on a reef during a storm off Leghorn 15 December 1952. She broke in half the next day, and her stern section sank without loss of life. The bow section and cargo were salvaged, and the bow section was recovered and transferred to the Maritime Administration 23 July 1953 for disposition.

== Military awards and honors ==
Grommet Reefer’s crew was eligible for the following medal:

- National Defense Service Medal
