= Midway Station =

Midway Station may refer to:

- Midway station (Minnesota), a former Amtrak train station in Saint Paul, Minnesota
- Midway station (CTA), a metro station serving Midway Airport in Chicago, Illinois

== See also ==
- Midway (disambiguation)
