= Midway, Rapides Parish, Louisiana =

Midway, Louisiana
- Unincorporated community
- Location within Louisiana Location within the United States
- Coordinates: 31°03′41″N 92°28′21″W
- Country: United States
- State: Louisiana
- Parish: Rapides
- Elevation: 161 ft (49 m)
- Time zone: UTC-6 (Central (CST))
  - Summer (DST): UTC-5 (CDT)
- Area code: 318
- GNIS feature ID: 537067

Midway is an unincorporated community in Rapides Parish, Louisiana, United States. Midway is located on Louisiana Highway 112, 3.7 miles (6.0 km) east-northeast of Forest Hill.

== Notable residents ==
Louisiana singer Jay Chevalier was reared in Midway in the late 1930s and 1940s.
