= Battle of Midway (disambiguation) =

The Battle of Midway, 4–7 June 1942, was a major naval battle in the Pacific Theater of World War II.

The Battle of Midway may also refer to:

== Film ==
- The Battle of Midway (film), a 1942 documentary about the battle
- Midway (1976 film), also known as Battle of Midway and The Battle of Midway, a 1976 film about the battle
- Midway (2019 film), a 2019 film about the battle

== Other uses ==
- Battle for Midway (video game), a 1984 strategy video game about the battle
- 1943: The Battle of Midway, a 1987 shoot 'em up arcade game based on the actual battle
- Battle of Midway (horse) (2014–2019), Thoroughbred racehorse

== See also ==
- Midway (disambiguation)
- Battle of the Medway
