= Jay Chevalier =

American singer-songwriter (1936–2019)

- Born: Joe J. Chevalier; March 4, 1936; Forest Hill, Louisiana, U.S.
- Died: March 30, 2019 (aged 83); Kenner, Louisiana, U.S.
- Resting place: Butters Cemetery, Forest Hill, Louisiana
- Occupations: Musician, songwriter
- Spouse(s): Gloria Don Ambrose Chevalier, Marjanne Taylor Chevalier, Shelley Ford Chevalier, Gisela Marina "Giselle" Chevalier
- Children: Jan Dawn Chevalier/Gallo, Jay Earl Chevalier, Cid Zane Chevalier

Notes
- "Louisiana's Official State Troubadour"

Joe J. Chevalier, known as Jay Chevalier (March 4, 1936 – March 30, 2019), was an American singer and songwriter from Louisiana who achieved success in several musical genres since the late 1950s. A pioneer of rockabilly music, he is best known within Louisiana for his songs based on politics, sports, and his love for his home state. The first "Official State Troubadour," he is an inductee to the Rockabilly Hall of Fame, the Louisiana Music Hall of Fame, Songwriters Hall of Fame, and the Louisiana Political Museum and Hall of Fame

== Biography ==
=== Background ===
Chevalier was born in Forest Hill near Lecompte and reared in the community of Midway in Rapides Parish just south of Alexandria, Louisiana. He claims to have grown up "poor and naked in the piney wood hills along the banks of Bayou Boeuf." In 1954, Chevalier enlisted in the United States Marine Corps where he formed his first band, which appeared in 1957 on Jimmy Dean's national day-time television program on CBS. Upon his discharge from the military, Chevalier recorded his first record, "Rockin [!!] Roll Angel". Gene Vincent had just recorded "Be-Bop-A-Lula", and the two became good friends and worked together in Norfolk, Virginia. Vincent died in 1971 at the age of thirty-six.

=== The Ballad of Earl K. Long and Billy Cannon ===
In 1959, three-time Louisiana Governor Earl Kemp Long, who was barred by the state constitution from succeeding himself, ran for lieutenant governor on an intra-party ticket headed by another former governor, James A. Noe of Monroe, the owner of KNOE-TV. Intrigued by the flamboyant character, Chevalier composed and recorded The Ballad of Earl K. Long which was initially banned from radio play because it was suspected to be a political ploy though Chevalier had not personally met Long. Within a short time the song found its way onto the airways and was enthusiastically received. It sold more than 100,000 copies in the state.

That same year, Chevalier released Billy Cannon, a rollicking tribute to LSU's only Heisman Trophy winner, Billy Cannon, who led the LSU Tigers to win the 1958 national championship. On Halloween Night, 1959, Cannon electrified a partisan LSU crowd and stunned the Ole Miss Rebels with a fourth-quarter, 89-yard punt return to give the Tigers a 7–3 victory.

Chevalier attended the game with Governor Long and while he was not really a football fan, he witnessed the pandemonium of the Tiger Stadium crowd after the touchdown and wrote the song that night. A record was released within days, adding to Cannon's already mythical reputation. Chevalier himself became a household word from Shreveport to New Orleans.

== Other career highlights ==
By 1962, he began performing an extended engagement at the Golden Nugget in Las Vegas, Nevada. The next year he added a 19-year-old from Baton Rouge, Grace Broussard, to his show that already included Dale Houston. Dale & Grace had just recorded an old Don and Dewey Squires song, "I'm Leaving It Up to You". While Dale, Grace, and Chevalier were on tour, the song reached No. 1 nationally and sold two million copies.

In 1963, a homesick Chevalier recorded another regional hit, "Come Back to Louisiana". The song was revived when it was featured in the 1989 movie Blaze, in which Paul Newman played Earl Long. Chevalier was a consultant for the movie and played the role of Senator Paul Braden. "Come Back to Louisiana" was re-recorded in 2006 to encourage victims of Hurricane Katrina to return home to rebuild. The Louisiana State Legislature adopted "Come Back to Louisiana" as the third state song. The two others are "You Are My Sunshine" by former Governor Jimmie Davis and "Give Me Louisiana". Chevalier's office was flooded, and his home suffered tree damage during Hurricane Katrina. He re-introduced "Come Back to Louisiana" and sang it A cappella to the legislature.

== Political campaigns ==
By 1967, Chevalier had returned to his native Alexandria and was operating a large nightclub on upper 3rd Street named "The Branding Iron". In 1968 he closed the nightclub and announced his intentions to run for mayor of Alexandria, a campaign that was later won by John Snyder. In 1968, Chevalier and his close friend Dub Guimbellot open a large night club in Forest Hill, Louisiana named Lake Shamarie. At that time the club was considered the largest nightclub in Louisiana, seating almost 500 party goers each weekend. That venture closed in January 1970 when Guimbellot, who had served in the US Army for several years reentered the Army and completed his career where he retired in 1984 as a First Sergeant. Chevalier managed a number of political campaigns and operated a travel company named Super Country USA. In 1987 Chevalier entered politics himself with a campaign for Mayor of Alexandria, Louisiana. He lost that election to John Snyder.

== Honors ==
Chevalier is a member of the Rockabilly Hall of Fame. He was inducted into the Louisiana Political Museum and Hall of Fame in January 2003, and on December 7, 2008, he was named to the Louisiana Music Hall of Fame. He was also designated ""Official State Troubadour" by an act of the Louisiana Legislature in 2006.
