= Medway SLA100 Executive =

British ultralight aircraft

SLA100 Executive
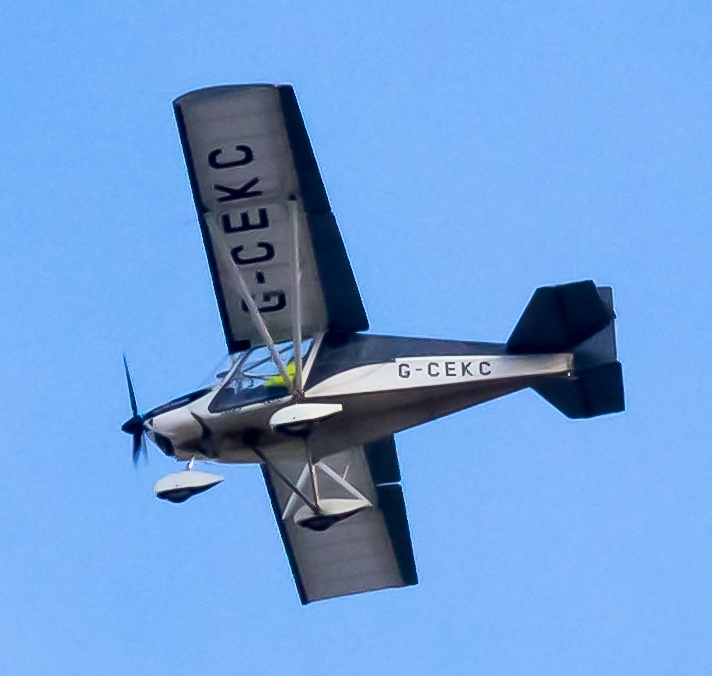
- Medway SLA100 Executive

General information
- Type: Ultralight aircraft
- National origin: United Kingdom
- Manufacturer: Medway Microlights
- Status: In production (2012)

The Medway SLA100 Executive, also called the Medway SLA 100 Executive, is a British ultralight aircraft designed and produced by Medway Microlights, of Rochester, Kent. The aircraft is supplied as a kit for amateur construction or as a complete ready-to-fly-aircraft.

== Design and development ==
The aircraft was designed to comply with the British BCAR Section "S" and the Fédération Aéronautique Internationale microlight rules. It features a strut-braced high-wing, a two-seats-in-side-by-side configuration enclosed cockpit, fixed tricycle landing gear and a single engine in tractor configuration.

The SLA100 is made from bolted-together aluminium tubing, with its flying surfaces covered in Dacron sailcloth. Its 9.7 m (31.8 ft) span wing has an area of 13.8 m^{2} (149 sq ft) and is supported by V-struts with jury struts. Standard engines available are the 80 hp (60 kW) Rotax 912UL and the 100 hp (75 kW) Rotax 912ULS four-stroke powerplants.

The SA100 has been certified to the UK BCAR Section "S" standard.

== Variants ==
SLA100 Executive
Standard model with a 9.7 m (31.8 ft) wing span
SLA100 Clipper
Clipped wing model, introduced in 2010 and still under development in 2015.

== Specifications (SLA100 Executive) ==
Data from Bayerl and Tacke

General characteristics

- Crew: one
- Capacity: one passenger
- Wingspan: 9.7 m (31 ft 10 in)
- Wing area: 13.8 m^{2} (149 sq ft)
- Empty weight: 262 kg (578 lb)
- Gross weight: 450 kg (992 lb)
- Fuel capacity: 100 litres (22 imp gal; 26 US gal)
- Powerplant: 1 × Rotax 912UL four cylinder, liquid and air-cooled, four stroke aircraft engine, 60 kW (80 hp)
- Propellers: 2-bladed composite

Performance

- Maximum speed: 153 km/h (95 mph, 83 kn)
- Cruise speed: 129 km/h (80 mph, 70 kn)
- Stall speed: 60 km/h (37 mph, 32 kn)
- Rate of climb: 4.3 m/s (850 ft/min)
- Wing loading: 32.6 kg/m^{2} (6.7 lb/sq ft)
