= Midway Township, Minnesota =

Midway Township is the name of some places in the U.S. state of Minnesota:

- Midway Township, Cottonwood County, Minnesota
- Midway Township, St. Louis County, Minnesota

See also: Midway Township (disambiguation)
