= Medway EclipseR =

British ultralight trike

EclipseR

General information
- Type: Ultralight trike
- National origin: United Kingdom
- Manufacturer: Medway Microlights
- Status: In production (2013)

The Medway EclipseR is a British ultralight trike designed and produced by Medway Microlights. The aircraft is supplied fully factory-built.

== Design and development ==
The aircraft was designed as a touring trike, to comply with the Fédération Aéronautique Internationale microlight category, including the category's maximum gross weight of 450 kg (992 lb). The aircraft has a maximum gross weight of 415 kg (915 lb). The EclipseR is certified to the British BCAR Section "S" standard. It features a cable-braced hang glider-style high-wing, weight-shift controls, a two-seats-in-tandem open cockpit, tricycle landing gear and a single engine in pusher configuration.

The aircraft is made from tubing, with its double-surface Raven wing covered in Dacron sailcloth. Its 11.0 m (36.1 ft) span wing is supported by a single tube-type kingpost and uses an "A" frame control bar. The carriage features a cockpit fairing with a windshield and wheel spats. Hydraulic brakes are standard equipment. The standard engine is the four-cylinder, four-stroke 60 kW (80 hp) Rotax 912UL.

== Specifications (EclipseR) ==
Data from Bertrand, Bayerl and Medway

General characteristics

- Crew: one
- Capacity: one passenger
- Wingspan: 11.0 m (36 ft 1 in)
- Wing area: 15.0 m^{2} (161 sq ft)
- Aspect ratio: 8:1
- Empty weight: 208 kg (459 lb)
- Gross weight: 415 kg (915 lb)
- Fuel capacity: 42 litres (9.2 imp gal; 11 US gal)
- Powerplant: 1 × Rotax 912UL four-stroke, four-cylinder aircraft engine, 60 kW (80 hp)

Performance

- Maximum speed: 129 km/h (80 mph, 70 kn)
- Cruise speed: 100 km/h (62 mph, 54 kn)
- Stall speed: 48 km/h (30 mph, 26 kn)
- Rate of climb: 4.1 m/s (810 ft/min)
- Wing loading: 27.7 kg/m^{2} (5.7 lb/sq ft)
