= USNS Perseus =

Cargo ship of the United States Navy

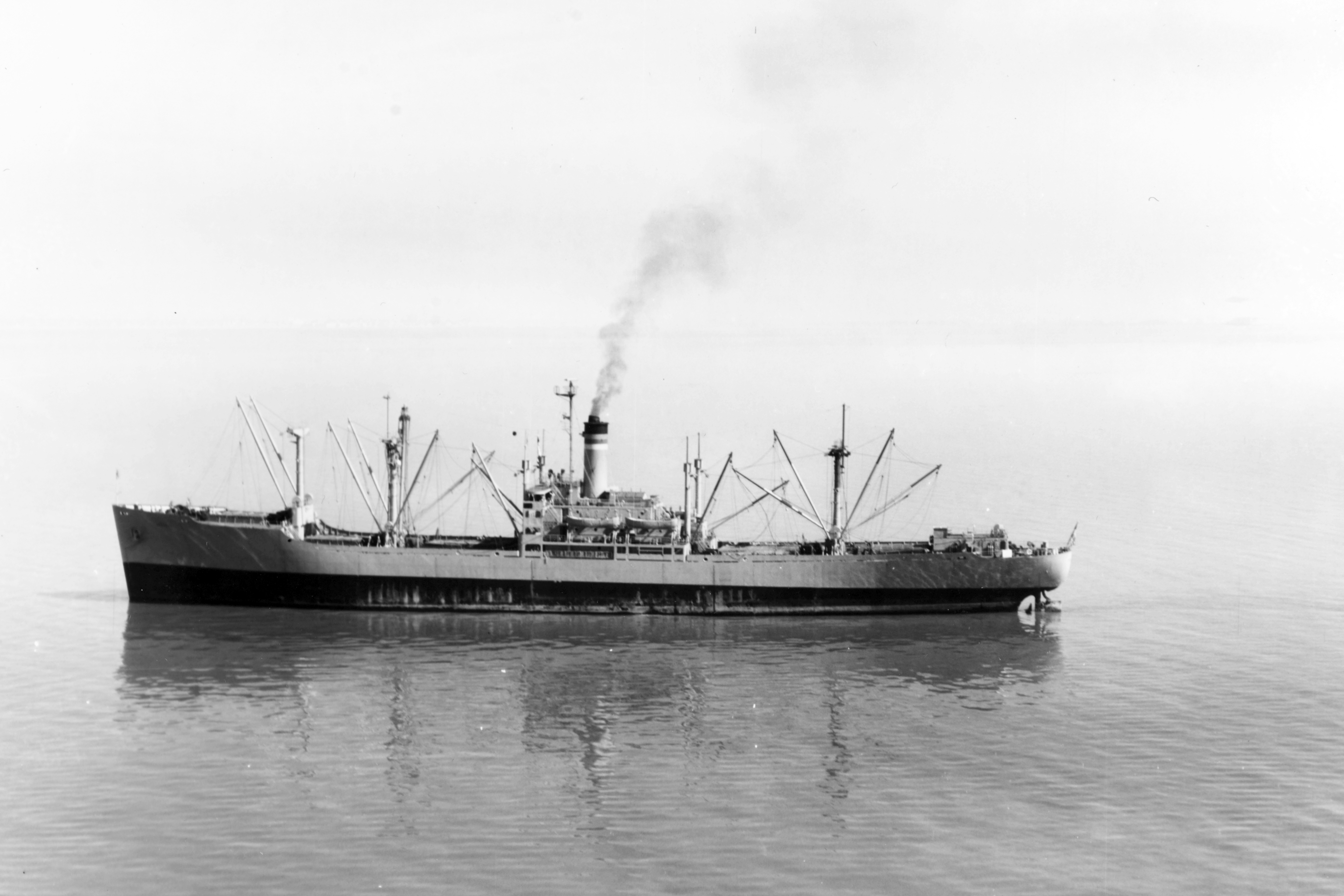
- USNS Perseus in March 1963

History

United States
- Name: SS Union Victory
- Namesake: Union College
- Owner: War Shipping Administration
- Operator: Alaska Transportation Company
- Ordered: as SS Union Victory; VC-2-S-AP3 hull, MCV hull 683
- Builder: Oregon Shipbuilding Corp., Portland, OR.
- Laid down: 30 March 1945
- Launched: 11 May 1945
- Completed: 8 June 1945
- Out of service: 14 October 1952
- Fate: Transferred to US Navy 7 November 1961

History

United States
- Name: USNS Perseus (T-AF-64)
- Owner: US Navy
- Operator: US Navy
- Ordered: VC-2-S-AP3 hull, MCV hull 683
- In service: September 1962
- Reclassified: Cargo, stores, refrigerated items
- Refit: Provisions Store Ship at Willamette Iron and Steel Co., Portland, OR.
- Stricken: 15 June 1973
- Fate: Scrapped at Kaohsiung in 1974

General characteristics
- Displacement: 4,960 tons(lt), 11,900 tons (fl)
- Length: 455 ft 3 in (138.76 m)
- Beam: 62 ft (19 m)
- Draught: 28 ft 6 in (8.69 m)
- Propulsion: geared steam turbine, single propeller, 8,500shp
- Speed: 16.5 kts.
- Complement: 56
- Armament: 1 × 5 inch (127 mm)/38 caliber gun as Victory Ship; 1 × 3 inch (76 mm)/50 caliber gun As; 8 × 20 mm Oerlikon; none as USNS Perseus

USNS Perseus (T-AF-64) was a Denebola-class stores ship acquired by the U.S. Navy. Her task was to carry stores, refrigerated items, and equipment to ships in the fleet, and to remote stations and staging areas.

Perseus was laid down as SS Union Victory a Victory ship, (MCV hull 683) by the Oregon Shipbuilding Corp., Portland, Oregon, 30 March 1945; launched 11 May 1945; sponsored by Mrs. Claude F. Palmer; and delivered to the Maritime Commission, 8 June 1945. For cargo transport during World War II.

== SS Union Victory operations under contract ==
Operated on contract from the Maritime Commission, SS Union Victory carried military cargoes during the last months of World War II in the Pacific Ocean; the initial year of the European Occupation; and, four years later, the Korean War. After Korea she returned to commercial transport, then entered the Maritime Administration’s National Defense Reserve Fleet. Union Victory was delivered to the Maritime Commission, 8 June 1945 transferred under a General Agency Agreement to Alaska Transportation Company On 28 June 1946 transferred for operation to Black Diamond Steamship Company. Operation transferred to the South Atlantic SS Company on 21 October 1948. She was laid up in the National Defense Reserve Fleet in Beaumont Texas on 12 November 1948. On 27 July 1950 she was put back into service and transferred to the Mississippi Shipping Company. Transferred operation to American Mail Line on 19 April 1952. She was laid up again into the National Defense Reserve Fleet at Olympia, WA. on 26 May 1952. She was put back in service and transferred back to the American Mail Line Ltd. on 25 September 1952. On 14 October 1952 she again was laid up in the National Defense Reserve Fleet at Olympia, WA. On SS 7 November 1961 the SS Union Victory ownership was transferred to the US Navy.

SS Union Victory served as merchant marine naval ship supplying goods for the Korean War. About 75 percent of the personnel going to Korea for the Korean War came by the merchant marine. SS Union Victory transported goods, mail, food and other supplies. About 90 percent of the cargo was moved by merchant marine naval ships to the war zone. Union Victory made trip between 18 November 1950 and 23 December 1952 helping American forces engaged against Communist aggression in South Korea.

== Operations under the MSTS ==
In late 1961 she was transferred to MSTS for conversion to a refrigeration ship. Renamed and designated Perseus (AF–64), 4 December 1961, she was converted by the Willamette Iron and Steel Co., Portland, Oregon, and in September 1962 was placed in service as USNS Perseus (T-AF-64) and was crewed by the Civil Service. Since that time, into 1970, she has operated under ComMSTSPac and has carried fresh and frozen foods from the U.S. West Coast to Pacific and Far East ports.

== End-of-service ==
Perseus was placed out of service (date unknown) and struck from the Naval Register, 15 June 1973. She was returned to MARAD for lay up in the National Defense Reserve Fleet. It was sold on 31 August 1973, and scrapped at Kaohsiung in 1974.

== Military awards and honors ==
Perseus’ crew was eligible for the following medals:

- National Defense Service Medal

== See also ==
- List of United States Navy ships
- Cargo ship
- Liberty ship = Previous cargo ship.
- List of Victory ships
- Type C1 ship
- Type C2 ship
- Type C3 ship
