= Midway, Minnesota =

Midway, Minnesota may refer to the following places in the U.S. state of Minnesota:

- Midway, Becker County, Minnesota, an unincorporated community
- Midway, Mahnomen County, Minnesota, a census-designated place

== See also ==
- Midway Township, Minnesota (disambiguation)
