= Midway, Tennessee =

Midway, Tennessee may refer to the following places in the U.S. state of Tennessee:

- Midway, Bedford County, Tennessee, an unincorporated community
- Midway, Cannon County, Tennessee, an unincorporated community
- Midway, Clay County, Tennessee, an unincorporated community
- Midway, Cocke County, Tennessee, an unincorporated community
- Midway, Crockett County, Tennessee, an unincorporated community
- Midway, Cumberland County, Tennessee, an unincorporated community
- Midway, DeKalb County, Tennessee, an unincorporated community
- Midway, Dyer County, Tennessee, an unincorporated community
- Midway, Franklin County, Tennessee, an unincorporated community
- Midway, Greene County, Tennessee, an unincorporated community
- Midway, Hawkins County, Tennessee, an unincorporated community
- Midway (north), Henry County, Tennessee, an unincorporated community
- Midway (south), Henry County, Tennessee, an unincorporated community
- Midway, Johnson County, Tennessee, an unincorporated community
- Midway, Knox County, Tennessee, an unincorporated community
- Midway, Morgan County, Tennessee, an unincorporated community
- Midway, Obion County, Tennessee, an unincorporated community
- Midway, Pickett County, Tennessee, an unincorporated community
- Midway, Roane County, Tennessee, an unincorporated community
- Midway, Warren County, Tennessee, an unincorporated community
- Midway, Washington County, Tennessee, an unincorporated community
