= Middle way (disambiguation) =

Middle Way is the term that Siddhartha Gautama (Buddha) used to describe the character of the path he discovered that leads to liberation.

Middle way or Middleway may also refer to:

- Golden mean (philosophy), the desirable middle between two extremes, one of excess and the other of deficiency
- Doctrine of the Mean, a doctrine of Confucianism
- Middle Way Approach, a balanced approach to Tibet existing with religious freedom inside Communist China as proposed by the 14th Dalai Lama
- The Middle Way (journal), a quarterly journal of the Buddhist Society
- The Middle Way (book), 1938 book on political philosophy by Harold Macmillan
- Middleway, West Virginia, a populated place
- The Middleway, A4540 ring road in Birmingham, England

== See also ==
- Midway (disambiguation)
- Sweden: The Middle Way, 1936 book by Marquis Childs
- Via media ("middle road" in Latin), which is frequently associated, among other things, with Anglicanism
