= Midway Dragway =

Coordinates: 33.5758°N 79.9342°W

Midway Dragway is an eighth mile drag racing facility located in Greeleyville, South Carolina. It is sanctioned by the International Hotrod Association.

In 2007, the track underwent a change of ownership and was renamed Midway Dragway from Midway Dragstrip.

Built in 2001, the dragstrip was named for its location, approximately midway between Charleston, SC, and Florence, SC.
