= Forest Hill, Louisiana =

- Village
- Village of Forest Hill
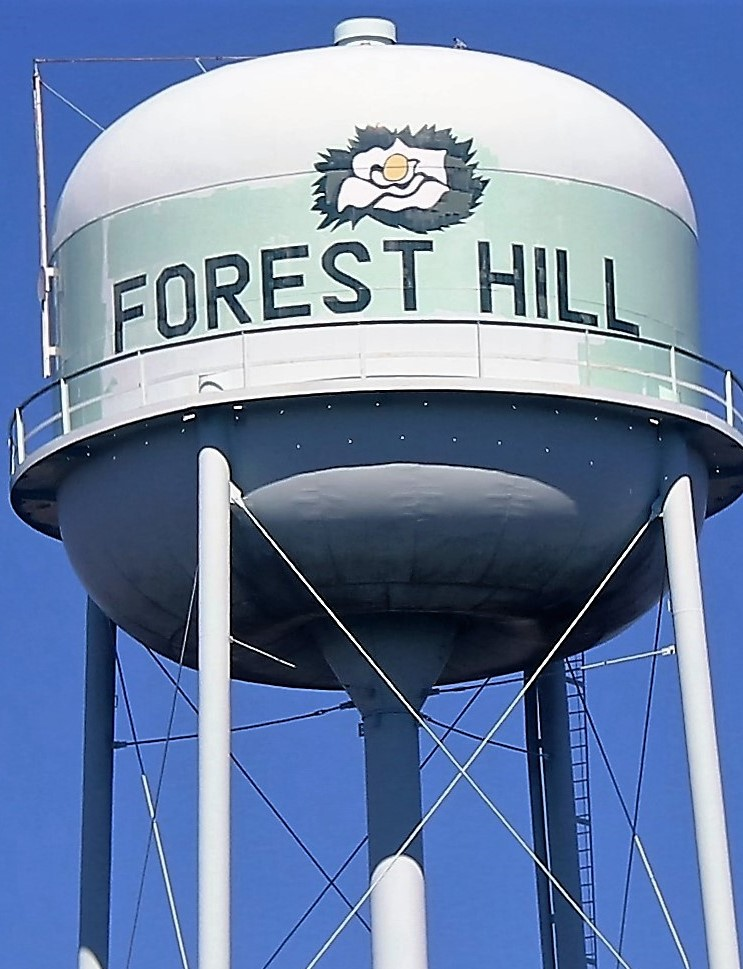

- Location of Forest Hill in Rapides Parish, Louisiana.

- Location of Louisiana in the United States
- Coordinates: 31°03′15″N 92°30′33″W
- Country: United States
- State: Louisiana
- Parish: Rapides

Area
  - Total: 3.79 sq mi (9.82 km^{2})
  - Land: 3.76 sq mi (9.73 km^{2})
  - Water: 0.035 sq mi (0.09 km^{2})
- Elevation: 148 ft (45 m)

Population (2020)
  - Total: 605
  - Density: 161.0/sq mi (62.16/km^{2})
- Time zone: UTC-6 (CST)
  - Summer (DST): UTC-5 (CDT)
- Area code: 318
- FIPS code: 22-26420
- GNIS feature ID: 2407458
- Website: foresthill-la.com

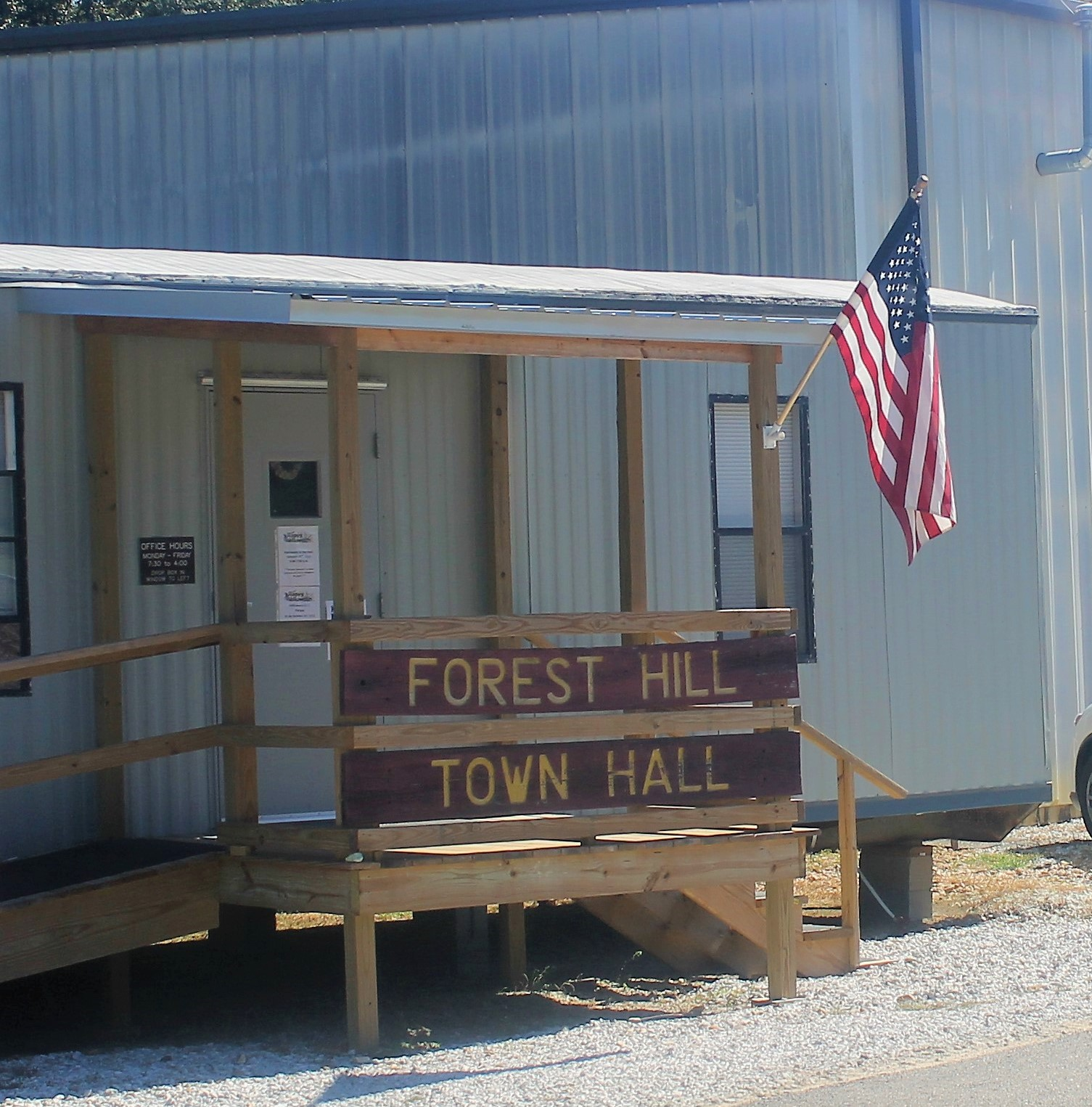
Forest Hill Town Hall

Forest Hill is a village in Rapides Parish, Louisiana, United States. It is part of the Alexandria, Louisiana Metropolitan Statistical Area. The population was placed at 605 according to the 2020 census.

== Geography ==
According to the United States Census Bureau, the village has a total area of 3.2 square miles (8.3 km^{2}), of which 3.2 square miles (8.3 km^{2}) is land and 0.1 square miles (0.26 km^{2}) (1.56%) is water.

== Demographics ==
Historical population
Census	Pop.	Note	%±
1930	304		—
1940	302		−0.7%
1950	365		20.9%
1960	302		−17.3%
1970	370		22.5%
1980	494		33.5%
1990	408		−17.4%
2000	456		11.8%
2010	818		79.4%
2020	605		−26.0%
2025 (est.)	614	▲	1.5%
U.S. Decennial Census

=== Racial and ethnic composition ===
Forest Hill village, Louisiana – Racial and ethnic composition Note: the US Census treats Hispanic/Latino as an ethnic category. This table excludes Latinos from the racial categories and assigns them to a separate category. Hispanics/Latinos may be of any race.
Race / Ethnicity (NH = Non-Hispanic)	Pop 2000	Pop 2010	Pop 2020	% 2000	% 2010	% 2020
White alone (NH)	362	425	346	79.39%	51.96%	57.19%
Black or African American alone (NH)	28	29	12	6.14%	3.55%	1.98%
Native American or Alaska Native alone (NH)	2	1	1	0.44%	0.12%	0.17%
Asian alone (NH)	5	3	9	1.10%	0.37%	1.49%
Native Hawaiian or Pacific Islander alone (NH)	0	0	0	0.00%	0.00%	0.00%
Other race alone (NH)	0	0	0	0.00%	0.00%	0.00%
Mixed race or Multiracial (NH)	3	9	5	0.66%	1.10%	0.83%
Hispanic or Latino (any race)	56	351	232	12.28%	42.91%	38.35%
Total	456	818	605	100.00%	100.00%	100.00%

Forest Hill has seen its Latino population surge to over 38% of the population since 2000.

=== 2020 census ===
As of the 2020 United States census, there were 605 people, 315 households, and 214 families residing in the village.

=== 2010 census ===
As of the census of 2010, there were 813 people, 367 households, and 245 families residing in the village. The population density was 258 inhabitants per square mile (100/km^{2}). There were 282 housing units at an average density of 82.4 per square mile (31.8/km^{2}). The racial makeup of the village was 52.0% White, 3.52% African American, 0.44% Native American, 1.40% Asian, 6.36% from other races, and 1.68% from two or more races. Hispanic or Latino of any race were 42.98% of the population.

There were 167 households, out of which 35.3% had children under the age of 18 living with them, 65.3% were married couples living together, 7.2% had a female householder with no husband present, and 24.6% were non-families. 18.6% of all households were made up of individuals, and 7.8% had someone living alone who was 65 years of age or older. The average household size was 2.73 and the average family size was 3.13.

In the village, the population was spread out, with 24.8% under the age of 18, 10.5% from 18 to 24, 27.2% from 25 to 44, 24.6% from 45 to 64, and 12.9% who were 65 years of age or older. The median age was 34 years. For every 100 females, there were 97.4 males. For every 100 females age 18 and over, there were 101.8 males.

The median income for a household in the village was $36,667, and the median income for a family was $42,292. Males had a median income of $27,500 versus $16,875 for females. The per capita income for the village was $13,859. About 18.0% of families and 25.5% of the population were below the poverty line, including 18.5% of those under age 18 and 14.0% of those age 65 or over.

== Arts and culture ==
Every year, during the third weekend of March, Forest Hill is home to the Louisiana Nursery Festival.

Forest Hill is home to over 60 plant nurseries, and is one of Louisiana's oldest and largest nursery regions. Businesses routinely visit Forest Hill to purchase wholesale plants.

== Cajun Classic National Enduro ==
The Cajun Classic National Enduro is an enduro race that is held in the Calcasieu District in Kisatchie National Forest. The 29th Annual was held March 20, 2011. It was organized and run by the National Enduro Promotions Group and Acadiana Dirt Riders, Inc.

== Speed trap and citations ==
The Village of Forest Hill is one of many municipalities that derives a majority of its revenue from fines and citations. Most of those citations are from the town being part of a speed trap.

== Notable people ==
- Jay Chevalier, singer and politician, born in Forest Hill in 1936
- Clyde C. Holloway, Republican former U.S. representative
- Kimberly Willis Holt, children's author
