= Midway, Fayette County, West Virginia =

- Unincorporated community
- Location within West Virginia Location within the United States
- Coordinates: 38°00′10″N 81°08′53″W
- Country: United States
- State: West Virginia
- County: Fayette
- Elevation: 1,913 ft (583 m)
- Time zone: UTC-5 (Eastern (EST))
  - Summer (DST): UTC-4 (EDT)
- Area codes: 304 & 681
- GNIS feature ID: 1555117

Midway is an unincorporated community in Fayette County, West Virginia, United States. Midway is located near the northern border of Oak Hill.
