= Midway, Kansas =

Midway, Kansas may refer to:

- Midway, Crawford County, Kansas, an unincorporated community
- Midway, Kingman County, Kansas, an unincorporated community
- Midway, Rawlins County, Kansas, an unincorporated community
