= Midway, Oregon =

Midway, Oregon may refer to the following places in the U.S. state of Oregon:

- Four Corners, Jackson County, Oregon, formerly known as Midway
- Midway, Umatilla County, Oregon, on Oregon Route 335
- Midway, Washington County, Oregon, a populated place
- Midway, Yamhill County, Oregon, Yamhill County, Oregon
