= Midway, Indiana =

Midway may refer to the following places in the U.S. state of Indiana:

- Midway, Clinton County, Indiana, a town in Perry Township; renamed Colfax in 1857
- Midway, Spencer County, Indiana, an unincorporated community in Grass Township
