= Medway (1902) =

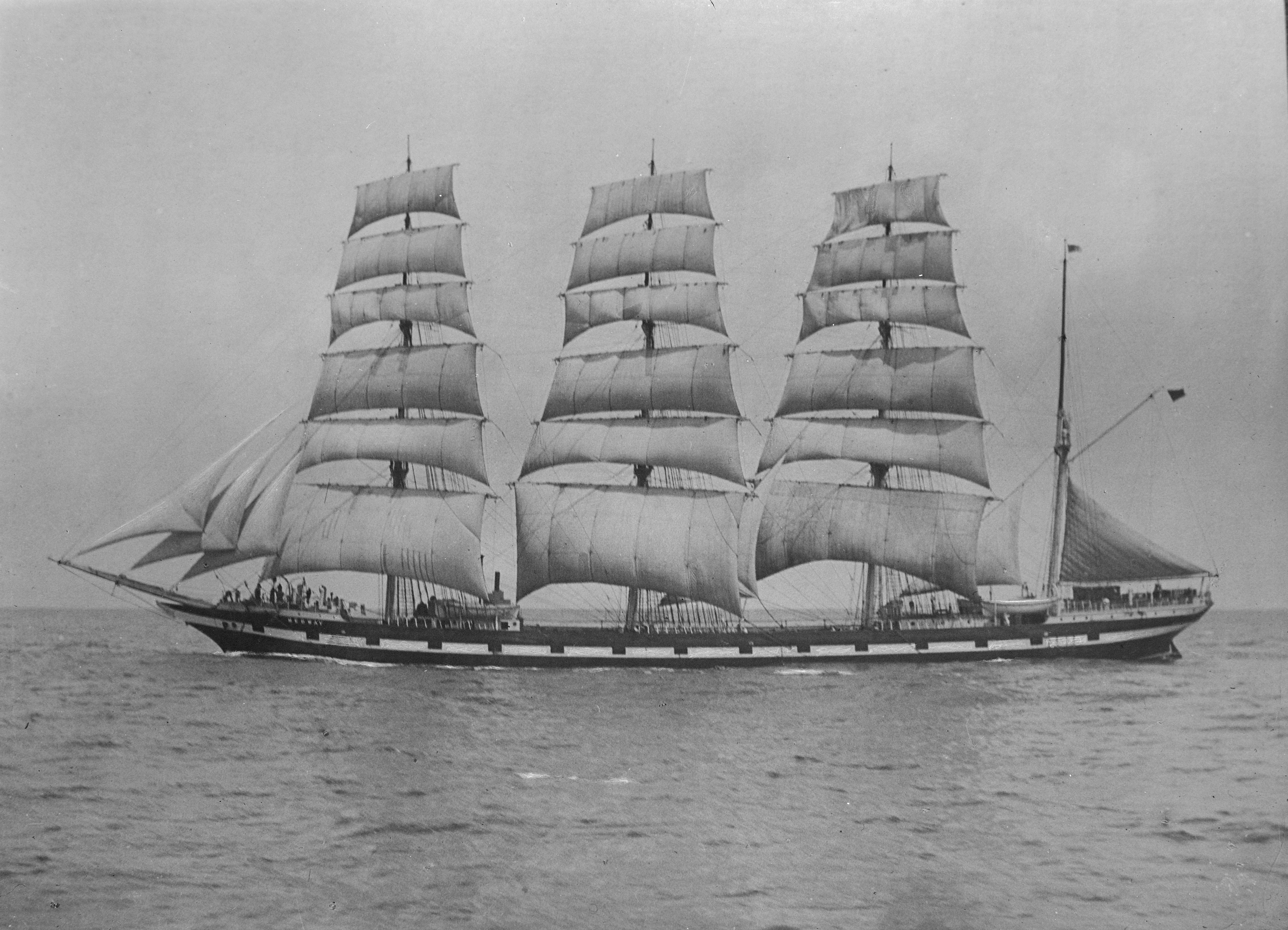
- Medway

History
- Name: Medway (1864–1922)
- Owner: Messrs Sota & Aznar of Bilbao (1902–1910); Devitt and Moore (1910–1918); Anglo-Saxon Petroleum Co Ltd (1918–?)
- Builder: A. McMillan & Son, Dumbarton
- Launched: 26 May 1902
- Commissioned: 1902
- Fate: Broken up 1933

General characteristics
- Tonnage: 2,516 GRT
- Length: 300 ft 0 in (91.44 m)
- Beam: 43 ft 2 in (13.16 m)
- Draught: 22 ft 2 in (6.76 m)
- Sail plan: 4-masted Barque

The Medway was a four-masted barque built in 1902 by A. McMillan & Son, Dumbarton, Scotland. It was originally named the Ama Begonakoa when built for Messrs Sota and Aznar of Bilbao but was registered in Montevideo and first flew the Uruguayan flag.

The ship's figure-head was the Madonna and Child.

Devitt and Moore purchased the ship in June 1910 for £30,000 as a sail training ship for their company Devitt & Moore's Ocean Training Ships Limited. Devitt and Moore also used the ship in the Australian wool and wheat trade, and South American nitrate trade.

During one voyage, in December 1916, the Medway passed east to west around Cape Horn, which is possibly the last occasion that a square-rig sailing ship passed in that direction. Passing east to west around Cape Horn could take some square-riggers six weeks to beat around.

During 1918, the exigencies of the Great War necessitated the sale of Devitt and Moore's, then, only training ship, and it was sold to the Anglo-Saxon Petroleum Company (later Royal Dutch Shell ) for £41,000. The ship was then converted into a bulk oil carrier and renamed the Myr Shell and used for service in the Far East. Subsequently the Myr Shell became an oil depot ship in Singapore before being sold to Japanese shipbreakers for £1,500 in 1933.

== Gallery ==
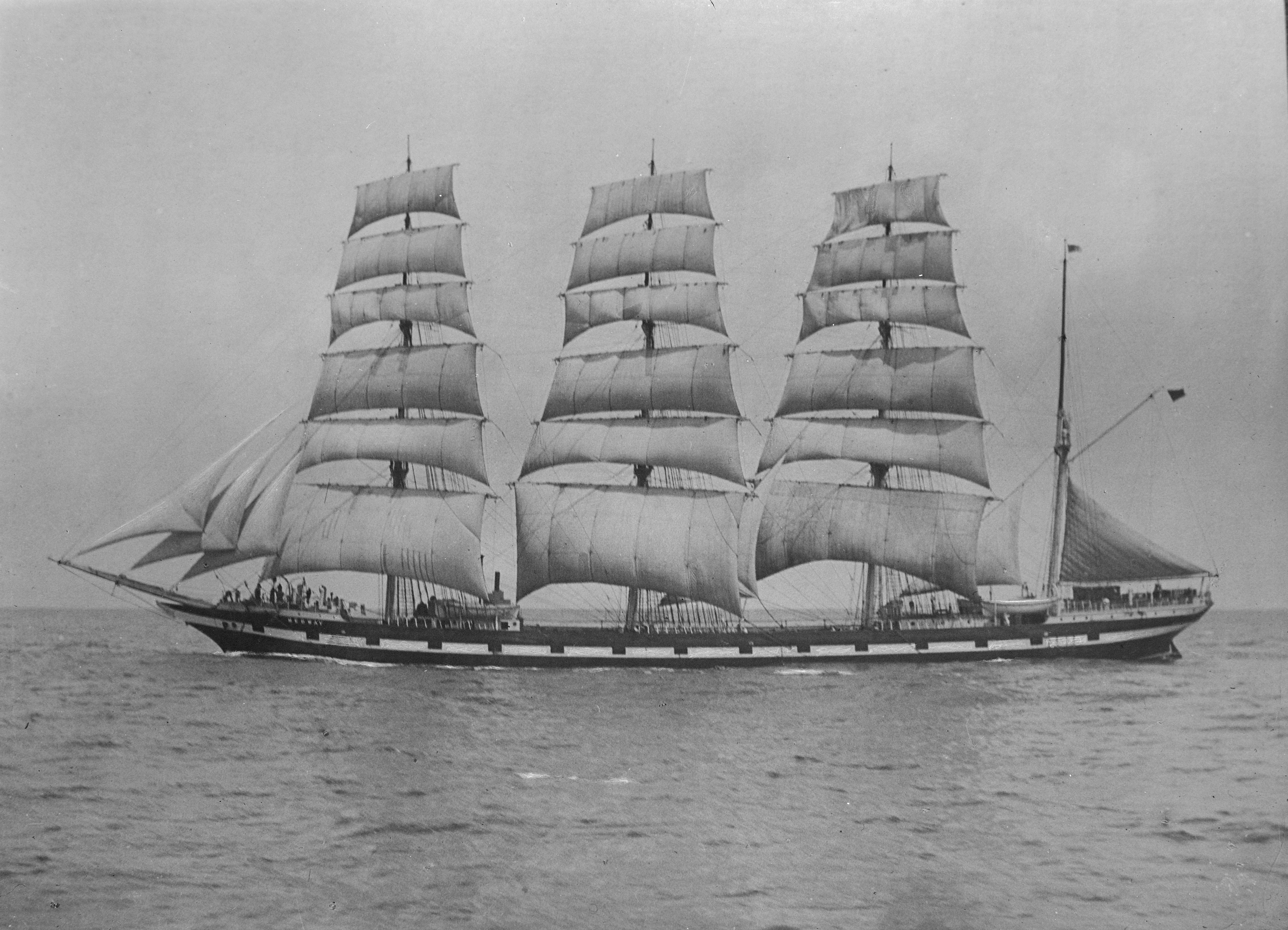

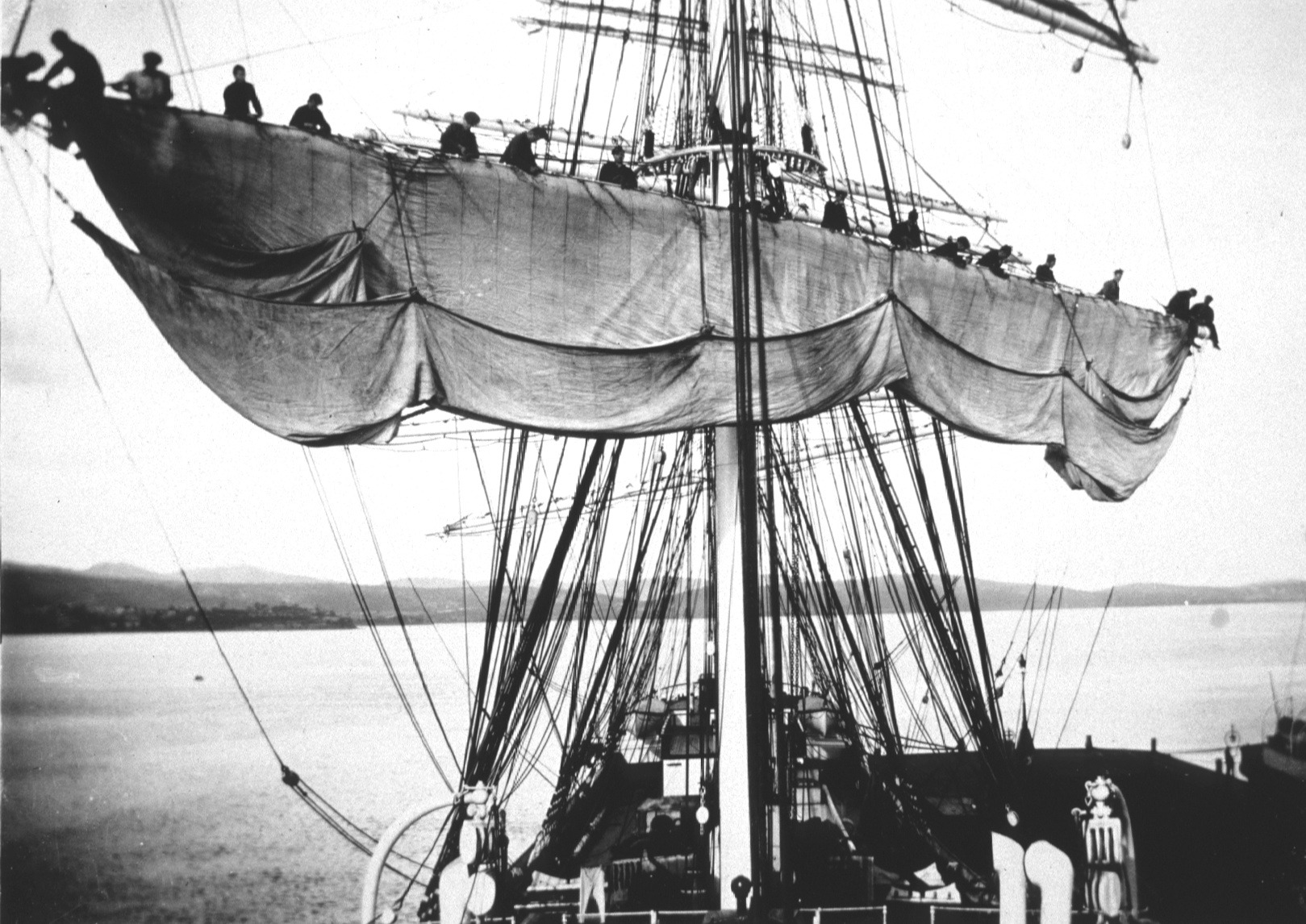

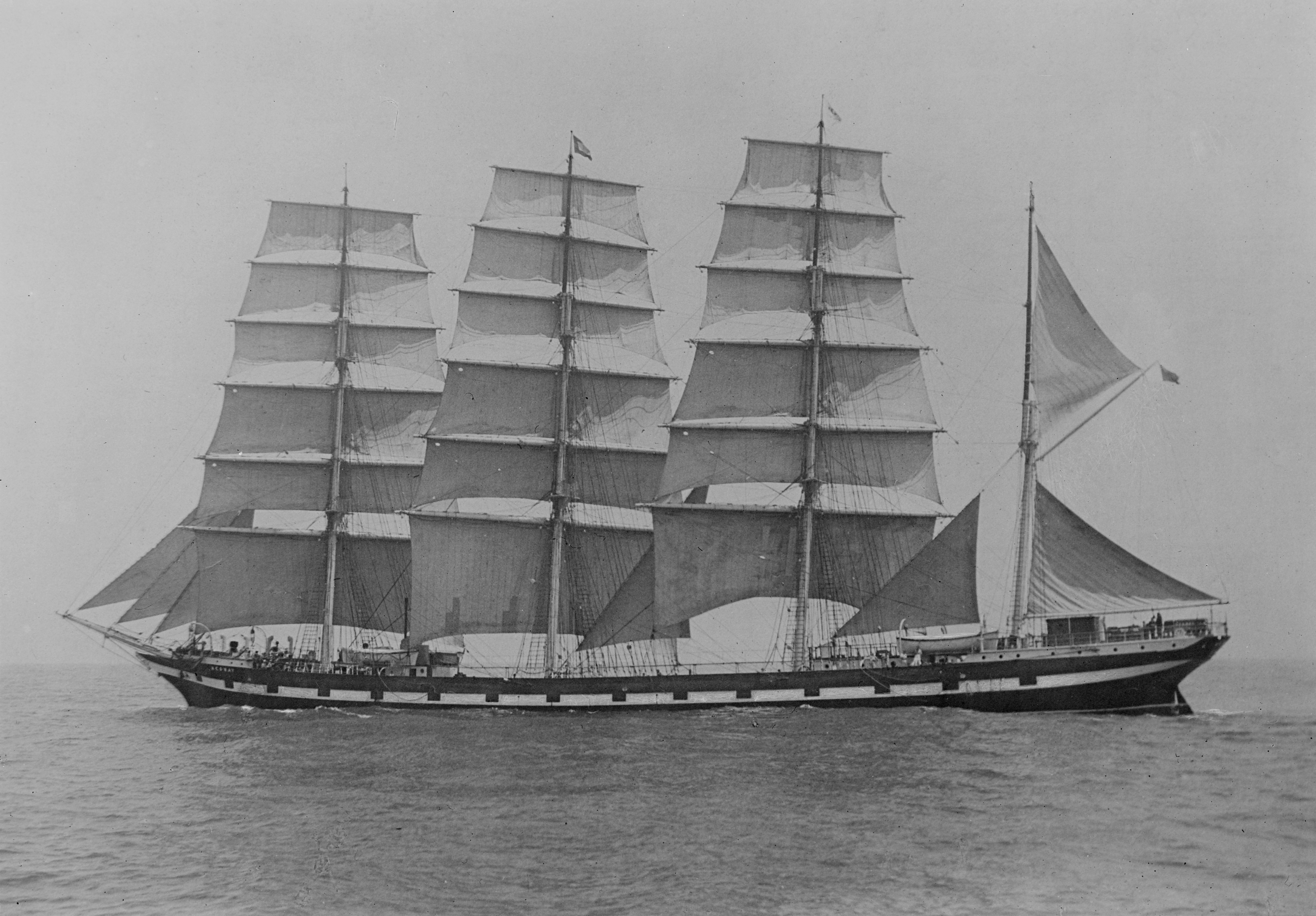

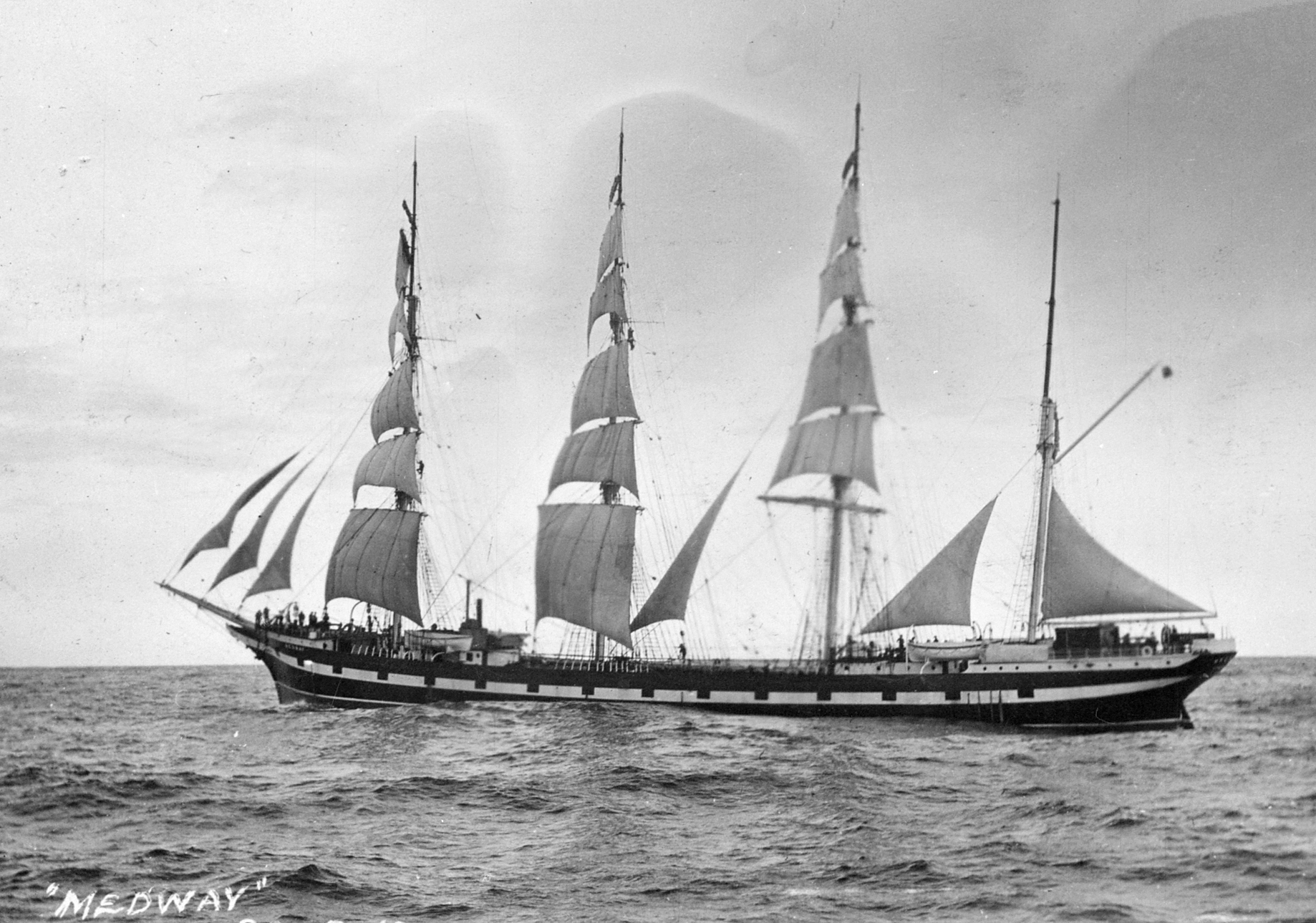

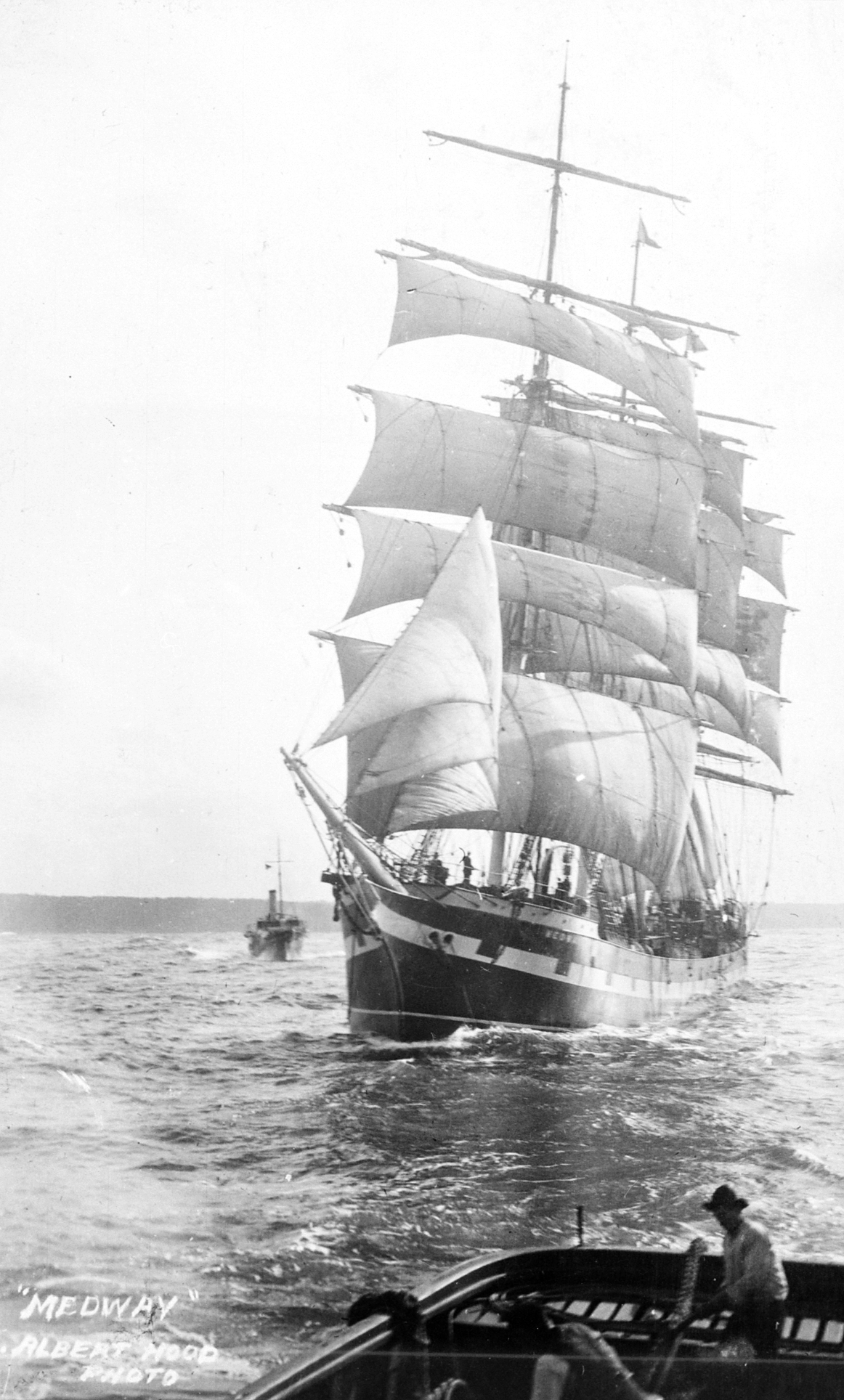

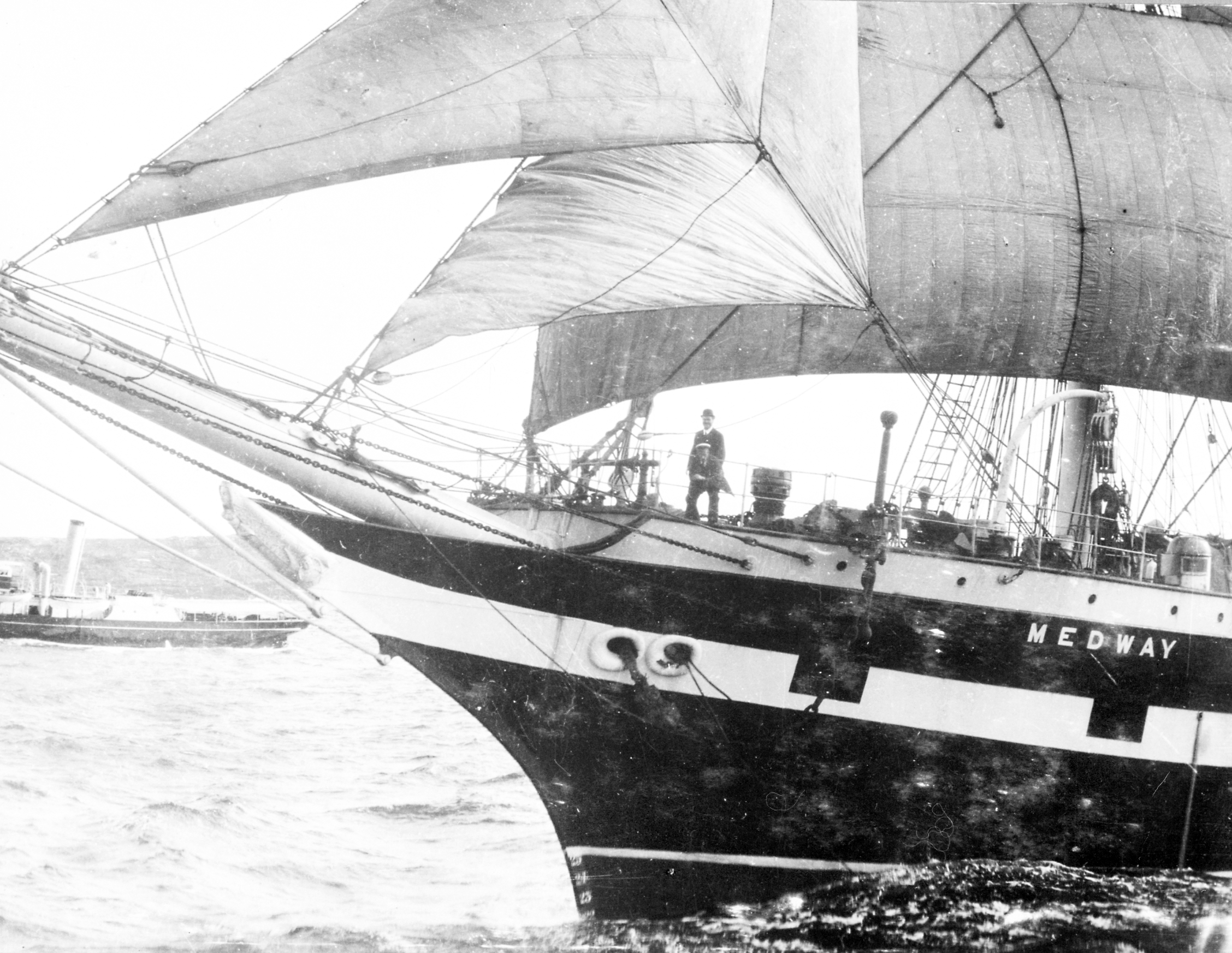

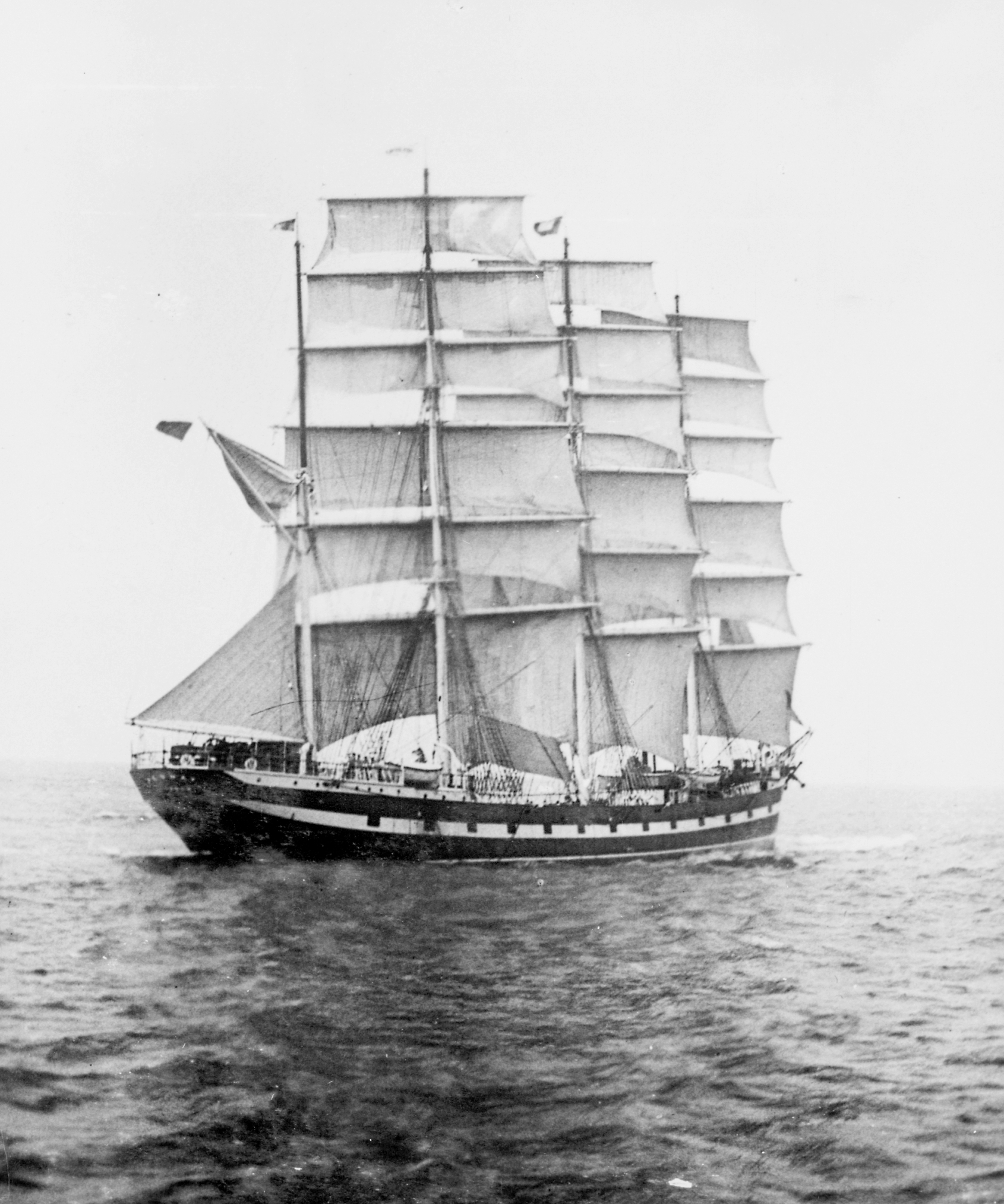

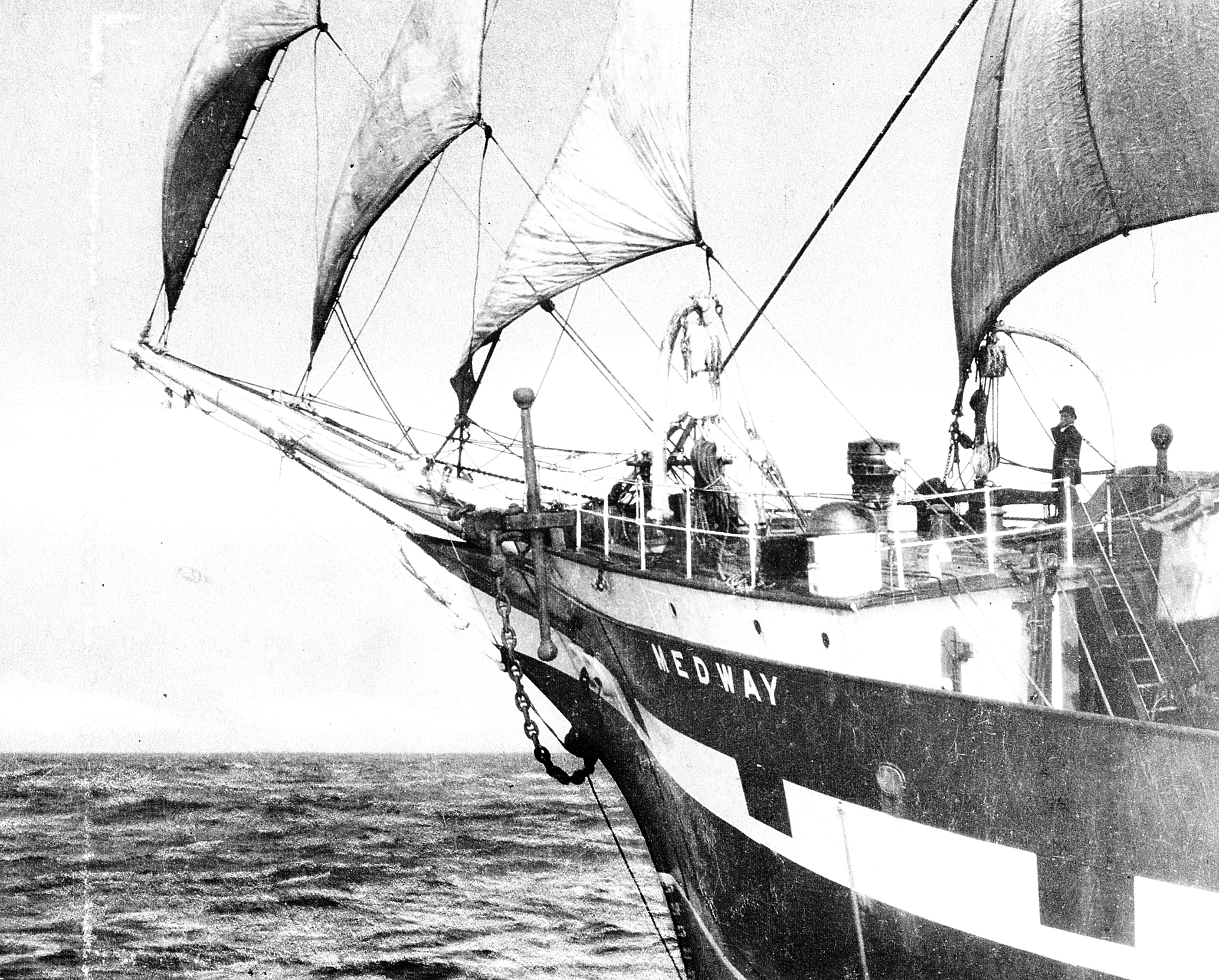

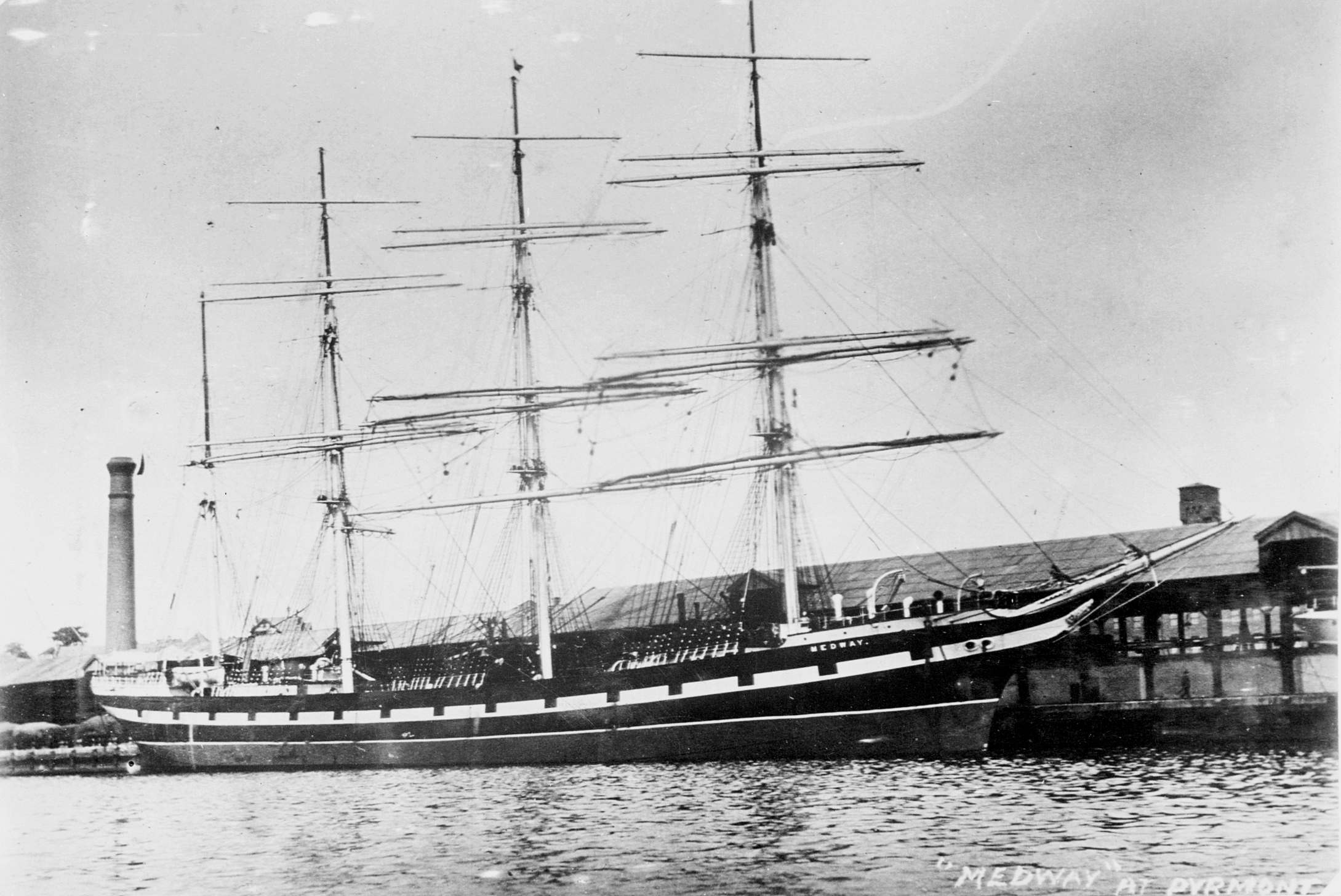

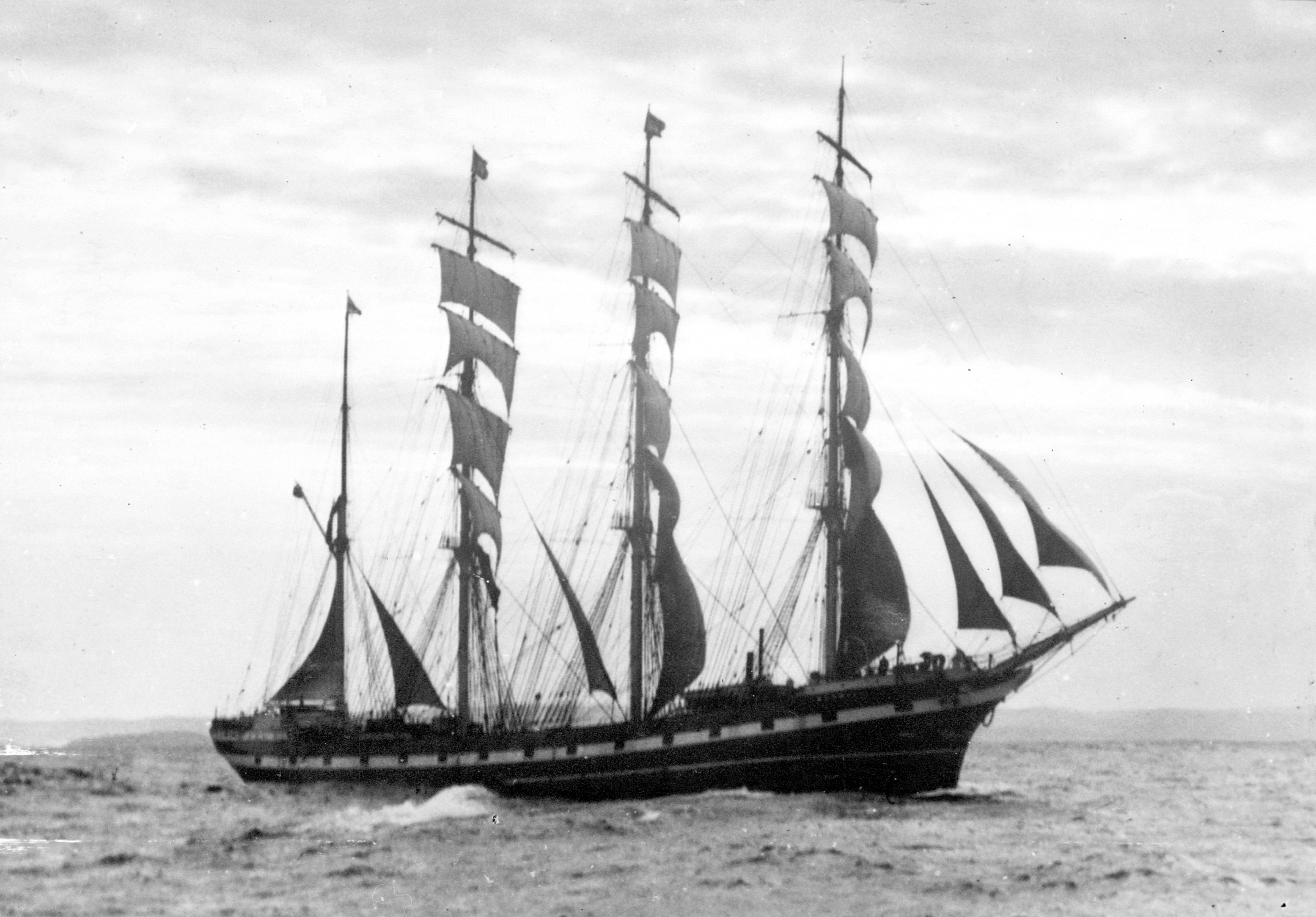

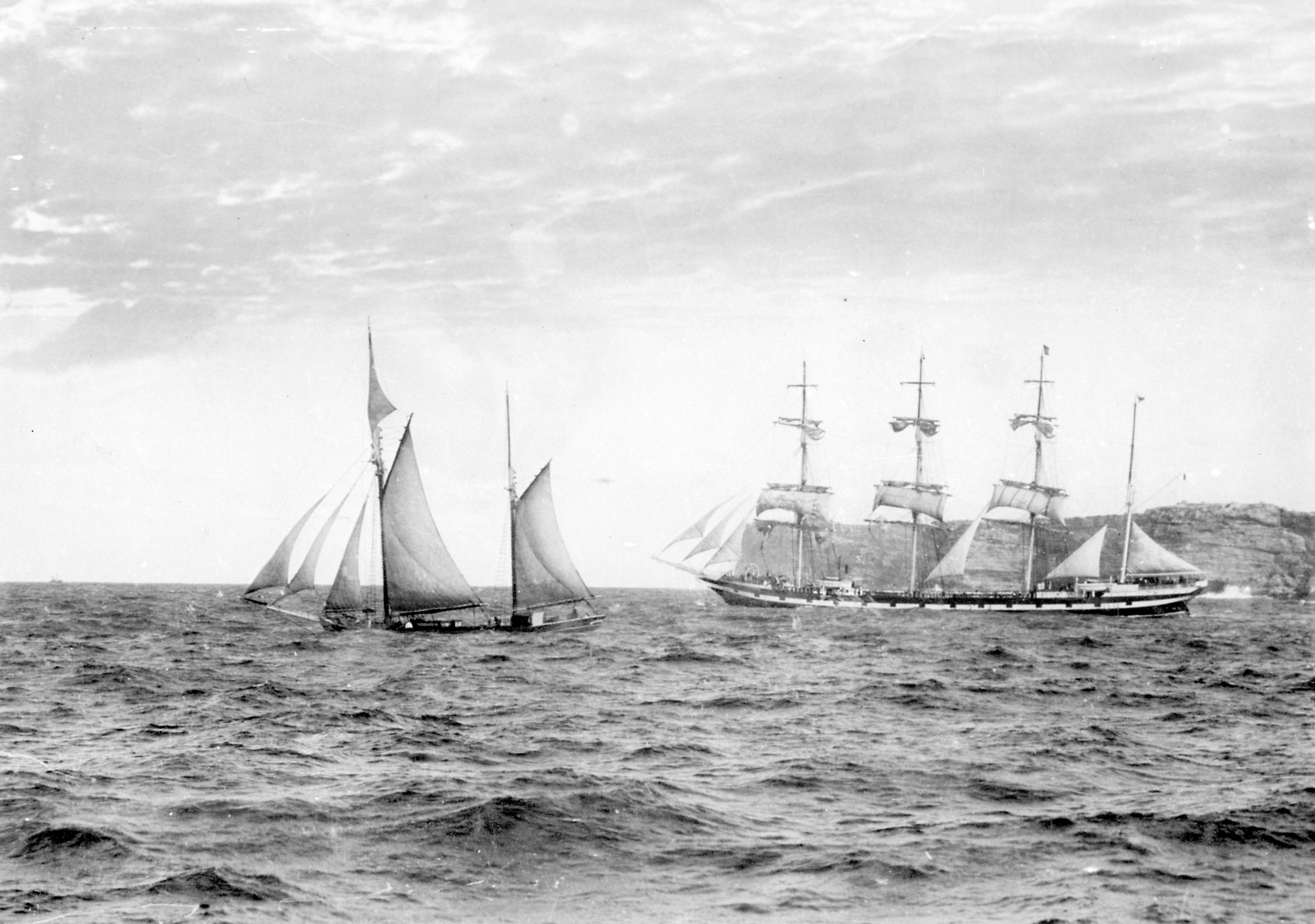

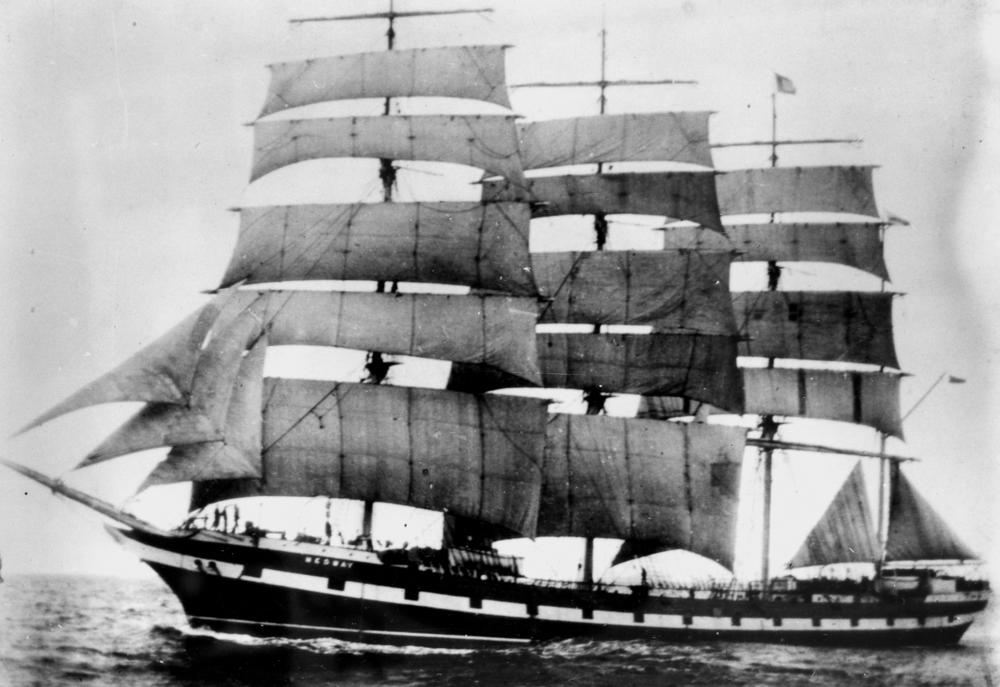

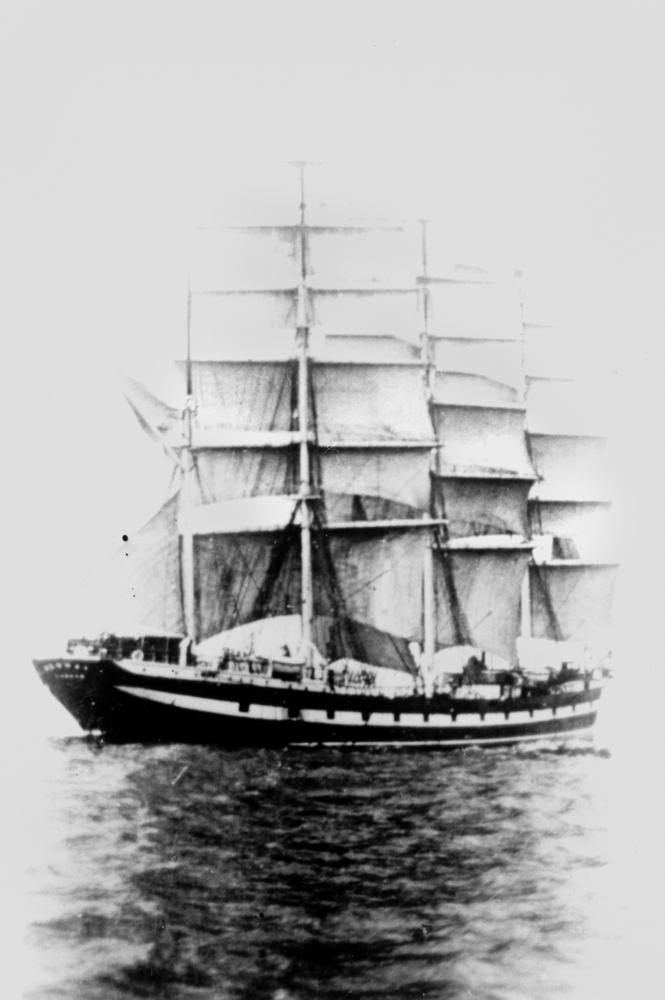

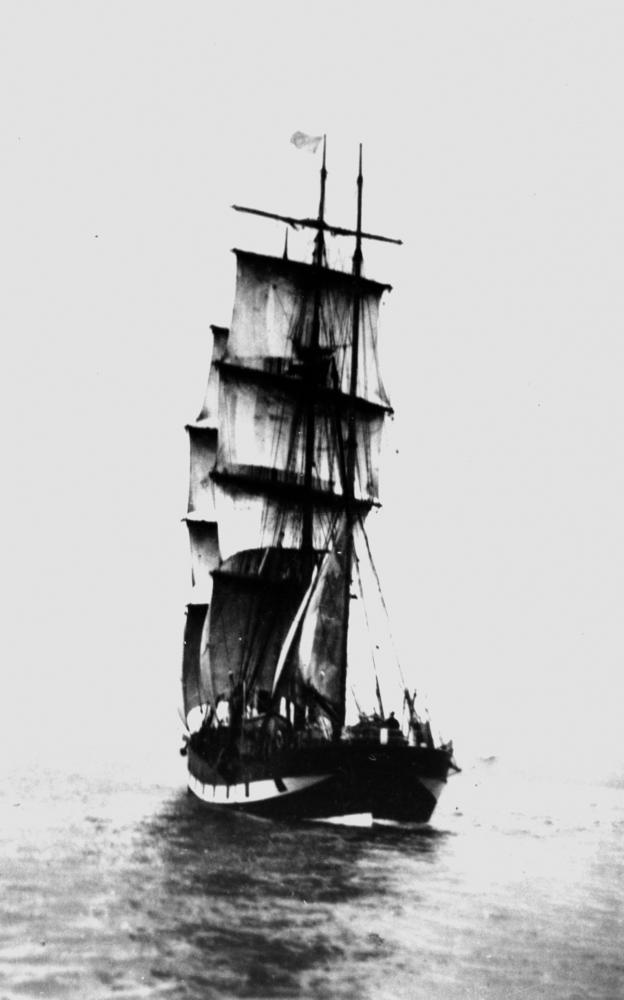
