= Midway, California =

Midway, California may refer to:

- Midway, Alameda County, California
- Midway, Kern County, California
- Midway, San Diego, a neighborhood
