= Midway, Iowa =

Midway may refer to the following places in the U.S. state of Iowa:

- Midway, Floyd County, Iowa, an unincorporated community
- Midway, Johnson County, Iowa, a ghost town
- Midway, Linn County, Iowa, an unincorporated community
- Midway, Woodbury County, Iowa, an unincorporated community
- Midway Beach, Iowa, an unincorporated community
