= Midway, Kentucky (disambiguation) =

Midway, Kentucky is a city in Woodford County, Kentucky, United States.

Midway, Kentucky may also refer to:

- Midway, Calloway County, Kentucky, an unincorporated community
- Midway, Crittenden County, Kentucky, an unincorporated community
- Midway, Edmonson County, Kentucky, an unincorporated community
- Midway, Meade County, Kentucky, an unincorporated community
