= Midway, Raleigh County, West Virginia =

Midway, West Virginia
- Unincorporated community
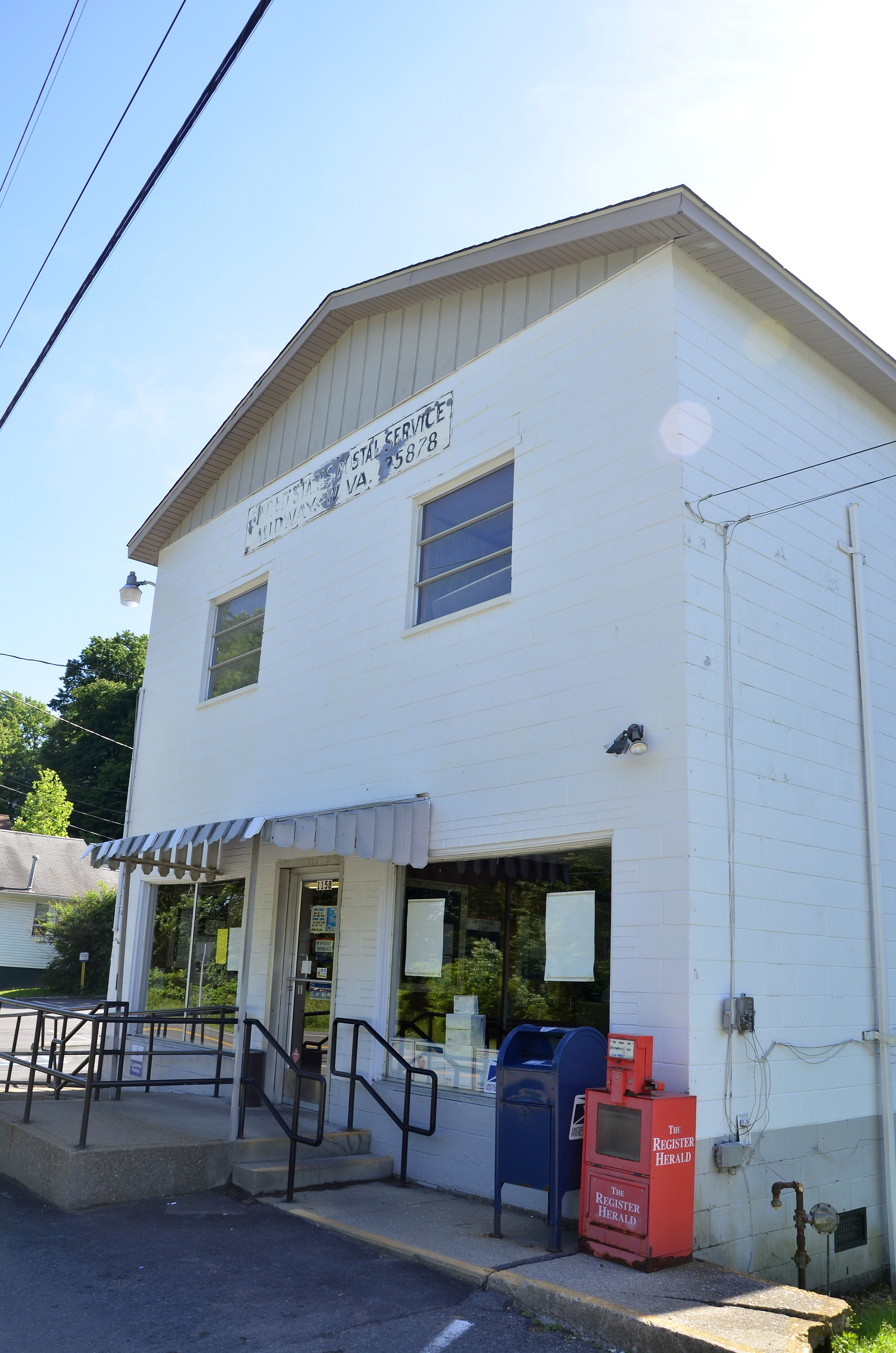
- Post office in Midway

- Location within West Virginia Location within the United States
- Coordinates: 37°43′10″N 81°14′13″W
- Country: United States
- State: West Virginia
- County: Raleigh
- Elevation: 2,533 ft (772 m)
- Time zone: UTC-5 (Eastern (EST))
  - Summer (DST): UTC-4 (EDT)
- Area codes: 304 & 681
- GNIS feature ID: 1543237

Midway is an unincorporated community in Raleigh County, West Virginia, United States. Midway is located between Sophia and Crab Orchard.
