= Midway, Bedford County, Tennessee =

Midway, Tennessee
- Unincorporated community
- Location within Tennessee Location within the United States
- Coordinates: 35°25′45″N 86°19′22″W
- Country: United States
- State: Tennessee
- County: Bedford
- Elevation: 797 ft (243 m)
- Time zone: UTC-6 (Central (CST))
  - Summer (DST): UTC-5 (CDT)
- Area code: 931
- GNIS feature ID: 1293724

Midway is an unincorporated community in Bedford County, Tennessee, United States. Midway is located on Tennessee State Route 276 and Thompson Creek 8.6 miles (13.8 km) east-southeast of Shelbyville.
