= Midway, Mercer County, West Virginia =

Midway, West Virginia
- Unincorporated community
- Location within the state of West Virginia Midway, West Virginia (the United States)
- Coordinates: 37°15′57″N 81°15′33″W
- Country: United States
- State: West Virginia
- County: Mercer
- Elevation: 2,500 ft (760 m)
- Time zone: UTC-5 (Eastern (EST))
  - Summer (DST): UTC-4 (EDT)
- Area codes: 304 & 681
- GNIS feature ID: 1555116

Midway is an unincorporated community in Mercer County, West Virginia, United States. Midway is located on County Route 11 near the northwest border of Bluefield.
