= Alaska Transportation Company =

Former transportation and shipping company

- Industry: Transportation and shipping
- Founded: 1898 in Seattle, Washington
- Defunct: 1948
- Key people: Andrew F. Burleigh; George W. Dickinson; Horatio S. Byrne; P. B. Weare; Captain James Griffiths; John A. Talbot; Winston Hones; Sven J. Swanson

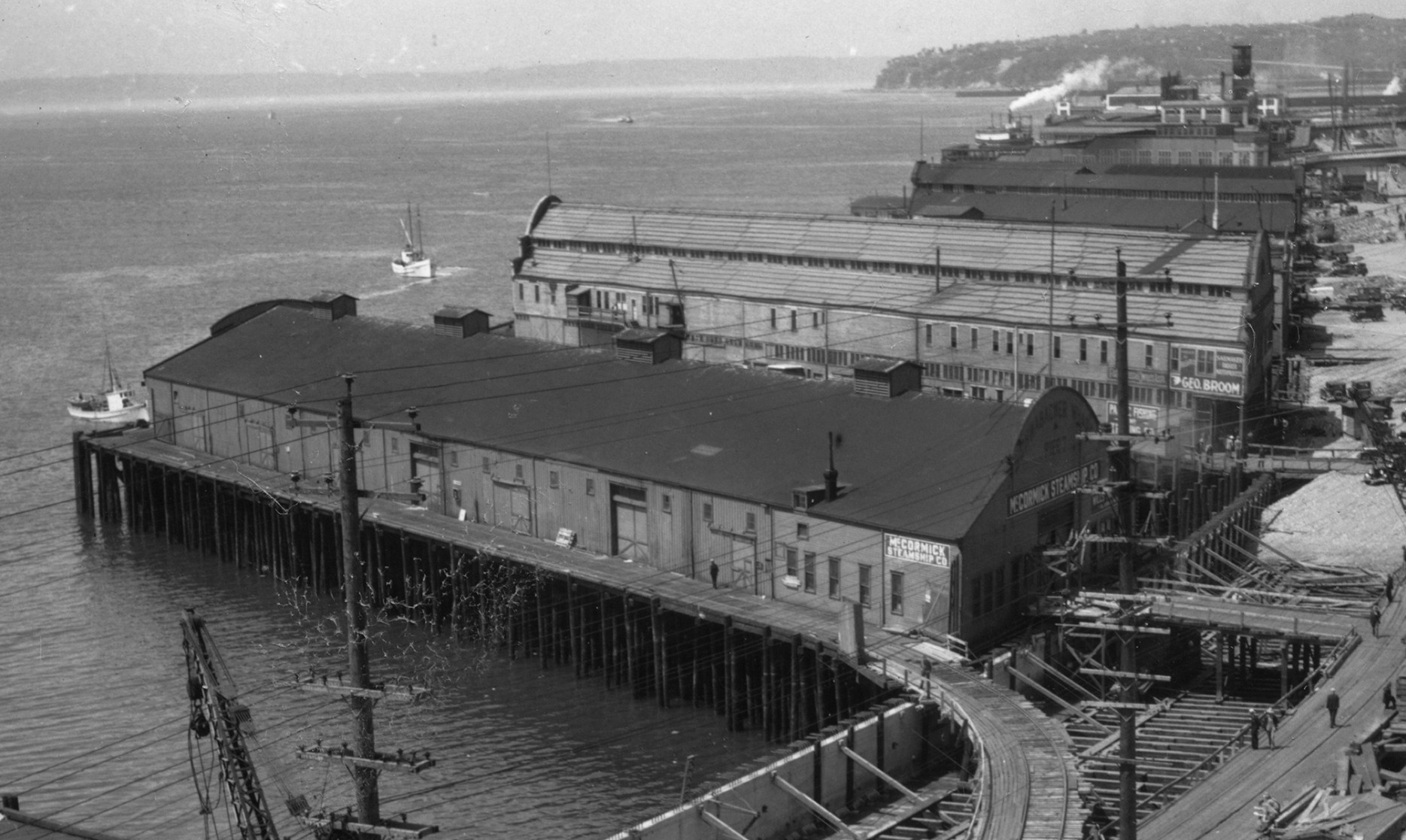
Alaska Transportation Company Seattle Wharf from 1938 to 1948

Alaska Transportation Company was founded on April 5, 1898, in Seattle, Washington by Andrew F. Burleigh (1846–1907) and George W. Dickinson. Alaska Transportation Company was formed to cash in on the gold rush happening around Dawson City and Nome in Canada, known as the Klondike Gold Rush. Klondike Gold Rush peaked between 1896 and 1899 in Klondike, Yukon. Alaska Transportation Company sold shares in the company to raise funds to build a ship to travel up the Yukon River. The ship would depart from Puget Sound ports. Moran Brothers Company of Seattle got the contract to build the nine steamships to be used. Alaska Transportation Company headquarters was at Pier 58 in Seattle. Both Andrew F. Burleigh and George W. Dickinson had previously worked for the Northern Pacific Railway as attorneys. Andrew F. Burleigh had a short law partnership with James B. Metcalfe and Charles W. Turner. Captain James Griffiths worked at Alaska Transportation Company before starting his own firm James Griffiths & Sons, Inc. In 1896 Andrew F. Burleigh founded the Yukon Company to operate ships and barges on the Yukon River. Alaska Transportation Company did not purchase surplus World War II ships, with an aged fleet of ships and competition from the Alaska Highway opened in 1942, the company closed in 1948.

Andrew F. Burleigh's plan for the Gold Rush to start at Kusawa Lake, where miners and cargo board his ships, the ships go down the Takhini River, and then down the Yukon River to Dawson City. By the time his ships were completed the peak of the Gold Rush was near its end. But his passenger, mail and cargo company did continue to serve Alaskan ports.

== World War II ==
Alaska Transportation Company fleet of ships were used to help the World War II effort. During World War II Alaska Transportation Company operated Merchant navy ships for the United States Shipping Board. During World War II Alaska Transportation Company was active with charter shipping with the Maritime Commission and War Shipping Administration. Alaska Transportation Company operated Liberty ships and Victory ships for the merchant navy. The ship was run by its Alaska Transportation Company crew and the US Navy supplied United States Navy Armed Guards to man the deck guns and radio.

== Ships ==
Ships owned:

- Minneapolis built in 1898, sold in 1900 to Atlantic Transport Line, requisitioned by UK government and was torpedoed by SM U-35 in 1916
- Willamette, was the Oregon Improvement Company's collier, covered for people and horses to gold rush. Used 1897 to 1903. Sold to Pacific Coast Company and renamed he SS Montana. IN 1920 she ran aground in 1920 near Nova Scotia.
- Mary F. Graff built in 1898 by Moran Brothers, Named for Mary F. Burleigh, née Graff (1874–1962, married in 1898), wife Andrew F. Burleigh.
- Oritani built in 1921, sold in 1939, renamed USS Midway (AG-41) in 1942.
- Wapama built in 1915, renamed Tongass delivered passengers, cargo, and mail to a few Alaskan ports (used 1937 to 1948).
- Two 5,000 ton ships built by John Roach & Sons

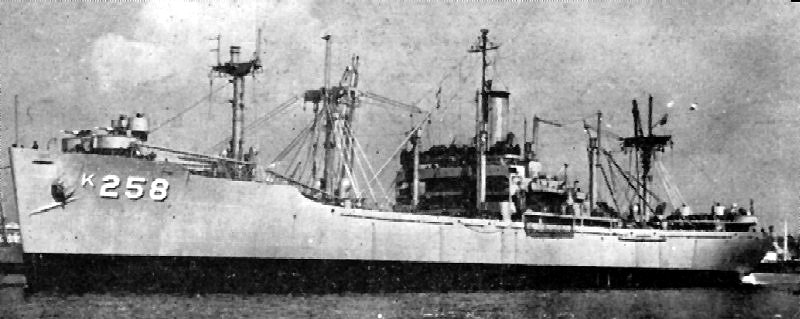
A Victory ship of World War II

Liberty ship of World War II

  - World War II:
  - Liberty ships:
- Hall J. Kelley
- Henry L. Abbott Sept. 7, 1949 was grounded off Hong Kong in typhoon, a total loss.
- Henry M. Stephens
- William Peffer
- George W. Alther
- David F. Barry

  - Victory ships:
- Dartmouth Victory
- SS Union Victory

- Type C1 ship
- MV Kenneth E. Gruennert

== See also ==
- World War II United States Merchant Navy
