= Midway, St. Mary Parish, Louisiana =

Midway, Louisiana
- Unincorporated community
- Location within Louisiana Location within the United States
- Coordinates: 29°39′19″N 91°29′29″W
- Country: United States
- State: Louisiana
- Parish: St. Mary
- Elevation: 3 ft (0.91 m)
- Time zone: UTC-6 (Central (CST))
  - Summer (DST): UTC-5 (CDT)
- Area code: 337
- GNIS feature ID: 1627652

Midway is an unincorporated community in St. Mary Parish, Louisiana, United States. Midway is located along Louisiana Highway 317, 9.7 miles (15.6 km) south of Franklin.
