= Midway, Alabama (disambiguation) =

Midway, Alabama is a town in Bullock County, Alabama, United States.

Midway, Alabama may also refer to:

- Midway, Butler County, Alabama, a place in Alabama
- Midway, Chilton County, Alabama, a place in Alabama
- Midway, Clarke County, Alabama, a place in Alabama
- Midway, Colbert County, Alabama, a place in Alabama
- Midway, Lawrence County, Alabama, a place in Alabama
- Midway, Monroe County, Alabama, on the Alabama State Route 83
- Midway, Wilcox County, Alabama, a place in Alabama
