= Medway Microlights =

British aircraft manufacturer

- Company type: Private company
- Industry: Aerospace
- Headquarters: Rochester, Kent, United Kingdom
- Products: Ultralight trikes Fixed wing microlight aircraft
- Website: ravenmad.co.uk

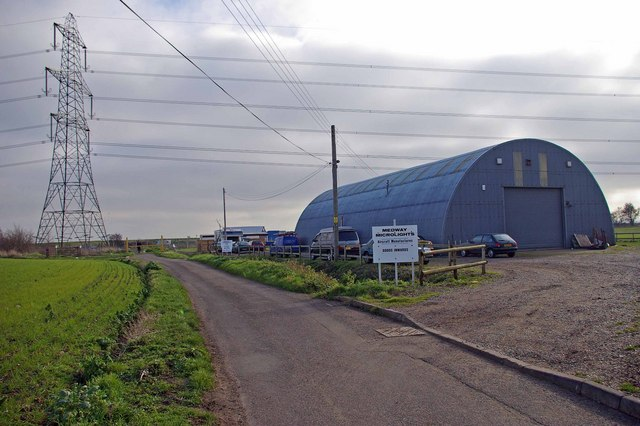
Medway Microlights factory

Medway Microlights was a British aircraft manufacturer located in Rochester, Kent. It specializing in the manufacture of ultralight trikes and fixed wing microlight aircraft. In 2018, it was acquired by The Light Aircraft Company (TLAC).

Medway Microlights was the oldest established approved microlight aircraft manufacturer in the UK and was known for the Raven Wing.

== Aircraft ==
Summary of aircraft built by Medway Microlights
| Model name | First flight | Number built | Type |
|---|---|---|---|
| Hybred 44XL | 1978 | | ultralight trike |
| HybredR | 1982 | | ultralight trike |
| Raven | 1982 | | ultralight trike |
| Rebel SS | 1988 | | ultralight trike |
| EclipseR | 1989 | | ultralight trike |
| Av8R | 2003 | | ultralight trike |
| SLA100 Executive | 2003 | | fixed wing microlight |
| SLA 80 Executive | 2003 | | fixed wing microlight |
