= Midway, Pennsylvania =

Midway is the name of some places in the U.S. state of Pennsylvania:

- Midway, Adams County, Pennsylvania, a census-designated place
- Midway, Berks County, Pennsylvania
- Midway, Washington County, Pennsylvania, a borough
