= Midway Airlines =

Midway Airlines was the name of two different, defunct airlines of the United States:

- Midway Airlines (1976–1991), airline based in Chicago, Illinois
- Midway Airlines (1993–2003), airline based in Morrisville, North Carolina
