= Midway, Mississippi =

Midway, Mississippi may refer to the following places in the U.S. state of Mississippi:

- Midway, Copiah County, Mississippi, an unincorporated community
- Midway, Hinds County, Mississippi, an unincorporated community
- Midway, Leake County, Mississippi, an unincorporated community
- Midway, Scott County, Mississippi, an unincorporated community
- Midway, Tallahatchie County, Mississippi, a ghost town
- Midway, Tishomingo County, Mississippi, an unincorporated community
- Midway, Yazoo County, Mississippi, an unincorporated community
