= Midway, Joplin =

Neighborhood in Joplin, Missouri, U.S.

Coordinates: 37.054°N 94.501°W

Midway was a former village located in northern Newton County, Missouri. It was completely surrounded by the city of Joplin except for the east side where it shared city limits with Sunnyvale. Both it and Sunnyvale have now merged with the city of Joplin. It was located on the south side of 32nd Street (Missouri Supplemental Route FF).
