= USS Midway (AG-41) =

Cargo ship of the United States Navy

History

United States
- Name: USS Midway
- Namesake: Midway Atoll
- Owner: Alaska Transportation Company, Seattle, Washington
- Builder: Todd Shipyards Corporation, Brooklyn, New York
- Laid down: date unknown
- Completed: in 1921
- Acquired: by the Navy on bareboat charter
- Commissioned: 10 April 1942 as USS Midway (AG-41) at Puget Sound Navy Yard
- Decommissioned: 24 May 1946
- Renamed: Tyee in 1939; USS Panay (AG-41), 3 April 1943
- Stricken: date unknown
- Fate: Returned to her owner at war's end

General characteristics
- Type: commercial cargo ship
- Tonnage: 2,250 tons
- Displacement: 1,622 tons
- Length: 238 ft 8 in (72.75 m)
- Beam: 33 ft 8 in (10.26 m)
- Draft: 16 ft 9 in (5.11 m)
- Propulsion: unknown, single propeller
- Speed: 11.5 knots
- Troops: 300
- Complement: 86 officers and enlisted
- Armament: one single 3 in (76 mm) gun mount

USS Midway (AG-41), later renamed as USS Panay (AG-41), was a commercial cargo ship leased by the United States Navy during World War II. She was used by the Navy as a cargo ship and as a troop transport in the North Pacific Ocean. She was returned to her owner at war's end.

== History ==
The first ship to be named Midway by the Navy, she was built in 1921 as Oritani by Todd Shipyards Corporation, Brooklyn, New York, and renamed Tyee in 1939; was acquired by the Navy on a bareboat charter through the War Shipping Administration (WSA) from Alaska Transportation Company, Seattle, Washington; and commissioned at Puget Sound Navy Yard 10 April 1942.

Classified as general auxiliary, Midway operated along the Pacific coast between ports of the Northwestern United States and American bases in Alaska and the Aleutians. In January 1943 she steamed to Pearl Harbor and shuttled troops, provisions and equipment between the islands of the central Pacific.

Renamed Panay 3 April 1943 to allow the name to be used for a new aircraft carrier, she resumed the Alaskan run in the summer and continued this vital service to military and naval units in the far north through the end of the war.

Panay was decommissioned 24 May 1946 and was returned to her owner.
