= Medway Creek (Ontario) =

Watercourse in Ontario, Canada

Coordinates: 43.1°N 81.3°W

Medway Creek is a tributary of the Thames River in southwestern Ontario, Canada, draining into the North branch of the Thames at the University of Western Ontario.

Medway Creek runs a 214 km watercourse, providing a 205 km^{2} watershed, the majority of which is Middlesex county farmland. The Creek begins just north of Elginfield Rd (Highway #7), just east of Lucan, Ontario. Tributaries that flow into Medway Creek include Cook Drain, Elginfield Drain, Edgewood Drain, White-Fitzgerald Drain, Risdon Drain, Mills-Guest Drain, Colbert Drain and Snake Creek.

30% of the watercourse is natural, while 49% is channeled; the final 21% is buried in tile drains.

The Creek drains just after running through the Medway Heritage Forest in Northwest London, which is one of the few wooded areas that still hides the creek from housing development or farmland. Traveling north on Highway #4 (Richmond St.), one can plainly see the creek's wandering path, as it frequently crosses the road. However, 34% of the riparian zone, a 30-metre buffer on each side of the creek, is in permanent vegetation (forest and meadows).

== Features of the watershed ==
- 83% of the land is used for agriculture. A large portion of the soils in the watershed are silt and clay loams.
- The Arva Moraine Wetlands Complex is a provincially significant wetland. Three other wetlands are locally significant.
- Groundwater is a source of drinking water in a large portion of the watershed, including a municipal water system in Birr. Groundwater supports wetlands, forests and streams; approximately 65% of local stream flow is fed by groundwater.
- 46 fish and 13 freshwater mussel species have been recorded in Medway Creek. Gamefish include Smallmouth and Largemouth Bass, Northern Pike and Rainbow Trout. Most of the watercourse has a higher average temperature, which supports warmwater species.

== See also ==
- List of Ontario rivers
