= Midway Township =

Midway Township may refer to:

- Midway Township, Hot Spring County, Arkansas, in Hot Spring County, Arkansas
- Midway Township, Cottonwood County, Minnesota
- Midway Township, St. Louis County, Minnesota
- Midway Township, Davidson County, North Carolina, in Davidson County, North Carolina
- Midway Township, Stutsman County, North Dakota, in Stutsman County, North Dakota
