= George G. Dibrell =

American politician (1822–1888)

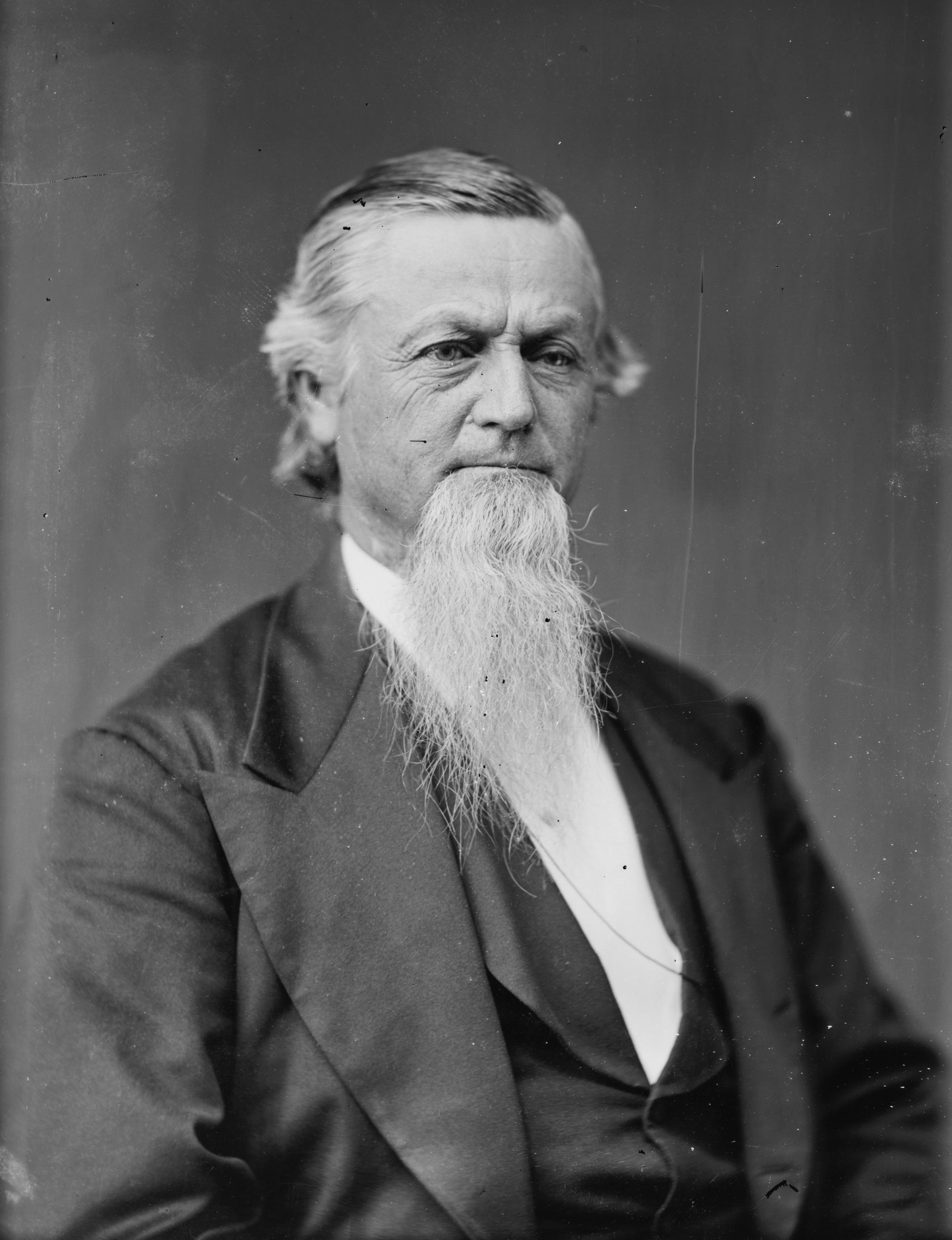

Member of the U.S. House of Representatives from Tennessee's 3rd district
- In office March 4, 1875 – March 3, 1885
- Preceded by: William Crutchfield
- Succeeded by: John R. Neal

Member of the Tennessee House of Representatives
- In office 1861

Personal details
- Born: George Gibbs Dibrell; April 12, 1822 Sparta, Tennessee, US
- Died: May 9, 1888 (aged 66) Sparta, Tennessee, US
- Party: Democratic
- Spouse: Mary E. Leftwich Dibrell
- Children: Wamon L. Dibrell; Frank Simpson Dibrell
- Education: East Tennessee University
- Profession: lawyer, farmer, merchant, judge, banker, railroad executive

Military service
- Allegiance: Confederate States of America
- Branch/service: Confederate States Army
- Years of service: 1861–1865
- Rank: Brigadier General
- Unit: 25th Tennessee Infantry
- Commands: 8th Tennessee Cavaly; Dibrell's Cavalry Brigade; Dibrell's Cavalry Division
- Battles/wars: American Civil War

George Gibbs Dibrell (April 12, 1822 – May 9, 1888) was an American lawyer and a five-term member of the United States House of Representatives from the 3rd Congressional District of Tennessee. He also served as a general in the Confederate States Army during the American Civil War and as a railroad executive.

== Biography ==
Dibrell was born in Sparta, Tennessee, on 12 April 1822. His ancestors were Huguenot refugees from France who settled in Virginia in 1700. His grandfather fought as a Patriot in the American Revolution and married into a branch of the Lee family in Virginia. His father, Anthony Dibrell, arrived in White County, Tennessee, in 1811, where he served as a circuit court clerk, state legislator, was once a Whig candidate for Congress, and eventually the State Treasurer of Tennessee.

Dibrell worked on his father's farm during the summer, and at the age of 15 he travelled alone to Virginia and Mississippi with droves of livestock. What little formal education Dibrell received came at the local schools during the winter months, followed by one session at the University of Tennessee at Knoxville at age 16.

In 1842 George Dibrell married Mary Elizabeth Leftwich, also a Sparta native. The daughter of a Virginia merchant, Miss Leftwich obtained a lady's education at the Nashville Female Academy. She and her husband both became members of the Southern Methodist Church in the same year they were married. They attended the Methodist congregation at Sparta, where Mary taught Sunday school. Later that year they welcomed the first of their eight children.

== Antebellum career ==
Dibrell studied law, was admitted to the bar in 1843, and established a legal practice. While engaged in agricultural and mercantile pursuits, Dibrell was elected clerk of the branch of the Bank of Tennessee at Sparta. He was a justice of the peace and a county clerk for White County for many years. By 1850 he had managed to accumulate an estate worth $500. Ten years later in 1860, the total value of Dibrell's personal estate had increased to $27,000, making him one of the top five wealthiest landowners in the county.

The 1850 United States Census, Slave Schedule, for White County, indicates that Dibrell owned four mulatto slaves: a woman of 45 years, a girl of 12, and two boys of four and two years. The 1860 census record lists Dibrell as owning 16 slaves, ranging in age from 1–50 years in age. From the end of his time as clerk at the Bank of Tennessee until the beginning of the War, Dibrell carried on in commerce, his occupation in the 1850 census indicating "merchant."

== Political and military service ==
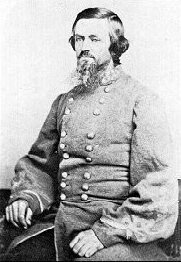
General Dibrell

=== Overview ===
Dibrell volunteered in the Confederate States Army and served from 1861 to 1865. He rose from private in the 25th Tennessee Infantry to lieutenant colonel of that regiment in August 1861. He fought in the Mill Springs campaign and at the Siege of Corinth. Dibrell later organized the White County "Partisan Rangers," raised the 8th Tennessee Cavalry, and served as its first colonel. Commanding a brigade, he played a prominent role in the defense of the important saltworks during the Battle of Saltville. He served under noted cavalry generals Nathan Bedford Forrest and Joseph Wheeler.

Promoted to brigadier general in early 1865, Dibrell commanded a division under Wheeler during the Carolinas campaign and its climactic Battle of Bentonville. He accompanied the flight of the Confederate government following the evacuation and fall of Richmond in April 1865, having charge of protecting the national archives of the Confederacy and escorting President Jefferson Davis from Greensboro, North Carolina, into Georgia. He was finally captured and paroled near Washington, Georgia, on May 9, 1865.

=== 1861–1862 ===
As the secession movement swept the South, Dibrell was elected as a Union delegate to the Tennessee State Constitutional Convention in July 1861, which would debate the prospect of secession, but it was voted against and never met. Dibrell was also elected to represent White County in the 1861 Tennessee State Legislature, where he served but several weeks before joining the Confederate States Army.

George Dibrell left for the Confederate military service in the summer of 1861, leaving behind his wife Mary and seven children, ranging in age from sixteen years to one year old. He travelled to Camp Zollicoffer near Livingston, Tennessee, to enlist with the 25th Tennessee Infantry on 10 August 1861. He brought with him two horses worth $200 each. At Livingston he was elected Lieutenant Colonel of the regiment. After three months’ drilling, the 25th marched as part of a larger force under Brigadier General Zollicoffer to Camp Beech Grove, just across the Cumberland River from Mill Springs, Kentucky, in advance of a threatened Federal invasion from nearby Somerset or Colombia to the west, and to break up Kentuckian Federal home guard units.

This immediately preceded the Battle of Fishings Creek (more generally known as the Battle of Mill Springs or Logan's Crossroads) on 19 January 1862, one of the first significant Union victories of the Civil War, which helped break the Confederate defensive line. Zollicoffer fell during the battle, at which point the Confederate forces were outflanked and retreated in disorder. Dibrell and the 25th Tennessee formed the Confederate left flank which was turned by the Union commander. The Confederates fell back that night across the Cumberland River, leaving behind their artillery, wagons, horses, and all of their supplies and ammunition. Confederate loss totaled about 400 killed, wounded, and captured.

In May 1862, the 25th Tennessee was reorganized at Corinth, and Dibrell was defeated in his bid for the Lieutenant Colonelcy. Dibrell was discharged from the regiment on 10 May 1862, with three months remaining on his period of enlistment. He then travelled to Richmond where he obtained permission to raise a regiment for Confederate service, after which he returned home to Sparta. There he organized an independent force of cavalry as partisan rangers. This regiment, which entered service as the 8th Tennessee Cavalry (sometimes called the 13th), was organized at Yankeetown, a short distance from downtown Sparta, on 4 September 1862, and totaled 920 men in twelve companies. George Dibrell was elected Colonel. His eldest son Wayman Leftwich Dibrell joined the regiment (before its official organization) as a 2nd Lieutenant on 2 August 1862, at the age of 19 years, 8 months.

=== Politics ===
Dibrell was a delegate to the Tennessee state constitutional convention in 1870. Elected as a Democrat to the Forty-fourth and the four succeeding Congresses, Dibrell served from March 4, 1875, to March 3, 1885. He was not a candidate for renomination in 1884 and resumed agriculture and business pursuits, including the development of several coal mines.

== Post-war Pursuits ==
=== Overview ===
Owner of over fifteen thousand acres in White County, Dibrell established the Bon Air Coal & Coke Company, which became one of the county's leading industries and largest employers. Also a key figure in the development of the Southwestern Railroad, which connected Sparta with the Nashville and Chattanooga line, he was President of that railroad in 1869. Dibrell also served as a delegate to the Methodist conference at Memphis in 1870, and at Nashville in 1882.

=== Railroads ===
Shortly after returning to his home and family in mid-1865, Dibrell commenced the process of renewing the vitality of his hometown. This began by bringing in branches of the McMinnville and Manchester Railroad, Nashville and Chattanooga Company (N. C. & St. L.), and the Southwestern Railroad Company, with the object of opening up the somewhat geographically- and thus commercially isolated county. The former two of these companies completed the first rail lines in the state before the war, connecting Nashville, McMinnville, and Tullahoma. Hitherto, livestock and other marketable goods had to be driven or carried over land, much as Dibrell did in his youth. Plans existed to extend a branch from McMinnville to Sparta as early as 1858, but these were cancelled by the impending conflict. Dibrell became a director of the Southwestern Railroad Company three years before he was elected as its president in 1869. He remained in this position for 15 years until the company was acquired by the Nashville and Chattanooga Company and the railroad came to Sparta in 1884. The advent of the railroad in White County fulfilled "a great need for a speedier method of moving the products of an expanding and developing land."

=== Bon Air Coal ===
As the railroads slowly began to take shape, Dibrell focused his efforts towards the formation and organization of the Bon Air Coal, Land, and Lumber Company, concentrated on Bon Air Mountain just outside of Sparta. According to White County historian E.G. Rogers, the organization of this company had been a dream of Dibrell's and one which he had sought to further as early as his brief tenure in the Tennessee Legislature. Additionally, Dibrell possessed the foresight and entrepreneurial business sense to invest money from his antebellum mercantile success in the gradual accumulation of more than 15,000 acres of good coal and timber land, which formed the company's property upon its organization. The official charter was finally secured in September 1882, and by 1900 the company's holdings had grown to include some 38,000 acres of land. Dibrell was elected the vice-president of the company upon his declination of the presidency itself, which was filled by former governor and president of the 1870 convention, John C. Brown.

== Death ==
George Gibbs Dibrell died on 9 May 1888, at his home in Sparta, aged 66 years and 27 days. The cause was an "aggravated inflammation of the kidneys," a recurring problem irritated by a strenuous 40-mile horseback ride taken two weeks prior. He was survived by his eight children, plus a number of grandchildren, in addition to his wife Mary. His funeral services were performed by the same minister who married them 46 years earlier. The announcement of his death in the "Daily American," a Nashville newspaper, read "[Dibrell] has done more for White County than any man who ever lived here [...] This is the unanimous verdict of all." He is interred at the Old Sparta Cemetery.

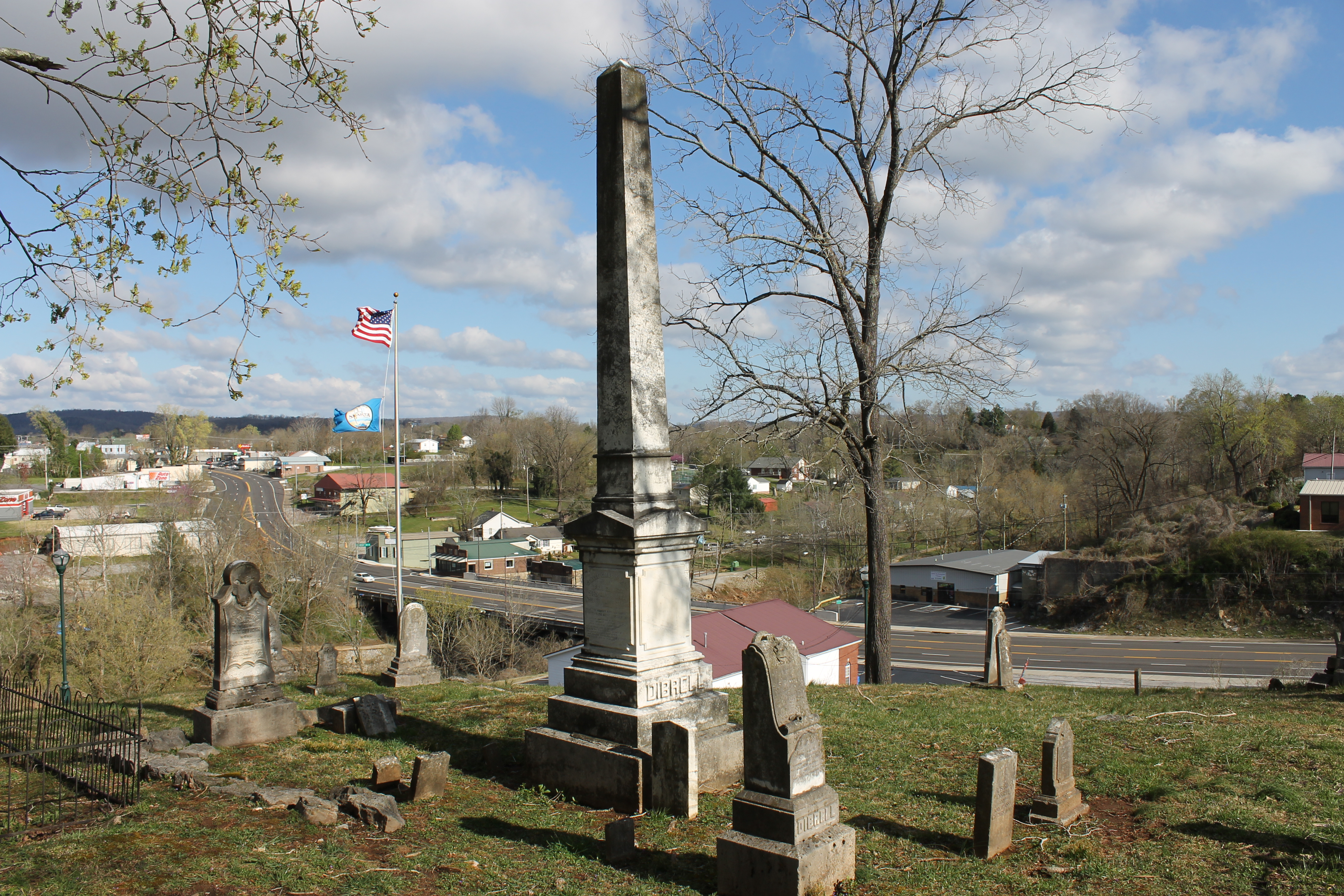
George Dibrell's grave overlooks a part of downtown Sparta, Tennessee, from its vantage point in Old Sparta Cemetery.

== See also ==
- List of American Civil War generals (Confederate)

== Notes ==
U.S. House of Representatives
Preceded by William Crutchfield	Member of the U.S. House of Representatives from Tennessee's 3rd congressional district 1875–1885	Succeeded by John R. Neal
