= List of Louisville and Nashville Railroad precursors =

These railroads were bought, leased, or in other ways had their track come under ownership or lease by the Louisville and Nashville Railroad.

In 1902, the Atlantic Coast Line Railroad gained a majority of stock in the L&N, but it continued to operate as a separate company until its merger in 1982 into the Seaboard System Railroad.

The Georgia Railroad and the West Point Route were partly owned by the L&N.

== Alabama and Florida Railroad of Florida ==
- Alabama, Florida and Georgia RailRoad
  - Florida, Alabama and Georgia RailRoad

== Alabama Mineral Railroad ==
- Anniston and Atlantic Railroad
- Anniston and Cincinnati Railroad

== Atlanta, Knoxville and Northern Railway ==
- Marietta and North Georgia Railroad
  - Knoxville Southern Railroad

== Louisville, Cincinnati and Lexington Railway ==
- Louisville, Cincinnati and Lexington
  - Lexington and Frankfort Railroad 1869
    - Lexington and Ohio Railroad 1849
  - Louisville and Frankfort Railroad 1869

== Louisville, Henderson and St. Louis Railway ==
- Louisville, St. Louis and Texas Railway

== Mammoth Cave Railroad ==
- Mammoth Cave Railroad

== Mobile and Montgomery Railway ==
- Alabama and Florida Railroad

== Monon Railroad ==
- Chicago, Indianapolis and Louisville Railway
  - Chicago and Dyer Railway
  - Chicago and Indianapolis Terminal Company
  - Chicago and Wabash Valley Railroad
  - Louisville, New Albany and Chicago Railroad
    - Bedford and Bloomfield Railroad
      - Bedford, Springville, Owensburg and Bloomfield Railroad
    - Chicago and Indianapolis Air Line Railway
    - Orleans, West Baden and French Lick Springs Railway

== Nashville, Chattanooga and St. Louis Railway ==
Nashville, Chattanooga and St. Louis Railway

- Bon Air Railroad (Tennessee)
- Duck River Valley Narrow Gauge Railroad (Tennessee)
- Huntsville and Elora Railroad (Alabama)
- Inman Branch (Tennessee)
- McMinnville and Manchester Railroad (Tennessee)
- Middle Tennessee and Alabama Railway
- Nashville and Chattanooga Railroad
  - Nashville and North Western Railroad (Tennessee)
    - Hickman and Obion Railroad
- Nashville and Tuscaloosa Railroad with Allen's Creek Extension (Tennessee)
- Paducah, Tennessee and Alabama Railroad
  - Paducah and Tennessee Railroad of Kentucky
  - Paducah and Tennessee Railway of Tennessee
  - Tennessee Midland Railroad
- Pikeville Branch (Tennessee)
- Rome Railroad (Georgia)
- Sequatchie Valley Railroad
- Southwestern Railroad (Tennessee)
- Tennessee and Coosa Railroad (Alabama)
- Tennessee and Pacific Railroad (Tennessee)
- Tracy City Branch (Tennessee)
- West Nashville Branch (Tennessee)
- Western and Atlantic Railroad (Georgia and Tennessee)
- Winchester and Alabama Railroad (Alabama)

== Pensacola and Louisville Railroad Company ==
- Alabama and Florida Rail Road Company
