= Quebeck, Tennessee =

- Unincorporated community
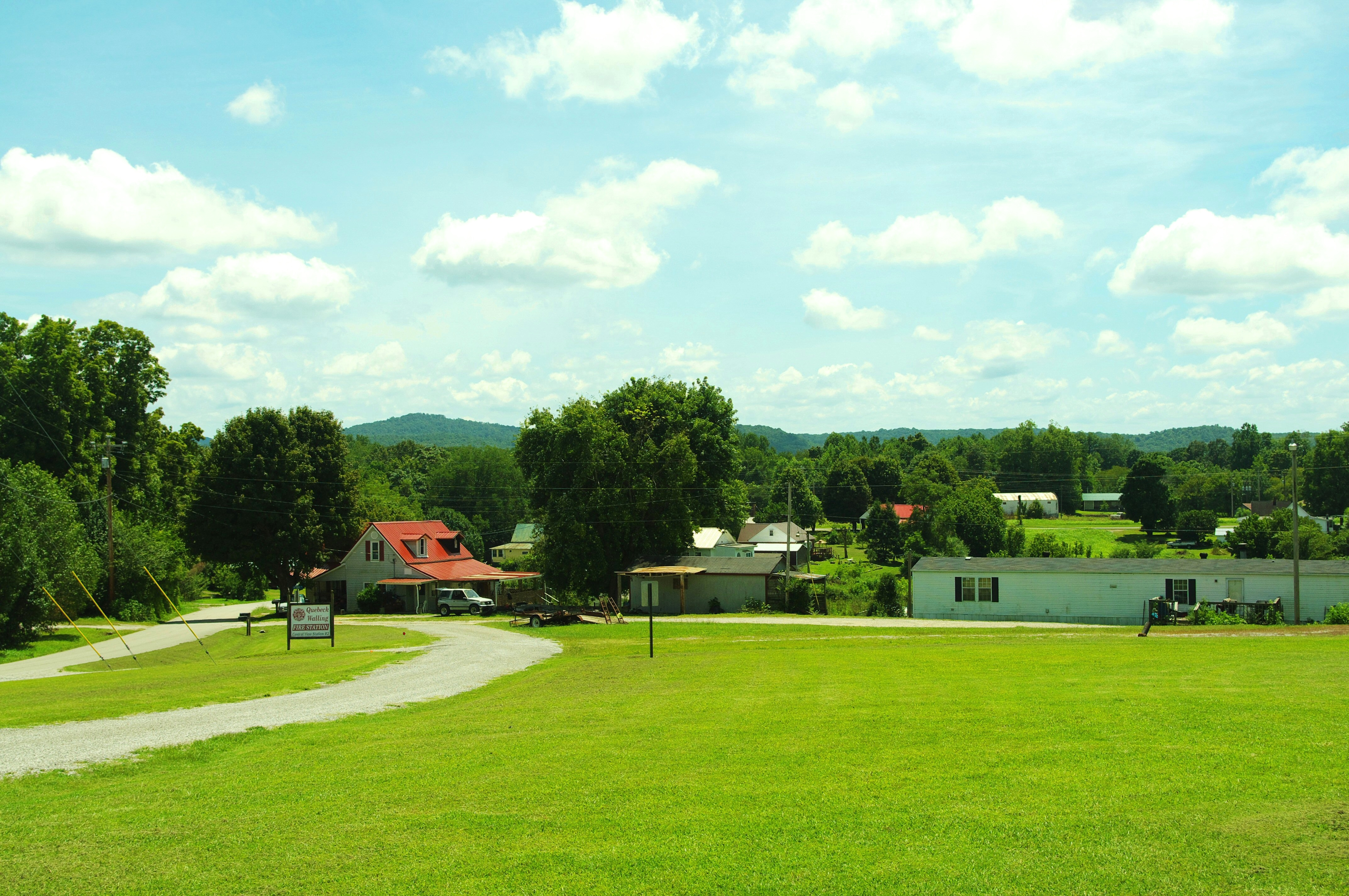
- View from the Quebeck Community Center

- Location within Tennessee Location within the United States
- Coordinates: 35°49′00″N 85°34′01″W
- Country: United States
- State: Tennessee
- County: White
- Elevation: 902 ft (275 m)
- Time zone: UTC-6 (Central (CST))
  - Summer (DST): UTC-5 (CDT)
- ZIP code: 38579
- Area code: 931
- GNIS feature ID: 1298751

Quebeck is an unincorporated community in White County, Tennessee, United States. It is located just off U.S. Route 70, southwest of Doyle and northeast of Rock Island, and roughly adjacent to Walling. Quebeck had a post office with ZIP code 38579.

The community was founded in the late 1880s by J.S. Cooper, a local sawmill owner. He named it for the Canadian province of Quebec, having been inspired by his travels there.
