= Burgess Falls =

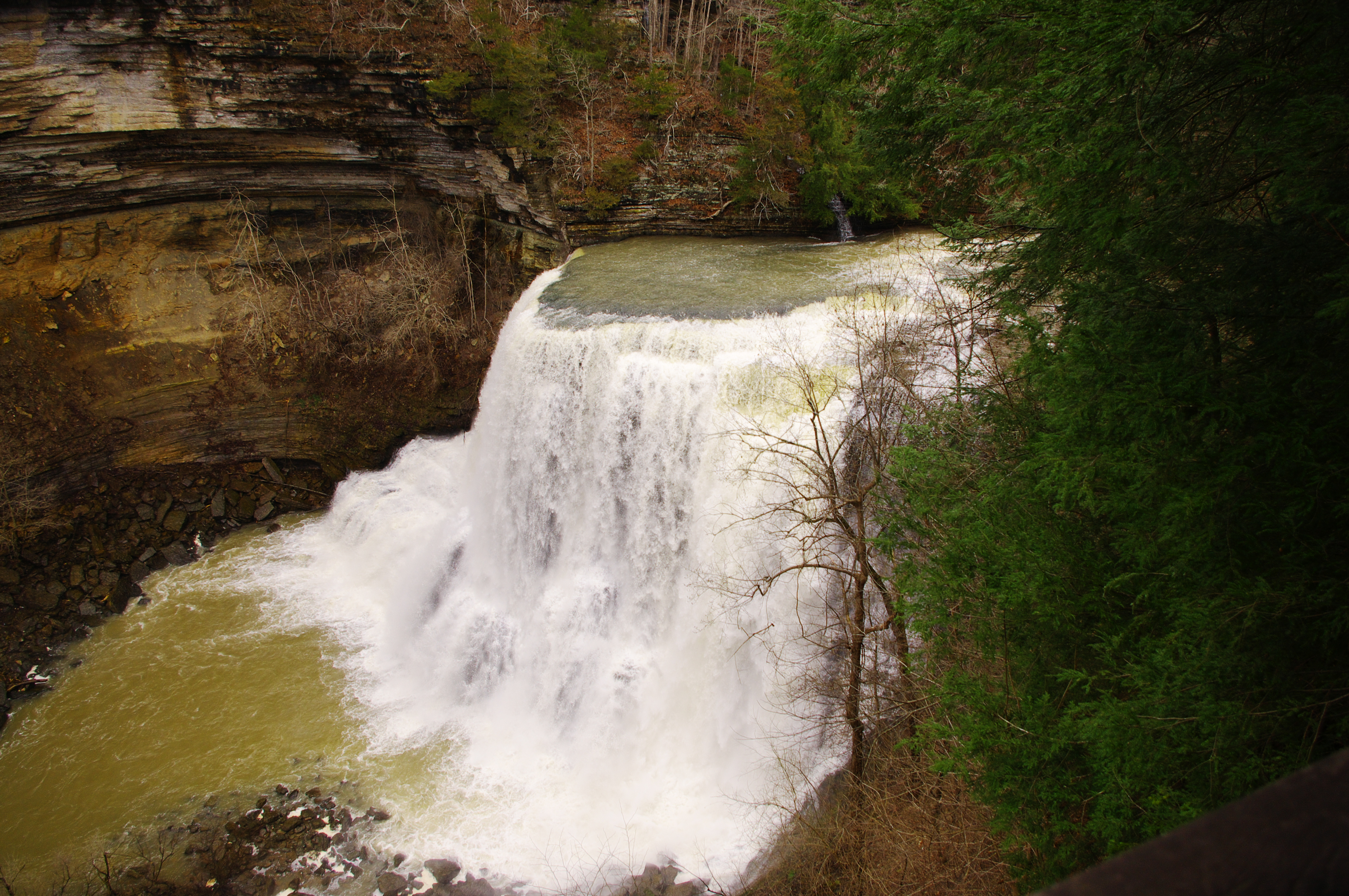
- Burgess Falls

- Location within Tennessee
- Location: Putnam and White counties, Tennessee, United States
- Coordinates: 36.04417°N 85.59418°W
- Type: Cascade
- Total height: 136 feet (41 m)
- Watercourse: Falling Water River

The Burgess Falls is a cascade waterfall on the Falling Water River located within the Burgess Falls State Park, in Putnam and White counties, Tennessee, in the United States. The waterfall spills approximately 136 feet (41 m) into a large limestone gorge enclosed by sheer 100–200-foot (30–61 m) walls. The Falling Water River enters Center Hill Lake downstream from Burgess Falls.

== See also ==
- List of waterfalls
