= Walling, Tennessee =

- Unincorporated community
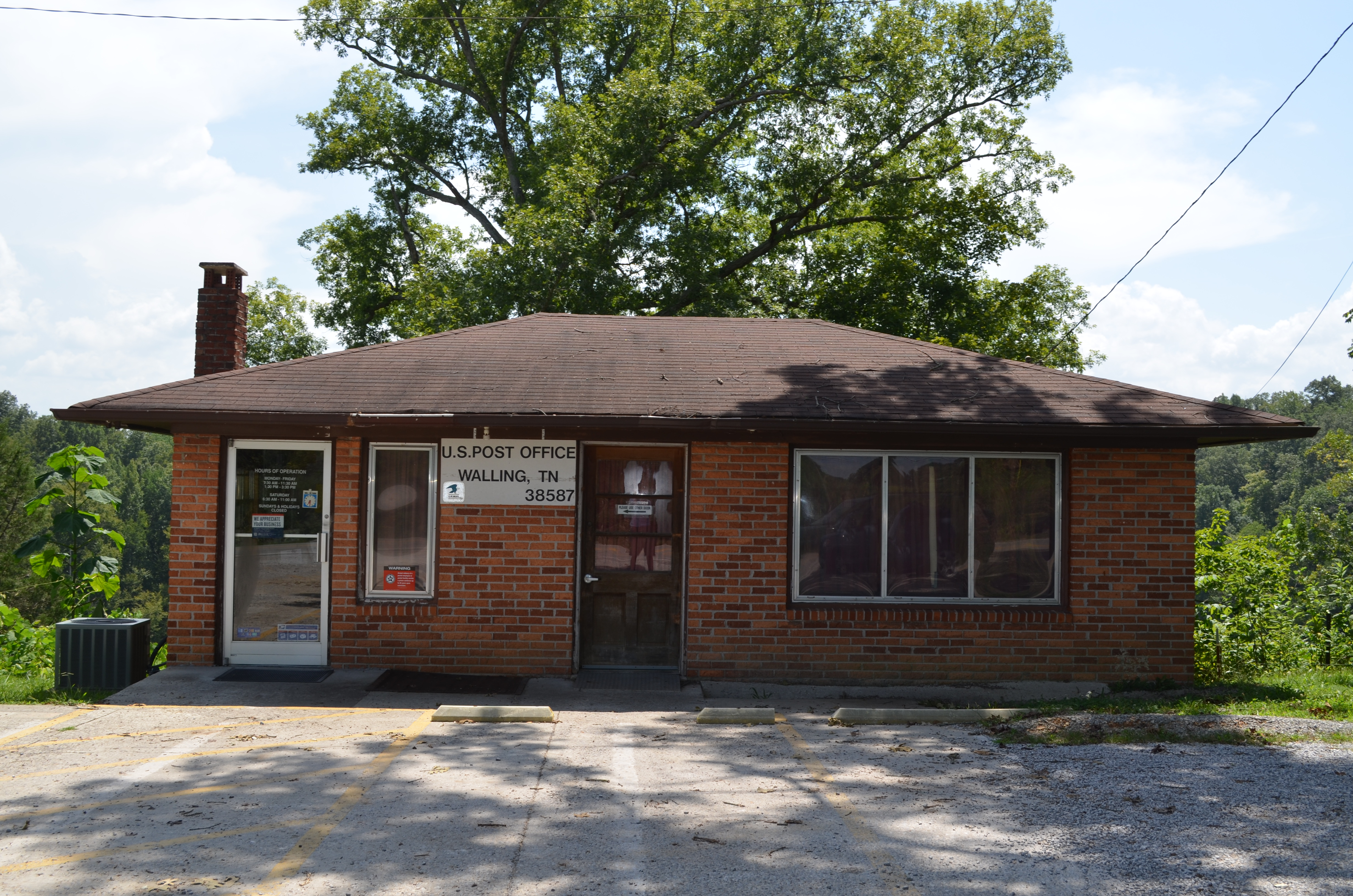
- Post office in Walling

- Location within Tennessee Location within the United States
- Coordinates: 35°48′29″N 85°35′58″W
- Country: United States
- State: Tennessee
- County: White
- Elevation: 892 ft (272 m)
- Time zone: UTC-6 (Central (CST))
  - Summer (DST): UTC-5 (CDT)
- ZIP code: 38587
- Area code: 931
- GNIS feature ID: 1304347

Walling is an unincorporated community in White County, Tennessee, United States. It lies along the Caney Fork southwest of Doyle, and east of Rock Island State Park. Tennessee State Route 136 passes through the community. Walling has a post office with ZIP code 38587.

The community is likely named for a family of early settlers.
