= Macedonia, Tennessee =

Unincorporated community in Tennessee, US

Macedonia (known as Milledgeville in the early 19th century) is an unincorporated community in White County, Tennessee, United States. Its elevation is 1,040 feet (317 m), and it is located at 36°2′8″N 85°31′53″W. Its name is derived from the ancient Greek Kingdom of Macedonia.
