= Darkey Springs, Tennessee =

Unincorporated community in Tennessee, US

Coordinates: 35.89673°N 85.58942°W

Darkey Springs is an unincorporated community in White County, Tennessee, in the United States.

== History ==
According to one source, the community was named on account of the slave market that it once contained in the 1820s.

A post office was established at Darkey Springs in 1871, and remained in operation until it was discontinued in 1904.
