= Burgess Falls State Park =

Protected area in Tennessee, US

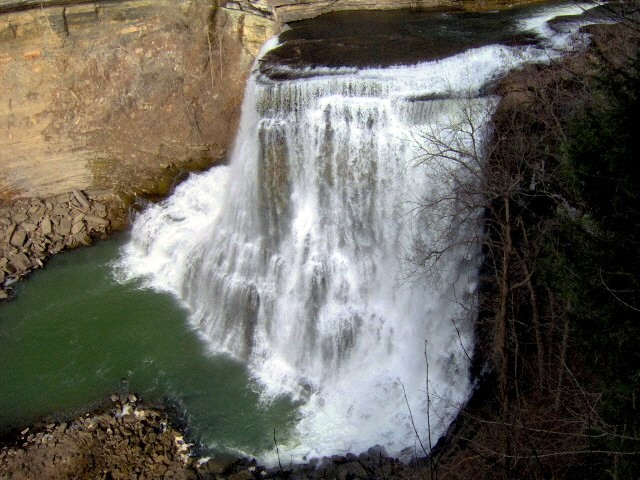
- Burgess Falls
- Interactive map of Burgess Falls State Park
- Type: State park
- Location: Sparta and Baxter, Tennessee, United States
- Coordinates: 36.04417°N 85.59418°W
- Area: 350 acres (1.4 km^{2})
- Created: 1971
- Operator: Tennessee Department of Environment and Conservation
- Website: Burgess Falls State Park

Burgess Falls State Park is a state park and state natural area in Putnam County and White County, Tennessee, located in the southeastern United States. The park is situated around a steep gorge in which the Falling Water River drops 250 feet (76 m) in elevation in less than a mile, culminating in a 136-foot (41 m) cataract waterfall.

The Burgess Falls State Natural Area, which covers 350 acres (1.4 km^{2}), is managed by the Tennessee Department of Environment and Conservation.

== Geography ==
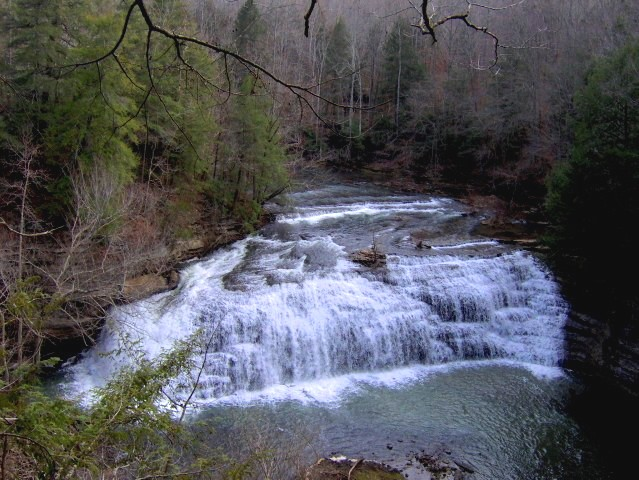
Middle Falls along the Falling Water River

The Falling Water River rises near the base of the Cumberland Plateau in eastern Putnam County and winds its way across the Highland Rim to its mouth along the Center Hill Lake impoundment of the Caney Fork, which is located in an area where the Highland Rim drops off into the Central Basin. The Burgess Falls State Natural Area comprises the section of the river just above its mouth, where the river drops from roughly 900 feet (270 m) atop the Highland Rim to just over 600 feet (180 m) at Center Hill Lake.

Over a long period of time, the Falling Water River's rapids have cut a deep gorge just above its mouth. The river drops to the Central Basin in a series of cascades and waterfalls, each gaining in size and intensity as the river approaches Center Hill Lake. At the Falling Water Cascades, located just downstream from the old Burgess Falls Dam, the river gradually spills over a 10-foot (3.0 m) embankment of rocks. Almost immediately downstream from the Cascades, the river drops another 30 feet (9.1 m) at Little Falls. Beyond Little Falls, where the river briefly bends to the north, is an 80-foot (24 m) cascade known as Middle Falls. Downstream from Middle Falls, where the river bends westward again, is the 136-foot (41 m) Burgess Falls. The distance between Falling Water Cascades and Burgess Falls is less than a mile. Burgess Falls spills into a large limestone gorge enclosed by sheer walls 100–200 feet (30–60 m) high. The Falling Water River enters Center Hill Lake downstream from Burgess Falls.

== History ==
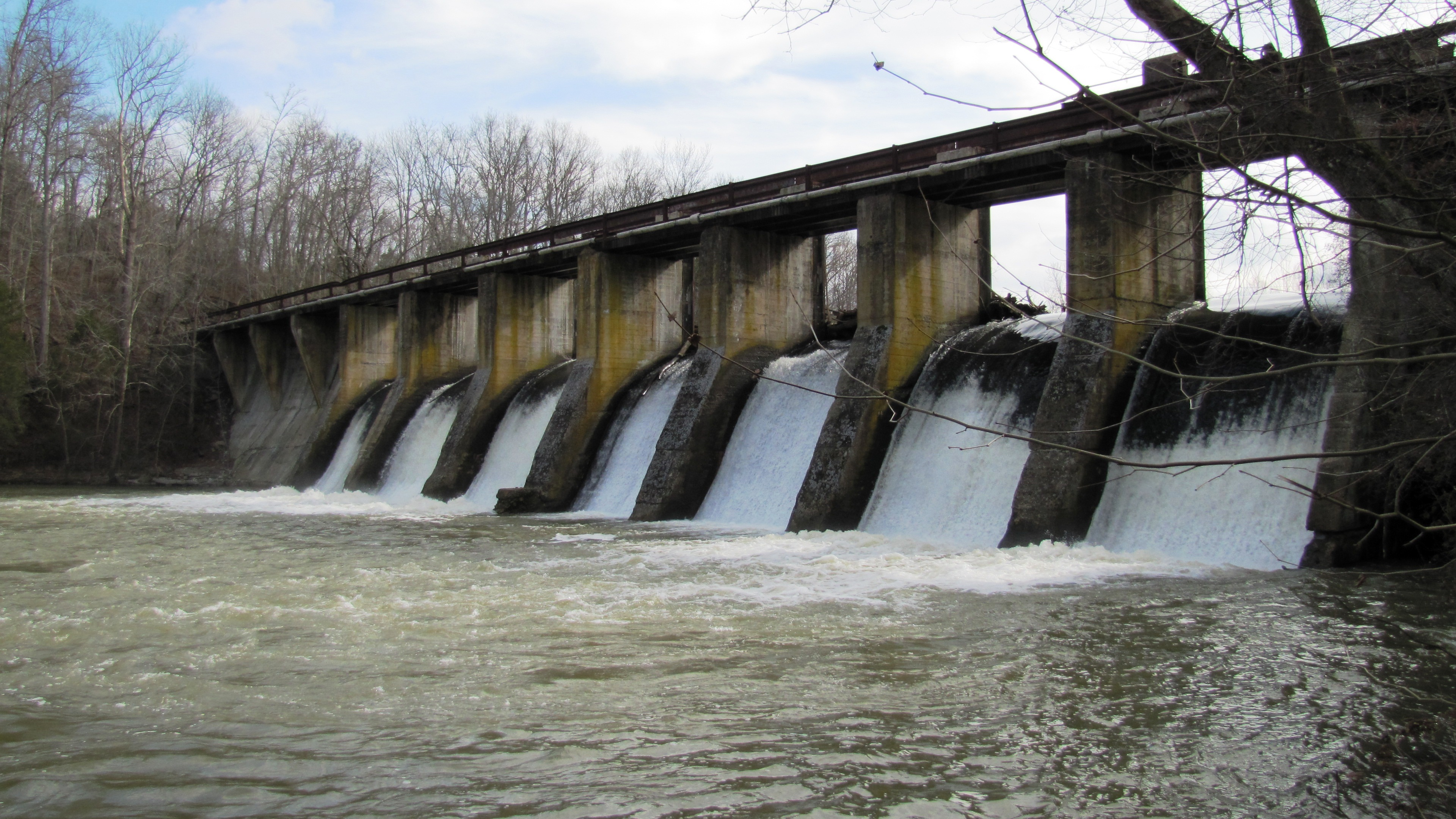
Burgess Falls Dam

Burgess Falls is named after Tom Burgess, a Revolutionary War veteran who settled along this section of the Falling Water River in the 1810s. The Burgess family used the river's rapids to power a grist mill and eventually a saw mill which supplied early settlers with corn meal and lumber.

In 1924, the City of Cookeville built an earthen dam along the river a mile or so upstream from Burgess Falls. After a flood destroyed the dam in 1928, the city replaced it with a concrete dam that provided the area with electricity until the arrival of the Tennessee Valley Authority in 1944. Due in large part to calls from Cookevillians to protect the area, Burgess Falls State Park was established in 1971. Part of a pipeline bridge still spans the river in the vicinity of Little Falls. The pipeline originally crossed the river into a tunnel on the north walls of the gorge and emerged to cross the river again near Middle Falls en route to a powerhouse.

== Access ==
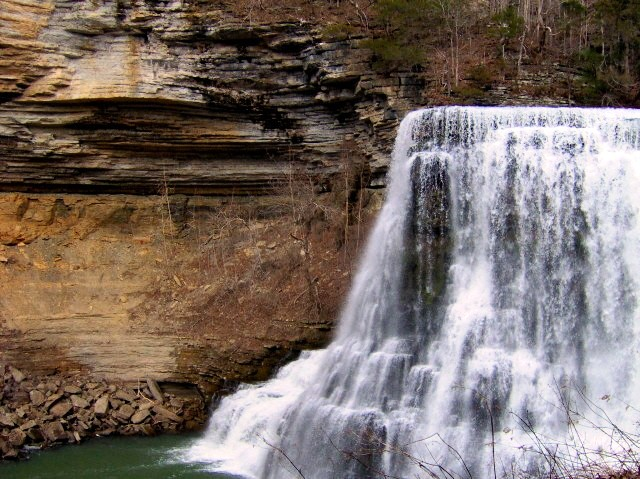
Profile view of Burgess Falls, showing the walls of the gorge

The entrance to Burgess Falls State Park is located just off Tennessee State Route 135 roughly halfway between Cookeville and Sparta. The park is open year-round, but is closed on days of high precipitation due to the Falling Water River's volatility.

A 1.5-mile (2.4 km) loop trail follows the bluffs along the south bank of the gorge, starting at Falling Water Cascades and ending at a platform overlooking Burgess Falls. Little Falls and Middle Falls are also visible from the trail. A stairway leads down to the top of Burgess Falls. The platforms which supported the flume are still visible and once supported stairs to access the bottom of the falls, however due to recent flooding the stairs have been removed. There is no access to the bottom of Burgess Falls from the main park. A second loop trail follows the ridgeline southwest of Burgess Falls.

The Burgess Falls State Natural Area includes Burgess Falls Lake and part of the forest on the both sides of the river in the lake's vicinity.

== See also ==
- Cummins Falls State Park
- Ozone Falls State Natural Area
