= White County, Tennessee =

County in Tennessee, United States

- County
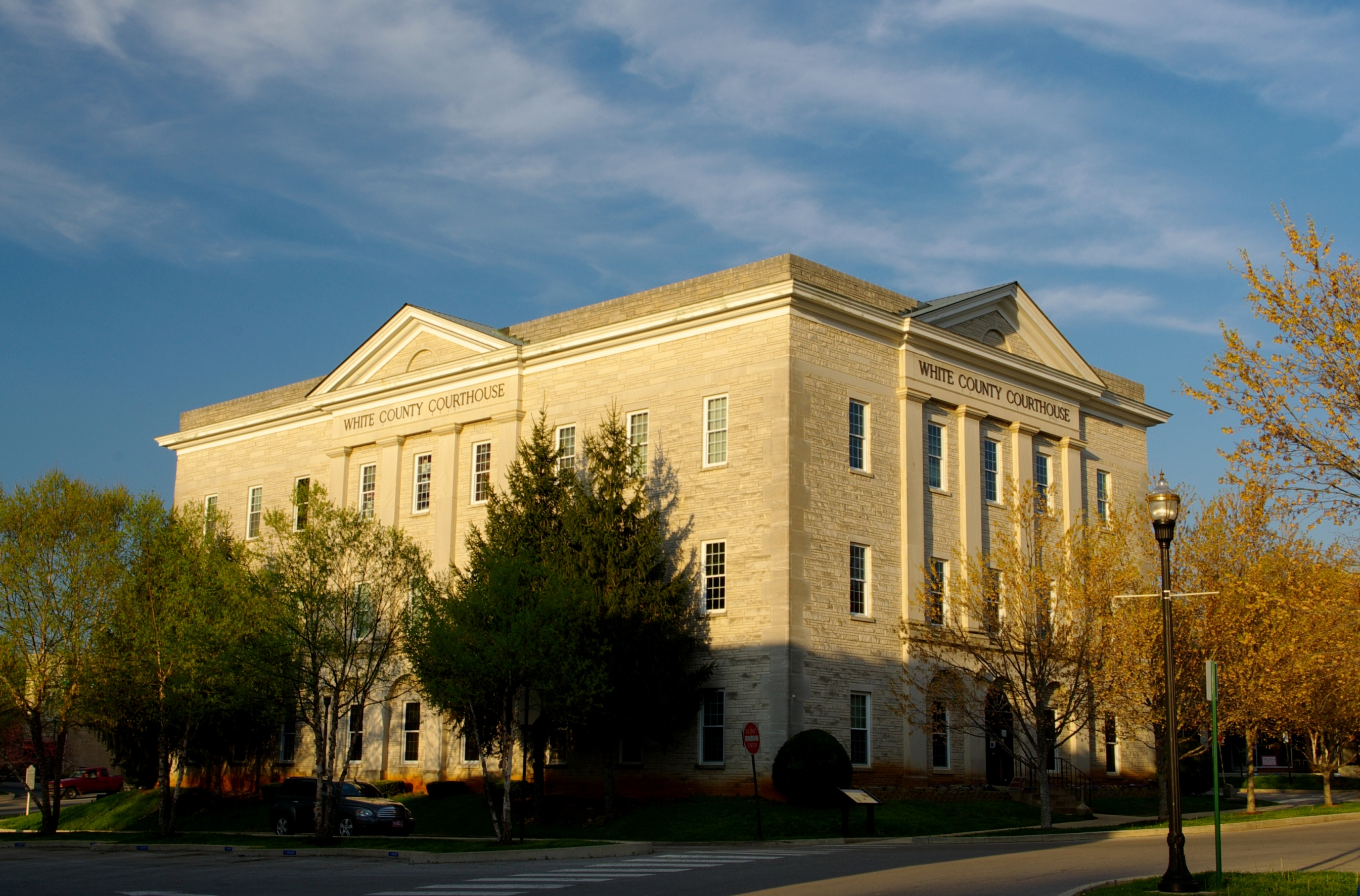
- White County Courthouse in Sparta

- Flag Logo

- Location within the U.S. state of Tennessee
- Coordinates: 35°56′N 85°27′W
- Country: United States
- State: Tennessee
- Founded: September 11, 1806
- Named for: John White, early settler
- Seat: Sparta
- Largest city: Sparta

Area
  - Total: 379 sq mi (980 km^{2})
  - Land: 377 sq mi (980 km^{2})
  - Water: 2.8 sq mi (7.3 km^{2}) 0.7%

Population (2020)
  - Total: 27,351
  - Estimate (2025): 29,612 ▲
  - Density: 72.5/sq mi (28.0/km^{2})
- Time zone: UTC−6 (Central)
  - Summer (DST): UTC−5 (CDT)
- ZIP Codes: 38583
- Congressional district: 6th
- Website: whitecountytn.gov

White County is a county located in the U.S. state of Tennessee. As of the 2020 census, the population was 27,351. Its county seat is Sparta. White County is in the Cookeville Micropolitan Statistical Area.

== History ==
On September 11, 1806, an act of the Tennessee General Assembly created White County out of Smith and Jackson counties, responding to a petition signed by 155 residents of the area. The county's original geographic area included all of what are now White and Warren counties, as well as parts of modern Cannon, Coffee, DeKalb, Franklin, Grundy, Putnam, and Van Buren counties.

The origin of the county's name is disputed. The county is officially held to be named for John White (1751–1846), a Revolutionary War soldier, surveyor, and frontiersman who was the first known white settler of the area. White had moved his family to the Cumberland Mountains from Virginia in 1789. However, some historians suggest the county was named for Revolutionary War soldier James White, the founder of Knoxville.

A temporary county seat was established near Rock Island, now in Warren County. Three years later a permanent county seat was established on the banks of the Calfkiller River and named Sparta.

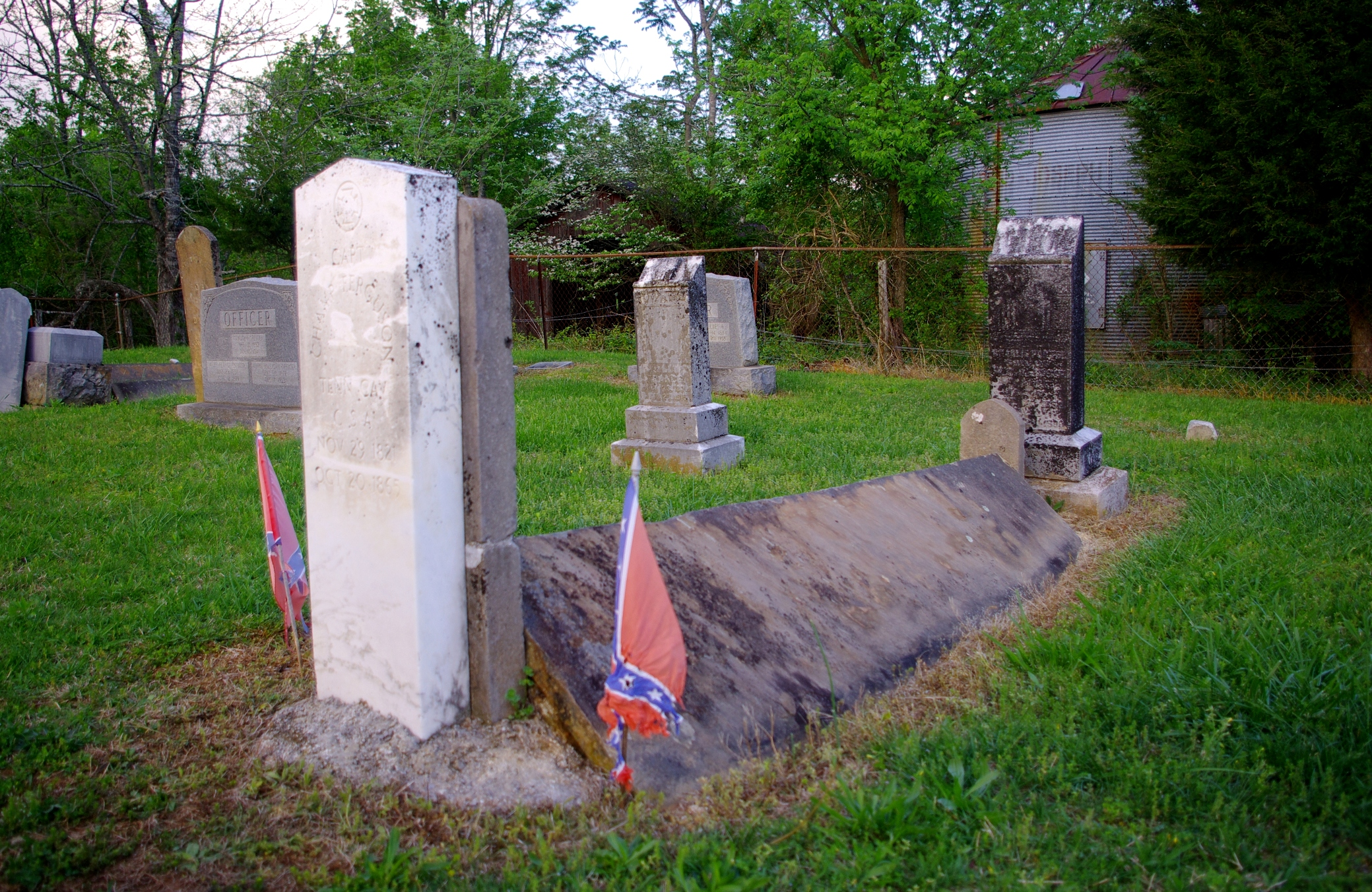
Grave of Confederate bushwhacker Champ Ferguson near Sparta

In 1840, White County became a destination for people from all over the country when Christopher Haufmann erected a large hotel on Bon Air Mountain, part of the Cumberland Plateau. The hotel was near some mineral springs as well as being at a high altitude; both were thought to promote health, and people came from far and wide for the "cures" advertised by the resort.

White County was the site of a very large saltpeter mining operation during the Civil War. The Cave Hill Saltpeter Pits (No. 1 and No. 2), located on Cave Hill near the mouth of England Cove, were intensively mined. Relics remain from that operation. Saltpeter is the main ingredient of gunpowder and was obtained by leaching the earth from these caves.

The Civil War deeply affected White County, although no major battles were fought in the area. As it was on the border between the largely pro-Union East Tennessee and pro-Confederate Middle Tennessee, the county was the scene of bloodshed from partisans (called "bushwhackers") of both sides. One famous Confederate guerrilla operating in the area was Champ Ferguson, who caused much mayhem and destruction before he was arrested after the war on May 28, 1865. Ferguson was tried by a military court, convicted and executed by hanging, one of only two Confederates executed for war crimes. He is buried in France Cemetery near Sparta.

Over the subsequent decades, White County slowly rebuilt from the ashes of war. The county was connected to the outside world by railroad, mainly because of the booming coal mining industries being started on Bon Air Mountain. The mountain was rich in bituminous coal, and enterprising local businessmen were quick to realize the profit potential that represented. Several mining towns sprang up on the plateau part of the county, including Bon Air, Eastland, and Ravenscroft.

In 1981, a dispute between a local mining company and residents escalated and later became a Tennessee Supreme Court case known as Doochin v. Rackley. The disagreement began when the local coal companies began to strip mine residents' private land. The court ruled in favor of the defendants because the Broad Form Deed did not recognize strip mining as a legal form of mining.

== Geography ==
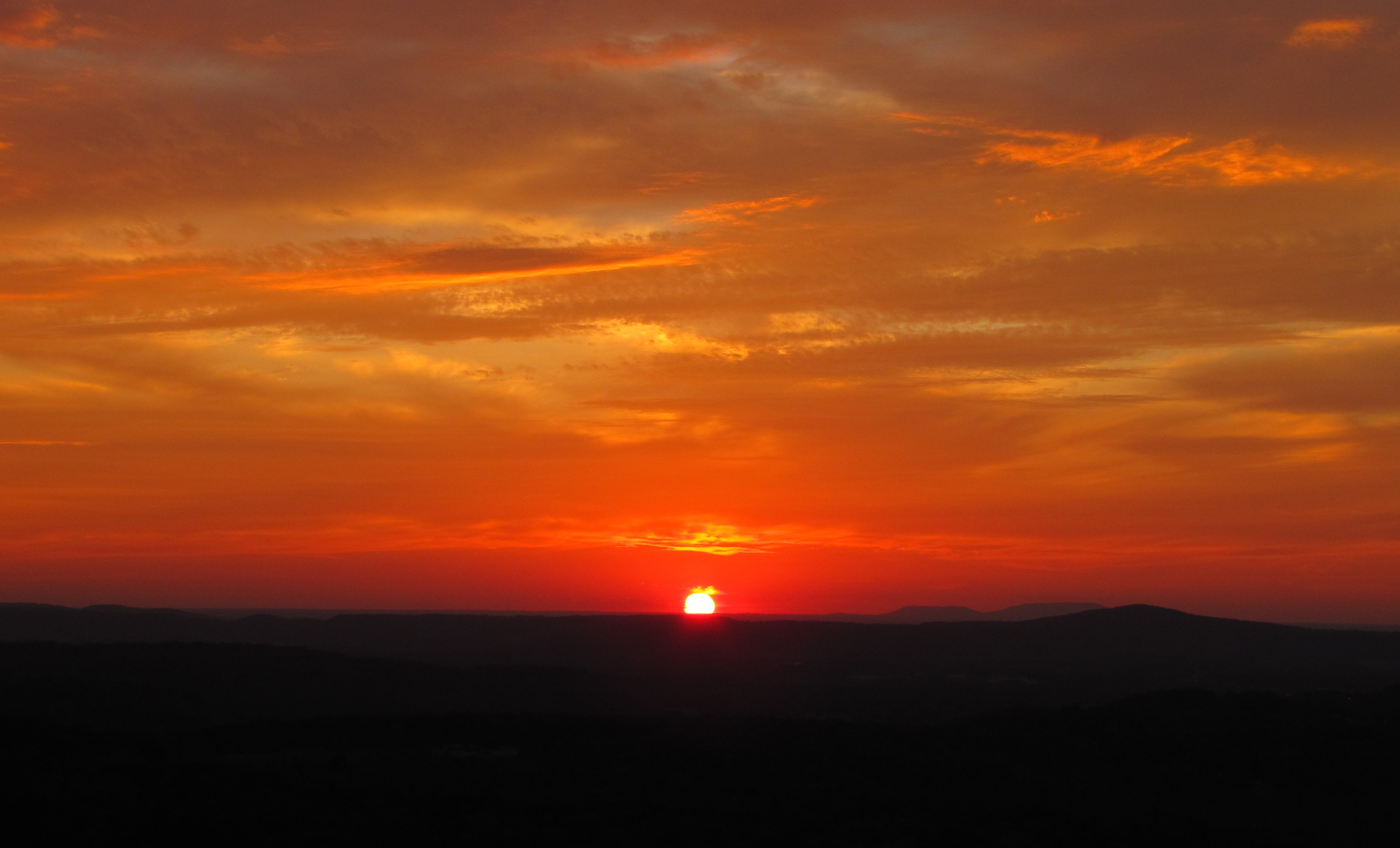
Sunset over White County, viewed from US-70 at the edge of the Cumberland Plateau

According to the U.S. Census Bureau, the county has a total area of 379 square miles (980 km^{2}), of which 377 square miles (980 km^{2}) is land and 2.8 square miles (7.3 km^{2}) (0.7%) is water. The eastern part of the county lies atop the Cumberland Plateau, while the western portion is situated on the Highland Rim, at a lower elevation. The Plateau Escarpment is visible from much of the western part of the county.

The Caney Fork, the county's primary drainage, flows across the southern portion of the county, and forms part the county's border with Van Buren, Warren and DeKalb. The river descends from the Cumberland Plateau to the Highland Rim through Scott's Gulf, a dramatic gorge noted for scenic waterfalls, most notably the 110-foot (34 m) Virgin Falls. The section of the Caney Fork in southern White County is part of Great Falls Lake, an artificial reservoir created by Great Falls Dam at Rock Island State Park. Downstream from this dam, the river enters a second reservoir, Center Hill Lake.

The Calfkiller River, a tributary of the Caney Fork, flows through the central part of White County, and drains the county seat, Sparta. The Falling Water River, also a tributary of the Caney Fork, flows through the northwestern part of the county, and forms part of the county's border with Putnam County. The Falling Water River is noted for its 136-foot (41 m) waterfall, Burgess Falls, which straddles the Putnam-White line.

White County also boasts over 1,200 documented caves (over 3.17 caves per square mile), which makes White County one of the most cave-dense regions in the world.

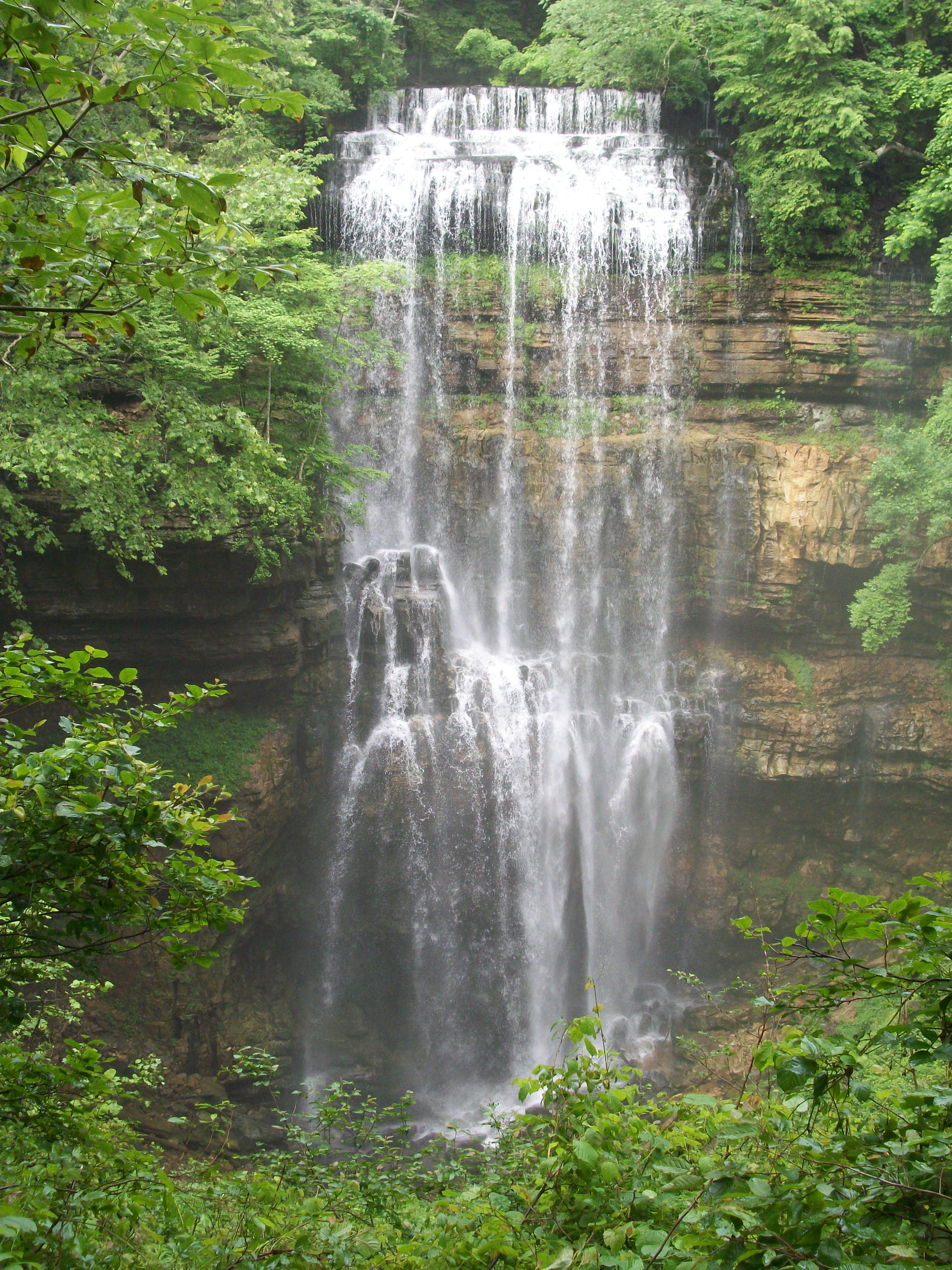
Virgin Falls

=== Adjacent counties ===
The following counties are adjacent to White.

- Putnam County (north)
- Cumberland County (east)
- Van Buren County (south)
- Warren County (southwest)
- DeKalb County (west)

=== Blue Spring Cave ===
Blue Spring Cave, located five miles northeast of Sparta, is the longest mapped cave in Tennessee and the tenth longest cave in the United States, with 38 miles (61 km) of passages. The footprints of extinct Pleistocene (Ice Age) jaguars were discovered in the cave in 1990 by Bill Walter.

=== Major highways ===
- US 70
- US 70S
- SR 1
- SR 84
- SR 111
- SR 135
- SR 136
- SR 285
- SR 289

=== State protected areas ===
- Bledsoe State Forest (part)
- Bridgestone/Firestone Centennial Wilderness Wildlife Management Area (part)
- Burgess Falls State Park and Natural Area (part)
- Rock Island State Park (part)
- Sparta Rock House State Historic Site
- Virgin Falls State Natural Area

== Demographics ==
Historical population
Census	Pop.	Note	%±
1810	4,028		—
1820	8,701		116.0%
1830	9,967		14.6%
1840	10,747		7.8%
1850	11,444		6.5%
1860	9,381		−18.0%
1870	9,375		−0.1%
1880	11,176		19.2%
1890	12,348		10.5%
1900	14,157		14.7%
1910	15,420		8.9%
1920	15,701		1.8%
1930	15,543		−1.0%
1940	15,983		2.8%
1950	16,204		1.4%
1960	15,577		−3.9%
1970	17,088		9.7%
1980	19,567		14.5%
1990	20,090		2.7%
2000	23,102		15.0%
2010	25,841		11.9%
2020	27,351		5.8%
2025 (est.)	29,612	▲	8.3%
U.S. Decennial Census; 1790-1960 1900-1990; 1990-2000 2010-2014

=== Racial and ethnic composition ===
White County, Tennessee – Racial and ethnic composition Note: the US Census treats Hispanic/Latino as an ethnic category. This table excludes Latinos from the racial categories and assigns them to a separate category. Hispanics/Latinos may be of any race.
Race / Ethnicity (NH = Non-Hispanic)	Pop 1980	Pop 1990	Pop 2000	Pop 2010	Pop 2020	% 1980	% 1990	% 2000	% 2010	% 2020
White alone (NH)	18,982	19,587	22,196	24,496	24,833	97.01%	97.50%	96.08%	94.80%	90.79%
Black or African American alone (NH)	430	378	377	450	405	2.20%	1.88%	1.63%	1.74%	1.48%
Native American or Alaska Native alone (NH)	9	24	45	66	75	0.05%	0.12%	0.19%	0.26%	0.27%
Asian alone (NH)	20	25	52	69	132	0.10%	0.12%	0.23%	0.27%	0.48%
Native Hawaiian or Pacific Islander alone (NH)	x	x	12	20	10	x	x	0.05%	0.08%	0.04%
Other race alone (NH)	1	2	16	9	56	0.01%	0.01%	0.07%	0.03%	0.20%
Mixed race or Multiracial (NH)	x	x	165	306	1,104	x	x	0.71%	1.18%	4.04%
Hispanic or Latino (any race)	125	74	239	425	736	0.64%	0.37%	1.03%	1.64%	2.69%
Total	19,567	20,090	23,102	25,841	27,351	100.00%	100.00%	100.00%	100.00%	100.00%

=== 2020 census ===
As of the 2020 census, the county had a population of 27,351 and the median age was 43.8 years; 21.9% of residents were under the age of 18 and 21.3% were 65 years of age or older, with 97.4 males for every 100 females and 95.3 males for every 100 females age 18 and over.

The racial makeup of the county was 91.5% White, 1.5% Black or African American, 0.3% American Indian and Alaska Native, 0.5% Asian, <0.1% Native Hawaiian and Pacific Islander, 0.8% from some other race, and 5.3% from two or more races. Hispanic or Latino residents of any race comprised 2.7% of the population.

20.8% of residents lived in urban areas, while 79.2% lived in rural areas.

There were 10,865 households in the county, of which 29.4% had children under the age of 18 living in them. Of all households, 50.4% were married-couple households, 18.1% were households with a male householder and no spouse or partner present, and 25.1% were households with a female householder and no spouse or partner present. About 26.1% of all households were made up of individuals and 13.7% had someone living alone who was 65 years of age or older.

There were 11,938 housing units, of which 9.0% were vacant. Among occupied housing units, 76.7% were owner-occupied and 23.3% were renter-occupied. The homeowner vacancy rate was 1.8% and the rental vacancy rate was 5.9%.

=== 2000 census ===
As of the census of 2000, there were 23,102 people, 9,229 households, and 6,774 families residing in the county. The population density was 61 people per square mile (24 people/km^{2}). There were 10,191 housing units at an average density of 27 units per square mile (10/km^{2}). The racial makeup of the county was 96.63% White, 1.64% Black or African American, 0.20% Native American, 0.23% Asian, 0.05% Pacific Islander, 0.46% from other races, and 0.79% from two or more races. 1.03% of the population were Hispanic or Latino of any race.

There were 9,229 households, out of which 30.40% had children under the age of 18 living with them, 58.50% were married couples living together, 10.80% had a female householder with no husband present, and 26.60% were non-families. 23.40% of all households were made up of individuals, and 10.80% had someone living alone who was 65 years of age or older. The average household size was 2.47 and the average family size was 2.90.

In the county, the population was spread out, with 23.50% under the age of 18, 7.90% from 18 to 24, 27.90% from 25 to 44, 25.40% from 45 to 64, and 15.30% who were 65 years of age or older. The median age was 39 years. For every 100 females there were 96.20 males. For every 100 females age 18 and over, there were 92.40 males.

The median income for a household in the county was $29,383, and the median income for a family was $34,854. Males had a median income of $26,706 versus $20,346 for females. The per capita income for the county was $14,791. About 11.20% of families and 14.30% of the population were below the poverty line, including 16.90% of those under age 18 and 13.90% of those age 65 or over.

== Education ==
=== Public schools ===
- White County High School
- White County Middle School
- BonDeCroft Elementary School
- Cassville Elementary School
- Central View Elementary School
- Doyle Elementary School
- Findlay Elementary School
- Northfield Elementary School
- Woodland Park Elementary School

== Communities ==
=== City ===
- Sparta

=== Town ===
- Doyle

=== Unincorporated communities ===
- Bon Air
- Darkey Springs
- DeRossett
- Macedonia
- Quebeck
- Ravenscroft
- Shady Grove
- Walling
- Yankeetown

== Notable people ==
- David Culley - National Football League head coach
- George Gibbs Dibrell – U.S. Congressman and Confederate general
- Champ Ferguson – Confederate guerrilla
- Lester Flatt – bluegrass guitarist and mandolinist, best known for his collaboration with banjo picker Earl Scruggs in "The Foggy Mountain Boys"
- Kellie Harper – women's basketball head coach at the University of Tennessee Lady Vols - formerly (North Carolina State and Missouri State University) and a graduate of White County High School
- Benny Martin – bluegrass musician; invented the eight-string fiddle
- Carl Rowan – journalist, author, U.S. Ambassador to Finland
- Pauline Weaver – Arizona mountain man, born in White County
- Earl Webb – Major League Baseball record holder for most doubles in a season

== Politics ==
United States presidential election results for White County, Tennessee
Year	Republican		Democratic		Third party(ies)	
Year	No.	%	No.	%	No.	%
1912	330	17.48%	1,222	64.72%	336	17.80%
1916	587	28.94%	1,407	69.38%	34	1.68%
1920	1,456	39.81%	2,201	60.19%	0	0.00%
1924	452	27.29%	1,162	70.17%	42	2.54%
1928	776	43.26%	1,018	56.74%	0	0.00%
1932	390	16.66%	1,938	82.79%	13	0.56%
1936	591	41.80%	814	57.57%	9	0.64%
1940	657	22.44%	2,256	77.05%	15	0.51%
1944	668	33.22%	1,339	66.58%	4	0.20%
1948	635	23.68%	1,719	64.09%	328	12.23%
1952	1,374	37.00%	2,319	62.44%	21	0.57%
1956	1,346	35.81%	2,378	63.26%	35	0.93%
1960	1,725	43.15%	2,207	55.20%	66	1.65%
1964	1,199	28.64%	2,987	71.36%	0	0.00%
1968	1,423	29.91%	1,584	33.30%	1,750	36.79%
1972	2,252	60.42%	1,392	37.35%	83	2.23%
1976	1,382	26.01%	3,874	72.90%	58	1.09%
1980	2,100	37.41%	3,415	60.84%	98	1.75%
1984	2,895	48.59%	3,033	50.91%	30	0.50%
1988	2,646	50.41%	2,562	48.81%	41	0.78%
1992	2,118	29.94%	4,102	57.99%	854	12.07%
1996	2,498	37.65%	3,592	54.14%	545	8.21%
2000	3,525	45.34%	4,135	53.18%	115	1.48%
2004	5,269	55.49%	4,147	43.68%	79	0.83%
2008	6,103	63.26%	3,372	34.95%	172	1.78%
2012	6,197	67.80%	2,795	30.58%	148	1.62%
2016	7,671	78.08%	1,845	18.78%	309	3.15%
2020	9,606	80.76%	2,143	18.02%	146	1.23%
2024	10,717	82.88%	2,105	16.28%	109	0.84%

== See also ==
- National Register of Historic Places listings in White County, Tennessee
