= Falling Water River =

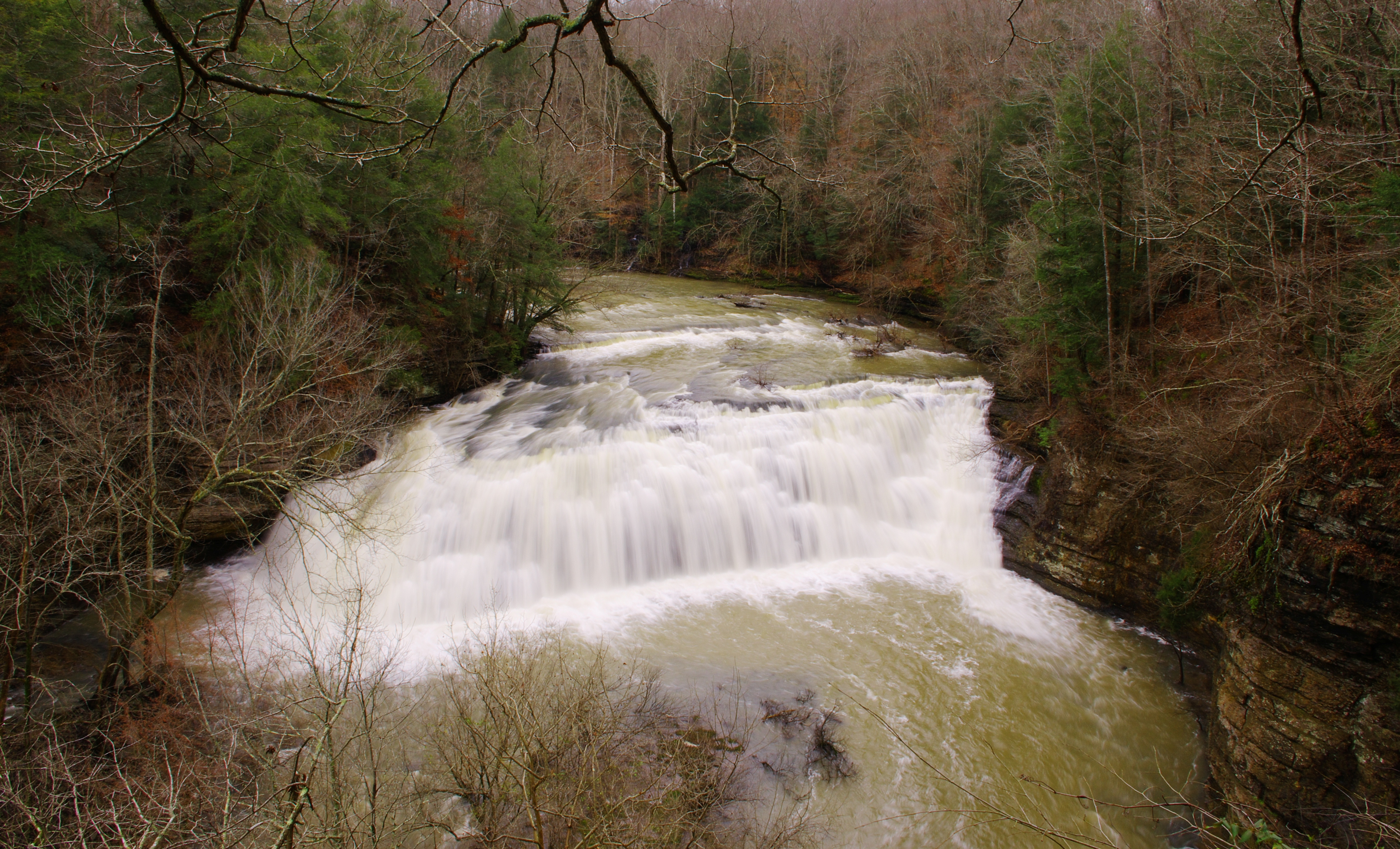

Location
- Country: United States
- State: Tennessee

Physical characteristics
- Source: Welch Hollow near Monterey
  - coordinates: 36°08′48″N 85°16′45″W
  - elevation: 1,640 ft (500 m)
- Mouth: Center Hill Lake (Caney Fork) northeast of Smithville
  - coordinates: 36°01′01″N 85°41′31″W
  - elevation: 646 ft (197 m)
- Length: 46.8 mi (75.3 km)
- Discharge
  - location: Cookeville
  - average: 122 cu ft/s (3.5 m^{3}/s)

The Falling Water River is a 46.8-mile-long (75.3 km) stream in the east-central portion of Middle Tennessee in the United States. It rises just west of Monterey at the edge of the Cumberland Plateau, and traverses the Eastern Highland Rim before dropping off to the Nashville Basin and emptying into Center Hill Lake along the Caney Fork. The river is noted for the 136-foot (41 m) Burgess Falls, which it spills over near the end of its course.

== Course ==
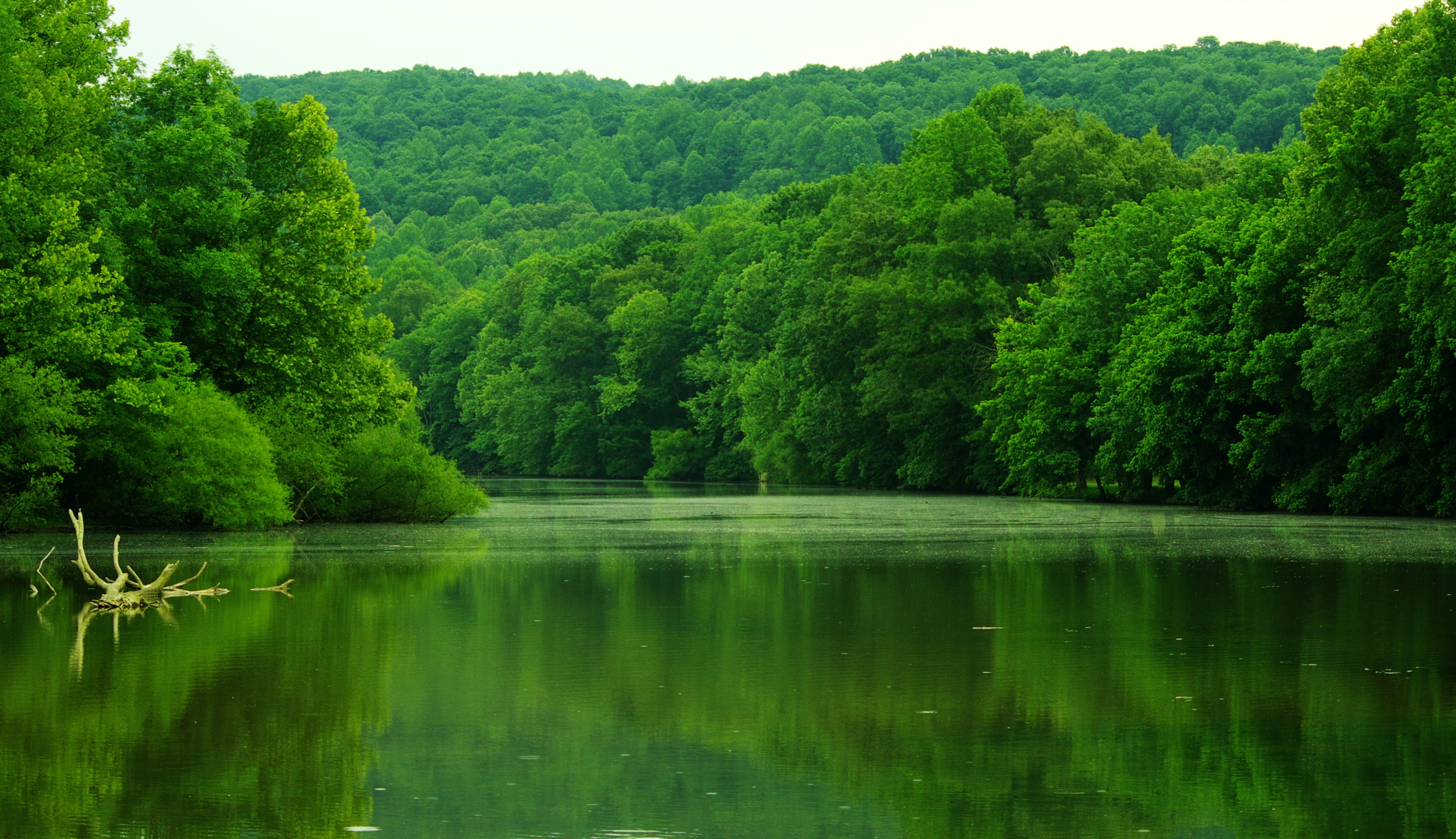
City Lake

The river rises in Welch Hollow, a dissected portion of the Cumberland Plateau that lies just west of Monterey in eastern Putnam County, and descends more than 600 feet (180 m) before exiting the hollow at the southern edge of Buck Mountain. It passes under Interstate 40 near mile marker 291 before entering City Lake, a reservoir that provides water and water treatment for nearby Cookeville. Just beyond the City Lake Dam, the river passes under U.S. Highway 70N as it turns southwestwardly through rural southern Putnam County.

After flowing through a series of sharp bends, the river passes under Tennessee State Route 111 before entering northern White County, winding its way through a rural area to the north and west of the Upper Cumberland Regional Airport. The river again reaches (and forms) the Putnam-White county line before entering Burgess Falls Lake, a reservoir built in the early 1920s to provide electricity for Cookeville. The river passes under State Highway 135 just upstream from the reservoir's dam. Beyond the dam, the river enters a gorge and flows over a series of three waterfalls, culminating in the 136-foot (41 m) Burgess Falls, as it drops from the Highland Rim to the Nashville Basin.

At the base of Burgess Falls, the river enters Center Hill Lake, an impoundment of the Caney Fork created by the U.S. Army Corps of Engineers' Center Hill Dam. The river passes a point where the counties of Putnam, White, and DeKalb intersect, and continues southwestward into DeKalb. It empties into the Caney Fork at just over 15 river miles above Center Hill Dam, and just above river mile 53.

== Watershed ==
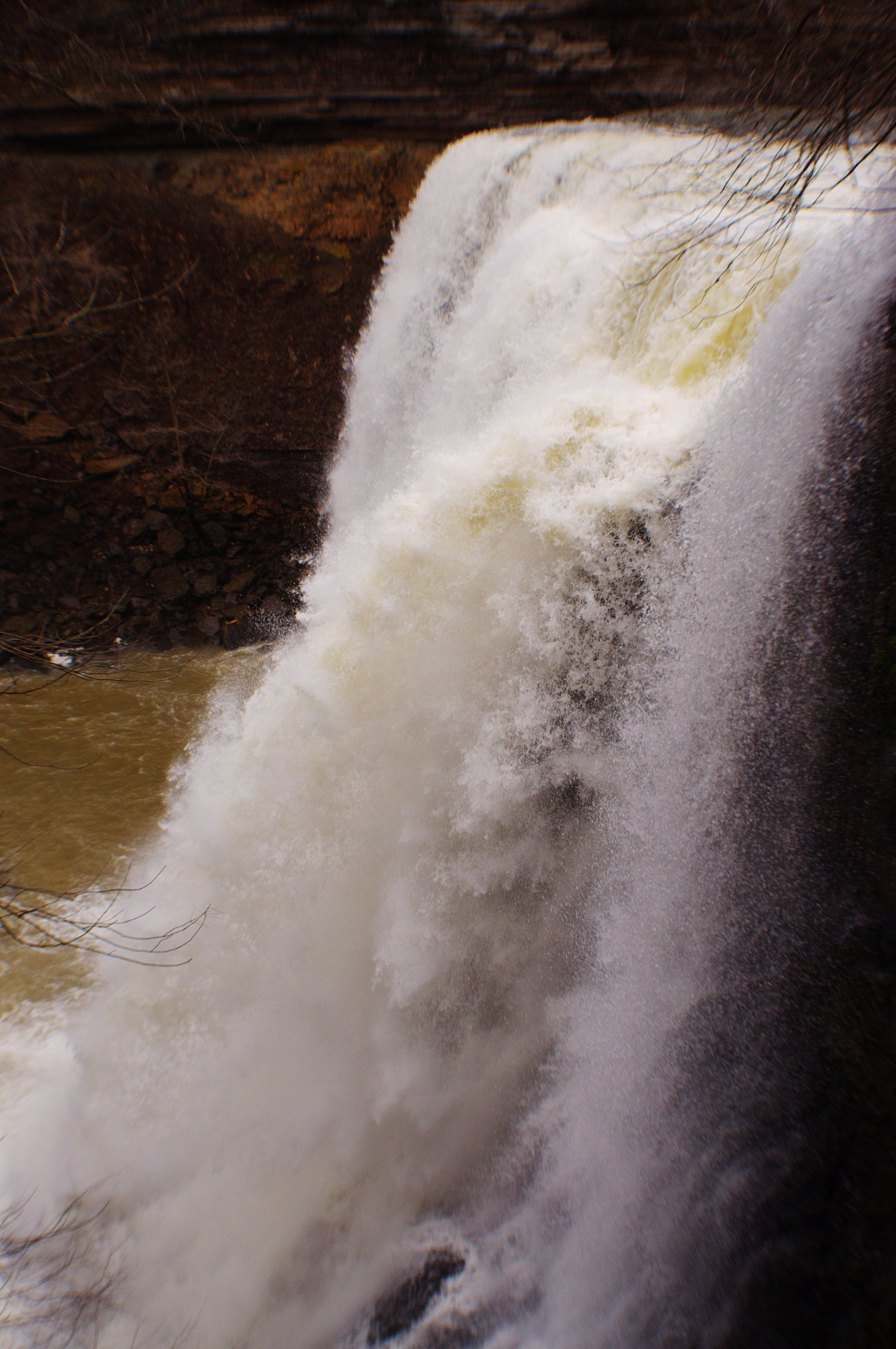
Burgess Falls

The Falling Water River has a drainage area of 191 square miles (490 km^{2}), and is part of the Caney Fork, Cumberland, Ohio, and Mississippi watersheds. Tributaries of the Falling Water River include Cleghorn Creek, which empties into City Lake, Pigeon Roost Creek (near the Putnam-White county line), Glade Creek, which empties into Burgess Falls Lake, Cane Creek, which joins the river downstream from Burgess Falls, and Taylor Creek and Dry Creek, which are part of the Center Hill Lake backwaters.

== Geology ==
The river flows primarily across the Eastern Highland Rim, a region of rolling terrain underlain by limestone strata and dissected by deep erosional valleys. Downstream from Burgess Falls Dam, the river enters a gorge underlain by siliceous Mississippian limestone that contains nodules of mineral quartz, making it resistant to erosion, allowing the development of the gorge's three waterfalls. At Burgess Falls, the river spills from an overhang of the resistant Mississippian rock to a plungepool underlain by older Ordovician rock. A belt of Devonian period shale divides the Mississippian and Ordovician formations.

Window Cliff, a formation that includes several natural arches overlooking a waterfall, lies along a bend of Cane Creek just upstream from its confluence with the Falling Water River. Fancher Falls, an 80-foot (24 m) waterfall, is located along Taylor Creek, near its confluence with the Falling Water River.

== History ==
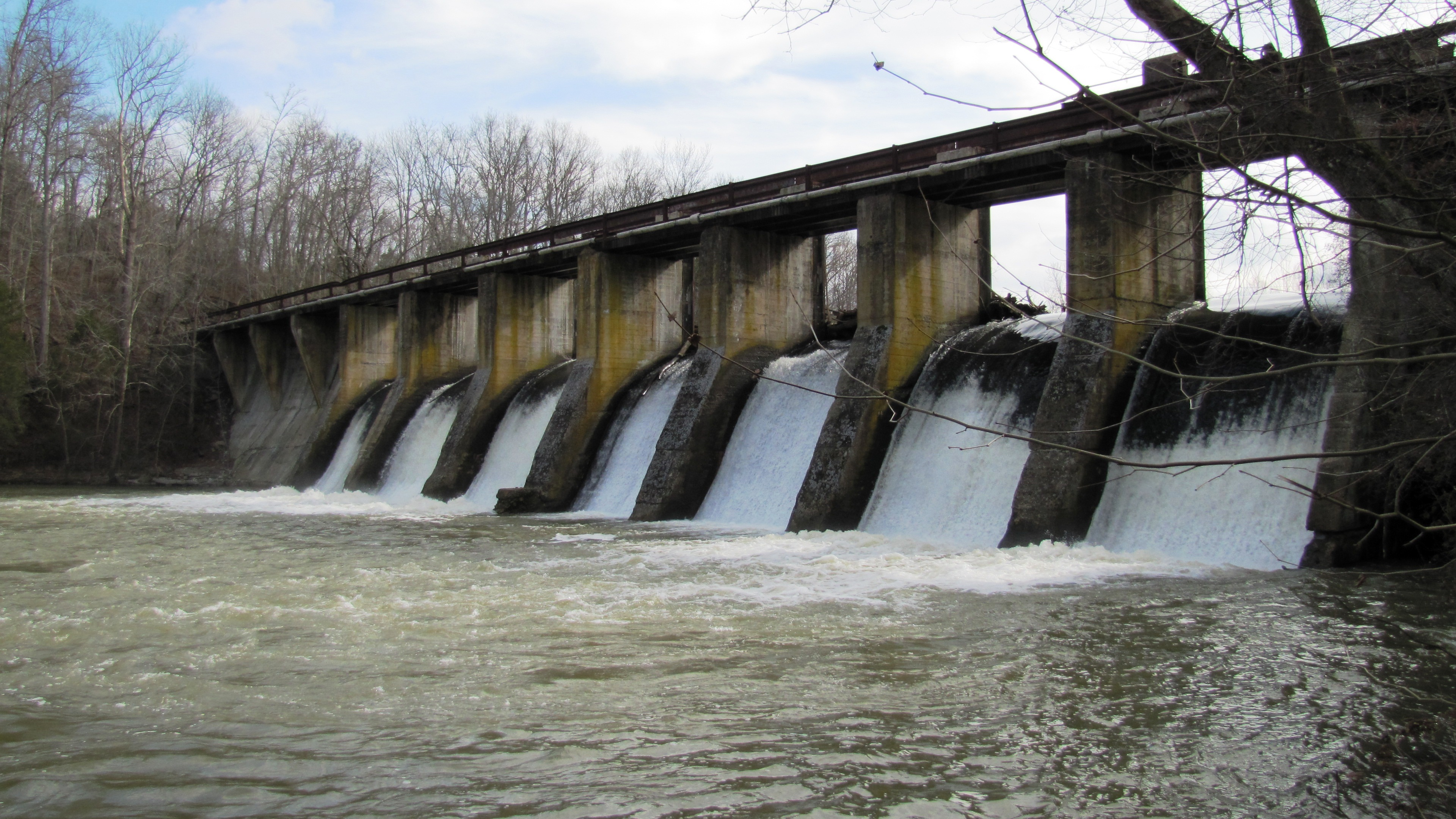
Burgess Falls Dam

The Falling Water River was harnessed to power gristmills during the 19th century. In 1921, the City of Cookeville began building Burgess Falls Dam to supply the city with electrical power. In late June 1928, a massive flood along the river caused part of the dam to collapse, and destroyed the powerhouse downstream. The dam was rebuilt, and continued supplying the city with electricity until 1944, when the city started purchasing electricity from the Tennessee Valley Authority. Cookeville built the City Lake Dam in 1946 to provide the city with a steady source of water. Center Hill Dam was completed by the U.S. Army Corps of Engineers in 1948.

== Recreation ==
Burgess Falls State Park and a 350-acre (140 ha) state natural area protect the areas around Burgess Falls and Burgess Falls Lake. Burgess Falls Dam is listed on the National Register of Historic Places. The Cookeville Dock, located off State Highway 135, and the Corps of Engineers's Johnson Chapel Recreation Area, located off Sparta Highway (Highway 70), provide access to the Center Hill Lake section of the river. A primitive camp ground known as Cane Hollow is located off Highway 135, downstream from Burgess Falls.

The City of Cookeville maintains a 35-acre (14 ha) park along City Lake just off Bridgeway Drive. The park includes a boat ramp.

== See also ==
- Calfkiller River
- List of rivers of Tennessee
