= McMinnville and Manchester Railroad =

Overview
- Locale: Tennessee
- Dates of operation: 1856–1877
- Successor: Nashville, Chattanooga and St. Louis Railway Company; Louisville and Nashville Railroad Company; Seaboard System Railroad Company

Technical
- Track gauge: 5 ft (1,524 mm)

The McMinnville and Manchester Railroad Company was chartered by an Act of the legislature of the State of Tennessee on February 4, 1850. Under this charter, the railroad company built a line of railroad from McMinnville, Tennessee. southwesterly through Manchester, Tennessee. to Tullahoma, Tennessee, where it connected with the railroad line of the Nashville and Chattanooga Railroad Company.

The McMinnville and Manchester company opened 34.2 miles (55.0 km) of 5 ft (1,524 mm) gauge railroad between McMinnville and Tullahoma in November 1856. In the absence of any contract with the original owner that differed with the franchises granted by law, the railroad was entitled to a right-of-way extended 100 feet (30.5 m) on either side of the center of the railroad line.

== American Civil War ==
The McMinnville and Manchester Railroad line was leased to and operated by the Nashville and Chattanooga Railroad for five years from January 1, 1857. During the American Civil War, in early 1862, the railroad came under Union Army control. In August 1862, the area through which the line was located came under Confederate States Army control for almost a year before it was reoccupied by Union forces.

Because of its strategic location in southeastern Tennessee, about 55 miles (89 km) north of Chattanooga, Tennessee, and its connection with the important Nashville and Chattanooga Railroad, the McMinnville and Manchester line and equipment was fought over, used and damaged by both Union and Confederate armies.

In late August 1862, Confederate General Braxton Bragg began the Confederate Heartland Offensive, which culminated in the Battle of Perryville, Kentucky, on October 8, 1862. Bragg intended to recruit troops and support in Kentucky and to divert the Union Army's attention from Chattanooga and Vicksburg, Mississippi. Union Major General Don Carlos Buell's army was in control of most of southeastern Tennessee. Buell decided to deploy his force to stop Bragg from marching on Nashville, Tennessee. Union Major General George H. Thomas held McMinnville with two divisions. Three other divisions were to the south at Altamont, Tennessee, where they could maneuver to concentrate at various points to block Bragg's routes to Nashville, although the terrain was rugged. Thomas thought that the army should concentrate at McMinnville, in part because the railroad provided a line of supply and in part because it would be easy for Bragg to bypass Altamont, which he did after a successful diversionary attack there by Confederate Colonel Joseph Wheeler's cavalry. After Buell decided to withdraw all of his forces to Murfreesboro, Tennessee and then to Nashville to protect against Bragg's offensive, he had to race north with his army when he realized Bragg's actual objective was Kentucky. After the Battle of Perryville, as Bragg discovered that few recruits and little support had been found for the Confederate cause in Kentucky, he withdrew to Murfreesboro in the face of growing Union forces and extended.

After the Battle of Stones River, or Murfreesboro, on December 31, 1862, and January 2, 1863, where Bragg faced a new Union commander, Major General William Rosecrans, Bragg retreated a short distance but still was located astride the main railroad about 30 miles (48 km) from Nashville on the line to Chattanooga. For six months Rosecrans rebuilt his army and supplies before finally launching the Tullahoma Campaign which drove the Confederates back to Chattanooga through skillful maneuvers and with only 540 casualties. Union forces were back in control of most of the Nashville and Chattanooga Railroad and its two connecting lines, the McMinnville and Manchester to the northeast from Tullahoma and the Winchester and Alabama Railroad to the southwest from Decherd, Tennessee, a few miles south of Tullahoma. Rosecrans established bases at McMinnville, Manchester and Winchester, Tennessee

== Post-war financial problems ==
After the American Civil War, the McMinnville and Manchester Railroad property was placed in the hands of a receiver appointed by the State of Tennessee.

Because the McMinnville and Manchester Railroad failed to pay interest on state bonds given in aid of its construction, the State of Tennessee foreclosed on its lien, or statutory mortgage, in 1871. A decree was entered in the state chancery court in Nashville, Tennessee, on April 7, 1871, which ordered the sale of the McMinnville and Manchester Railroad, its franchises and property. Because of uncertainty about whether the state could enforce the lien before the maturity date of the bonds, the railroad was given the right to purchase the road for a fair minimum price of $300,000. The court entered a decree on September 30, 1871, stating that the railroad had been sold to itself.

The McMinnville and Manchester Railroad Company never complied with the terms of sale. On June 28, 1875, another decree was entered by the court confirming the sale of the McMinnville and Manchester Railroad and the Winchester and Alabama Railroad to the Memphis and Charleston Railroad Company. On July 10, 1875, the Memphis and Charleston Railroad took title to the McMinnville and Manchester Railroad.

== Acquisition by the Nashville, Chattanooga and St. Louis Railway ==
On July 28, 1877, the Memphis and Charleston Railroad Company sold the McMinnville and Manchester Railroad and the Winchester and Alabama Railroad to the Nashville, Chattanooga and St. Louis Railway Company, which had been formed in 1872 through the consolidation of the Nashville and Chattanooga Railroad Company and the Nashville and Northwestern Railroad Company. The McMinnville and Manchester Railroad line became the McMinnville branch of the Nashville, Chattanooga and St. Louis Railway.

The Nashville, Chattanooga and St. Louis Railway Company extended the McMinnville Branch line from McMinnville, Tennessee to Sparta, Tennessee, which it had the right to do under the McMinnville and Manchester Railroad Company charter and the charter of the Southwestern Railroad Company (Tennessee), which the Nashville, Chattanooga and St. Louis Railway Company also had acquired.

The Southwestern Railroad Company also had defaulted on the state bonds issued in aid of its construction and the chancery court at Nashville, Tennessee entered a decree against it on June 8, 1871, and on July 6, 1871, the railroad was ordered sold. As with the McMinnville and Manchester, the railroad, franchises and property of the Southwestern Railroad were sold to the company itself, which subsequently sold them to the Nashville, Chattanooga and St. Louis Railway Company. The Nashville, Chattanooga and St. Louis Railway Company built the extension of the McMinnville Branch line from McMinnville, Tennessee, to Sparta, Tennessee. After the Nashville, Chattanooga and St. Louis Railway Company completed the extension of the McMinnville line, the McMinnville Branch extended 55 miles (89 km) from Tullahoma, Tennessee, to Doyle, Tennessee.

The Nashville, Chattanooga and St. Louis Railway later further extended the line to the Kentucky state line after it acquired the property and franchises of the Bon Air Railway Company on December 3, 1887.

== See also ==
- Confederate railroads in the American Civil War

== Bibliography ==
- Alexander, Edwin P. Civil War Railroads & Models. New York: The Fairfax Press, 1989. Originally published New York: C. N. Potter, 1977. ISBN 978-0-517-66557-2.
- DeBow, James Dunwoody Brownson. Legal history of the Entire System of Nashville, Chattanooga & St. Louis Ry. and Possessions. Nashville, TN: Press of Marshall & Bruce Co., 1900. OCLC 6480550. Retrieved June 22, 2015.
- Hess, Earl J. Banners to the Breeze: The Kentucky Campaign, Corinth, and Stones River. Lincoln, NE: University of Nebraska Press, 2000. ISBN 978-0-8032-2380-6.
- Poor, Henry V. Manual of Railroads of the United States, 1868-1869. New York: H.V. & H.W. Poor, 1868. OCLC 79608192
- Poor, Henry V. Railroad Manual of the United States, 1878 New York: H.V. & H.W. Poor, 1878.
- Poor, Henry V. Poor's Manual of Railroads of the United States, 1885. New York: H.V. & H.W. Poor, 1885. OCLC 504727008.
- Stow, F. H. The Capitalist's Guide and Railway Annual for 1859. New York, Samuel T. Callahan, 1859. OCLC 7928361.
- Woodworth, Steven E. Six Armies in Tennessee: The Chickamauga and Chattanooga Campaigns
