= Yankeetown, Tennessee =

- Unincorporated community
- Location within Tennessee Location within the United States
- Coordinates: 35°59′18″N 85°25′23″W
- Country: United States
- State: Tennessee
- County: White
- Elevation: 968 ft (295 m)
- Time zone: UTC-6 (Central (CST))
  - Summer (DST): UTC-5 (CDT)
- Area code: 931
- GNIS feature ID: 1314542

Yankeetown (also Yankee Town) is an unincorporated community in White County, Tennessee, United States.
