= Center Hill Lake =

Reservoir in Tennessee, United States

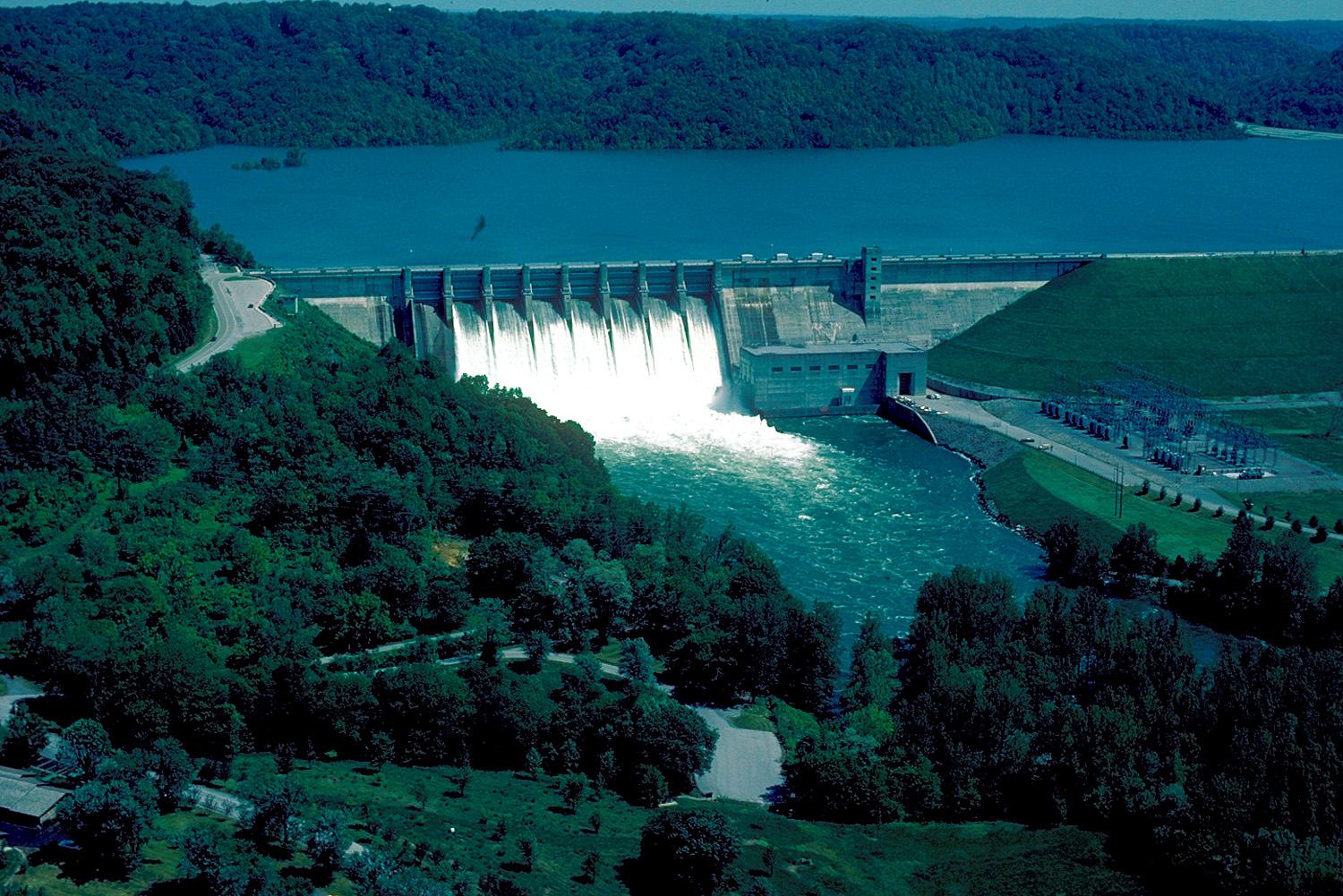
- Center Hill Dam and Lake

- Location within Tennessee Location within the United States
- Location: DeKalb / Putnam / White / Warren counties, Middle Tennessee
- Coordinates: 36°05′49″N 85°49′36″W
- Type: Reservoir
- Primary inflows: Caney Fork River; Falling Water River
- Catchment area: 2,174 sq mi (5,630 km^{2})
- Basin countries: United States
- Max. length: 64 mi (103 km)
- Surface area: 18,220 acres (7,370 ha)
- Max. depth: 190 ft (58 m)
- Water volume: 762,000 acre⋅ft (940,000,000 m^{3})
- Surface elevation: 633 ft (193 m)

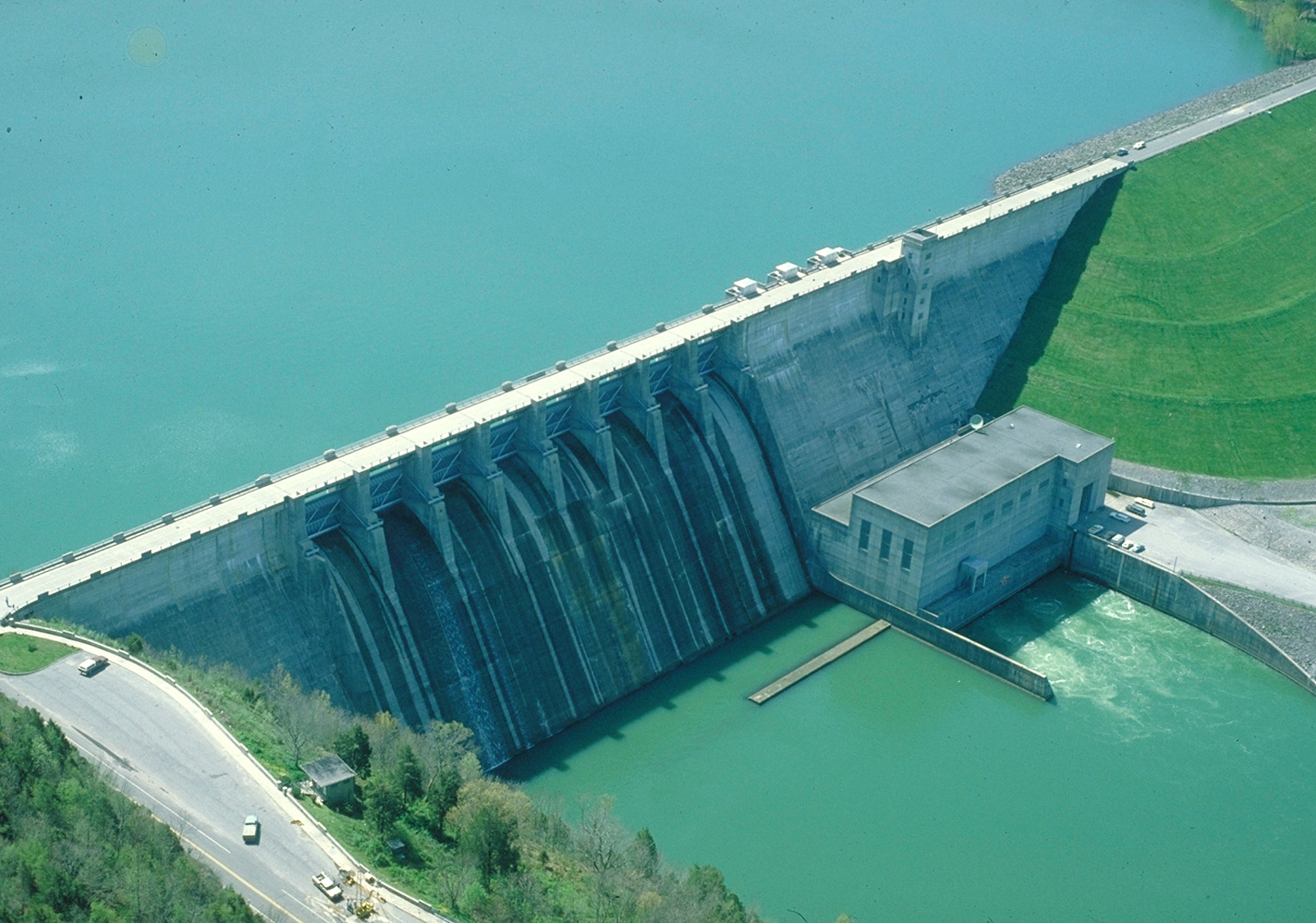
Center Hill Dam

Center Hill Lake is a reservoir in the U.S. state of Tennessee. It is located in Middle Tennessee near Smithville. Created by means of a dam constructed by the U.S. Army Corps of Engineers in 1948, the lake has a dual purpose: electricity production and flood control. Center Hill Dam is 260 ft (79 m) high, and it is composed of concrete and earth structures, with 8 gates that are 50 ft (15 m) wide each. Center Hill Lake is one of four major flood control reservoirs for the Cumberland; the others being Percy Priest Lake, Dale Hollow Reservoir, and Lake Cumberland.

== Geography ==
The lake, which is 64 mi (103 km) long, covers an area of 18,220 acres (73.7 km^{2}). Center Hill Lake has a storage capacity of 762,000 acre⋅ft (940,000,000 m^{3}) of water. The lake has approximately 415 mi (668 km) of shoreline, with the deepest point at 190 ft (58 m). The watershed area for the lake is 2,174 sq mi (5,630 km^{2}). The lake is well known for water recreation and fishing.

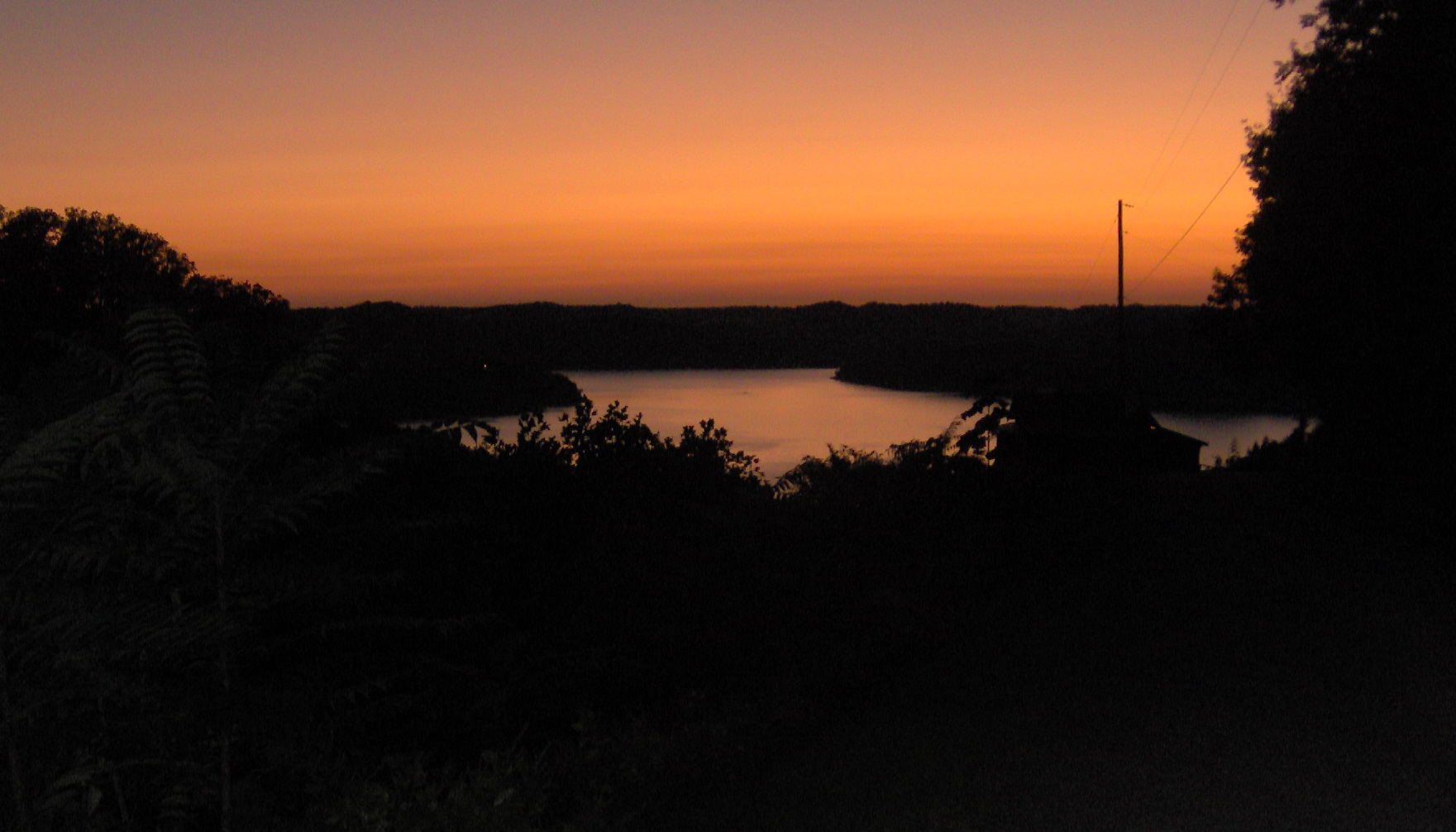
Sunset over Center Hill Lake

Major tributaries of Center Hill Lake include the Caney Fork (the main tributary) and the Falling Water River.

Edgar Evins, Burgess Falls and Rock Island State Parks contain portions of the lake's shoreline, the rest of which has been relatively underdeveloped until recent years. Lately, the area surrounding Center Hill Lake has been the target of land developers, who have begun construction on several upper-middle-class vacation homes and condos. Some locals protest that these actions are destroying the beauty of nature that make it such an attractive locale for such developments.

== History ==
=== 1940-1948: Construction ===
In the aftermath of the December 7, 1941 attack on Pearl Harbor, the U.S. Congress authorized the use of War Department funds to build dams at Center Hill and Dale Hollow that would generate the power required to support defense industry in the Southeastern United States.

In early 1942, the Corps opened bidding to private contractors. An $11,666,000 contract was awarded to a joint venture firm made up of the Massman Construction Company, Metcalf Construction Company and Gordon Hamilton Contracting Company.

Wartime manpower and material shortages began to slow work on the dam beginning in fall of 1942.

In 1943, the Corps suspended construction on Center Hill to focus on the completion of the dam at Dale Hollow.

After World War II ended, construction resumed in January 1946. Modifications to the Rivers and Harbors Act authorized Center Hill Dam for power production. Construction of the dam's basic flood control mechanisms was completed in November 1948 and Center Hill Lake was created as the reservoir was filled.

=== 1949-1951: Completion of Power Production Facilities ===
To avoid a loss of momentum, the existing contract with Massman-Metcalf-Gordon was modified to include the construction of power producing facilities. Construction ended in spring of 1951 and totaled around $100 million.

=== 2007: Risk for Failure ===
In January 2007, the U.S. Army Corps of Engineers placed Center Hill Dam under a high risk for failure, along with Wolf Creek Dam in Russell County, Kentucky. In 2008, the lake's water level was lowered between five and ten feet relieve pressure on the dam and allow repairs begin.

=== 2008-2020: Repairs and Reopening ===
Center Hill Dam required three phases of repair work that cost an estimated $353 million. Work began in 2008 and reached completion in 2020. Between 2005 and 2020, the lake's water levels were reduced by as much as 18 feet.

During the first phase of repairs, concrete was pumped into the foundation to fill gaps that formed as the structure decayed. In the second phase, a 308-foot tall foundation wall was installed on the dam's lake side to stop leaks through the limestone. The third phase saw the construction of an additional auxiliary dam on Center Hill Dam's eastern side to be used to reduce pressure on the main dam during a major flood.

Improvements were made by the Army Corps of Engineers to recreational areas around the lake and the parking lot was greatly expanded.

Electricity from the dam is marketed by the Southeastern Power Administration.
