= Southwestern Railroad (Tennessee) =

The Southwestern Railroad started a 5 ft (1,524 mm) gauge spur line from Sparta, Tennessee to McMinnville, Tennessee to connect with the McMinnville and Manchester Railroad. The Southwestern Railroad Company was chartered in 1851–52 to build a railroad from Danville, Kentucky to McMinnville in less than ten years. The company received several extensions to complete the road during and after the American Civil War. Former Confederate general George Gibbs Dibrell served as president. The company went bankrupt in 1871 having constructed only a small part of the road from McMinnville to Sparta. Nashville, Chattanooga & St. Louis Railway (NC&StL) purchased the assets. In 1884, NC&StL finished the 26-mile (42 km) segment to Sparta to reach the coal mines at Bon Air, Tennessee.

The track is operated today by the Caney Fork & Western Railroad (CFWR).
