= Doyle, Tennessee =

- Town
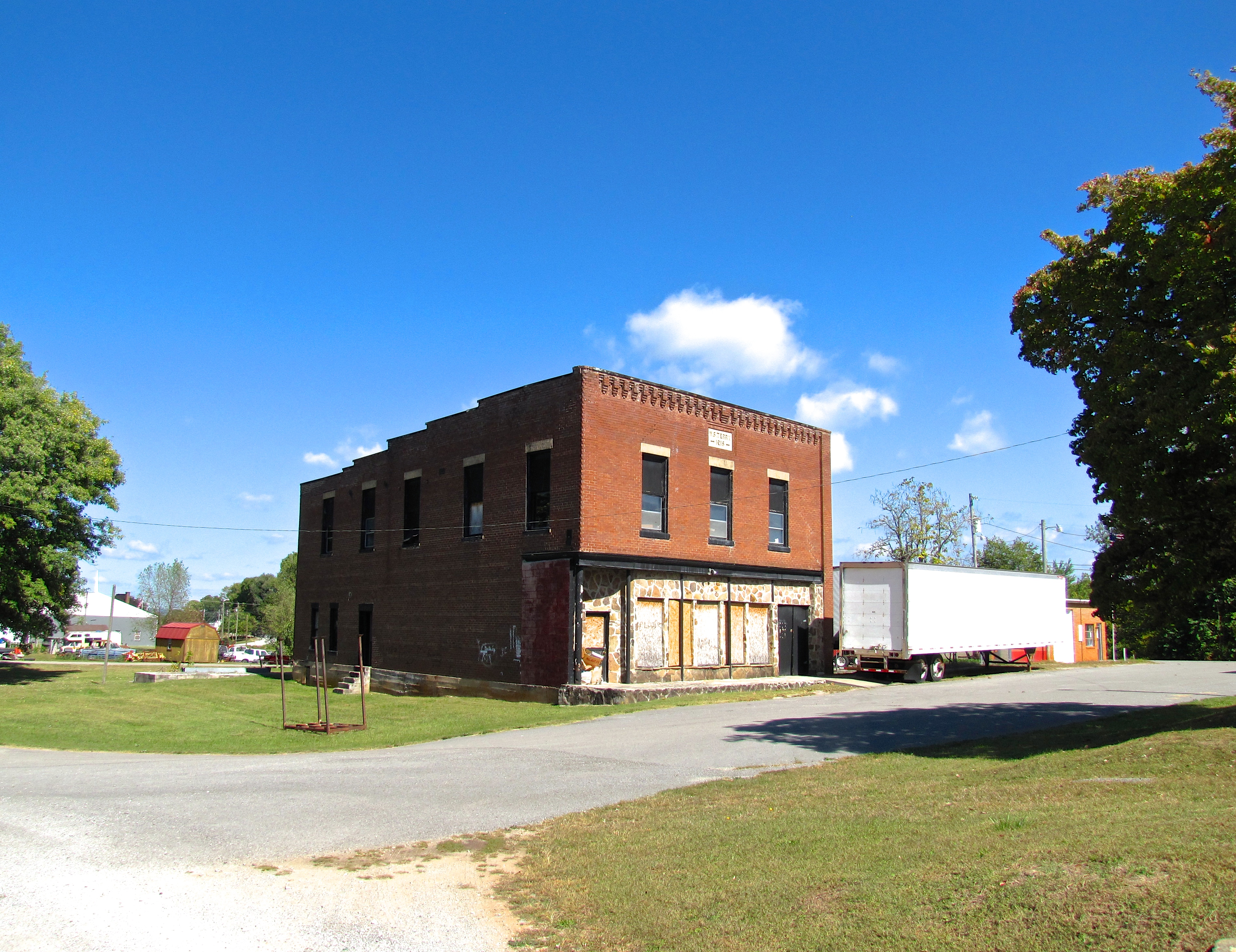
- The W.S. Terry building in Doyle

- Location of Doyle in White County, Tennessee.
- Coordinates: 35°51′13″N 85°30′47″W
- Country: United States
- State: Tennessee
- County: White
- Incorporated: 1905
- Named after: Doyle family (early settlers)

Area
  - Total: 1.24 sq mi (3.20 km^{2})
  - Land: 1.24 sq mi (3.20 km^{2})
  - Water: 0 sq mi (0.00 km^{2})
- Elevation: 951 ft (290 m)

Population (2020)
  - Total: 493
  - Density: 398.9/sq mi (154.02/km^{2})
- Time zone: UTC-6 (Central (CST))
  - Summer (DST): UTC-5 (CDT)
- ZIP code: 38559
- Area code: 931
- FIPS code: 47-21500
- GNIS feature ID: 1282764

Doyle is a town in White County, Tennessee, United States. As of the 2020 census, Doyle had a population of 493.

== History ==
Doyle, originally known as Doyle Station, developed as a railroad stop in the early 1880s. By 1884, Doyle College had been established, and would operate in the town for more than four decades. Goodspeed's History of White County, Tennessee, published in the late 1880s, indicated the town had about 150 residents. The town incorporated in 1905.

== Geography ==
Doyle is located at 35°51′13″N 85°30′47″W (35.853664, -85.512981). The town is situated along the Highland Rim at the eastern base of a ridge known as Gum Spring Mountain. The Calfkiller River empties into the Caney Fork just southeast of Doyle.

U.S. Route 70S, which connects Doyle with Sparta to the northeast and McMinnville to the southwest, and State Route 285, which connects Doyle with the Spencer and Fall Creek Falls areas to the southeast, intersect just inside Doyle's southeastern city limits. State Route 111 passes just east of Doyle.

According to the United States Census Bureau, the town has a total area of 1.3 square miles (3.4 km^{2}), all of it land.

== Demographics ==
Historical population
| Census | Pop. | Note | %± |
|---|---|---|---|
| 1970 | 446 | | — |
| 1980 | 344 | | −22.9% |
| 1990 | 345 | | 0.3% |
| 2000 | 525 | | 52.2% |
| 2010 | 537 | | 2.3% |
| 2020 | 493 | | −8.2% |

=== 2020 census ===
Doyle racial composition
| Race | Number | Percentage |
|---|---|---|
| White (non-Hispanic) | 448 | 90.87% |
| Black or African American (non-Hispanic) | 4 | 0.81% |
| Asian | 4 | 0.81% |
| Other/Mixed | 22 | 4.46% |
| Hispanic or Latino | 15 | 3.04% |

As of the 2020 United States census, there were 493 people, 266 households, and 174 families residing in the town.

=== 2000 census ===
As of the census of 2000, there were 525 people, 224 households, and 155 families residing in the town. The population density was 410.6 inhabitants per square mile (158.5/km^{2}). There were 252 housing units at an average density of 197.1 per square mile (76.1/km^{2}). The racial makeup of the town was 98.29% White, 0.19% African American, 0.19% Native American, 0.76% from other races, and 0.57% from two or more races. Hispanic or Latino of any race were 1.33% of the population.

There were 224 households, out of which 26.3% had children under the age of 18 living with them, 51.8% were married couples living together, 9.8% had a female householder with no husband present, and 30.4% were non-families. 26.3% of all households were made up of individuals, and 12.9% had someone living alone who was 65 years of age or older. The average household size was 2.34 and the average family size was 2.80.

In the town, the population was spread out, with 21.9% under the age of 18, 7.4% from 18 to 24, 28.0% from 25 to 44, 26.1% from 45 to 64, and 16.6% who were 65 years of age or older. The median age was 40 years. For every 100 females, there were 97.4 males. For every 100 females age 18 and over, there were 86.4 males.

The median income for a household in the town was $26,364, and the median income for a family was $28,958. Males had a median income of $21,538 versus $17,188 for females. The per capita income for the town was $13,619. About 17.2% of families and 21.3% of the population were below the poverty line, including 19.9% of those under age 18 and 23.4% of those age 65 or over.
