= Tennessee House of Representatives 40th district =

State legislative district in Tennessee

Tennessee's 40th State House of Representatives district
- Map of Tennessee House districts with the 40th District shaded in red
Representative
Michael Hale; R–Dayton
since 2023
- Demographics: 89.8% White; 1.6% Black; 4.5% Hispanic; 0.5% Asian; 3.4% Multiracial
- Population (2024): 71,233

The Tennessee House of Representatives 40th district is one of the 99 legislative districts in the lower house of the Tennessee General Assembly. The district is located in Middle Tennessee and covers Cannon County, DeKalb, Jackson County, Smith County and part of Wilson counties. The district includes Gainesboro, Carthage, Smithville, and Woodbury. It also includes Dowelltown, and Gordonsville. The Cumberland River flows through the north of the district, while Center Hill Lake defines part of the eastern border. The rest of the district is unincorporated and mostly rural. Michael Hale has represented the district since 2023.

== Demographics ==
The Tennessee Comptroller estimates the population as of 2024 at 71,233.

- 89.8% of the district is White
- 4.5% of the district is Hispanic
- 1.6% of the district is Black
- 0.5% of the district is Asian
- 3.4% of the district is Two or more races

Detailed demographic information is also available through Census Reporter.

== History ==
The 88th Tennessee General Assembly was the first in which all districts were numbered. At this time, the 40th district was in Cannon, DeKalb, Rutherford and Smith counties. From the 93rd-97th GAs, it was part of Cannon, DeKalb, Smith and Wilson counties. From the 98th-102nd GAs, it was composed of Cannon, DeKalb, Smith, and part of Macon counties. From the 103rd to 107th GAs, it was composed of DeKalb, Smith, and Macon counties. From the 108th-112th GAs, it was composed of Smith, Trousdale and part of DeKalb and Sumner counties. Since the 113th General Assembly, it has been composed of Cannon, DeKalb, Jackson, Smith and part of Wilson counties.

== List of Representatives ==
Representative	Party	Years of Service	General Assembly	Hometown
Michael Hale	Republican	2023-present	113th-114th	Smithville
Terri Lynn Weaver	Republican	2009-2022	106th-112th	Lancaster
Frank Buck	Democratic	1973-2008	88th-105th	Dowelltown
