= Frank Buck (Tennessee politician) =

American politician (1943–2024)

Member of the Tennessee House of Representatives from the 40th district
- In office January 9, 1973 – January 13, 2009
- Preceded by: Constituency established
- Succeeded by: Terri Lynn Weaver

Personal details
- Born: Frank Forrest Buck; September 26, 1943 Trousdale County, Tennessee, U.S.
- Died: January 24, 2024 (aged 80) Smithville, Tennessee, U.S.
- Party: Democratic
- Spouse: Lena Ann Graves
- Children: 4
- Education: Tennessee Technological University (BS); University of Tennessee (JD)

Frank Forrest Buck (September 26, 1943 – January 24, 2024) was an American politician and member of the Tennessee House of Representatives from 1973 to 2009. He represented the 40th district, which included DeKalb, Smith, and Macon counties.

== Life and career ==
Buck was the son of John and Georgia Baird Buck. He had one brother, John William Buck. His father, John, started out as a sharecropper and eventually owned over 500 acres (2.0 km^{2}) of land in Wilson, Smith, and Trousdale counties. Neither of his parents completed the eighth grade, as they dropped out of school to work during the Great Depression. His father was stricken with polio while Buck was at Lebanon High School. His father spent many months at Vanderbilt Medical Center recovering from black lung, but never walked again.

Buck served as a member of the House for thirty-six years. He was re-elected as a member of the Democratic Party. Buck was Vice-Chair of the House Transportation Committee and the Chair of the House Public Transportation and Highways Subcommittee. He served as Chair of the House Judiciary Committee, a member of the House Judicial Administration Subcommittee, and the House Criminal Practice and Procedure Subcommittee.

Buck graduated with a Bachelor of Science degree in business administration from Tennessee Technological University and graduated with a J.D. from University of Tennessee Law School. He works as a farmer and as an attorney, owning a law practice with his wife, Lena Ann Graves Buck, also an attorney, called Buck & Buck Attorneys at Law near Smithville. He and Lena have 4 daughters, Kathy, Melinda, Sara and Jennifer. In 1990, Frank Buck narrowly lost to Bill Purcell in a bid for the position of House majority leader by two votes.

Buck is known for efforts on ethics reform, with a long and lengthy record of supporting and passing ethics reform in his thirty-six year long legislative career. He exposed a whiskey-for-votes racket operating in DeKalb County and helped to bring reform as a member of the DeKalb County Ethics Commission. In 1994, he took issue with the expense of different execution methods reported by Department of Correction officials that placed a firing-squad execution at $7,000.

Buck also passed legislation that resulted in the highway logo advertising seen on Tennessee highways. He also enacted the "Lemonade Stand Bill" which prevented the Tennessee Department of Health from requiring certificates of health from lemonade stands.

In 1993 and 1994, Buck introduced legislation that would have restrained lobbyists from giving gifts and paying travel expenses of members of the General Assembly, and forced more disclosure of such acts. In 1994, he sponsored a bill introduced by former Sen. Carol Rice that became known as the "cup-of-coffee" bill, which would have prevented legislators from taking so much as a cup of coffee from lobbyists. A version of it was passed in 1995—without Buck as a sponsor—with a loophole that allowed legislators to receive free meals and drinks if another legislator is invited. He has received numerous awards from groups for his work on ethics reform including one from Common Cause for the Cup of Coffee bill.

In February 2008, Buck announced he would not run for re-election and would retire when his current term expired.

Buck died in Smithville, Tennessee, on January 24, 2024, at the age of 80.
