= Joe L. Evins =

American politician (1910–1984)

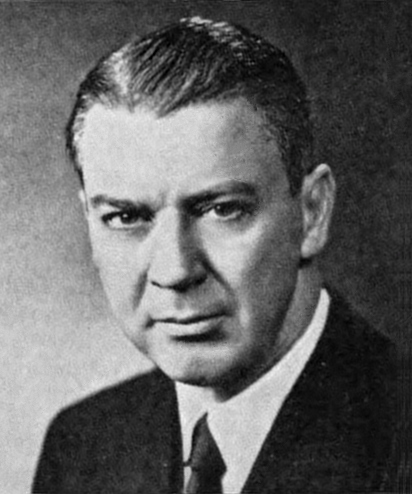
- Evins in 1973

Member of the U.S. House of Representatives from Tennessee
- In office January 3, 1947 – January 3, 1977
- Preceded by: Harold Earthman
- Succeeded by: Albert Gore Jr.
- Constituency: 5th district (1947-1953); 4th district (1953-1977)

Personal details
- Born: Joseph Landon Evins; October 24, 1910 DeKalb County, Tennessee, U.S.
- Died: March 31, 1984 (aged 73) Nashville, Tennessee, U.S.
- Resting place: Smithville Town Cemetery
- Party: Democratic
- Relatives: Dan Evins (nephew)
- Education: Vanderbilt University; Cumberland School of Law; George Washington University

Joseph Landon Evins (October 24, 1910 – March 31, 1984) was an American lawyer and politician who served 15 terms as a Democratic U.S. Representative from Tennessee from 1947 to 1977.

== Early life ==
Evins was a native of the Blend Community of DeKalb County, Tennessee, the son of James Edgar Evins and Myrtie Goodson Evins. His father was a Tennessee state senator and a successful local businessman. He was also the namesake of Edgar Evins State Park near Smithville. One of his brother's children ran a local bank. Another nephew, Dan Evins, was the founder of the Cracker Barrel Old Country Store restaurant chain.

Evins graduated from Vanderbilt University in Nashville, Tennessee, in 1933 and the Cumberland School of Law in Lebanon, Tennessee, in 1934, as well as The George Washington University. He was admitted to the bar in that same year and began practice in Smithville, the county seat of DeKalb County.

== Career ==
In 1935 Evins was named a staff attorney for the Federal Trade Commission, and served in this position until 1938, when he was named the FTC's assistant secretary, a position which he held until 1940.

Shortly after U.S. entry into World War II, he was commissioned in the United States Army Judge Advocate General Corps, serving on active duty until 1946, when he resumed his law practice in Smithville.

Upon his return, he was also elected chairman of the DeKalb County Democratic Party.

=== Congress ===
Later in that same year, he won the nomination of the Democratic Party for the seat from the 5th District, defeating first-term incumbent Harold Earthman. He won the election easily in this solidly-Democratic area, and was re-elected to fourteen more terms, generally with little or no opposition. He had a regular Republican opponent in only three of the elections. His district was renumbered the 4th after the 1950 Census, when Tennessee lost a congressional district.

Evins was a powerful figure in Congress. He was chair of the House Select Committee on Small Business for six terms, and for the following Congress of the permanent Small Business Committee, and chaired the Speaker's patronage committee for five terms. Most importantly he served on the House Appropriations Committee for eleven terms and was chair of its Subcommittee on Independent Offices and the Department of Housing and Urban Development for three terms and, even more critically its Subcommittee on Public Works for three terms.

He used his influence to make sure that his district, a mostly rural area east and south of Nashville, was well taken-care of; Smithville was the smallest city chosen for participation in the Model Cities Program and its major thoroughfare was renamed "Congressional Boulevard."

The Tennessee Technological University Appalachian Center for Craft near Smithville was built with a $5 million federal grant that Evins secured as a member of the Appropriations Committee.

Evins was slow to accept racial desegregation. He signed the 1956 Southern Manifesto and voted against the Civil Rights Acts of 1957, 1960, 1964, and 1968. But Evins voted present on the 24th Amendment to the U.S. Constitution. and voted in favor of the Voting Rights Act of 1965. For the most part, Evins had a liberal voting record as a Congressman.

Evins decided not to stand for re-election in 1976, after serving a total of 15 terms. At the time of his retirement in January 1977, his continuous service in the U.S. House of Representatives was longer than that of any other House member from Tennessee.

In a spirited primary to succeed him, Al Gore won and began his political career.

== Personal life ==
His wife, Ann Smartt, with whom he had three daughters, was the daughter of a McMinnville judge.

=== Death and burial ===
Evins died in Nashville on March 31, 1984, and is buried in the Smithville Town Cemetery in Smithville.

U.S. House of Representatives
Preceded by Harold Earthman	Member of the U.S. House of Representatives from Tennessee's 5th congressional district 1947–1953	Succeeded by J. Percy Priest
Preceded by Albert Gore Sr.	Member of the U.S. House of Representatives from Tennessee's 4th congressional district 1953–1977	Succeeded by Albert S. Gore Jr.
