= James Edgar Evins =

American politician (1883–1954)

Member of the Tennessee Senate

Personal details
- Born: December 31, 1883 DeKalb County, Tennessee, U.S.
- Died: March 22, 1954 (aged 70) Nashville, Tennessee, U.S.
- Spouse: Myrtie Goodson
- Children: 2, including Joe L. Evins
- Relatives: Dan Evins (grandson)

James Edgar Evins (December 31, 1883 – March 22, 1954) was an American politician. He served as a member of the Tennessee Senate. He was also the mayor of Smithville, Tennessee, for 16 years. He is the namesake of Edgar Evins State Park, established in 1975 in part due to work by his son Congressman Joe L. Evins.
