= Edgar Evins State Park =

State park in Tennessee, United States

Coordinates: 36°5′7″N 85°49′1″W

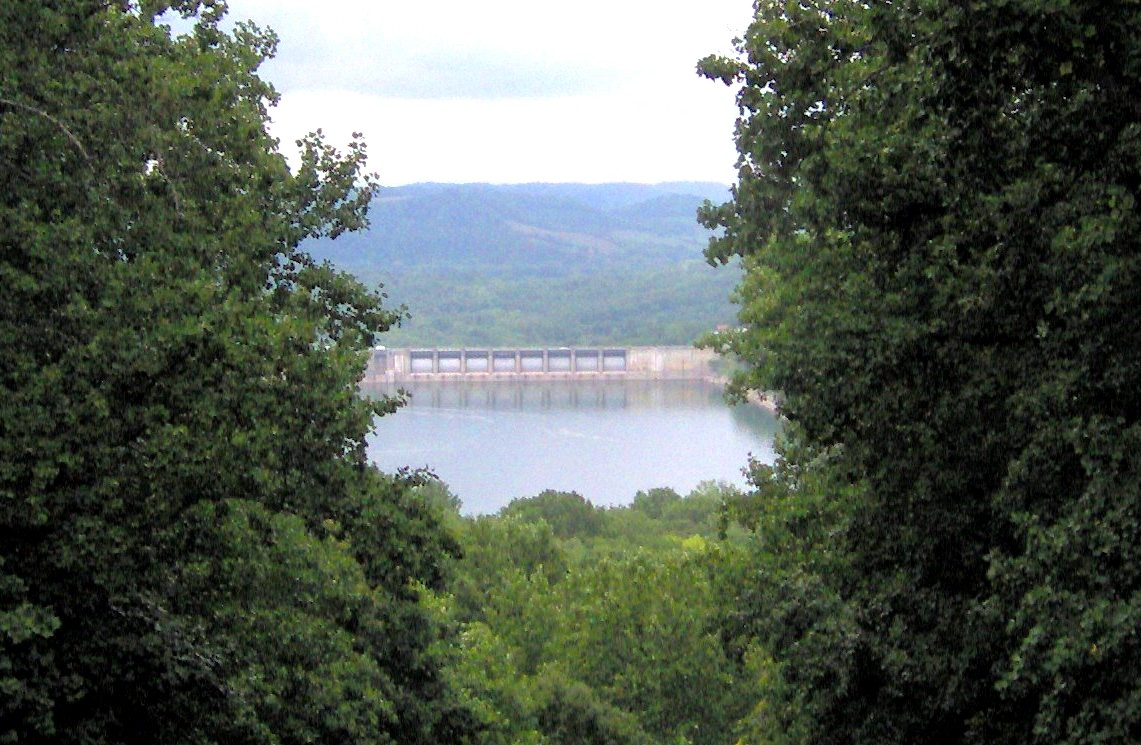
- View of Center Hill Dam from visitor center observation tower in 2008
- Interactive map of Edgar Evins State Park
- Type: Tennessee State Park
- Location: DeKalb County, Tennessee
- Area: 6,300 acres (25 km^{2})
- Operator: Tennessee Department of Environment and Conservation
- Website: Official website

Edgar Evins State Park is a state park in DeKalb County, Tennessee, in the southeastern United States. The park consists of 6,300 acres (25 km^{2}) along the shores of Center Hill Lake, an impoundment of the Caney Fork River. The State of Tennessee leases the land from the U.S. Army Corps of Engineers.

James Edgar Evins (1883–1954), the park's namesake, was a Smithville businessman, mayor, and state senator who played a vital role in the development of the Center Hill Dam and Reservoir in the 1940s. He was the father of former United States Representative Joe L. Evins, for whom the nearby Joe L. Evins Appalachian Center for Craft is named. The Evins family began pushing for the establishment of a state park along the DeKalb County portion of Center Hill Lake as early as the 1950s.

== Geographical setting ==
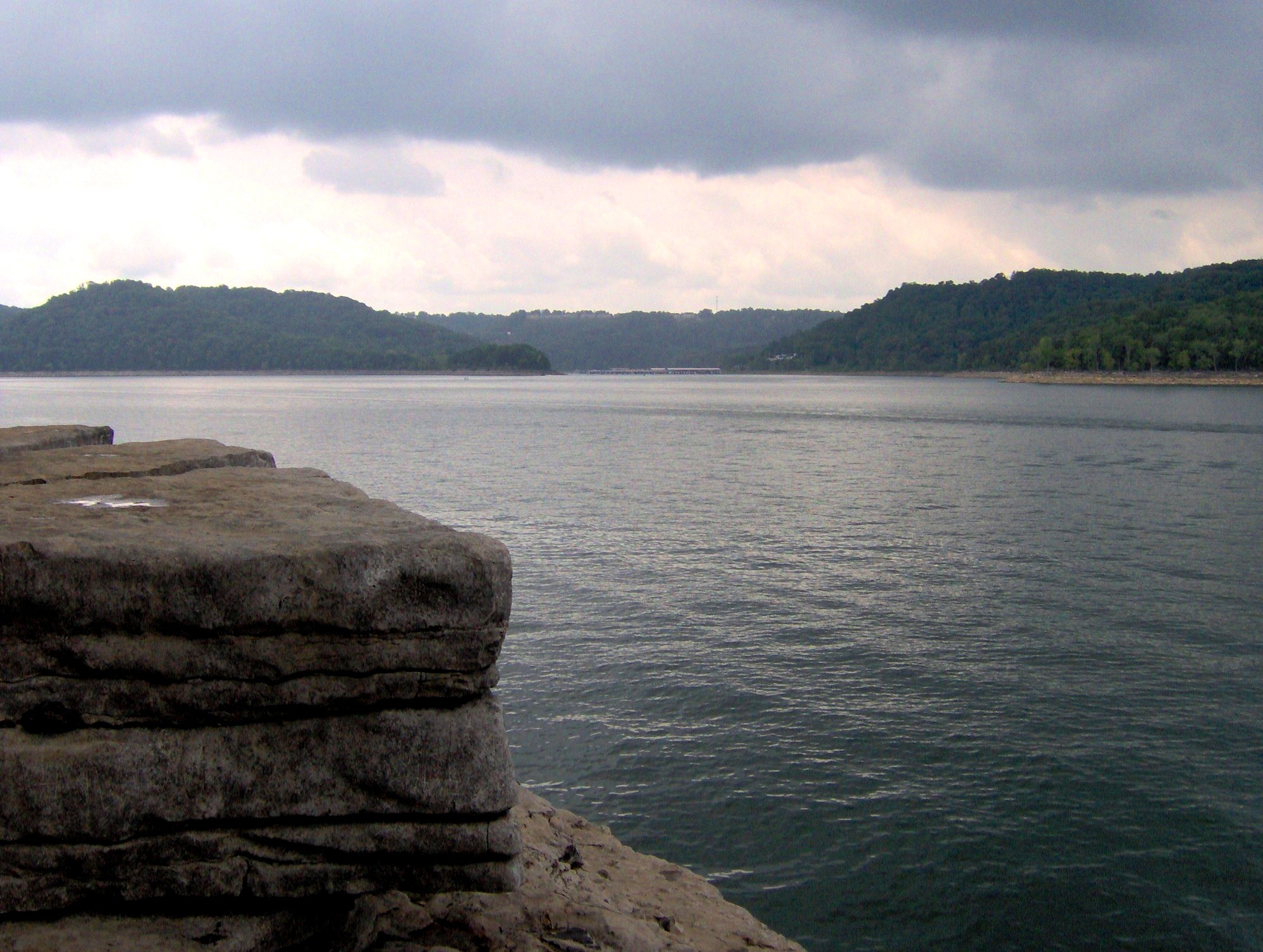
Center Hill Lake, viewed from a limestone bluff near the primitive campground

The Caney Fork flows down from its source atop the Cumberland Plateau and winds its way northwestward across the Eastern Highland Rim before emptying into the Cumberland River near Carthage, Tennessee. Center Hill Dam, located approximately 26.6 miles (42.8 km) above the mouth of the Caney Fork, has created a reservoir that spans a 68-mile (109 km) stretch of the river between the dam and the Great Falls Dam at Rock Island State Park in adjacent Warren County. Edgar Evins State Park covers the northeast shore of the reservoir immediately upstream from Center Hill Dam.

The park is situated amidst rolling hills ("knobs") that comprise part of the geological boundary between the Eastern Highland Rim and the Central Basin. These hills are typically underlain by Mississippian period limestone, the erosion of which has created karst-like formations throughout the Center Hill Basin. Outcroppings of this limestone are visible along the cliffs overlooking the lake.

Most of Edgar Evins State Park is coated in a second-growth hardwood forest typical of the Eastern Highland Rim. Common tree species include the tuliptree, white basswood, sugar maple, white ash, Virginian juniper and various species of oak and hickory.

== History ==
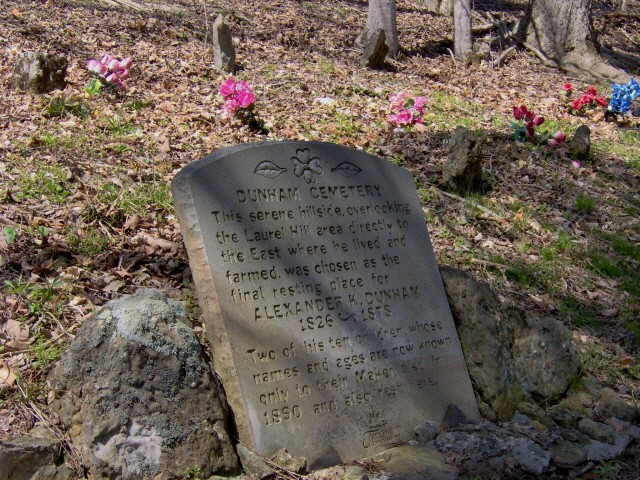
Dunham Cemetery

A pre-inundation archaeological survey of the Center Hill Basin conducted by the Smithsonian Institution located several possible prehistoric village and mound sites, including a 10-foot (3.0 m) platform mound at the mouth of Mine Lick Creek, just upstream from the modern park boundary. Early settlers in the area also claimed to have found Native American graves and other objects. More extensive excavations, however, failed to uncover any major prehistoric sites.

The earliest Euro-American settlers in the DeKalb area arrived in the late 1790s and established the town of Liberty just west of the modern park. Over the years, several families settled in the hollows and valleys of what is now Edgar Evins State Park and adjacent lands that would eventually be inundated by Center Hill Lake. One such settler, Alexander Dunham (1826–1878), whose family arrived in the area in the 1830s, is buried on a hill within the park that overlooks Center Hill Lake. Dunham's son lived near the present site of Center Hill Dam.

The Caney Fork has long been notorious for its volatility. In the late 19th and early 20th centuries, business venture after business venture tried to harness the river's power, only to be defeated by one of several catastrophic floods that occurred along the river during this period. Major floods in 1902, 1915, 1928, and 1929 wiped out mills, bridges, houses, and farms, and led to increased calls for flood control. In the 1930s, the U.S. Army Corps of Engineers initiated several flood control projects in the Cumberland River watershed, including Center Hill Dam, the construction of which was authorized in 1938. Flood control and power production were the primary goals of the Center Hill Dam project.

Center Hill Lake's revised management plan in the 1940s called for the inclusion of recreational areas along the lake's shores. These included several small local parks and boatramps at first. In the late 1960s, the State of Tennessee began construction of facilities for Edgar Evins State Park. The park was officially dedicated in 1975.

== Park facilities ==
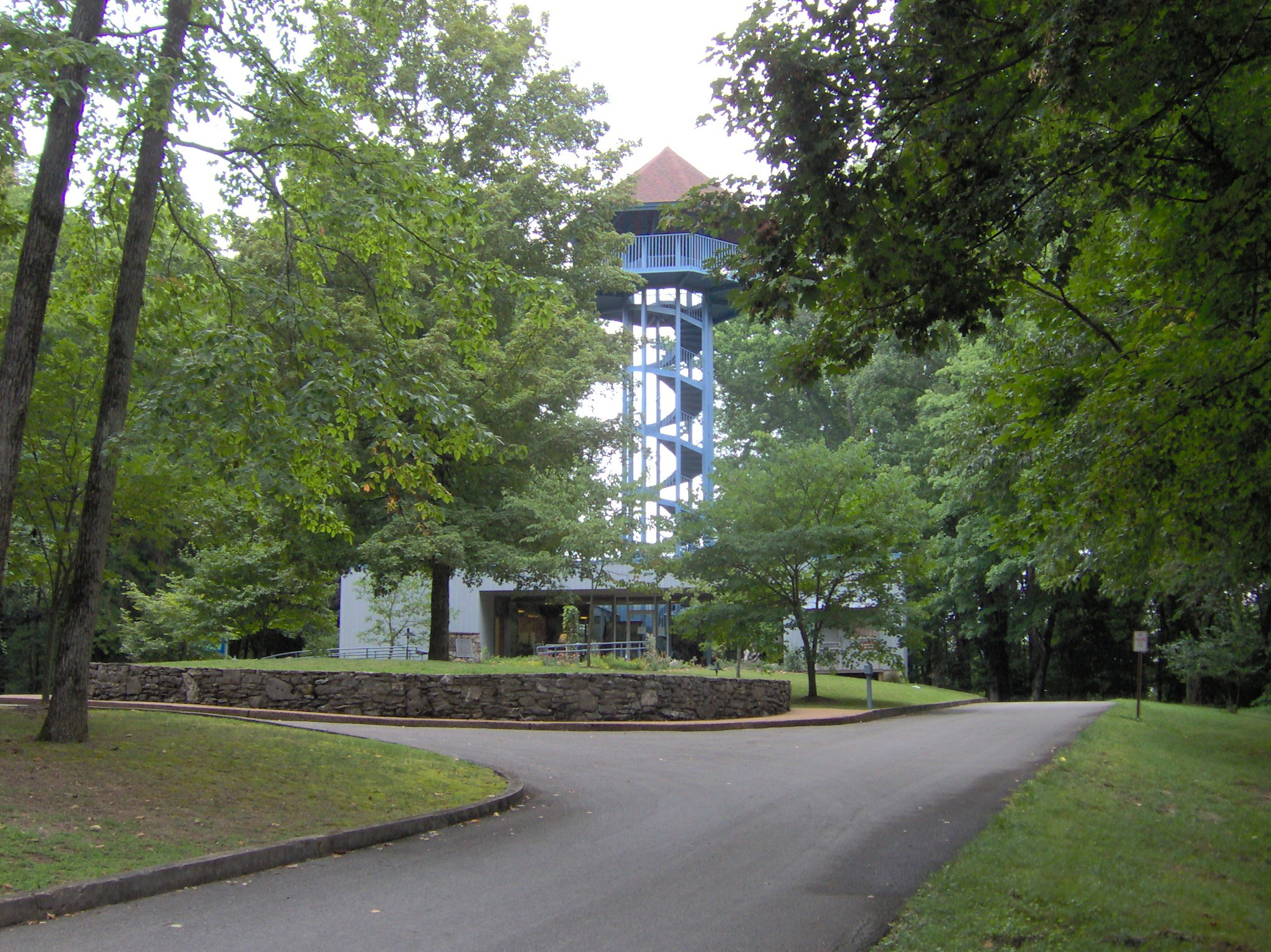
Park office and observation tower in 2008

Park facilities include a privately leased 300-slip marina and full service dock, a 34-cabin lodging complex (with outdoor swimming pool open May to September), a campground with 60 wooden and concrete platforms (with water and electric) and 9 primitive campsites, a park office and visitor center, and two boat ramps with access to Center Hill Lake. Additionally, there are three picnic shelters located adjacent to the marina, four picnic areas with concrete tables, an "interpretive center" with local natural and historical artifacts, and a campground store, which is operated from spring to fall. A boat dock available for cabin guests is located at the very end of the main road, along with the "Sunset Point Peninsula", a day use area.

The Friends of Edgar Evins State Park was organized in 2003 to support park preservation efforts. The group conducts several annual events in the park.

=== Hiking trails ===
List of hiking trails – Edgar Evins State Park
Name	Length	Summary
Highland Rim Trail	1.35 mi (2.17 km)	Begins at a small parking area in front of the visitor center. Descends down a steep hill to near the shore of Center Hill Lake before climbing back up to right behind the visitor center. Trail is marked as 2 miles (3.2 km) on sign at beginning.
Jack L. Clayborn Millennium Trail	2.35 mi (3.78 km)	Named for longtime maintenance and facilities supervisor. Begins at a parking area along the main road. Loops back around to starting point.
Merritt Ridge Trail and Connector	5.35 mi (8.61 km)	Traverses the Merritt Ridge, which is across a lake cove from the main park. Accessed by a 1.5-mile (2.4 km) connector trail from the Millennium Loop. Entire length of loop and connector is 5.35 miles (8.61 km). The entire length of the Millennium and Merritt Ridge loops is 7.7 miles (12.4 km). Trail is very rugged and steep in places.
Dunham Cemetery	0.25 mi (0.40 km)	Short, steep trail that ascends to a small cemetery where former resident Alexander Dunham and two of his children are buried. Accessed via parking area along main road.
Marina/Campground Trail	0.9 mi (1.4 km)	Connector trail from near site 60 in campground to marina parking lot. Halfway point includes an access point to main road directly across from Millennium Trailhead parking area.
Evins Ridge Nature Trail	0.6 mi (0.97 km)	Marked at trailhead as a 1/2-mile (0.80 km) loop trail. Accessed at the Interpretive Center.
Storybook Trail	0.4 mi (0.64 km)	Kid-friendly loop trail with a children's nature story posted on signs throughout the trail. Opened in 2018. Accessed at the Interpretive Center.
Cycling Trail (proposed)	~6 mi (9.7 km)	Proposed trail for both hiking and bicycling. Part of the trail is currently under construction.

== Photo gallery ==
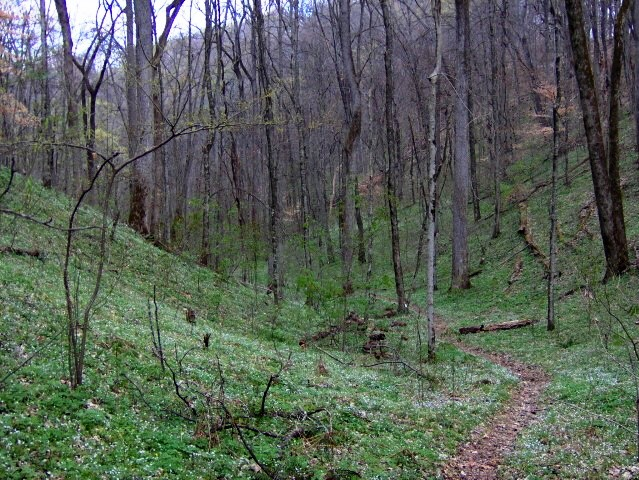
The Highland Rim Trail in early Spring

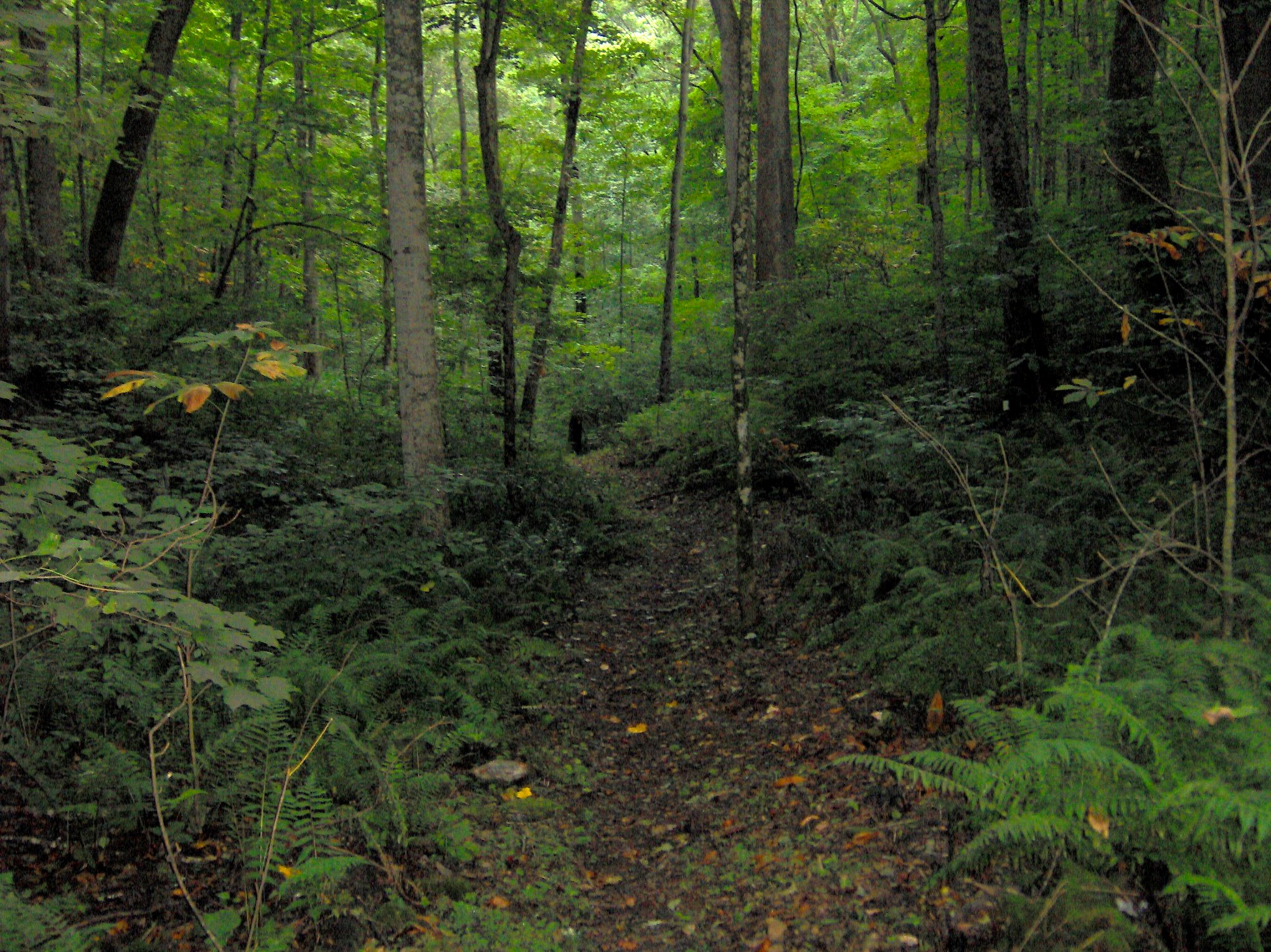
The Highland Rim Trail in mid-Summer

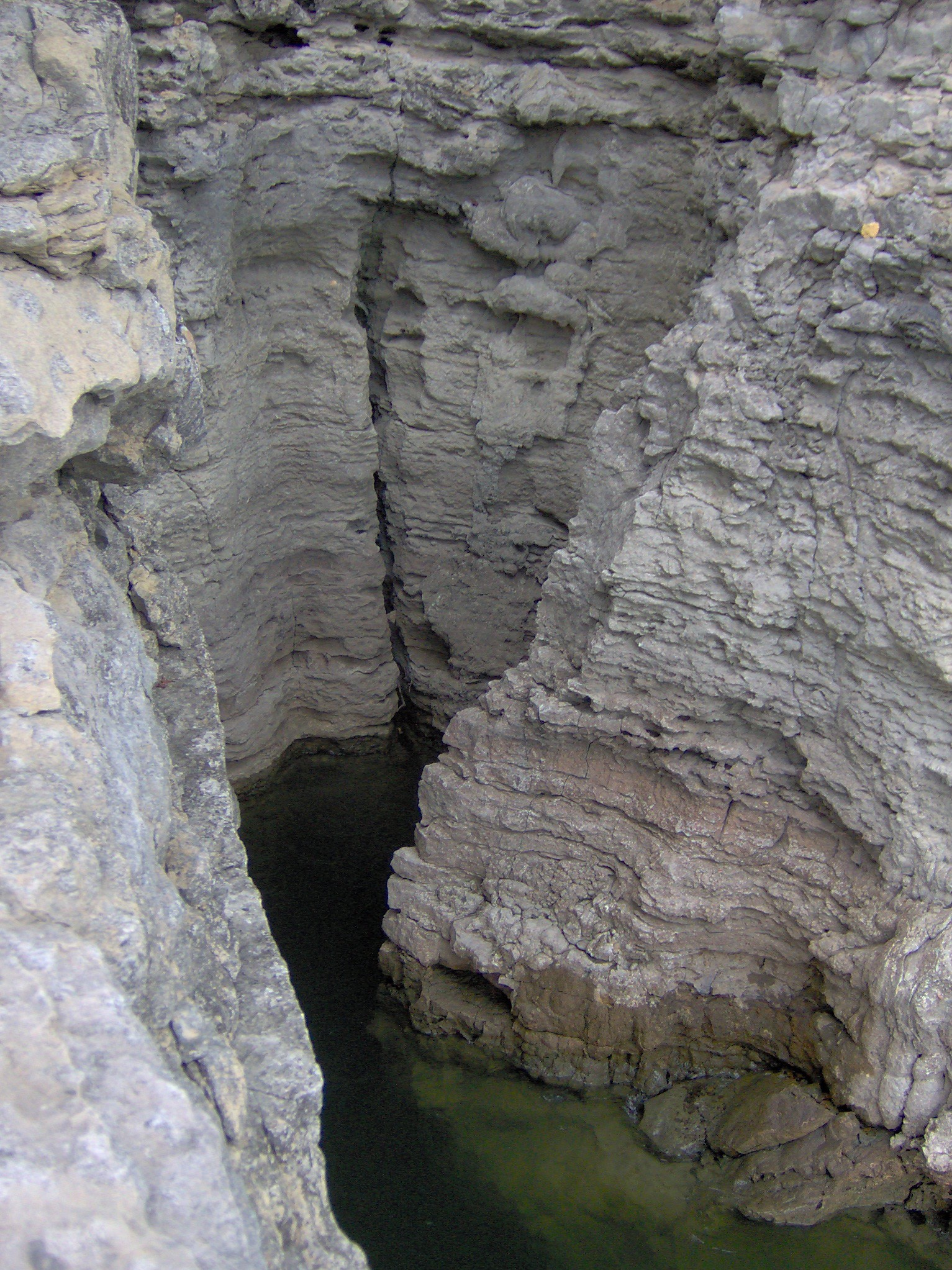
Limestone cliff near the primitive campground

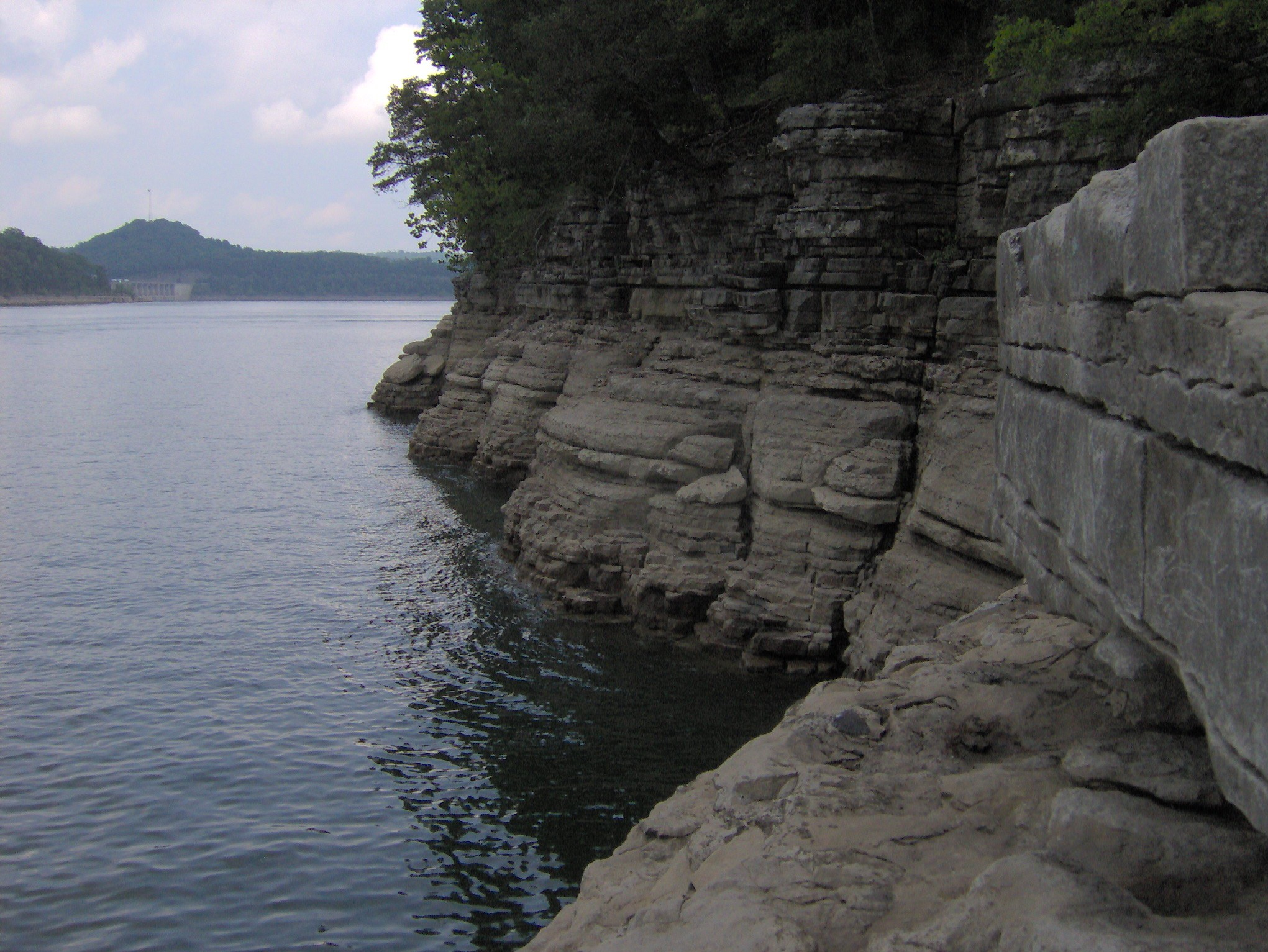
Limestone outcroppings near the campground
