= DeKalb County High School =

Public secondary school in Smithville, DeKalb, Tennessee

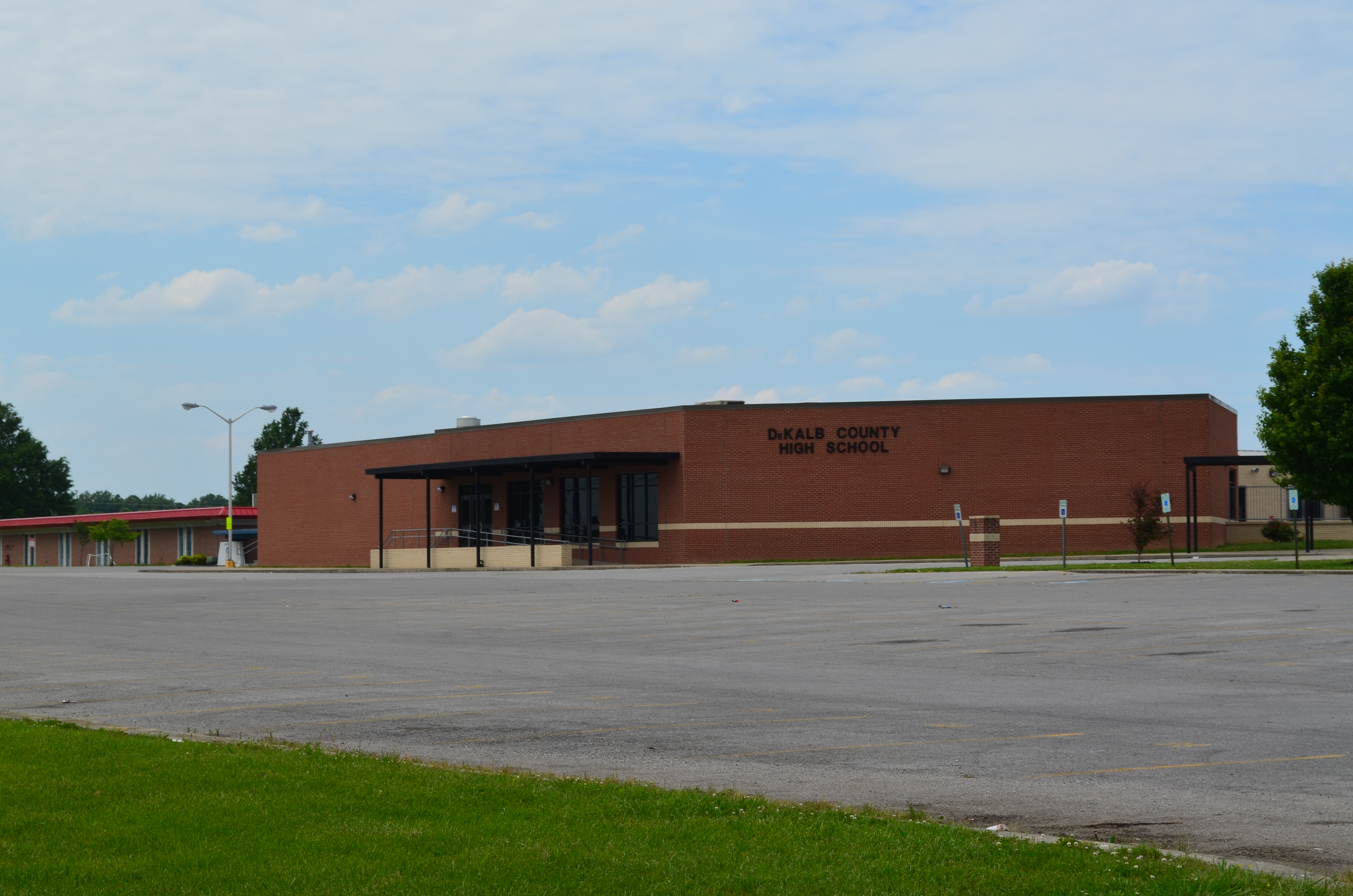

Location
- 1130 W. Broad Street; Smithville, DeKalb, Tennessee 37166; United States; 35.96877°N 85.85225°W

Information
- School type: Public secondary
- Established: 1963
- School district: DeKalb County Schools
- Superintendent: Patrick Cripps
- Principal: Bruce Curtis
- Grades: 9–12
- Enrollment: 780 (2025–26)
- Average class size: 20–30
- Language: English
- Hours in school day: 7
- Colors: Black and old gold
- Slogan: Tiger Pride
- Sports: Football, Baseball, Softball, Basketball, Soccer, Tennis, Golf, Cross Country
- Mascot: Tiger
- Team name: DeKalb County Fighting Tigers
- Rival: Livingston Academy, Cannon County High School, Smith County High School, Upperman High School
- Yearbook: The Tiger
- Communities served: Smithville, Dowelltown, Liberty, Alexandria, Temperance Hall
- Affiliations: Tennessee Secondary School Athletic Association
- Website: DeKalb County High School

DeKalb County High School (DCHS) is located in Smithville, Tennessee. It is the only high school in the county and serves grades 9–12 with an enrollment of 780 as of August 19, 2026. The school's mascot is a tiger and the school colors are black and gold. The principal is Bruce Curtis and the assistant principals are Seth Willoughby and Jenny Norris. The school is fed by DeKalb Middle School (6–8; located at the same complex as the high school) and DeKalb West School (K–8).

== Clubs ==
DCHS has a variety of clubs, including FFA, FBLA, FCCLA, HOSA, Jr. and Sr. Beta Club, SkillsUSA, CTE, a Chess Club, a Literature Club, a Science Club, and a Spanish Club. Other groups include the Student Council as well as a Color Guard and Marching Band known as the "Fighting Tiger Marching Band".

== Notable alumni ==
- Michael Hale – Member of the Tennessee House of Representatives
- Steven Jennings – Former Minor League Baseball player for Pittsburgh Pirates, New York Yankees, and Texas Rangers organizations; drafted in the 2nd round, 42nd overall, in the 2017 MLB draft
- Greg Tubbs – Former Major League Baseball player
