= Michael Hale =

American politician (born 1974)

Member of the Tennessee House of Representatives from the 40th district
- Incumbent
- Assumed office January 10, 2023
- Preceded by: Terri Lynn Weaver

Personal details
- Born: July 17, 1974 (age 52) DeKalb County, Tennessee, U.S.
- Party: Republican
- Spouse: Tara Webb
- Children: 3
- Education: John A. Gupton College (AA)
- Website: Campaign website

Michael Hale (born July 17, 1974) is an American politician. He serves as a Republican member for the 40th district of the Tennessee House of Representatives.

Hale graduated from DeKalb County High School in Smithville, Tennessee and earned an associate degree from John A. Gupton College. He announced his candidacy in the 2022 election for Tennessee's 40th house district in April 2022. Hale defeated seven-term incumbent representative Terri Lynn Weaver in the Republican primary, and went on to defeat Democrat Tom Cook in the November general election.

Hale, a member of the United Pentecostal Church, lives in DeKalb County with his wife Tara. They have three children.

In the midterm election in November 2026, Hale was re-elected to the state legislature.
