= Midway, DeKalb County, Tennessee =

Midway
- Unincorporated community
- Location within Tennessee Location within the United States
- Coordinates: 35°57′16″N 85°45′18″W
- Country: United States
- State: Tennessee
- County: DeKalb
- Elevation: 1,024 ft (312 m)
- Time zone: UTC-6 (Central (CST))
  - Summer (DST): UTC-5 (CDT)
- Area code: 615
- GNIS feature ID: 1313999

Midway is an unincorporated community in DeKalb County, Tennessee. Midway is located along U.S. Route 70 and State Route 26 3.3 miles (5.3 km) east of Smithville.
