= Harold Earthman =

American politician (1900–1987)

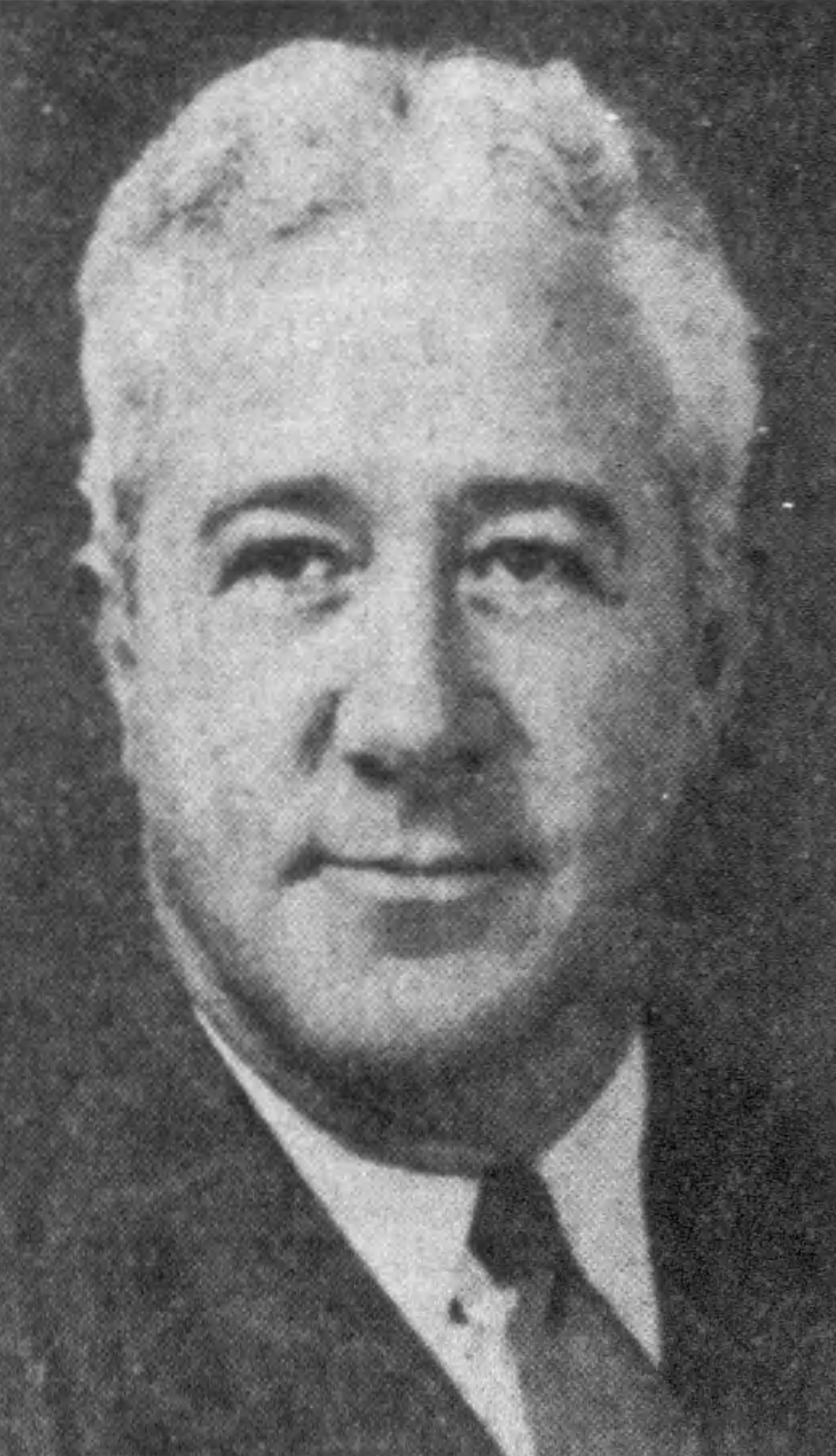

Member of the U.S. House of Representatives from Tennessee's 5th district
- In office January 3, 1945 – January 3, 1947
- Preceded by: Jim Nance McCord
- Succeeded by: Joe L. Evins

Member of the Tennessee House of Representatives
- In office 1931–1932

Personal details
- Born: April 13, 1900 Murfreesboro, Tennessee, U.S.
- Died: February 26, 1987 (aged 86) Murfreesboro, Tennessee, U.S.
- Party: Democratic
- Spouse: Mary Wilson Moore (m. 1920)
- Children: 4
- Parents: Vernon King Earthman (father); Virginia May Henderson (mother)
- Education: Southern Methodist University; University of Texas at Austin; Cumberland School of Law (LLB)
- Occupation: Lawyer; politician

Military service
- Allegiance: United States
- Branch: United States Army
- Rank: Private
- Unit: Student Army Training Corps
- Conflict: World War I

Harold Henderson "Doc" Earthman (April 13, 1900 – February 26, 1987) was an American politician and a U.S. Representative from Tennessee.

== Biography ==
Born in Murfreesboro, Tennessee, Earthman was the son of Vernon King Earthman, a physician, and his wife Virginia May Henderson Earthman. He attended the public schools, Webb School at Bell Buckle, Tennessee, Southern Methodist University at Dallas, Texas, and the University of Texas at Austin. He married Mary Wilson Moore in 1920, and they had four children: Harold, Mary, Virginia, and Ben.

== Career ==
During World War I, Earthman served in the United States Army as a private and was assigned to the Student Army Training Corps. After moving to Nashville, Tennessee, he engaged in the banking business from 1921 to 1925. Admitted to the bar in 1926, he commenced the practice of law in Murfreesboro, Tennessee, engaged in agricultural pursuits and was owner of Earthman Enterprises. He resumed the study of law and was graduated from Cumberland School of Law at Cumberland University, Lebanon, Tennessee, in 1927.

Earthman was a member of the Tennessee House of Representatives in 1931 and 1932. In the Tennessee House, he aligned with himself with Tennessee political boss E. H. Crump. He served as associate administrator of war bonds for the State of Tennessee from 1940 to 1946, as well as judge of Rutherford County, Tennessee from 1942 to 1945.

Elected as a Democrat to the Seventy-ninth Congress, Earthman served in that capacity from January 3, 1945, to January 3, 1947, representing Tennessee's 5th congressional district. He sought renomination in 1946, but lost in the primary to Joe L. Evins. After leaving Congress, he resumed the practice of law and pursued business interests, establishing the first self-service laundry in Murfreesboro.

== Death ==
Earthman died on February 26, 1987, in Murfreesboro. He is interred there at Evergreen Cemetery.

U.S. House of Representatives
| Preceded by Jim Nance McCord | Member of the U.S. House of Representatives from Tennessee's 5th congressional district 1945–1947 | Succeeded by Joe L. Evins |
