= Dan Evins =

American entrepreneur and founder of Cracker Barrel

- Born: October 11, 1935; Smithville, Tennessee, U.S.
- Died: January 14, 2012 (aged 76); Lebanon, Tennessee, U.S.
- Education: Auburn University
- Occupation: Businessman
- Known for: Cracker Barrel founder
- Spouse(s): Donna Singleton Evins, Margarita Pereyra Evins
- Children: Daina Warren, Meacham Evins, Kate Page, Betsy Jennings, Joe L Evins ll
- Relatives: James Edgar Evins(paternal grandfather); Joe L. Evins(paternal uncle)

Danny Wood Evins (October 11, 1935 – January 14, 2012) was an American entrepreneur and founder of Cracker Barrel, a Southern-themed restaurant chain.

== Early life ==
Evins was born in Smithville, Tennessee, on October 11, 1935, the youngest child of Estelle McCartney and William Jackson Evins. As a child he graduated from Castle Heights Military Academy in Lebanon, Tennessee. He enlisted in the US Marine Corps and attended Auburn University.

== Career ==
Evins also worked as an aide for his uncle, U.S. Rep. Joe L. Evins, before taking a position with his family's oil company.

Evins founded Cracker Barrel in 1969 while he was working for Shell Oil. He opened the first restaurant in Lebanon, Tennessee, on Tennessee State Route 109. He borrowed $40,000 to construct the first Cracker Barrel, which turned a profit just one month after opening.

Evins was the chief executive officer (CEO) of Cracker Barrel from its founding in 1969 to 2001, and after a shareholder exodus due to his discriminatory policies, he was chairman of the board from 2001 until his retirement in 2004. During this time he was also served as chairman of the board of directors for Castle Heights Military Academy while his son was enrolled in the school.

In 1998, Evins led the drive by Cracker Barrel to purchase and restore the Mitchell House in Lebanon, Tennessee. The home had been a dormitory for elementary age students while Castle Heights Military Academy had been operating. The company spent two million dollars to restore the home and make it the company's corporate office.

== Views and retirement ==
During the early 1990s, Evins instituted an official company policy prohibiting the hiring of openly gay individuals. Following backlash from large shareholders from progressive areas, such as the New York City Employee Retirement System, who threatened to vote out the entirety of upper management, the company reversed the policy.

In July 2001, shareholders replaced Evins as CEO with Michael A. Woodhouse, who at the time was serving as the company's chief operating officer. Evins maintained his position as chairman of the board. The same year, the board voted unanimously to add sexual orientation to Cracker Barrel's non-discrimination policy, with the term officially being added the following year.

A few months later, Evins announced his retirement as chairman of the company's board. At the company's 2004 annual meeting, shareholders voted to reelect Michael A. Woodhouse as CEO, while also granting him Evins' title as chairman of the board, effectively merging the roles.

By January 2012, Cracker Barrel had more than 67,000 employees working in more than 600 restaurants in 42 U.S. states.

== Personal life ==
Evins was married three times. His third wife was Margarita Pereyra Evins, who died just a few short months before Evins' death in January 2012. Through his marriage to Pereyra, Evins was stepfather to Alberto "Bobby" Rodriguez and Elvia Rodriguez Klym.

On January 14, 2012, Evins died from bladder cancer at his daughter's home in Lebanon, Tennessee, at the age of 76.
