= Terri Lynn Weaver =

American politician (born 1957)

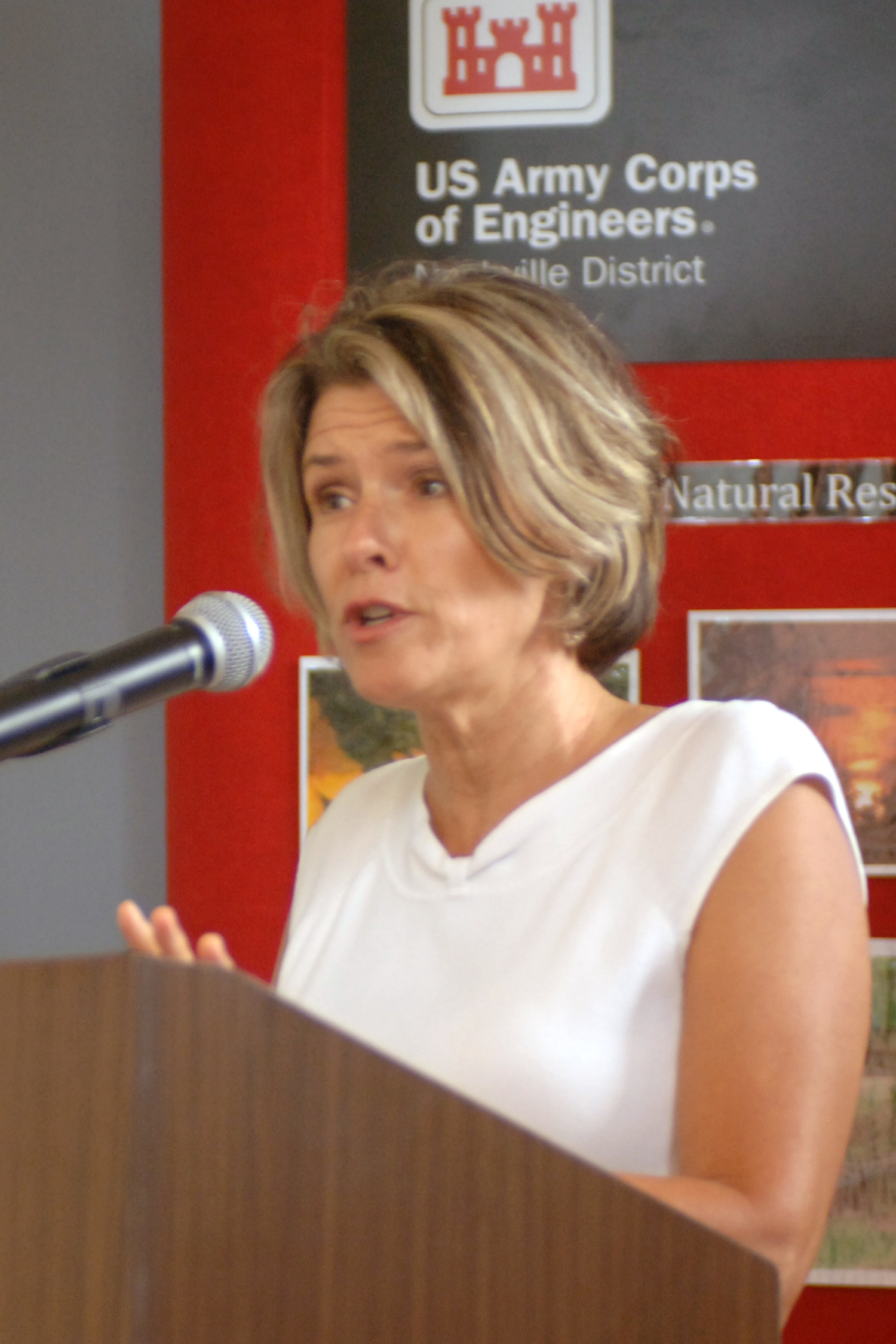
- Weaver in 2012

Member of the Tennessee House of Representatives from the 40th district
- In office January 13, 2009 – January 10, 2023
- Preceded by: Frank Buck
- Succeeded by: Michael Hale

Personal details
- Born: September 19, 1957 (age 69) Mansfield, Ohio, U.S.
- Party: Republican
- Spouse: Mike Weaver
- Children: 1
- Website: House website

Military service
- Allegiance: Tennessee
- Branch/service: Tennessee State Guard
- Rank: Second lieutenant

Terri Lynn Weaver (born September 19, 1957) is an American politician who was a member of the Tennessee House of Representatives from 2009 to 2023. She represented the 40th district, which is composed of Smith, Trousdale, most of DeKalb, and part of Sumner counties.

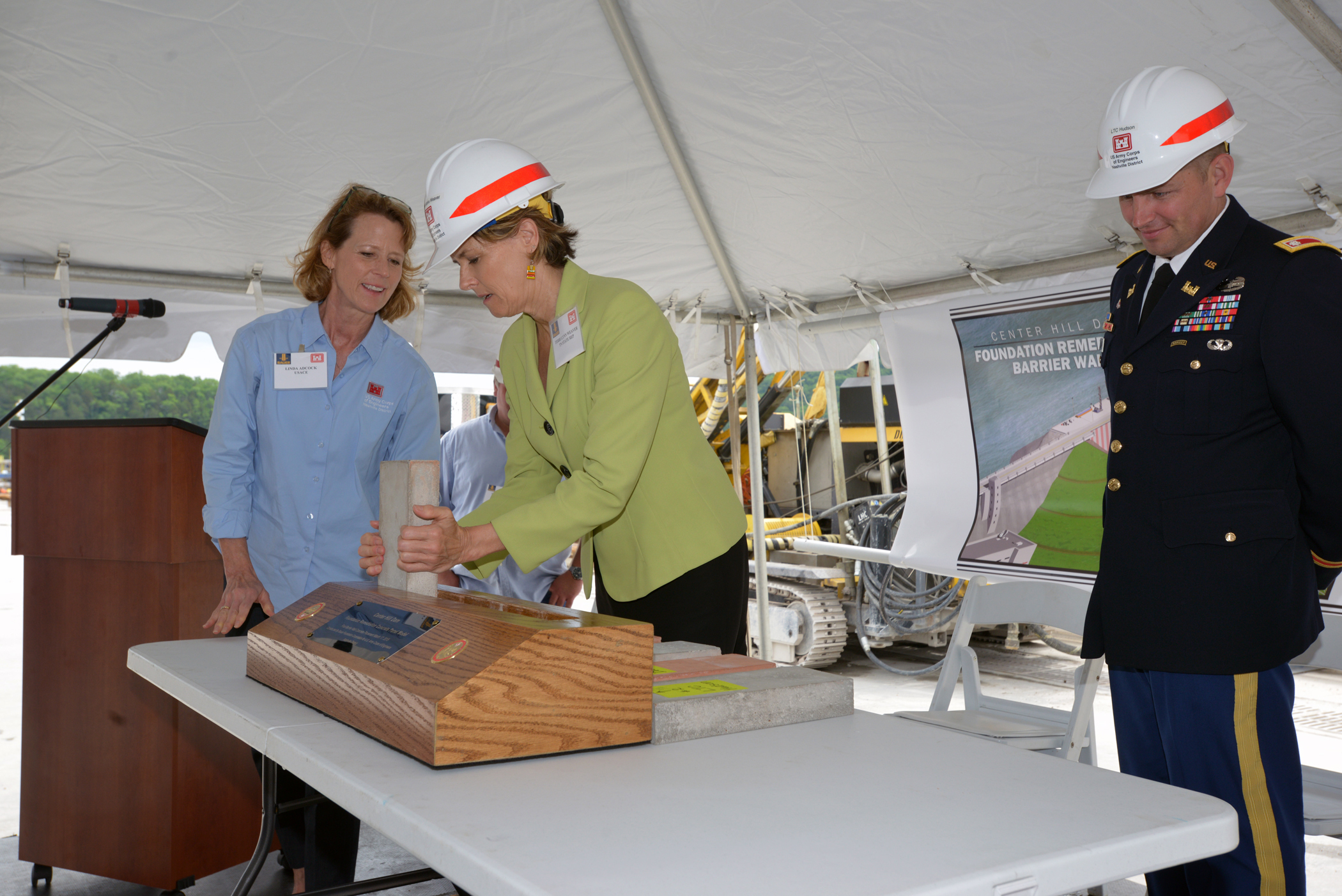
State Representative Weaver (center) in Lancaster, Tennessee.

== Biography ==
=== Early life and career ===
Weaver was born in Mansfield, Ohio. She moved to Dallas, Texas, with her aunt in the mid-1970s, where she played rhythm guitar in a local band. On June 23, 1979, she married Mike Weaver.

=== Tennessee House of Representatives ===
Weaver ran a campaign against incumbent Rep. Frank Buck (D) in 2006. Though Rep. Buck retained his seat in the House he later announced he would not run again. Weaver was able to run another campaign the following election in 2008 and was elected to the 40th district of the Tennessee House of Representatives from 2008, filling Buck's vacant seat. She serves in the 106th General Assembly as a member of the House Agriculture Committee, the House Children & Family Affairs Committee, the House Education Committee, the House K-12 Subcommittee, and the House Domestic Relations Subcommittee.

Weaver was indirectly responsible for the surprise 2009 Tennessee House of Representatives election of TNGA House Speaker Kent Williams, R-Elizabethton (and concurrently, the defeat of Rep. Jason Mumpower, R-Bristol) as Weaver's first vote within the House of Representatives sided with the Tennessee House Democrats on the recess motion prior to the January 14, 2009, vote for the Speaker of the House. The Tennessee House Republicans tried to block the recess, but lost on a 50–49 vote.

Weaver supported a Tennessee law that allows prosecutors to charge women with criminal assault if they use narcotics during pregnancy and the fetus or newborn is found "addicted to or harmed by the drug". The bill passed and Governor Haslam signed it into law. In 2016, the Legislature refused to renew it.

On September 13, 2016, Weaver was one of just two House Representatives who was opposed to the expulsion of fellow lawmaker Jeremy Durham over allegations of sexual harassment, campaign finance violations, and tax evasion. Sixteen House members abstained.

In February 2017, Weaver introduced a bill that would classify children born through artificial insemination as illegitimate, even if both parents are married and consent to the insemination. Weaver defended the bill in a subsequent Facebook post, claiming it was intended only to repeal a statute that the state Attorney General had deemed unconstitutional. However, in reviewing Weaver's argument, Snopes concluded that it rests on a "fairly significant misreading" of the Attorney General's views and existing Tennessee law. The bill did not pass.

Weaver served seven two-year terms as state representative. In the August 2022 Republican primary, she lost her reelection bid to political newcomer Michael Hale. Hale went on to win in the general election.

=== 2021 storming of the United States Capitol ===
Weaver traveled to Washington, D.C., on January 6, 2021, to protest the results of the Electoral College. She attended the event that led to the 2021 storming of the US Capitol. She said that she was "in the thick of it" but "there wasn't any violence going on here." She did not state whether or not she had entered the Capitol. The United States Capitol was breached and the incident led to five deaths.

Weaver said that members of antifa stormed the U.S. Capitol. The FBI stated there is no evidence antifa was involved in the attacks. Later that night she said it had been an "epic and historic day." Weaver also referred to those who stormed the Capitol as "patriots".

== Community involvement ==
Weaver was previously chairman of Farm Bureau and is currently Vice Chairman of the Smith County Republican Party and Chairman of Smith County Republican Women. She is also a member of the Smith County Chamber of Commerce, the local Rotary Club, and the National Rifle Association of America. Her musical talent lends her involvement as Chairman of the Lancaster Independence Day Parade and Host Musician of the Annual Christmas Eve Service. Weaver is a second lieutenant in the Tennessee State Guard.
