= Smithville, Tennessee =

- City
- Smithville Watertower

- Location of Smithville in DeKalb County, Tennessee.
- Coordinates: 35°57′26″N 85°49′15″W
- Country: United States
- State: Tennessee
- County: DeKalb
- Founded: 1838
- Incorporated: 1843
- Named for: Samuel Granville Smith, local politician

Government
  - Type: Mayor-Aldermanic

Area
  - Total: 5.85 sq mi (15.16 km^{2})
  - Land: 5.85 sq mi (15.16 km^{2})
  - Water: 0 sq mi (0.00 km^{2})
- Elevation: 1,037 ft (316 m)

Population (2020)
  - Total: 5,004
  - Density: 854.8/sq mi (330.05/km^{2})
- Time zone: UTC-6 (Central (CST))
  - Summer (DST): UTC-5 (CDT)
- ZIP code: 37166
- Area code: 615
- FIPS code: 47-69320
- GNIS feature ID: 1313778
- Website: smithvillecityhall.com

Smithville is a city in DeKalb County, Tennessee, United States. The population was 5,004 at the 2020 census, up from 3,994 at the 2010 census. It is the county seat of DeKalb County. Smithville is home to the Smithville Fiddler's Jamboree, which it has hosted annually since 1972.

== Geography ==
Smithville is located in central DeKalb County at 35°57′26″N 85°49′15″W (35.957191, -85.820756). U.S. Route 70 passes through the town as Broad Street, leading east 21 miles (34 km) to Sparta and northwest 36 miles (58 km) to Lebanon. Tennessee State Route 56 (Congress Boulevard) crosses US 70 a few blocks southeast of the center of town and leads north 13 miles (21 km) to Interstate 40 at Silver Point and 19 miles (31 km) south to McMinnville. Cookeville is 28 miles (45 km) to the northeast, Murfreesboro is 40 miles (64 km) to the west-southwest, and Nashville is 66 miles (106 km) to the west-northwest.

According to the United States Census Bureau, the city has a total area of 5.9 square miles (15.3 km^{2}), all land.

=== Climate ===
Climate data for Smithville 2 SE, Tennessee (1991–2020 normals, extremes 1971–present)
| Month | Jan | Feb | Mar | Apr | May | Jun | Jul | Aug | Sep | Oct | Nov | Dec | Year |
|---|---|---|---|---|---|---|---|---|---|---|---|---|---|
| Record high °F (°C) | 76 (24) | 78 (26) | 85 (29) | 90 (32) | 92 (33) | 105 (41) | 104 (40) | 102 (39) | 99 (37) | 95 (35) | 85 (29) | 76 (24) | 105 (41) |
| Mean daily maximum °F (°C) | 47.2 (8.4) | 51.8 (11.0) | 60.3 (15.7) | 70.2 (21.2) | 77.9 (25.5) | 84.8 (29.3) | 87.7 (30.9) | 87.2 (30.7) | 81.8 (27.7) | 71.8 (22.1) | 60.0 (15.6) | 50.9 (10.5) | 69.3 (20.7) |
| Daily mean °F (°C) | 36.4 (2.4) | 39.8 (4.3) | 47.4 (8.6) | 56.2 (13.4) | 65.2 (18.4) | 73.0 (22.8) | 76.6 (24.8) | 75.4 (24.1) | 69.0 (20.6) | 57.5 (14.2) | 46.7 (8.2) | 39.7 (4.3) | 56.9 (13.8) |
| Mean daily minimum °F (°C) | 25.5 (−3.6) | 27.9 (−2.3) | 34.5 (1.4) | 42.3 (5.7) | 52.5 (11.4) | 61.3 (16.3) | 65.5 (18.6) | 63.6 (17.6) | 56.3 (13.5) | 43.3 (6.3) | 33.3 (0.7) | 28.4 (−2.0) | 44.5 (6.9) |
| Record low °F (°C) | −24 (−31) | −17 (−27) | 0 (−18) | 18 (−8) | 27 (−3) | 38 (3) | 46 (8) | 44 (7) | 29 (−2) | 21 (−6) | 9 (−13) | −7 (−22) | −24 (−31) |
| Average precipitation inches (mm) | 4.92 (125) | 5.07 (129) | 5.73 (146) | 4.99 (127) | 4.87 (124) | 5.14 (131) | 5.18 (132) | 3.92 (100) | 4.03 (102) | 3.28 (83) | 4.15 (105) | 5.69 (145) | 56.97 (1,447) |
| Average snowfall inches (cm) | 1.1 (2.8) | 1.1 (2.8) | 0.3 (0.76) | 0.0 (0.0) | 0.0 (0.0) | 0.0 (0.0) | 0.0 (0.0) | 0.0 (0.0) | 0.0 (0.0) | 0.0 (0.0) | 0.0 (0.0) | 0.6 (1.5) | 3.1 (7.9) |
| Average precipitation days (≥ 0.01 in) | 13.6 | 12.9 | 13.4 | 11.7 | 12.7 | 11.9 | 12.0 | 9.6 | 8.8 | 9.6 | 10.2 | 13.7 | 140.1 |
| Average snowy days (≥ 0.1 in) | 0.9 | 0.9 | 0.3 | 0.0 | 0.0 | 0.0 | 0.0 | 0.0 | 0.0 | 0.0 | 0.0 | 0.6 | 2.7 |
Source: NOAA

== Demographics ==
Historical population
| Census | Pop. | Note | %± |
|---|---|---|---|
| 1890 | 572 | | — |
| 1920 | 687 | | — |
| 1930 | 886 | | 29.0% |
| 1940 | 919 | | 3.7% |
| 1950 | 1,558 | | 69.5% |
| 1960 | 2,348 | | 50.7% |
| 1970 | 2,997 | | 27.6% |
| 1980 | 3,839 | | 28.1% |
| 1990 | 3,791 | | −1.3% |
| 2000 | 3,994 | | 5.4% |
| 2010 | 4,530 | | 13.4% |
| 2020 | 5,004 | | 10.5% |

=== 2020 census ===
As of the 2020 census, Smithville had a population of 5,004, with 1,989 households and 1,090 families residing in the city.

The median age was 37.8 years; 24.9% of residents were under the age of 18 and 18.1% of residents were 65 years of age or older. For every 100 females there were 88.9 males, and for every 100 females age 18 and over there were 82.4 males age 18 and over.

There were 1,989 households in Smithville, of which 33.6% had children under the age of 18 living in them. Of all households, 37.6% were married-couple households, 18.5% were households with a male householder and no spouse or partner present, and 36.6% were households with a female householder and no spouse or partner present. About 32.1% of all households were made up of individuals and 16.0% had someone living alone who was 65 years of age or older.

There were 2,145 housing units, of which 7.3% were vacant. The homeowner vacancy rate was 1.6% and the rental vacancy rate was 5.3%.

89.7% of residents lived in urban areas, while 10.3% lived in rural areas.

Racial composition as of the 2020 census
| Race | Number | Percent |
|---|---|---|
| White | 4,087 | 81.7% |
| Black or African American | 101 | 2.0% |
| American Indian and Alaska Native | 32 | 0.6% |
| Asian | 37 | 0.7% |
| Native Hawaiian and Other Pacific Islander | 5 | 0.1% |
| Some other race | 379 | 7.6% |
| Two or more races | 363 | 7.3% |
| Hispanic or Latino (of any race) | 650 | 13.0% |

=== 2000 census ===
As of the census of 2000, there was a population of 3,994, with 1,675 households and 1,065 families residing in the city. The population density was 679.4 inhabitants per square mile (262.3/km^{2}). There were 1,837 housing units at an average density of 312.5 per square mile (120.7/km^{2}). The racial makeup of the city was 94.34% White, 2.73% African American, 0.15% Native American, 0.10% Asian, 1.65% from other races, and 1.03% from two or more races. Hispanic or Latino of any race were 4.06% of the population.

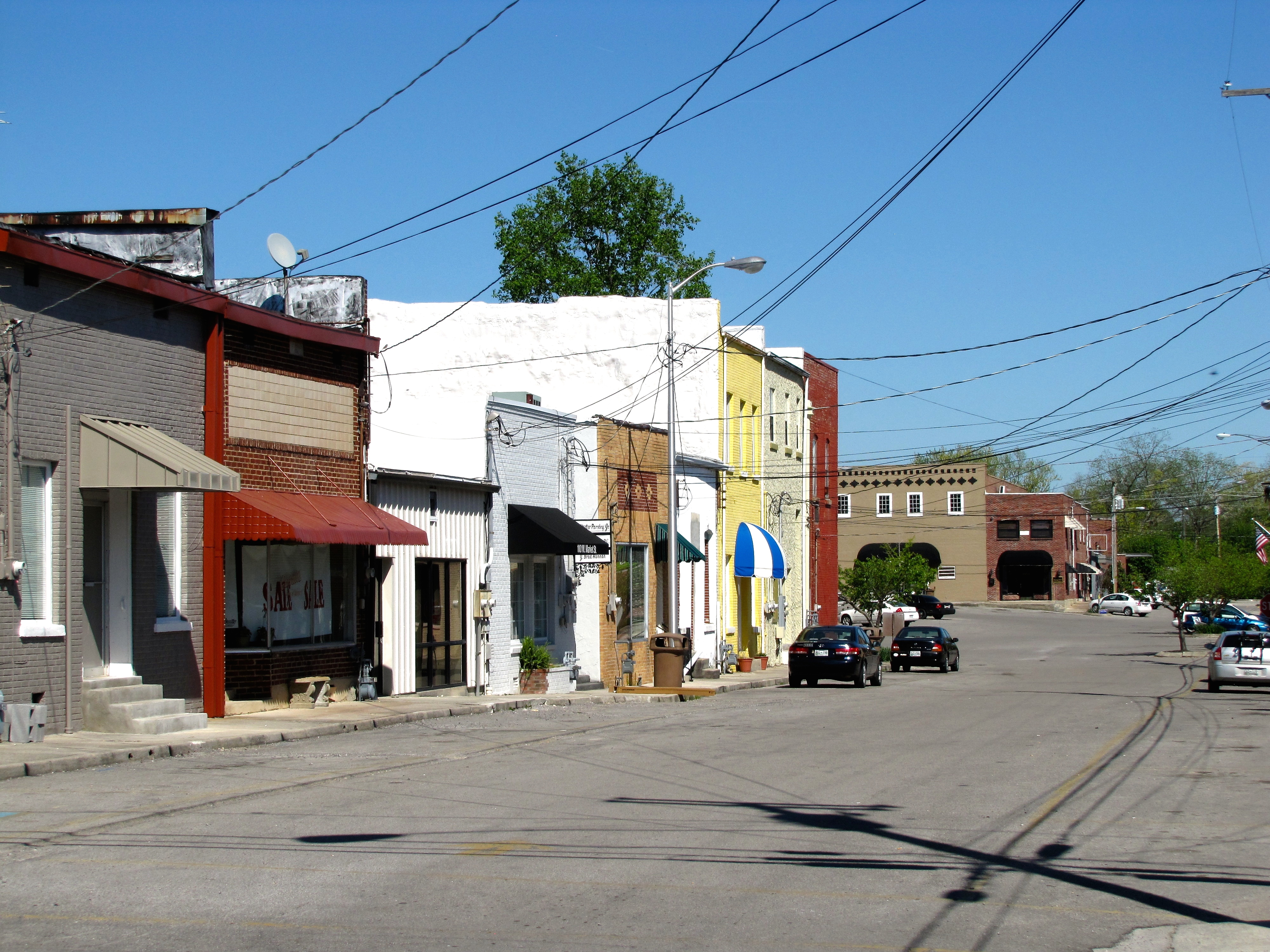
Market Street

There were 1,675 households, out of which 27.9% had children under the age of 18 living with them, 43.0% were married couples living together, 16.9% had a female householder with no husband present, and 36.4% were non-families. 33.4% of all households were made up of individuals, and 15.1% had someone living alone who was 65 years of age or older. The average household size was 2.27 and the average family size was 2.85.

In the city, the population was spread out, with 22.9% under the age of 18, 8.9% from 18 to 24, 26.4% from 25 to 44, 22.3% from 45 to 64, and 19.6% who were 65 years of age or older. The median age was 38 years. For every 100 females, there were 83.2 males. For every 100 females age 18 and over, there were 78.0 males.

The median income for a household in the city was $22,482, and the median income for a family was $30,179. Males had a median income of $29,231 versus $20,705 for females. The per capita income for the city was $16,854. About 15.4% of families and 22.2% of the population were below the poverty line, including 28.3% of those under age 18 and 25.8% of those age 65 or over.

== In popular culture ==
Smithville is referred to by a local-boy Marine talking to a girl and pointing to labels on a map during a dance hall scene, 17 minutes into the 1949 World War II John Wayne film, Sands of Iwo Jima, where it is mentioned, apart from everybody in his family being related to much of Tennessee, as being famous for "corn tobacco" and "more fertilizer than any other place in the world".

== Fiddler's Jamboree ==
Smithville Fiddler's Jamboree & Crafts Festival
- Genre: Bluegrass music, old-time music
- Years active: 1972-present
- Attendance: 100,000+
- Website: www.smithvilletn.com

Joe L. Evins helped start the world-famous Smithville Fiddler's Jamboree & Crafts Festival. The first Jamboree was held in July 1972 on a stage built on the steps of the DeKalb County Courthouse, and has been held there annually on the weekend nearest to July 4. The first Jamboree attracted 714 musicians from 16 states, and was attended by an estimated audience of 8,000. Present day audiences are estimated to be well over 100,000 from all over the U.S., and many from abroad.

== Notable people ==
- Bob Allen — Major League Baseball pitcher
- John Anderson — country music singer
- Dan Evins — Founder of Cracker Barrel
- James Edgar Evins — Tennessee state senator, mayor of Smithville for 16 years
- Joe L. Evins — U.S. representative
- Alan Jackson — country music singer; former resident
- Greg Tubbs — Major League Baseball Player, Cincinnati Reds, 1993
- Lonnie Mack — pioneering blues-rock guitar soloist lived close by for many years and died here
- Aaron Tippin — country music singer
- Dottie West —American country music singer and songwriter

== Gallery ==
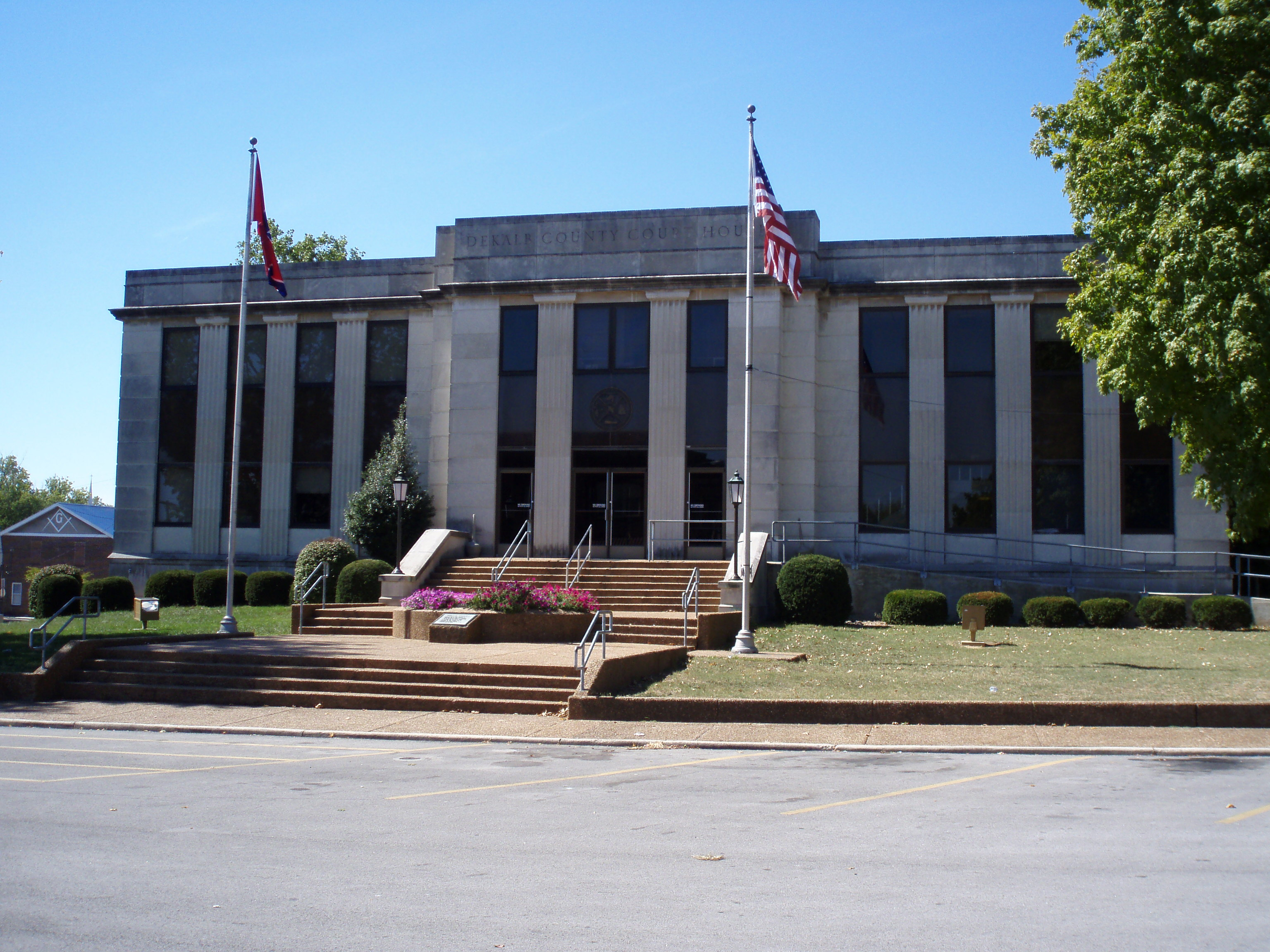
Dekalb County Courthouse in Smithville, Tennessee

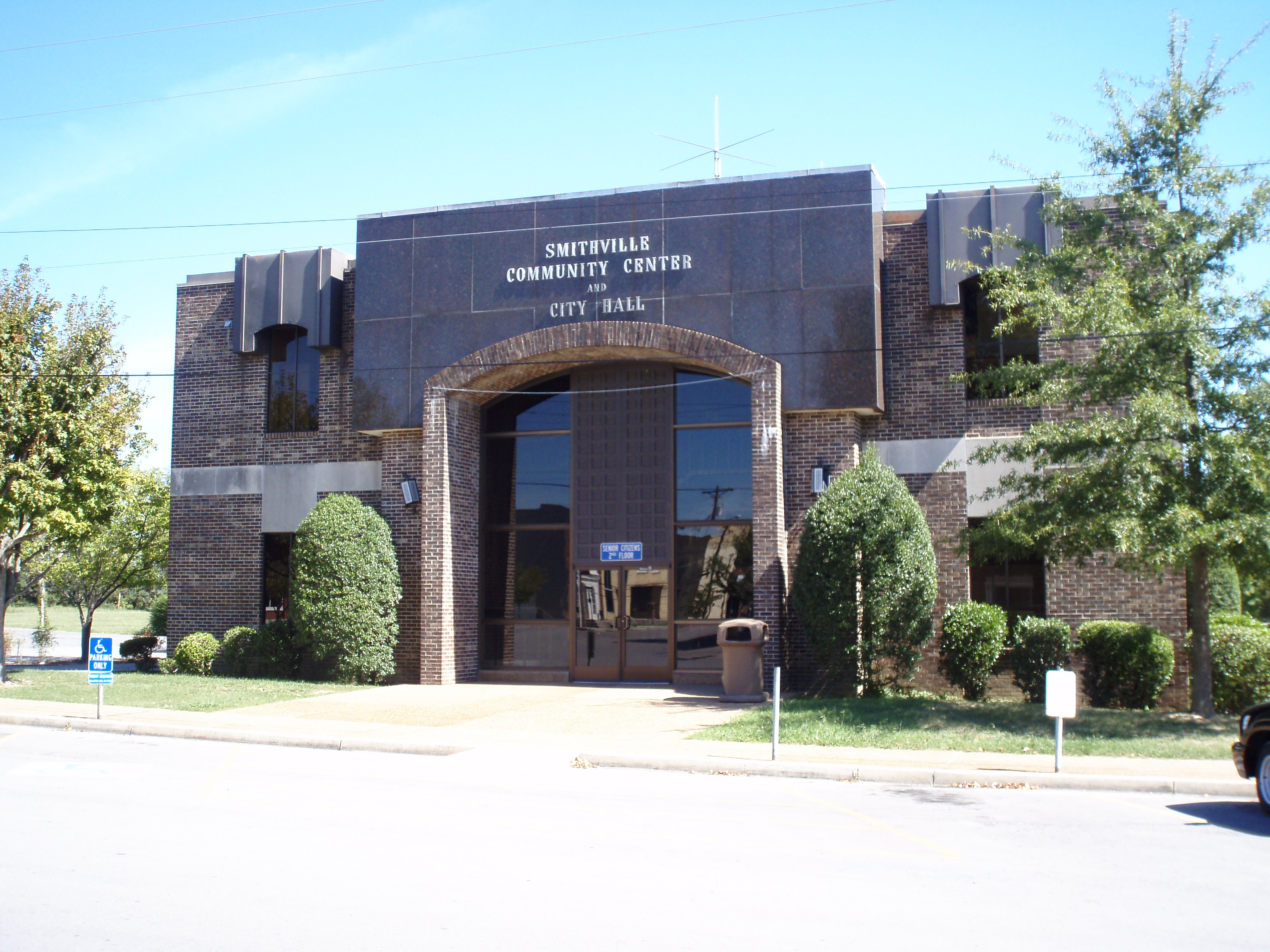
Smithville City Hall

== See also ==
- List of bluegrass music festivals
