= DeKalb County, Tennessee =

County in Tennessee, United States

- County
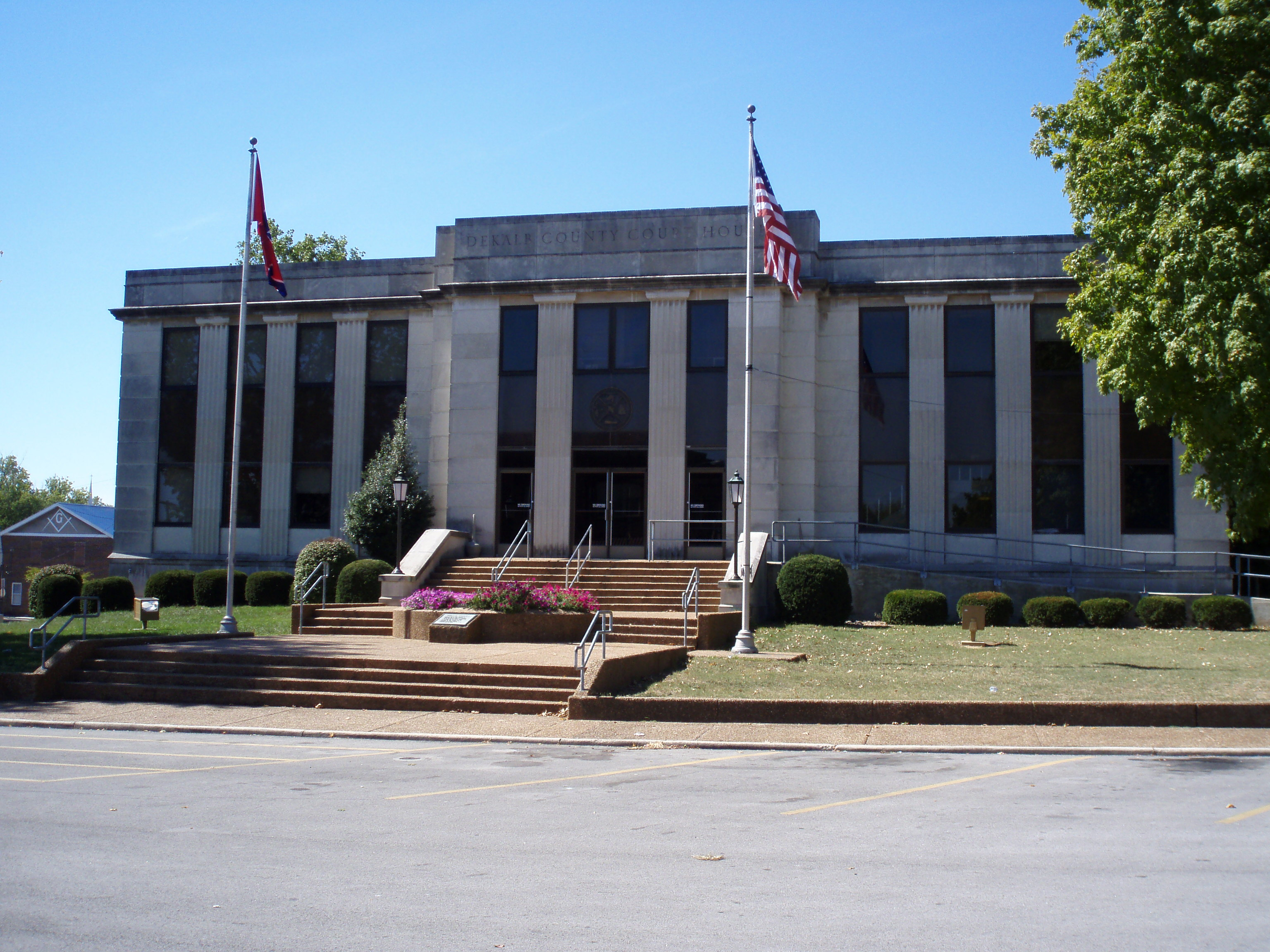
- DeKalb County Courthouse in Smithville

- Location within the U.S. state of Tennessee
- Coordinates: 35°59′N 85°50′W
- Country: United States
- State: Tennessee
- Founded: 1837
- Named for: Johann de Kalb
- Seat: Smithville
- Largest city: Smithville

Area
  - Total: 329 sq mi (850 km^{2})
  - Land: 304 sq mi (790 km^{2})
  - Water: 25 sq mi (65 km^{2}) 7.5%

Population (2020)
  - Total: 20,080
  - Estimate (2025): 21,873 ▲
  - Density: 62/sq mi (24/km^{2})
- Time zone: UTC−6 (Central)
  - Summer (DST): UTC−5 (CDT)
- Congressional district: 6th
- Website: dekalbtennessee.com

DeKalb County is a county located in the U.S. state of Tennessee. As of the 2020 census, the population was 20,080. Its county seat is Smithville. The county was created by the General Assembly of Tennessee on December 2, 1837, and was named for Revolutionary War hero Major General Johann de Kalb.

== History ==
DeKalb County was formed in 1837. It was the site of several saltpeter mines, the main ingredient of gunpowder obtained by leaching the earth from several local caves. Overall Cave was named for Abraham Overall who moved from Luray, Virginia, and settled near the present site of Liberty in 1805. He reportedly had many slaves and owned a large plantation on which Overall Cave is located. Two saltpeter leaching vats in the cave may date from the War of 1812, although this area was mined again during the Civil War. Other caves in DeKalb County that were mined for saltpeter include Avant Cave, located near Dowelltown, Indian Grave Point Cave, located in the Dry Creek Valley, and Temperance Saltpeter Cave, located near Temperance Hall.

Unlike most of generally pro-Confederate Middle Tennessee, DeKalb County was seriously divided during the Civil War. In Tennessee's Ordinance of Secession referendum on June 8, 1861, DeKalb County voted to secede only by a margin of 833 to 642, which constituted the smallest margin by any county voting to secede. Earlier on February 9, 1861, DeKalb County voters had voted against holding a secession convention by a margin of 1,009 to 336.

== Geography ==
There is a sizable northeastern portion of DeKalb County inaccessible by road without driving through neighboring Putnam County, commonly known as the Austin Bottom. This area includes the Williams Crossroads where Austin Lake Road and Sunny Point Road meet the main Austin Bottom Road. The Austin Bottom area is one big peninsula in Center Hill Lake separated from the rest of DeKalb County by the main channel along the Caney Fork along with the embayments of Mine Lick Creek and the Falling Water River.

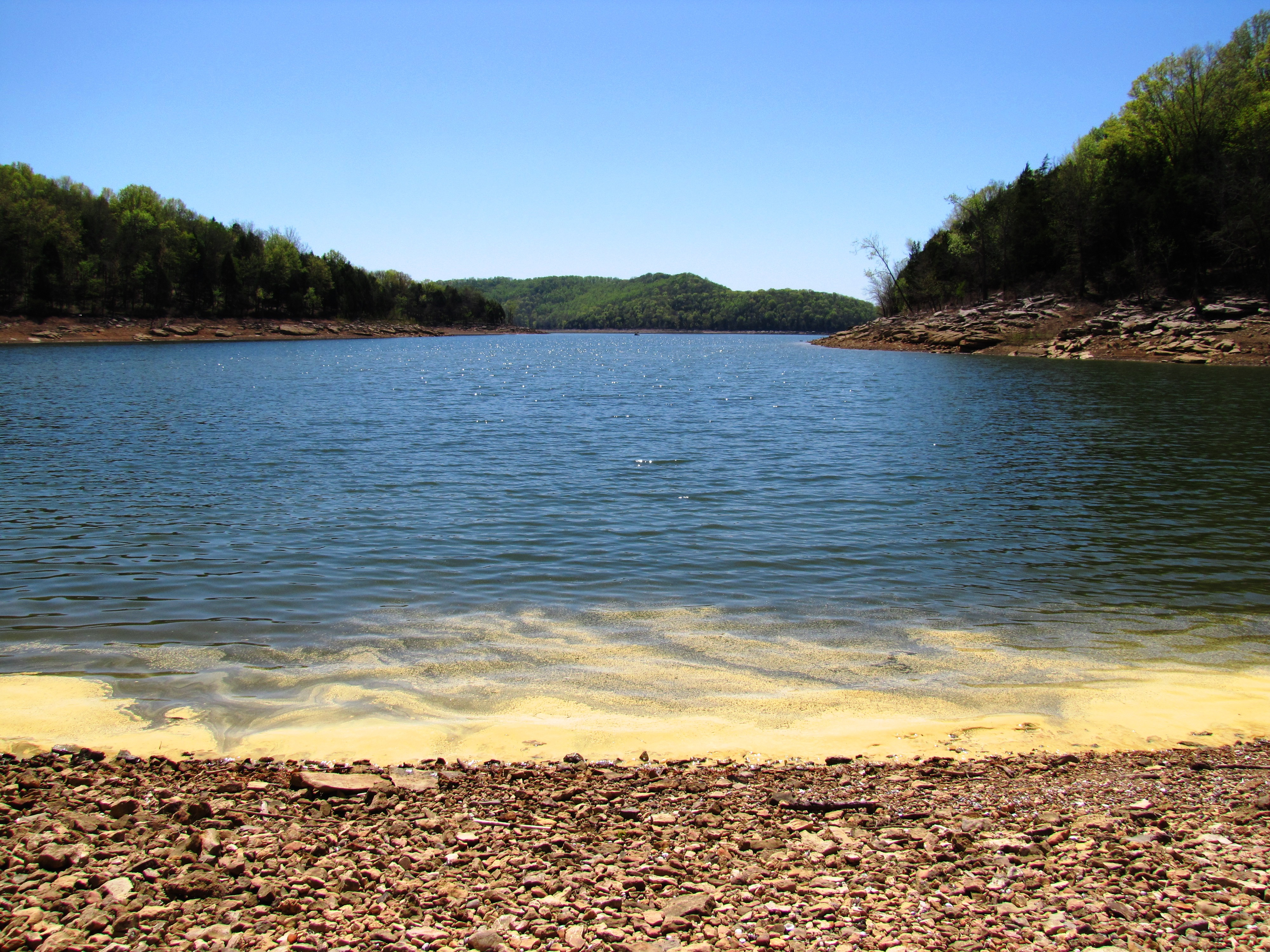
Center Hill Lake at Edgar Evins State Park

According to the U.S. Census Bureau, the county has a total area of 329 square miles (850 km^{2}), of which 304 square miles (790 km^{2}) is land and 25 square miles (65 km^{2}) (7.5%) is water.

=== Adjacent counties ===
- Putnam County (northeast)
- White County (east)
- Warren County (south)
- Cannon County (southwest)
- Wilson County (west)
- Smith County (northwest)

=== State protected areas ===
- Edgar Evins State Park
- Pea Ridge Wildlife Management Area

== Demographics ==
Historical population
Census	Pop.	Note	%±
1840	5,868		—
1850	8,016		36.6%
1860	10,573		31.9%
1870	11,425		8.1%
1880	14,813		29.7%
1890	15,650		5.7%
1900	16,460		5.2%
1910	15,434		−6.2%
1920	15,370		−0.4%
1930	14,213		−7.5%
1940	14,588		2.6%
1950	11,680		−19.9%
1960	10,774		−7.8%
1970	11,151		3.5%
1980	13,589		21.9%
1990	14,360		5.7%
2000	17,423		21.3%
2010	18,723		7.5%
2020	20,080		7.2%
2025 (est.)	21,873	▲	8.9%
U.S. Decennial Census; 1790-1960 1900-1990; 1990-2000 2010-2014

=== Racial and ethnic composition ===
DeKalb County, Tennessee – Racial and ethnic composition Note: the US Census treats Hispanic/Latino as an ethnic category. This table excludes Latinos from the racial categories and assigns them to a separate category. Hispanics/Latinos may be of any race.
Race / ethnicity (NH = Non-Hispanic)	Pop 1980	Pop 1990	Pop 2000	Pop 2010	Pop 2020	% 1980	% 1990	% 2000	% 2010	% 2020
White alone (NH)	13,210	14,049	16,338	16,980	17,526	97.21%	97.83%	93.77%	90.69%	87.28%
Black or African American alone (NH)	265	215	249	233	234	1.95%	1.50%	1.43%	1.24%	1.17%
Native American or Alaska Native alone (NH)	9	19	45	35	44	0.07%	0.13%	0.26%	0.19%	0.22%
Asian alone (NH)	14	12	24	48	76	0.10%	0.08%	0.14%	0.26%	0.38%
Native Hawaiian or Pacific Islander alone (NH)	x	x	3	2	5	x	x	0.02%	0.01%	0.02%
Other race alone (NH)	11	3	9	16	53	0.08%	0.02%	0.05%	0.09%	0.26%
Mixed race or Multiracial (NH)	x	x	122	170	693	x	x	0.70%	0.91%	3.45%
Hispanic or Latino (any race)	80	62	633	1,239	1,449	0.59%	0.43%	3.63%	6.62%	7.22%
Total	13,589	14,360	17,423	18,723	20,080	100.00%	100.00%	100.00%	100.00%	100.00%

=== 2020 census ===
As of the 2020 census, there were 20,080 people, 8,061 households, and 5,401 families residing in the county. The median age was 43.1 years; 22.0% of residents were under the age of 18 and 19.8% of residents were 65 years of age or older. For every 100 females there were 99.0 males, and for every 100 females age 18 and over there were 96.2 males age 18 and over.

There were 8,061 households in the county, of which 29.4% had children under the age of 18 living in them. Of all households, 49.6% were married-couple households, 18.9% were households with a male householder and no spouse or partner present, and 25.0% were households with a female householder and no spouse or partner present. About 27.1% of all households were made up of individuals and 12.9% had someone living alone who was 65 years of age or older.

There were 9,867 housing units, of which 18.3% were vacant. Among occupied housing units, 71.7% were owner-occupied and 28.3% were renter-occupied. The homeowner vacancy rate was 1.8% and the rental vacancy rate was 6.5%.

24.0% of residents lived in urban areas, while 76.0% lived in rural areas.

=== 2000 census ===
As of the census of 2000, there were 17,423 people, 6,984 households, and 4,986 families residing in the county. The population density was 57 people per square mile (22 people/km^{2}). There were 8,409 housing units at an average density of 28 units per square mile (11/km^{2}). The racial makeup of the county was 95.58% White, 1.43% Black or African American, 0.28% Native American, 0.14% Asian, 0.02% Pacific Islander, 1.62% from other races, and 0.94% from two or more races. 3.63% of the population were Hispanic or Latino of any race.

There were 6,984 households, out of which 30.10% had children under the age of 18 living with them, 56.10% were married couples living together, 11.10% had a female householder with no husband present, and 28.60% were non-families. 25.50% of all households were made up of individuals, and 10.70% had someone living alone who was 65 years of age or older. The average household size was 2.45 and the average family size was 2.90.

In the county, the population was spread out, with 23.30% under the age of 18, 8.50% from 18 to 24, 29.30% from 25 to 44, 24.60% from 45 to 64, and 14.30% who were 65 years of age or older. The median age was 38 years. For every 100 females there were 97.70 males. For every 100 females age 18 and over, there were 94.90 males.

The median income for a household in the county was $30,359, and the median income for a family was $36,920. Males had a median income of $29,483 versus $20,953 for females. The per capita income for the county was $17,217. About 11.80% of families and 17.00% of the population were below the poverty line, including 20.00% of those under age 18 and 20.10% of those age 65 or over.

== Communities ==
=== City ===
- Smithville (county seat)

=== Towns ===
- Alexandria
- Dowelltown
- Liberty

=== Unincorporated communities ===
- Belk
- Midway
- Temperance Hall

== Education ==
The DeKalb County School District consists of five public schools, one private school, and an adult education center.

- DeKalb Christian Academy (PreK-12) – opened 2017
- DeKalb County High School (9–12) – opened 1963
- DeKalb Middle School (6–8) – opened 1971
- DeKalb West School (PreK–8) – opened 1973
- Northside Elementary School (2–5) – opened 2000
- Smithville Elementary School (PreK–2) – opened 1958

DeKalb County operated two high schools from the 1920s to 1963, Liberty High School and Smithville High School (originally Pure Fountain High School and later DeKalb County High School). In January 1962, Smithville High School burned down, and the present high school was constructed in a different part of town. When the school opened, Liberty High was closed and consolidated with DeKalb County beginning in September 1963.

== Politics ==
DeKalb County is a Republican stronghold. The last Democrat to carry this county was Al Gore in 2000. Even before the rapid trend of the upland South away from the Democratic Party, DeKalb County was unusual for Middle Tennessee as it had significant Unionist sympathy and was a competitive county for the GOP even at the height of the "Solid South" era.

United States presidential election results for DeKalb County, Tennessee
Year	Republican		Democratic		Third party(ies)	
Year	No.	%	No.	%	No.	%
1912	1,219	42.33%	1,394	48.40%	267	9.27%
1916	1,343	48.66%	1,407	50.98%	10	0.36%
1920	2,572	56.47%	1,983	43.53%	0	0.00%
1924	1,406	43.17%	1,829	56.16%	22	0.68%
1928	2,261	57.23%	1,690	42.77%	0	0.00%
1932	1,530	39.71%	2,323	60.29%	0	0.00%
1936	2,140	41.92%	2,947	57.73%	18	0.35%
1940	2,041	41.90%	2,830	58.10%	0	0.00%
1944	2,161	48.00%	2,341	52.00%	0	0.00%
1948	1,751	39.69%	2,412	54.67%	249	5.64%
1952	1,814	48.21%	1,949	51.79%	0	0.00%
1956	1,690	45.76%	1,982	53.67%	21	0.57%
1960	1,440	47.59%	1,547	51.12%	39	1.29%
1964	1,402	37.96%	2,291	62.04%	0	0.00%
1968	1,532	39.33%	847	21.75%	1,516	38.92%
1972	2,014	60.66%	1,243	37.44%	63	1.90%
1976	1,443	30.69%	3,222	68.52%	37	0.79%
1980	1,841	37.82%	2,948	60.56%	79	1.62%
1984	2,337	46.65%	2,645	52.79%	28	0.56%
1988	2,098	45.80%	2,452	53.53%	31	0.68%
1992	1,714	25.50%	4,382	65.19%	626	9.31%
1996	1,696	31.99%	3,213	60.60%	393	7.41%
2000	2,411	38.48%	3,765	60.10%	89	1.42%
2004	3,685	51.37%	3,445	48.03%	43	0.60%
2008	4,085	57.82%	2,832	40.08%	148	2.09%
2012	4,143	64.40%	2,174	33.79%	116	1.80%
2016	5,171	74.35%	1,569	22.56%	215	3.09%
2020	6,672	78.37%	1,750	20.56%	91	1.07%
2024	7,599	80.87%	1,706	18.16%	91	0.97%

== See also ==
- National Register of Historic Places listings in DeKalb County, Tennessee
