= National Register of Historic Places listings in Putnam County, Tennessee =

Location of Putnam County in Tennessee

This is a list of the National Register of Historic Places listings in Putnam County, Tennessee.

This is intended to be a complete list of the properties and districts on the National Register of Historic Places in Putnam County, Tennessee, United States. Latitude and longitude coordinates are provided for many National Register properties and districts; these locations may be seen together in a map.

There are 16 properties and districts listed on the National Register in the county.

Contents: Counties in Tennessee
Anderson – Bedford – Benton – Bledsoe – Blount – Bradley – Campbell – Cannon – Carroll – Carter – Cheatham – Chester – Claiborne – Clay – Cocke – Coffee – Crockett – Cumberland – Davidson – Decatur – DeKalb – Dickson – Dyer – Fayette – Fentress – Franklin – Gibson – Giles – Grainger – Greene – Grundy – Hamblen – Hamilton – Hancock – Hardeman – Hardin – Hawkins – Haywood – Henderson – Henry – Hickman – Houston – Humphreys – Jackson – Jefferson – Johnson – Knox – Lake – Lauderdale – Lawrence – Lewis – Lincoln – Loudon – Macon – Madison – Marion – Marshall – Maury – McMinn – McNairy – Meigs – Monroe – Montgomery – Moore – Morgan – Obion – Overton – Perry – Pickett – Polk – Putnam – Rhea – Roane – Robertson – Rutherford – Scott – Sequatchie – Sevier – Shelby – Smith – Stewart – Sullivan – Sumner – Tipton – Trousdale – Unicoi – Union – Van Buren – Warren – Washington – Wayne – Weakley – White – Williamson – Wilson

This National Park Service list is complete through NPS recent listings posted November 28, 2025.

== Current listings ==
	Name on the Register	Image	Date listed	Location	City or town	Description
1	Algood Methodist Church	Algood Methodist Church	November 15, 1979 (#79002454)	158 Wall St. 36°11′37″N 85°26′57″W	Algood	
2	The Arcade	The Arcade	April 17, 1979 (#79002455)	7-13 S. Jefferson Ave. 36°09′45″N 85°30′01″W	Cookeville	Currently an office building
3	Broad Street Church of Christ	Broad Street Church of Christ	February 1, 2002 (#01001567)	157 E. Broad St. 36°09′48″N 85°30′57″W	Cookeville	Now a Methodist church known as "Wesley Chapel"
4	Buffalo Valley School	Buffalo Valley School	July 5, 2006 (#06000548)	2717 Buffalo Valley School Rd. 36°08′36″N 85°46′57″W	Buffalo Valley	
5	Burgess Falls Hydroelectric Station	Burgess Falls Hydroelectric Station	July 5, 1990 (#90001006)	State Route 135 over the Falling Water River; 36°02′42″N 85°35′52″W	Cookeville vicinity	Accessible from Burgess Falls State Park; TN-135 crosses the river just upstream from the dam
6	Cookeville Railroad Depot	Cookeville Railroad Depot	November 7, 1985 (#85002773)	Broad and Cedar Sts. 36°09′51″N 85°30′30″W	Cookeville	Now a museum
7	Cowen Farmstead	Cowen Farmstead	March 25, 2005 (#05000205)	2671 Little Indian Creek Rd. 36°12′52″N 85°44′08″W	Buffalo Valley	Now a red angus ranch known as Heritage Farms
8	First Presbyterian Church	First Presbyterian Church	December 27, 2010 (#10001060)	20 N. Dixie Ave. 36°09′48″N 85°30′08″W	Cookeville	Congregation founded in 1867, current church built in 1910
9	Harding Studio	Harding Studio	April 21, 1992 (#92000355)	43 W. Broad St. 36°09′51″N 85°30′26″W	Cookeville	Used as a photography studio by the Harding family, 1914-1974
10	Henderson Hall	Henderson Hall	November 7, 1985 (#85002754)	Tennessee Technological University, Dixie Ave. 36°10′30″N 85°30′18″W	Cookeville	Houses Tennessee Tech's History and English department offices; designed by R. H. Hunt
11	John's Place	John's Place	March 15, 2011 (#11000085)	11 Gibson Ave. 36°10′03″N 85°31′10″W	Cookeville	Established in 1949 as a grocery store and restaurant for Cookeville's small African-American community; has been operated by the McClellan family since its establishment
12	Ralph's Donut Shop		August 1, 2025 (#100012064)	59 S. Cedar Avenue; 36°09′45″N 85°30′29″W	Cookeville	Donut shop established in 1962
13	The Science Building	The Science Building	April 10, 2017 (#100000858)	1 William L. Jones Dr. 36°10′27″N 85°30′17″W	Cookeville	Located on the campus of Tennessee Technological University; now known as the T.J. Farr Building.
14	United States Post Office and Court House	United States Post Office and Court House	December 16, 2014 (#14001053)	9 E. Broad St. 36°09′49″N 85°30′22″W	Cookeville	Now called the L. Clure Morton United States Post Office and Courthouse.
15	West End Church of Christ Silver Point	West End Church of Christ Silver Point	December 13, 2007 (#07001270)	14360 Center Hill Dam Rd. 36°05′26″N 85°44′26″W	Silver Point	Evolved from Silver Point Christian Institute, established in 1909
16	White Plains	White Plains	August 11, 2009 (#09000538)	2700 Old Walton Rd. 36°10′39″N 85°27′01″W	Cookeville vicinity	

== See also ==
- List of National Historic Landmarks in Tennessee
- National Register of Historic Places listings in Tennessee
