= Marshall Keeble =

American preacher

- Born: December 7, 1878; Rutherford County, Tennessee
- Died: April 20, 1968 (aged 89); Nashville, Tennessee
- Occupation: Evangelist
- Years active: 1914–1968
- Spouse(s): Minnie Womack, 1896–1932; Laura Catherine Johnson, 1934–2007

Marshall Keeble (December 7, 1878 – April 20, 1968) was an African American preacher of the Churches of Christ, whose successful career notably bridged a racial divide in an important American religious movement prior to the Civil Rights Movement. Over the course of his 50-year career as a gospel preacher, he was credited with starting almost every African-American Church of Christ in the state of Tennessee. Keeble enjoyed an almost unrivaled position as an African-American subject of hagiographical biography by white contemporaries within the church of which Keeble was a member. A notable example of this is Roll Jordan Roll by fellow minister and longtime Keeble associate, J. E. Choate.

== Early life and education ==
Marshall Keeble was the son of Robert and Mittie Keeble, both of whom had been slaves.

Marshall and his family moved to Nashville about 1883. He attended school in Nashville, but did not progress beyond the seventh grade. Despite this, he went on to become an entrepreneur and an accomplished debater.

== Early career ==
Marshall Keeble began preaching in 1897 with the support and encouragement of his father-in-law, S. W. Womack and other preachers. Though he and his wife, Minnie, ran several businesses, he put secular work behind him in 1914 in order to become a dedicated preacher.

In 1918, he helped, for the first of what would be many times, start a congregation of African-American members of the Church of Christ. When he tried to secure a meeting place to preach in Oak Grove, Tennessee, near Henderson, he was unable to cooperate with Baptist and Methodist congregations in the area. N.B. Hardeman, the president and namesake of Freed-Hardeman College (now Freed-Hardeman University), helped him find space at a nearby school so that the group could assemble. The meeting resulted in 84 baptisms, and Hardeman would go on to be a supporter of Keeble’s work for decades, using his influence to encourage people to attend Keeble’s meetings and worship services.

Around 1920, Keeble met and became a lifelong friend of A. M. Burton, founder of the Life and Casualty Insurance Company of Tennessee, who provided funding for his preaching and travels. This consistent help certainly furthered Keeble's gospel efforts. Yet despite many of his white brethren donating money, time, and resources to see Keeble succeed, they also did not challenge the segregation of congregations. For his part, Keeble maintained an air of humility and gratitude that covered any bitterness he may have felt about preaching in the Jim Crow South. He refrained almost entirely from speaking publicly on matters of racial inequality and thus ensured he didn’t lose the support he needed from white brethren to get the message out to the African-American population. Even so, he faced racially charged threats and assaults throughout his career.

Keeble was known both for his great wit and for his willingness to preach the gospel with unapologetic fervor. An avid and skilled debater, he reasoned out his positions on such issues as foot-washing, baptism, the Holy Spirit, and miracles at debates that took him to Alabama, Oklahoma, Colorado, and Florida. Eventually, his evangelistic efforts took him to nearly every state in the country.

== Later life and career ==
In 1942, he helped found and became the first president of Nashville Christian Institute. It has been estimated that during his life, he baptized over 40,000 people around the world. Keeble was also primarily responsible for the establishment of several Christian schools, of which the primary surviving example is Southwestern Christian College. He also helped establish the Silver Point Christian Institute (now the West End Church of Christ Silver Point) in 1909.

At the age of 83, Keeble became a world traveler. On his first journey (October 1960), he and Lucien Palmer toured Israel, then proceeded on to Nigeria, where Keeble preached day and night to large audiences. While in Nigeria, he was made an honorary chief of one tribe. The second journey began in October 1962, which took Keeble, Palmer, and Nashville dairyman Houston Ezell all the way around the world. Their first stop was Nigeria, where Keeble engaged in training preachers and preparing for the construction of the Nigerian Christian Secondary School in Ukpom. The main administrative building at NCSS is named Keeble Hall in his honor. The Christians in Nigeria also pleaded with Keeble to start a hospital there, and he relayed the plea from pulpits back in America. Partly as a result, the Nigerian Christian Hospital was founded in 1965. From Nigeria, the three travelers went on to Ethiopia, India, Singapore, and Korea, among other places. Finally, they returned home via Hawaii and Los Angeles.

In 1965, Keeble was honored by Harding University with an honorary Doctor of Law degree. Tennessee Governor Frank G. Clement appointed him a Colonel Aide-de-Camp. He was the first African-American so honored in Tennessee history. He preached his last sermon on April 17, 1968.

== Personal life and death ==
Keeble's first marriage to Minnie Womack, a graduate of Fisk University High School, began in 1896. Their marriage lasted until her death on December 11, 1932. The couple had five children, all of whom died in infancy, childhood, or early adulthood; all preceded Keeble in death.

Keeble married his second wife, Laura Catherine Johnson, on April 3, 1934. A long-time friend and fellow preacher, B. C. Goodpasture, officiated at the ceremony. Keeble's second wife was born on August 6, 1898. She was baptized into Christ in 1913. She died at age 108 on March 5, 2007.

Keeble died on April 20, 1968. He was buried in the historic African-American Greenwood Cemetery in Nashville.

== Notes and references ==
Another semi-biographical account is His Hand and Heart: The Wit and Wisdom of Marshall Keeble by Willie Cato.
