= Silver Point =

Silver Point may refer to:

- Silver Point Capital, a Connecticut-based hedge
- Silver Point, Tennessee, an unincorporated community in the United States
- Silver Point School, a co-ed school in India

== See also ==
- Silverpoint, a traditional drawing technique
- The term "silverpoint" may also refer to the freezing point of pure silver, when used as a reference temperature, as in the International Temperature Scale of 1990
