= Cold-core low =

Cyclone with an associated cold pool of air at high altitude

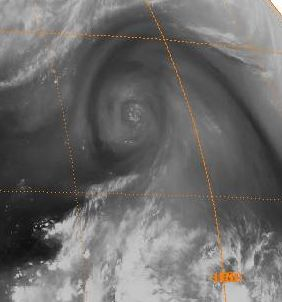
Image of an upper tropospheric cyclonic vortex in the western North Pacific, a cold-core low

A cold-core low, also known as an upper level low or cold-core cyclone, is a cyclone aloft which has an associated cold pool of air residing at high altitude within the Earth's troposphere, without a frontal structure. It is a low pressure system that strengthens with height in accordance with the thermal wind relationship. If a weak surface circulation forms in response to such a feature at subtropical latitudes of the eastern north Pacific or north Indian oceans, it is called a subtropical cyclone. Cloud cover and rainfall mainly occurs with these systems during the day.

Severe weather, such as tornadoes, can occur near the center of cold-core lows. Cold lows can help spawn cyclones with significant weather impacts, such as polar lows, and Kármán vortices. Cold lows can lead directly to the development of tropical cyclones, owing to their associated cold pool of air aloft or by acting as additional outflow channels to aid in further development.

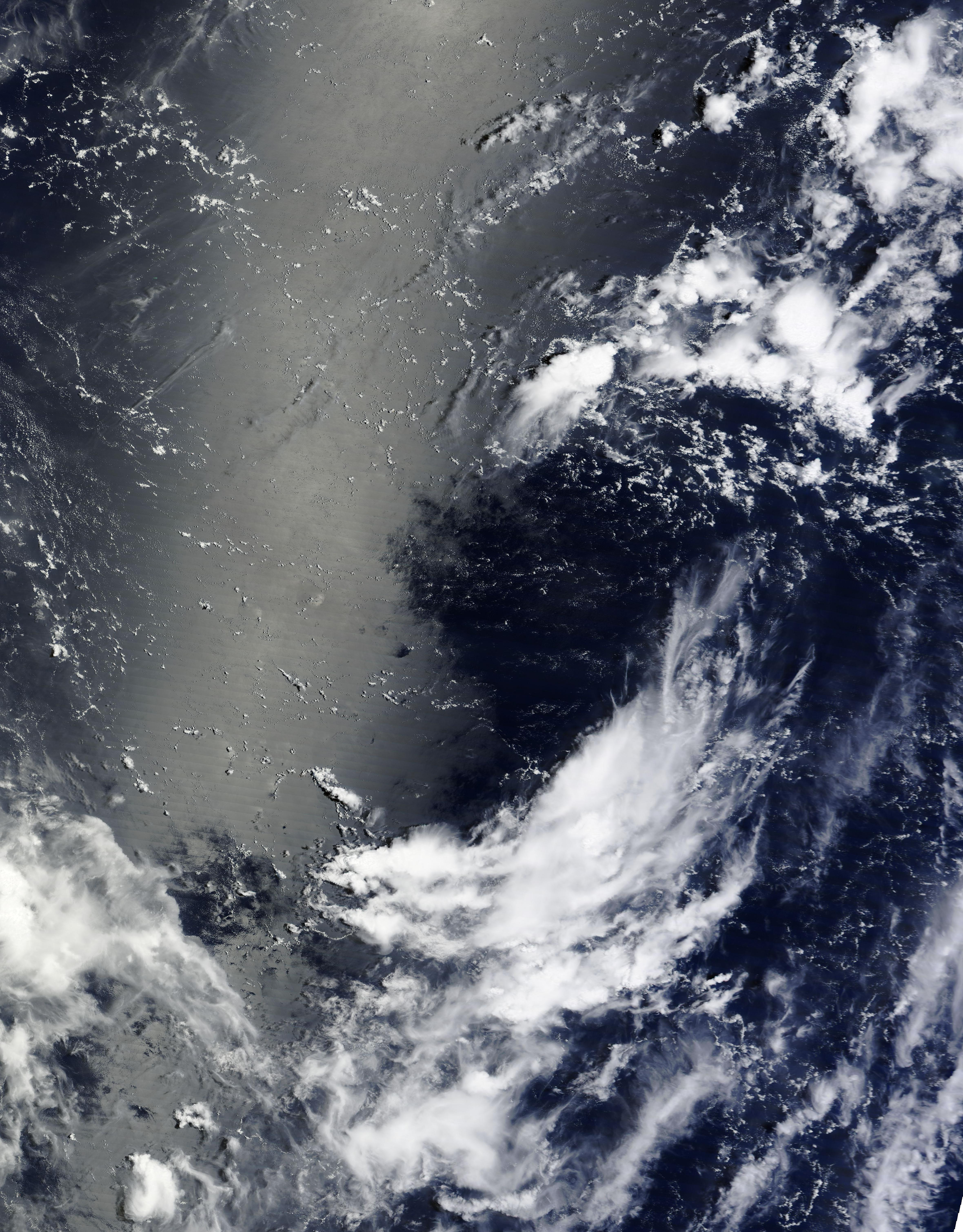
An upper tropospheric cyclonic vortex in the western North Pacific, showing high level cloud tops being sucked in

== Characteristics ==
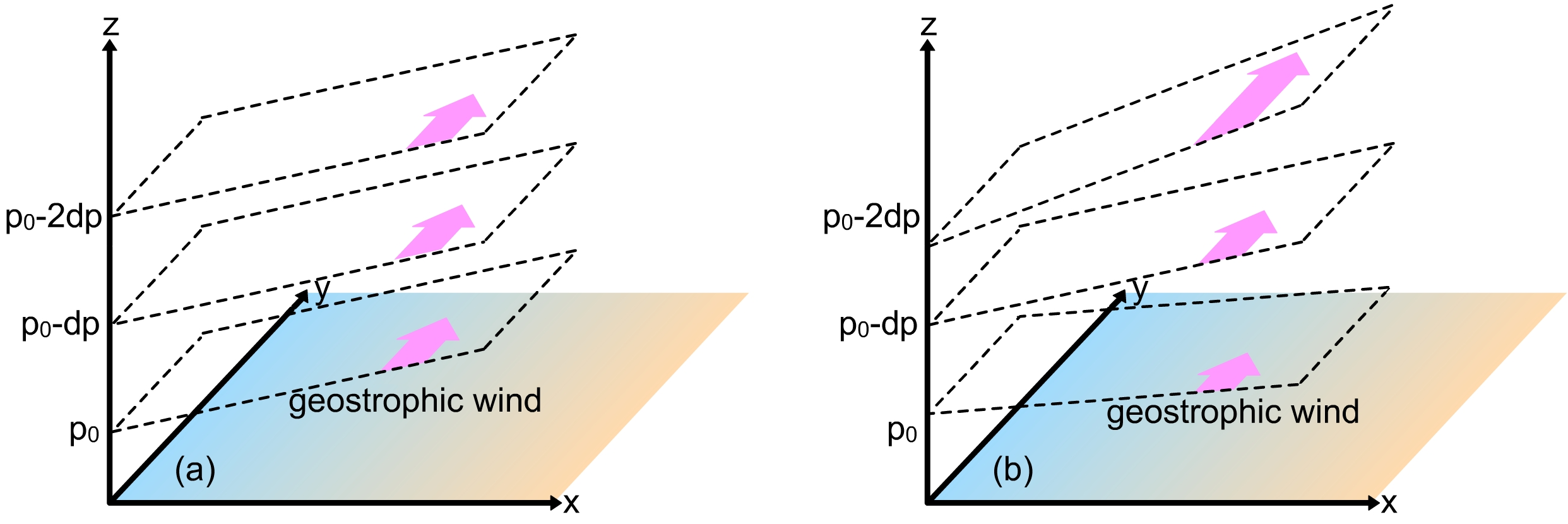
The vertical variation of geostrophic wind in a barotropic atmosphere (a) and in a baroclinic atmosphere (b). The blue portion of the surface denotes a cold region while the orange portion denotes a warm region.

Cold cyclones are stronger aloft than at the Earth's surface, or stronger in areas of the troposphere with lower pressures, per the thermal wind relationship and the hypsometric equation. The hypsometric equation dictates that colder atmospheres have less room between pressure surfaces, which corresponds to the concept of lower atmospheric thickness, and the thermal wind relation indicates that in this situation, the wind increases with height. It also means that an isolated pool of cold air aloft is associated with the feature. Because of its cold center, the center shows an area of thickness minimum. Since the temperature at any given radius is similar and parallel to the orientation of the pressure gradient, and therefore the wind, it is barotropic in nature. The movement of cold-core cyclones can be erratic since they are separated from the main belt of the Westerlies, which would otherwise steer them progressively to the east.

Most cloud cover and precipitation in association with cold lows occurs during the daylight hours as sunlight warms the Earth's surface, destabilizing the atmosphere and causing upward vertical motion. The development of severe weather, particularly tornadoes, can occur near the center of these systems over land during any season of the year. During winter, when cold-core lows with temperatures in the mid-levels of the troposphere reach −45 °C (−49 °F) move over open waters, deep convection forms which allows polar low development to become possible.

== Importance to cyclones within the subtropics and mid-latitudes ==
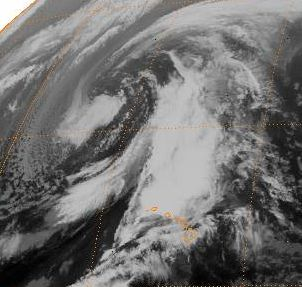
November 4, 1995 Kona Low

Kona lows, most extratropical cyclones, and tropical upper tropospheric cyclones are cold core lows. In the eastern half of the north Pacific Ocean and north Indian Ocean, the formation of a weak circulation underneath a mid to upper-tropospheric low which has cut off from the main belt of the westerlies during the cold season (winter) is called a subtropical cyclone. In the case of the north Indian Ocean, the formation of this type of vortex leads to the onset of monsoon rains during the wet season.

East coast lows form near and east of where a cold core low interacts with a sea surface temperature (SST) gradient along the east coast of continents, such as Asia, North America, southern Africa, and Australia within a pre-existing area of high pressure. Those offshore the East Coast of the United States, which normally form in the months between October and April, are termed nor'easters. Not initially associated with weather fronts, they form in tandem with blocking anticyclones at higher latitudes, which leads to a slow poleward movement up the SST gradient. East coast lows can persist for up to a week. Some East coast lows develop rapidly, becoming meteorological bombs. There is a 4.5 year cycle in the formation of East coast lows near Australia, in years in transition between warm (El Niño) and cold (La Niña) ENSO years. These systems can develop strong wind, heavy rains, waves over 10 metres (33 ft) in height, and eye features on weather satellite imagery. Upper-level lows are usually the cause of heavy rainfall and storms in southeastern Australia, particularly during La Niña years.

== Importance to tropical cyclones ==
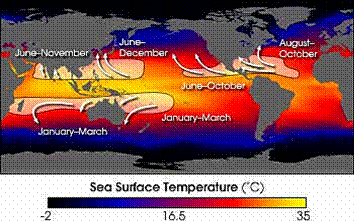
Peaks of activity worldwide

The summer tropical upper tropospheric trough in the Southern Hemisphere lies over the trade wind region of the east central Pacific and can cause tropical cyclogenesis offshore Central America. In the western Pacific, tropical upper tropospheric lows are the main cause for the few tropical cyclones which develop north of the 20th parallel north and east of the 160th meridian east during La Niña events.

Trailing upper cyclones and upper troughs can cause additional outflow channels and aid in the intensification process of tropical cyclones. Developing tropical disturbances can help create or deepen upper troughs or upper lows in their wake due to the outflow jet stream emanating from the developing tropical disturbance/cyclone. In the western North Pacific, there are strong reciprocal relationships between the areas of formative tropical cyclones and that of the lower tropospheric monsoon troughs and the tropical upper tropospheric trough. Tropical cyclone movement can also be influenced by TUTT cells within 1,700 kilometres (1,100 mi) of their position, which can lead to non-climatological tracks, such as eastward movement within the tropics or westward movement in an area where the Westerlies normally dominate.

Normally, an ocean temperature of 26.5 °C (79.7 °F) spanning through a depth of at least 50 metres (160 ft) is one of the six requirements needed to maintain the special mesocyclone that is the tropical cyclone. Cooler air temperatures at a higher altitude (e.g., at the 500 hPa level, or 5.9 km) can lead to tropical cyclogenesis at lower water temperatures than normal, as a certain lapse rate is required to force the atmosphere to be unstable enough for convection. In a moist atmosphere, this lapse rate is 6.5 °C/km (19 °F/mi), while in an atmosphere with less than 100% relative humidity, the required lapse rate is 9.8 °C/km (29 °F/mi). A recent example of a tropical cyclone that maintained itself over cooler waters was Alex of the 2016 Atlantic hurricane season, which became a hurricane over waters at only 20 °C (68 °F).

At the 500 hPa level, the air temperature averages −7 °C (18 °F) within the tropics, but air in the tropics is normally dry at this level, giving the air room to wet-bulb, or cool as it moistens, to a more favorable temperature that can then support convection. A wet-bulb temperature at 500 hPa in a tropical atmosphere of −13.2 °C (8.2 °F) is required to initiate convection if the water temperature is 26.5 °C (79.7 °F), and this temperature requirement increases or decreases proportionally by 1 °C in the sea surface temperature for each 1 °C change at 500 hpa. Under a cold cyclone, 500 hPa temperatures can fall as low as −30 °C (−22 °F), which can initiate convection even in the driest atmospheres. This also explains why moisture in the mid-levels of the troposphere, roughly at the 500 hPa level, is normally a requirement for development. However, when dry air is found at the same height, temperatures at 500 hPa need to be even colder as dry atmospheres require a greater lapse rate for instability than moist atmospheres. At heights near the tropopause, the 30-year average temperature (as measured in the period encompassing 1961 through 1990) was −77 °C (−132 °F).

== See also ==
- Cut-off low
- Cold pool
