= James C. Sadler =

James Calvin Sadler (February 9, 1920 – September 2, 2005) was an American meteorologist, and a professor in tropical meteorology at the University of Hawaiʻi at Mānoa, where he taught for 22 years. He is considered one of the pioneers of tropical meteorological study.

== Career ==
Sadler was born in Silver Point, Putnam County, Tennessee. He graduated with a civil engineering degree from the Tennessee Polytechnic Institute in 1941, receiving a meteorology certificate from the Massachusetts Institute of Technology in 1942, and later in 1947 earning a master's degree in meteorology from the University of California, Berkeley. He retired as a colonel from the United States Air Force, where he made some important contributions towards satellite observations and tropical meteorology.

== Publications ==
Sadler was the author of many books and essays on tropical meteorology including Average Cloudiness in the Tropics from Satellite Observations (1969) and Pacific Ocean Cloudiness from Satellite Observations (1976). Sadler documented the tropical cyclones over the eastern North Pacific that were revealed by satellite observations, and suggested that the upper-tropospheric circulation is a factor of development, as well as the life history of the tropical cyclones. Using charts of mean 200-hectopascal circulation for July through August to locate the circumpolar troughs and ridges, he observed that there is a trough line extending over the eastern and central North Pacific and another one extending over the North Atlantic. He also stated that the summer tropical upper tropospheric trough in the Southern Hemisphere lies over the trade wind region of the east central Pacific and can induce tropical cyclones.

According to Tom Schroeder, director of the Joint Institute for Marine and Atmospheric Research, "He was one of the foremost meteorologists of his time, and one of the founders of tropical meteorology as a discipline."

== Family ==
Sadler died on September 2, 2005, survived by his wife, the late Nanell Harding Sadler (2014), and two sons, James C. Sadler, Jr., and Glen H. Sadler. He was the brother of Washington Post journalist Christine Sadler.

== See also ==
- Upper tropospheric cyclonic vortex
