= Richard L. Coe =

American theatre and film critic (1914–1995)

- Born: Richard Livingston Coe; November 8, 1914; New York City, New York, U.S.
- Died: November 12, 1995 (aged 81); Washington, D.C., U.S.
- Occupations: Theatre and cinema critic

Richard Livingston Coe (New York City, November 8, 1914 – Washington, D.C., November 12, 1995) was a theater and cinema critic for The Washington Post for more than forty years. Coe became known as one of the most influential theater critics outside New York City. He was the leading theater reviewer in Washington when that city was a major tryout stop for shows headed for New York. It was the postwar period that was considered Broadway's last golden era of prolific production. Consequently, it was often Coe's reviews that directors used to help smooth out productions before heading to the harsher lights of Broadway.

Among the many shows Coe reviewed at Washington's National Theater were David Merrick's original productions of "Hello, Dolly!" and "Carnival." He also reviewed the premieres of plays by Neil Simon, Tennessee Williams and William Inge. He often said that his interest in music and theater began during his years at the choir school of the Cathedral of St. John the Divine in Manhattan. He graduated from George Washington University in 1938 and immediately joined The Washington Post as a radio editor and assistant drama critic. During World War II he served in the United States Army Air Forces as a writer and editor for Stars and Stripes, reporting out of Cairo. He returned to the Post in 1946 as drama critic, although he also reviewed motion pictures and other entertainment. He retired in 1979 and was named a critic emeritus.

In 1946, he married noted Washington journalist Christine Sadler, who later became the Washington editor of McCall's magazine and wrote the book America's First Ladies. Mrs. Coe died in 1983.

Coe was considered a generous reviewer. The Oxford Companion to American Theatre describes him this way: "One of the leading non-New York critics, he was a warm, knowledgeable advocate of all good theater, and his views were regularly solicited by Broadway producers, even when they did not try out their shows in Washington. Mr. Coe wrote for numerous other publications, including The New York Times and The New Republic. He was also a regular radio and television commentator. He was named Critic of the Year by the Directors' Guild of America in 1963 and "Washingtonian of the Year" in 1980.His columns, however, were not limited to theatrical productions. He also wrote articles condemning racial segregation at the National Theater in the early 1950s, and seeking the repeal of a child labor law in Washington that prohibited performances by casts that included children. Coe was known as an enthusiastic advocate for new theatrical institutions in Washington, including Arena Stage and the Kennedy Center for the Performing Arts. In 1980, the New Playwrights' Theater in Washington established an award in his name.

Coe was an honorary member of the National Press Club. He died at his home in Washington, D.C. from lymphoma on November 12 1995, four days after his 81st birthday.
