= First Presbyterian Church (Cookeville, Tennessee) =

Historic church in Tennessee, United States

- U.S. National Register of Historic Places
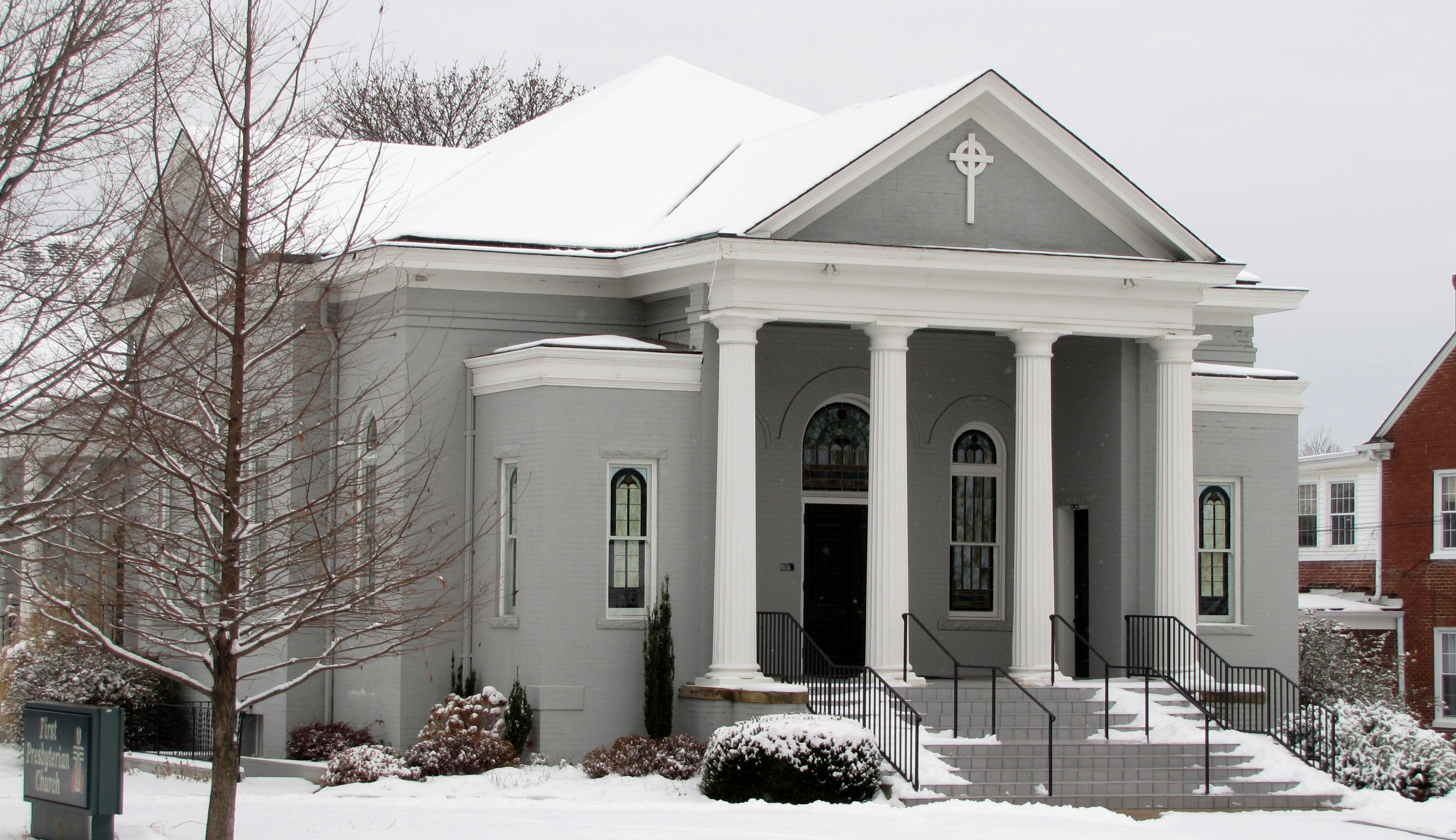
- The church in 2011

- Location within Tennessee
- Location: 20 North Dixie Avenue, Cookeville, Tennessee
- Coordinates: 36°09′48″N 85°30′08″W
- Area: 1.6 acres (0.65 ha)
- Built: 1910
- Architectural style: Greek Revival
- NRHP reference No.: 10001060
- Added to NRHP: December 28, 2010

The First Presbyterian Church is a Presbyterian Church (USA) church, and is the name of its historic church building, in Cookeville, Tennessee. The congregation was established in 1867; its building was constructed in 1910. It was designed in the Greek Revival architectural style. It has been listed on the National Register of Historic Places since December 28, 2010.
