= Kona storm =

Type of Pacific seasonal cyclone

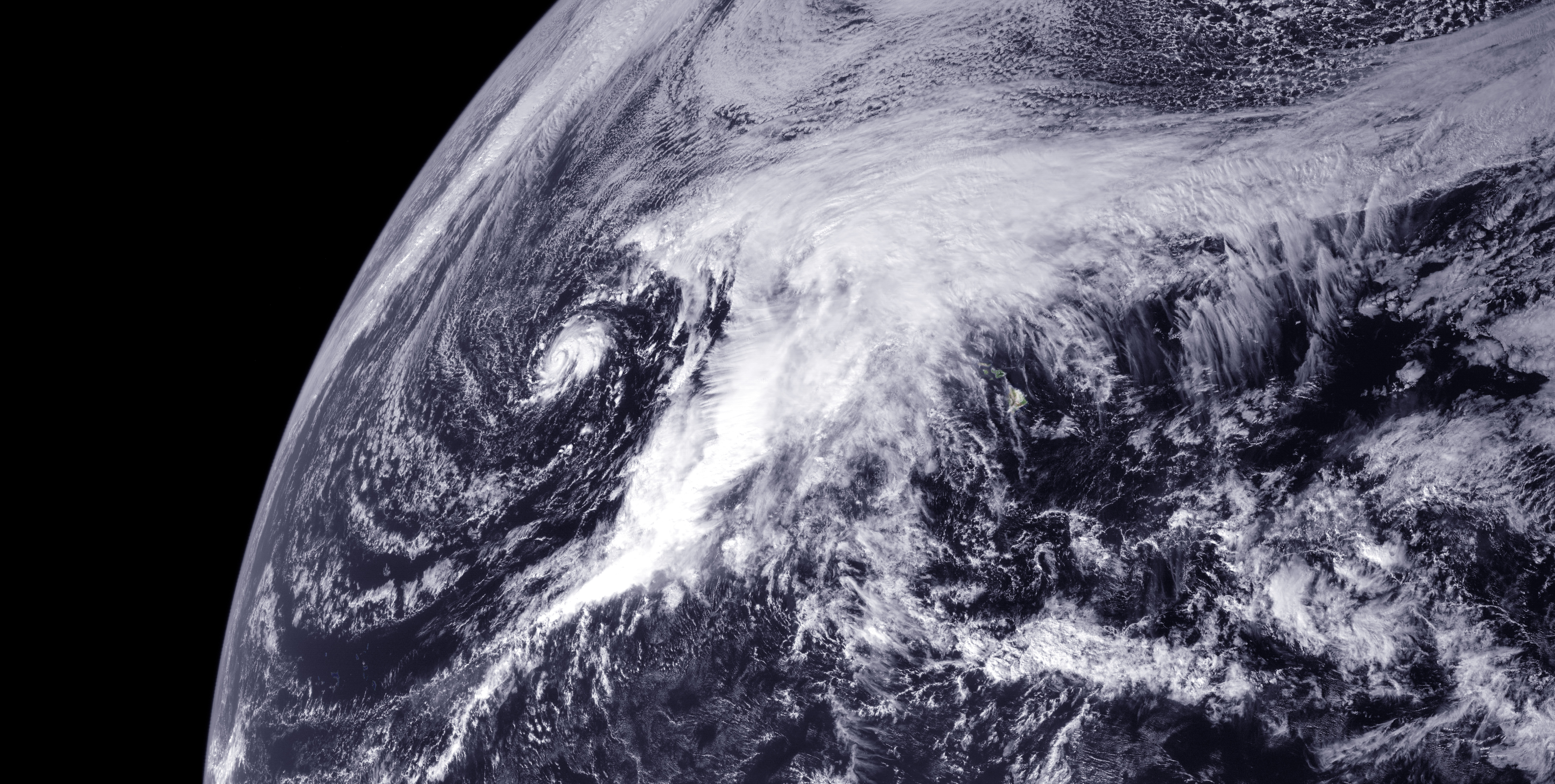
Subtropical Storm Omeka on December 19, 2010, originally a Kona storm

Kona storms (also called Kona lows) are a type of seasonal cyclone in the Hawaiian Islands, usually formed in the winter from winds coming from the westerly "kona" (normally leeward) direction. They are mainly cold core cyclones, which places them in the extratropical cyclone rather than the subtropical cyclone category. Hawaii typically experiences two to three annually, which can affect the state for a week or more. Among their hazards are heavy rain, hailstorms, flash floods and their associated landslides, high elevation snow, high winds which result in large surf and swells, and waterspouts.

== Origin of term ==
Kona is a Hawaiian language term (related to similar words in other Polynesian languages) for the western (to southwestern) side of an island. The Kona District for example on the Big Island of Hawaiʻi still uses this name. Although normally dry and leeward, the traditional easterly (to northeasterly) tradewinds slacken and reverse during one of these cyclones.

== Character of the cyclones ==
Once termed as subtropical cyclones, a change in the definition of the term during the early 1970s makes categorization of the systems not straightforward. Kona lows are typically cold core, making them extratropical cyclones. However, they generally share the subtropical cyclone characteristic of losing their associated weather fronts with time, since the cyclones tend to retrograde slowly.

Otkin and Martin identified three types of kona storms: cold-frontal cyclogenesis cyclones (CFCs), trade wind easterlies, and cold-frontal cyclogenesis/trade wind easterlies cyclones. Of the three, CFC cyclones are the most common.

Rainfall in a Kona storm is more pronounced than a cold front storm, and most intense from south to east of the storm and in front of the storm's center. Steady rains may last from several hours to days, with longer lasting storms typically interrupted by intervals of lighter rain and partial clearing. Intense showers may appear on more moderate but steady rain.

== Frequency and effects ==
While some winters occur without a single Kona storm, other winters see a high of four or five. Hawaii typically experiences two to three annually between October and April. The cyclone events for Hawaii can be long-lived, affecting the state for a week or more. Kona lows produce a wide range of weather hazards for Hawaii. Among them are heavy rain, hailstorms, flash floods and their associated landslides, high winds which result in large surf and swells, waterspouts, and heavy snows on the higher mountains.

=== Kona winds ===
Kona winds are associated with cyclones with central pressures below 1,000.0 hectopascals (29.53 inHg) which pass within 500 miles (800 km) northwest of the Hawaiian Islands. Strong Kona winds usually last for a day. Considerable damage is caused to boats lying southwest of the islands. On land, trees are uprooted and roofs can be blown off homes. When passing through mountain gaps and over mountains, downsloped winds gust over 100 mph (160 km/h), which causes much of the destruction.

=== Examples ===
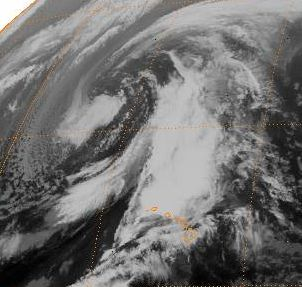
A kona storm on November 4, 1995

The most powerful Kona storm in the last fifty years struck the Hawaiian islands between 8 January and 11 January 1980. The low pressure primarily responsible for the severe conditions had a barometric pressure of 975 mb (28.79 inHg) on January 8, while passing north of the state, one of the lowest pressure readings ever recorded in Hawaiian waters as a result of an extratropical storm. The storm caused severe weather across the entire state, forcing the closure of all airports. Rainfall from the storm was extremely heavy, surpassing twenty inches in many locations, particularly on the Big Island and Maui. High surf from the storm caused extensive damage, particularly along the Kona coast of the Big Island, where the towns of Kailua-Kona and Puako received extensive damage. Winds from the storm averaged around 40-50 mph on the open ocean, but varied tremendously on land due to unique geographic features. Some areas experienced wind gusts well over hurricane force, including a low altitude gust of 106 mph (171 km/h) on Lahaina Roads, Maui. Haiku, on the windward coast of Maui, experienced a wind gust of 75 mph (121 km/h). On the high mountain summits of the Big Island and Maui, winds of over 110 mph (180 km/h) were recorded. Damage from the storm was estimated at between $25 and 35 million (in 1980 dollars).

In December 2008, lightning strikes from a Kona storm caused the entire power grid of the island of Oahu to black out, while then President-elect, Barack Obama was visiting. In December 2010, a Kona storm became fully subtropical and eventually became Tropical Storm Omeka.

== In popular culture ==
The fourth episode of the sixth season of Magnum, P.I. is entitled "The Kona Winds."
