= Upper tropospheric cyclonic vortex =

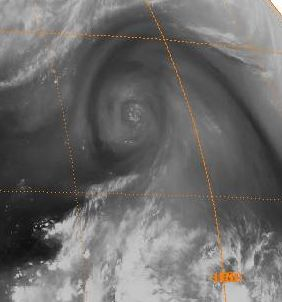
Satellite image of an upper tropospheric cyclonic vortex in the western North Pacific

An upper tropospheric cyclonic vortex is a vortex, or a circulation with a definable center, that usually moves slowly from east-northeast to west-southwest and is prevalent across Northern Hemisphere's warm season. Its circulations generally do not extend below 6,080 metres (19,950 ft) in altitude, as it is an example of a cold-core low. A weak inverted wave in the easterlies is generally found beneath it, and it may also be associated with broad areas of high-level clouds. Downward development results in an increase of cumulus clouds and the appearance of circulation at ground level. In rare cases, a warm-core cyclone can develop in its associated convective activity, resulting in a tropical cyclone and a weakening and southwest movement of the nearby upper tropospheric cyclonic vortex. Symbiotic relationships can exist between tropical cyclones and the upper level lows in their wake, with the two systems occasionally leading to their mutual strengthening. When they move over land during the warm season, an increase in monsoon rains occurs

== History of research ==
Using charts of mean 200-hectopascal circulation for July through August (located 9,200 metres (30,200 ft) above sea level) to locate the circumpolar troughs and ridges, trough lines extend over the eastern and central North Pacific and over the North Atlantic. Case studies of upper tropospheric cyclones in the Atlantic and Pacific have been performed by using airplane reports (winds, temperatures and heights), radiosonde data, geostationary satellite cloud imagery, and cloud-tracked winds throughout the troposphere. It was determined they were the origin of an upper tropospheric cold-core lows, or cut-off lows.

== Characteristics ==
The tropical upper tropospheric cyclone has a cold core, meaning it is stronger aloft than at the Earth's surface, or stronger in areas of the troposphere with lower pressures. This is explained by the thermal wind relationship. It also means that a pool of cold air aloft is associated with the feature. If both an upper tropospheric cold-core low and lower tropospheric easterly wave trough are in-phase, with the easterly wave near or to the east of the upper level cyclone, thunderstorm development (also known as moist convection) is enhanced. If they are out-of-phase, with the tropical wave west of the upper level circulation, convection is suppressed due to convergence aloft leading to downward motion over the tropical wave or surface trough in the easterlies. Upper level cyclones also interact with troughs in the subtropical westerlies, such as cold fronts and stationary fronts. When the subtropical disturbances in the Northern Hemisphere actively move southward, or dig, the area between the upper tropospheric anticyclone to its west and cold-core low to its east generally have strong northeasterly winds in addition to a rapid development of active thunderstorm activity. Cloud bands associated with upper tropospheric cyclonic vortices are aligned with the vertical wind shear. Animated satellite cloud imagery is a better tool for their early detection and tracking. The low-level convergence caused by the cut-off low can trigger squall lines and rough seas, and the low-level spiral cloud bands caused by the upper level circulation are parallel to the low-level wind direction. This has also been witnessed with upper level lows which occur at higher latitudes. For example, in areas where small-scale snow bands develop within the cold sector of extratropical cyclones.

== Climatology ==
In the Northern Hemisphere, the tropical upper tropospheric trough (TUTT) normally occurs between May and November, with peak activity between July and September. James Sadler suggested a revised model for the TUTT during the early part of the typhoon season in the western Pacific. Both Sadler and Lance Bosart have shown that the tropical upper tropospheric trough cyclonic cells are caused by the mid-latitude disturbance riding around the western side of the tropical upper tropospheric trough when the subtropical ridge to its south is quite weak. In the north Atlantic, the TUTT is characterized by the semi-permanent circulation pattern that forms in the North Atlantic between August and November. Toby Carlson evaluated data over the eastern Caribbean sea for October 1965 and pinpointed the presence of an upper tropospheric cold-core cyclone. These cold-core cyclones generally form close to the Azores and move south and westward towards a latitude of 20°N. These circulations extend over an area of about 20° of latitude (or 2,220 kilometres (1,200 nmi)) and 40° of longitude. The lowest level of closed circulation underneath the upper level cold-core cyclone is often between the 700 and the 500-hectopascal level (3,000 metres (9,800 ft) to 5,800 metres (19,000 ft) above sea level). Their life cycles span 5 to 14 days.

The upper tropospheric cyclonic centers in the North Atlantic differ from that in the North Pacific. Most of them are detectable in the low tropospheric temperature field as cold troughs in the easterlies. They tend to vertically tilt toward the northeast. Cumulonimbus clouds and rainfall occur in the southeast quadrant, approximately 5° latitude (or 555 kilometres (300 nmi)) from the upper cyclone center. Large variations of cloud cover can exist in different systems. The summer tropical upper tropospheric trough is a dominant feature over the trade wind regions of the North Atlantic Ocean, Gulf of Mexico, and Caribbean Sea, and that the lower tropospheric responses to the tropical upper tropospheric trough in the North Atlantic are differ from those in the North Pacific.

== Interaction with tropical cyclones ==
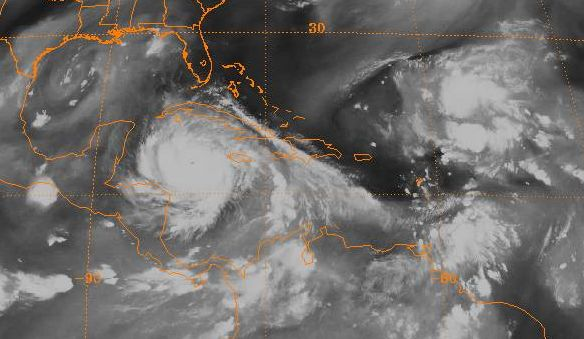
Pair of upper tropospheric cyclonic vortices in the Gulf of Mexico and Atlantic acting as outflow channels for Hurricane Dean in August 2007

The summer TUTT in the Southern Hemisphere lies over the trade wind region of the east central Pacific and can cause tropical cyclogenesis offshore Central America. University of Hawaii Professor James C. Sadler has documented tropical cyclones over the eastern North Pacific that were revealed by weather satellite observations, and suggested that the upper-tropospheric circulation is a factor in the development, as well as the life history, of the tropical cyclones. Ralph Huschke and Gary Atkinson proposed that a moist southwest wind that results from southeast trades of the eastern South Pacific deflecting towards the Pacific coasts of Central America between June and November, is known as the "temporale". Temporales are most frequent in July and August, when they can reach gale force and cause rough seas/swell. The area of heavy rain is generally located in the northeast quadrant approximately 5° of latitude (or 555 kilometres (300 nmi)) from the eye. In the western Pacific, tropical upper tropospheric lows are the main cause for the few tropical cyclones which develop north of the 20th parallel north and east of the 160th meridian east during La Nina events.

Trailing upper cyclones and upper troughs can cause additional outflow channels and aid in the intensification process of tropical cyclones. Developing tropical disturbances can help create or deepen upper troughs or upper lows in their wake due to the outflow jet stream emanating from the developing tropical disturbance/cyclone. In the western North Pacific, there are strong reciprocal relationships between the areas of formative tropical cyclones and that of the lower tropospheric monsoon troughs and the tropical upper tropospheric trough. Tropical cyclone movement can also be influenced by TUTT cells within 1,700 kilometres (920 nmi) of their position, which can lead to non-climatological tropical cyclone tracks.

== Interaction with monsoon regimes ==
As upper level lows retrograde over land masses, they can enhance thunderstorm activity during the afternoon. This magnifies regional monsoon regimes, such as that over western North America near the United States and Mexican border, which can be used to effectively forecast monsoon surges in precipitation magnitude. Across the north Indian Ocean, the formation of this type of vortex leads to the onset of monsoon rains during the wet season.
