= West End Church of Christ Silver Point =

Historic church in Tennessee, United States

- U.S. National Register of Historic Places
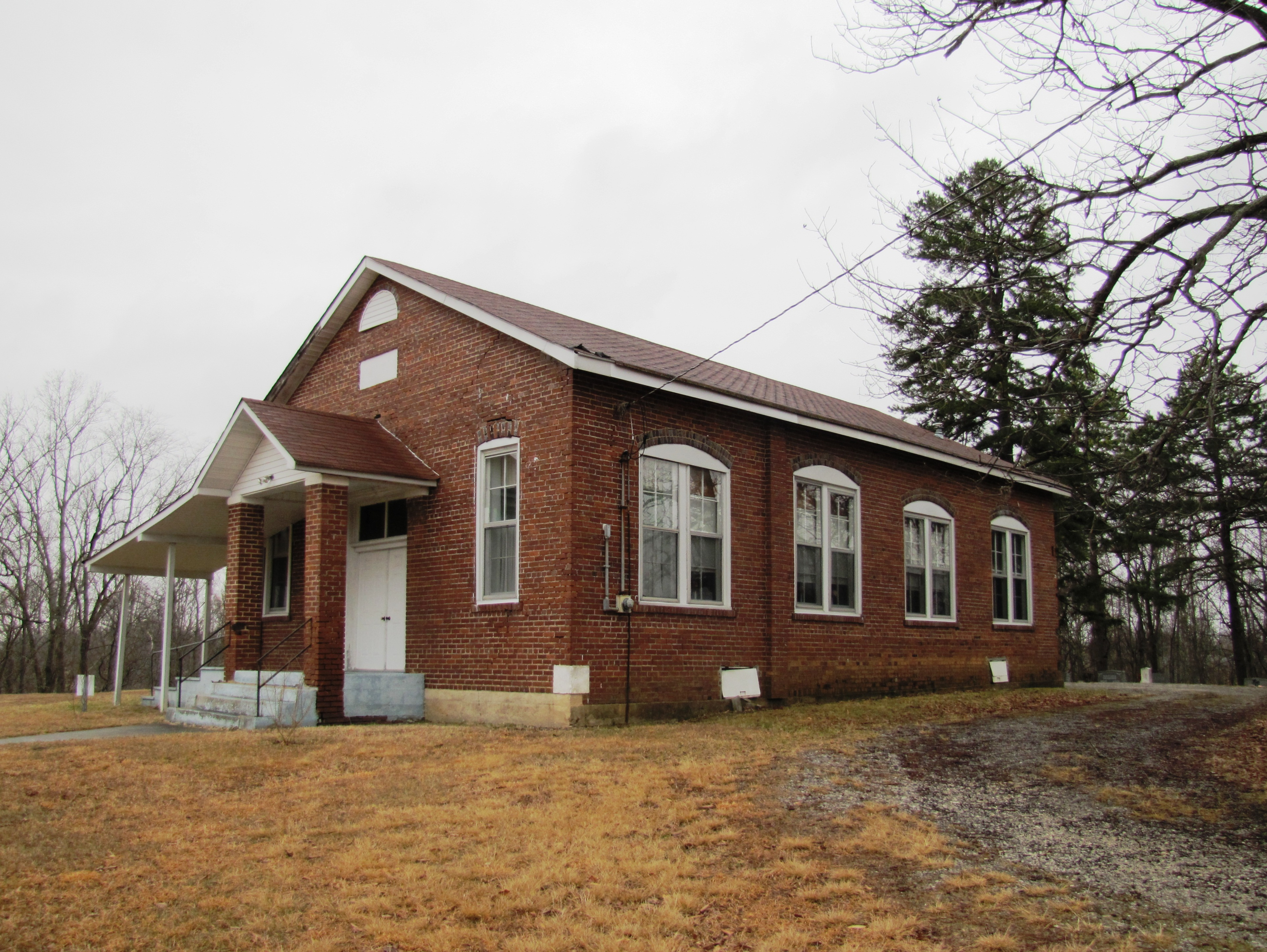
- West End Church of Christ Silver Point

- Location within Tennessee Location within the United States
- Location: 14360 Center Hill Dam Rd.
- Nearest city: Silver Point, Tennessee
- Coordinates: 36°3′26″N 85°44′26″W
- Area: Approximately one acre
- Built: 1915
- Architect: P. H. Black
- NRHP reference No.: 07001270
- Added to NRHP: December 13, 2007

The West End Church of Christ Silver Point is a folk vernacular brick church in the unincorporated community of Silver Point, Tennessee, United States. A primarily African-American Church of Christ congregation has met at the church continuously since its construction in 1915. In 2007, the church was added to the National Register of Historic Places for its role in the history of the Upper Cumberland region.

The church is rooted in the Silver Point Christian Institute, a mission school established largely through the efforts of Churches of Christ evangelists George Phillip Bowser (1874–1950) and Marshall Keeble. Along with providing badly needed education facilities to the Upper Cumberland's small African-American population, the school published the Christian Echo, a Church of Christ newsletter circulated nationwide. In spite of early financial struggles, the school, with the help of Nashville minister David Lipscomb and philanthropist A. M. Burton, managed to survive until 1959. The church, built for the mission school community in 1915, has remained in operation to the present, however.

== Location ==
The West End Church of Christ Silver Point is located along Center Hill Dam Road (State Highway 141) in the western half of Silver Point, a rural community scattered around the intersection of State Highway 141, State Highway 56, and Interstate 40, about halfway between Cookeville and Smithville. Along with the church, the property includes a modern cemetery and a small monument commemorating the church's establishment. Like most of the Highland Rim, the area is rugged and hilly.

== History ==
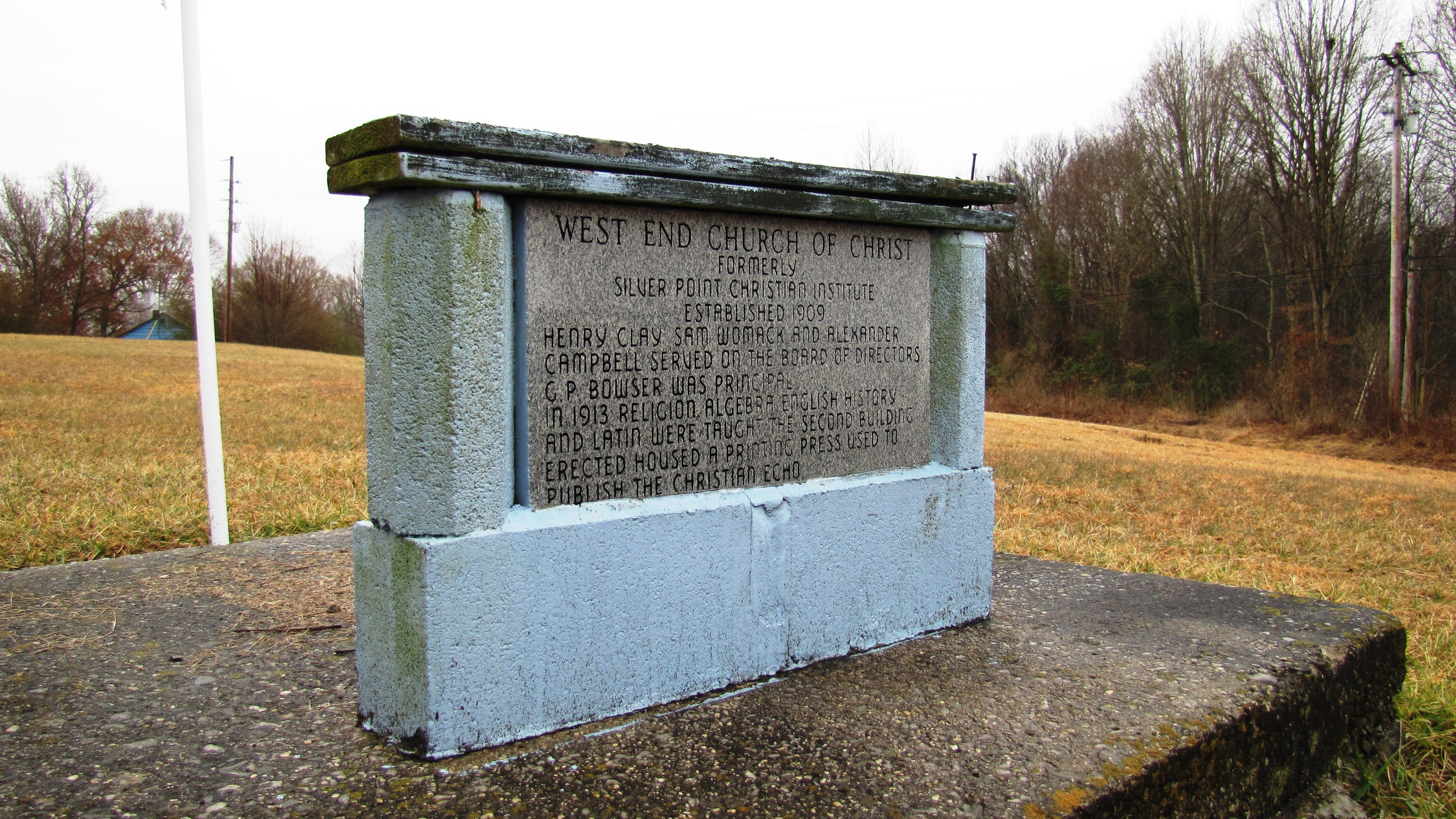
Monument commemorating the founding of the Silver Point Christian Institute

In the late-19th and early-20th centuries, education opportunities for the small African-American population of the Upper Cumberland were scarce. In his book The Souls of Black Folk, author W. E. B. Du Bois wrote of the primitive conditions of a black schoolhouse at nearby Alexandria, where he taught class while a student at Fisk University in the 1880s. In 1909, after delivering a sermon at the Laurel Hill Church of Christ in Nashville, evangelist George Phillip Bowser was approached by fellow Church of Christ ministers Sam Womack and Alexander Campbell with a request to establish a church at Silver Point. Bowser agreed on the condition that he also be allowed to establish a mission school for the area's African-American children, which was granted.

In late 1909, Bowser opened what was initially known as the Putnam County Normal and Industrial Orphanage at Silver Point. Womack, Campbell, and another Church of Christ official named Henry Clay served as the school's first board of directors. Students paid between fifty cents and one dollar per month for tuition, and six dollars per month for room and board. Operating costs were augmented by the sale of produce grown in the school's 8-acre (3.2 ha) garden, and by the sale of wagons built by Clay and several students. The school also published the Christian Echo, a Church of Christ newsletter founded by Bowser in 1903, and shipped the newsletter to subscribers across the country.

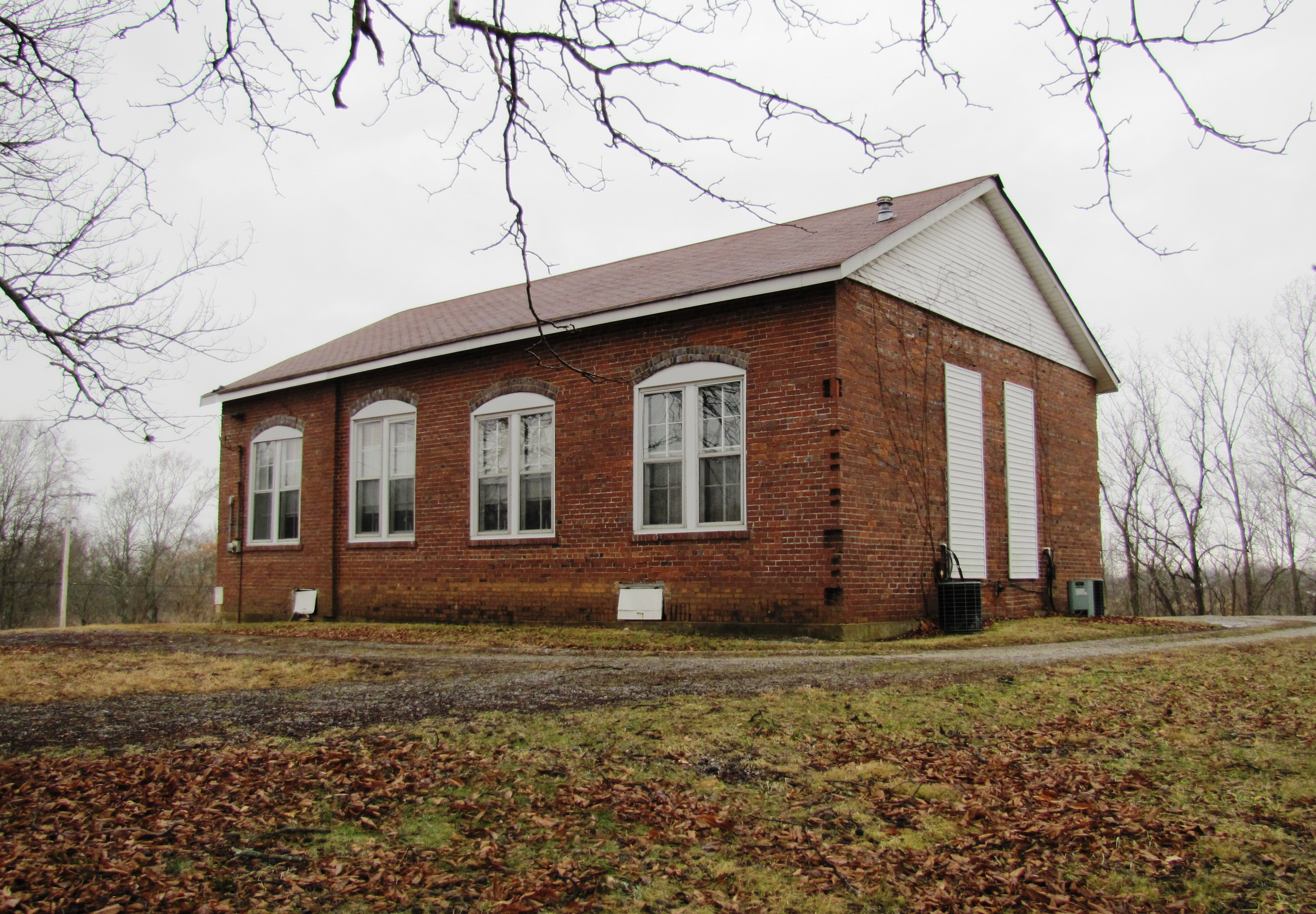
The church's northeast corner

In spite of efforts to reduce operating costs, the school struggled financially. One of the school's teachers, Annie Tuggle, asked Nashville educator and minister David Lipscomb for help, and Lipscomb turned to Nashville insurance magnate A. M. Burton, who agreed to provide financial assistance. In 1913, the school became the Silver Point Christian Institute, which taught grades 1 through 8. With better financing, a new frame building was constructed in 1915 by P. H. Black, an African-American architect from Nashville. The building was used by both the school and the West End Church of Christ congregation, the latter founded in 1915.

Bowser resigned as the school's principal in 1918 due to frustrations over lack of steady financial support for the school. He later founded schools in Michigan and Texas, and continued publishing the Christian Echo (the newsletter is still in publication today). Classes continued at the West End Church until 1959, when the school's students were bused to Putnam County's public schools. The church's congregation, however, still meets regularly.

== Design ==
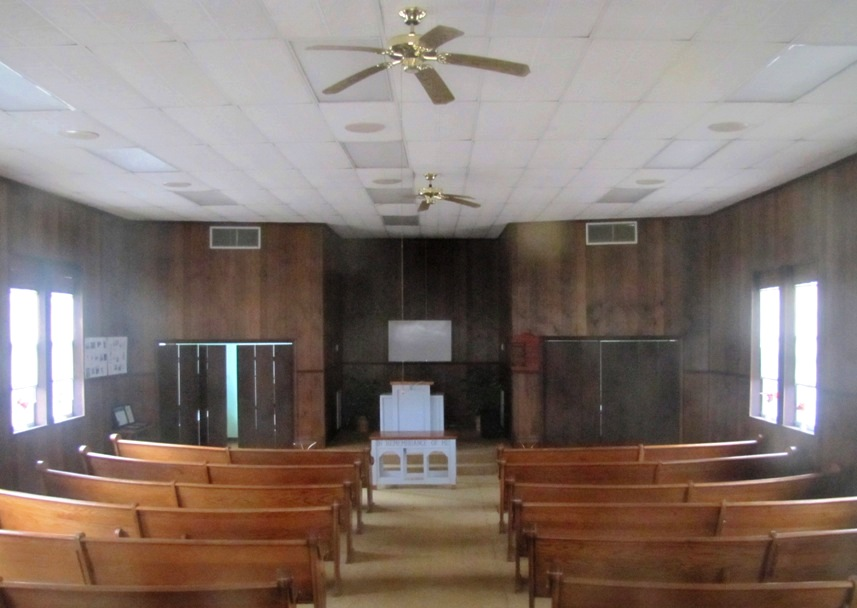
The church's interior

The West End Church of Christ Silver Point is an example of a simple, rural church with an African-American folk vernacular design. The structure is a rectangular brick structure with a concrete foundation and a gabled, asphalt-shingled roof. The church's south wall contains a covered porch and the double-door main entrance. The north wall once contained two rear doors, but these have been sealed. The east and west walls both contain four windows topped by brick arches. The top of the south wall contains a block of concrete which may have at one time held a stone inscribed with the name of the church or school.

The church's interior follows a basic floor plan, with two sets of pews divided by a central aisle leading to the pulpit. In accordance with the congregation's Campbellite understanding of Scripture that musical instruments are not authorized by the New Testament for use in worship, there is no piano or organ to be found. The pews are not original, but were retrieved from another church building. The pulpit is flanked by two rooms that serve as a Sunday school classrooms. In the 1970s, the walls were covered with wooden paneling, and acoustical tiles were added to the ceiling.

A granite monument commemorating the founding of the church and its predecessor, the Silver Point Christian Institute, stands near the entrance to the church's driveway. A modern cemetery is located behind the church.
