= The Arcade (Cookeville, Tennessee) =

- Arcade, The
- U.S. National Register of Historic Places
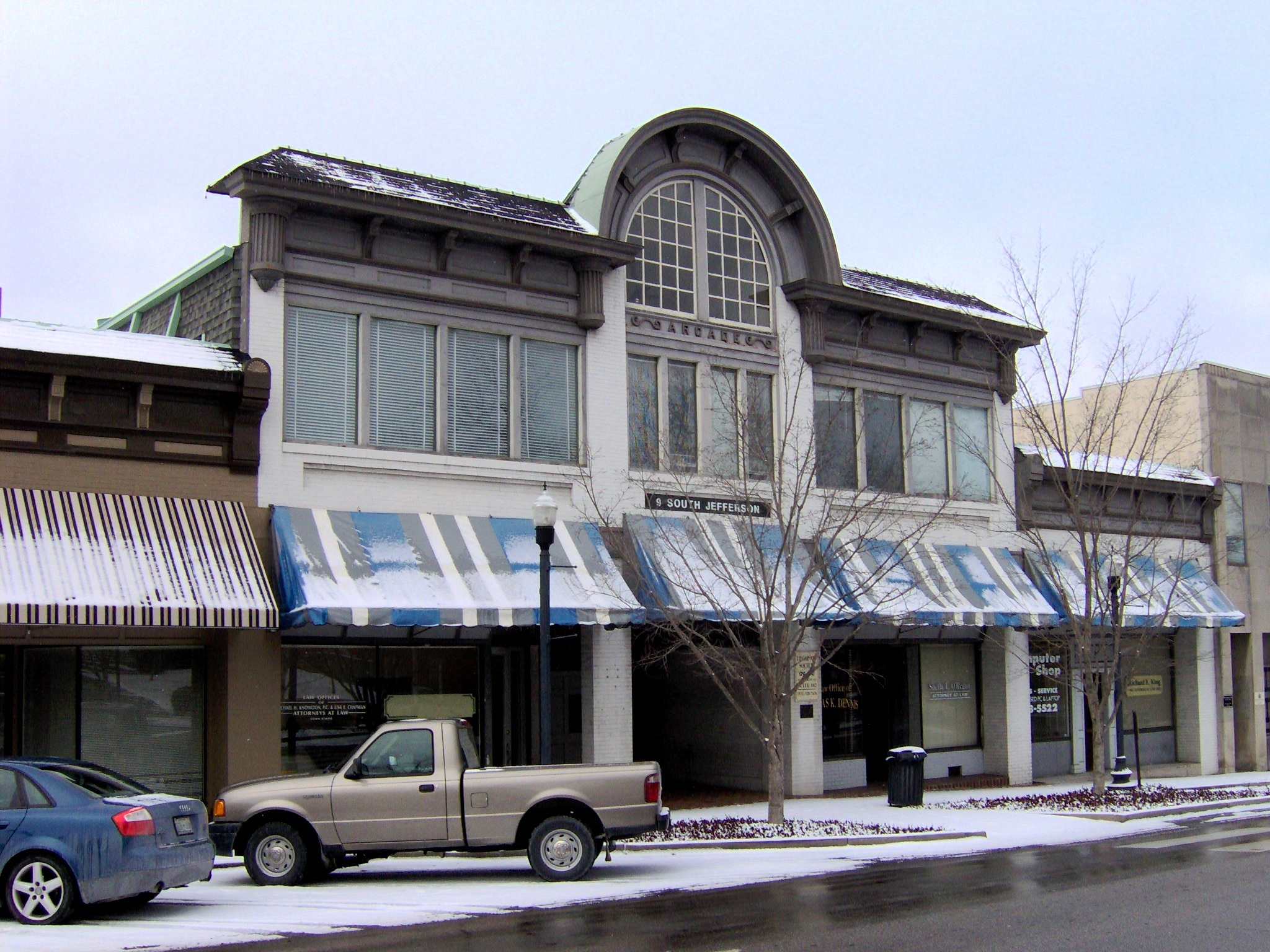
- The building in 2010

- Location within Tennessee
- Location: 7--13 South Jefferson Avenue, Cookeville, Tennessee
- Coordinates: 36°09′45″N 85°30′01″W
- Area: 0.2 acres (0.081 ha)
- Built: 1913
- Built by: Joe Scott, Bill Smoot
- Architect: Gillian Maxwell
- NRHP reference No.: 79002455
- Added to NRHP: April 17, 1979

The Arcade is a historic two-story building in Cookeville, Tennessee. It was built in 1913 on land that belonged to Gillian Maxwell and Robert Farley, the co-founders of Dixie College, later known as Tennessee Technological University. The building was designed by Maxwell, and built by Joe Scott and Bill Smoot. It was later acquired by Charlie Gibson, who sold it to Robert Lee Maddux in 1927. It has been listed on the National Register of Historic Places since April 17, 1979.

== History ==
By the late 1970s, the building had fallen into serious disrepair. Only a few businesses remained on the main level, while the entire second floor had become vacant and heavily infested with pigeons. Much of the skylight glass was broken, the roof leaked extensively, and the structure was deteriorating rapidly.

In 1978, Consolidated Design Group — a local firm composed of Patrick Hicks, John Till, and Mark Draper, with offices in the First Tennessee Bank Building — learned that the historic structure was being considered for demolition to make way for a new bank facility. The firm entered discussions with the owner, Dave Maddux of Maddux Hardware.

Maddux also served on the board of directors of First National Bank, which occupied property adjacent to the Arcade. At the time, the bank had considered redeveloping much of the block west of the courthouse for construction of a new banking complex. However, Maddux maintained a longstanding personal connection to the building. His father, Bob Maddux, and Lee Proffitt had been among the Arcade’s original tenants, and Lee Proffitt’s son, Herman, continued to operate Maddux & Proffitt, one of the building’s remaining businesses and a longtime Cookeville clothier.

Maddux offered Consolidated Design Group the opportunity to purchase the property through owner financing, including interest-only payments during the first year. The agreement provided the first significant step toward preserving the building and securing its future.

Within several months of the purchase agreement, the management structure of Consolidated Design Group changed substantially. John Till relocated to Texas, and Mark Draper departed to pursue a new retail venture, Appalachian Pottery, leaving Patrick Hicks as sole owner of the firm.

Hicks subsequently relocated his office into the Arcade and began efforts to secure the building’s placement on the National Register of Historic Places. He also prepared renovation plans and architectural renderings for the property, although financial backing for the project proved difficult to obtain.

Near the end of the year, Hicks approached former employer and architect-engineer Bill Maffett with a proposal to assume the loan and take ownership of the building. Maffett later secured a long-term lease with a legal firm for the entire second floor, substantially improving the project’s financial viability and making renovation possible.

The building’s inclusion on the National Register of Historic Places helped ensure that the structure would be preserved and that future renovations would maintain the integrity of its original architectural design.
