= Nashville Christian Institute =

Nashville Christian Institute (NCI) was an African-American preparatory school associated with the Churches of Christ. It was located in Nashville, Tennessee.

With considerable funding from Nashville insurance magnate A. M. Burton, NCI opened as a night school for adults in 1940 and became a fully accredited elementary school and high school in 1942. It ceased operation on 1967 June 2, shortly after the racial integration of Lipscomb University, also in Nashville and likewise affiliated. From 1942 until 1958 the president of NCI was Marshall Keeble.

In 2012, during a ceremony awarding an honorary doctorate to NCI graduate Fred Gray, Lipscomb University president L. Randolph Lowry III announced a restructuring of the financial arrangements involved in merging the enrollments as the 1967 adjustments had not fully satisfied NCI's supporters.
