= Algood United Methodist Church =

Historic church in Tennessee, United States

- Algood Methodist Church
- U.S. National Register of Historic Places
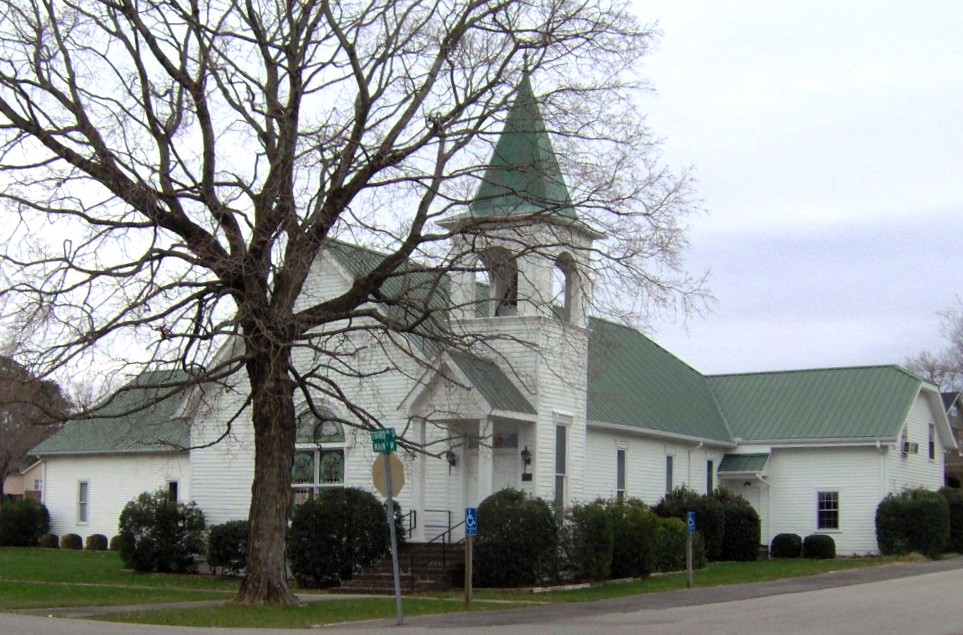

- Location within Tennessee Location within the United States
- Location: 158 Wall St, Algood, Tennessee
- Coordinates: 36°11′37″N 85°26′57″W
- Area: 0.7 acres (0.28 ha)
- Built: 1899
- Architectural style: Late Victorian
- NRHP reference No.: 79002454
- Added to NRHP: November 15, 1979

Algood United Methodist Church is a historic United Methodist church at 135 West Main Street in Algood, Tennessee.

The church was built in 1899 as a Methodist Episcopal Church, South. Land for the church was donated by brothers Alfred and Henry Algood, whose father was a circuit-riding Methodist minister. It is an example of the Carpenter Gothic architectural style. In 1909, a tornado caused extensive damage to the building. Restoration after the tornado included relocating the bell tower to the right-hand side of the building and installing the bell that still hangs there.

In its early years, the church building served as an unofficial community center for Algood and was sometimes used for worship services of other denominations.

The Algood Methodist Church building was added to the National Register of Historic Places in 1979.
