= Life and Casualty Insurance Company of Tennessee =

- Industry: Life insurance
- Founded: 1903
- Founder: Andrew Mizell Burton
- Headquarters: Nashville, Tennessee

The Life and Casualty Insurance Company of Tennessee was a life insurance company based in Nashville, Tennessee, founded in 1903 by A. M. Burton (Andrew Mizell Burton), great-grandfather of singer Amy Grant.

Burton was a regional manager for the Western & Southern Life Insurance Company, based in Cincinnati, Ohio, when it decided to discontinue operating in Tennessee. Burton was going to be discharged, but according to company lore, was told by his superior, "If you're the man that I think that you are, you'll start your own company," and he did so.

For many years, the firm sold a mixture of "industrial life insurance" policies, with small face amounts and costing low premiums, to working-class individuals and small farmers and "ordinary life" policies for middle class and affluent persons. Much of this business was sold on the "debit" or "home service" plan, where usually the agent who sold the policy initially personally called on the client to collect the premiums when they became due.

In 1957 the company occupied its new home office, the 31-story Life & Casualty Tower, located at 4th Avenue North and Church Street in downtown Nashville; the building was briefly the tallest one in the Southeast. The company was also known for its ownership of radio and television stations WLAC, properties it held until the 1970s.

In the mid-1960s, the company was sold to the American General Insurance Company of Texas, but its operations remained largely unchanged until the early 1980s. In 1968 the former Knights Life Insurance Company of Pittsburgh, Pennsylvania (then a part of American General Insurance) had its operations transferred from Pittsburgh to Nashville. When American General acquired longtime Nashville rival National Life and Accident Insurance Company in a hostile takeover it implemented plans to merge the two companies. By the end of the 1980s this had been largely accomplished, and the L&C Tower, still a Nashville landmark but no longer its tallest building, was sold to outside interests.

The company Burton founded went through a series of mergers and acquisitions which now form American General Life and Accident, now headquartered in the Nashville suburb of Brentwood, Tennessee as part of American International Group (AIG).
