= Tropical upper tropospheric trough =

Trough in the upper-level tropics

A tropical upper tropospheric trough (TUTT), also known as the mid-oceanic trough, is a trough situated in the upper-level (at about 200 hPa) tropics. Its formation is usually caused by the intrusion of energy and wind from the mid-latitudes into the tropics. It can also develop from the inverted trough adjacent to an upper level anticyclone. TUTTs are different from mid-latitude troughs in the sense that they are maintained by subsidence warming near the tropopause which balances radiational cooling. When strong, they can present a significant vertical wind shear to the tropics and subdue tropical cyclogenesis. When upper cold lows break off from their base, they tend to retrograde and force the development of, or enhance, surface troughs and tropical waves to their east. Under special circumstances, they can induce thunderstorm activity and lead to the formation of tropical cyclones.

== Location ==
The TUTT is elongated from east-northeast to west-southwest across oceans of the Northern Hemisphere, and west-northwest to east-southeast across oceans of the Southern Hemisphere. In the South Pacific, it stretches from near the equator at the 175th meridian west to the east-southeast near 30°N 105°W, offshore the western South American coast. In the South Atlantic, the TUTT extends from near the equator at the 75th meridian west east-southeast to 30°N 15°W, offshore the western coast of southern Africa. In the North Atlantic, the TUTT is oriented from 35°N 30°W (south of the Azores) to 22°N 95°W (the southern Gulf of Mexico). In the North Pacific, it stretches from 35°N 145°W (offshore western North America) to 22°N 135°E, offshore the northeast coast of the Philippines.

== Effects within the tropics ==
TUTTs sometimes bring a large amount of vertical wind shear over tropical disturbances in the deep tropics and cyclones and thus hinder their development. However, there are cases in which TUTTs assist the genesis and intensification of tropical cyclones by providing additional forced ascent near the storm center and an efficient outflow channel in the upper troposphere. This is most likely near its most westward and equatorward periphery.

== Upper lows pinching off from their base ==
Under specific circumstances, upper cold lows can break off from the base of the TUTT. These upper tropospheric cyclonic vortices usually move slowly from east-northeast to west-southwest, and generally do not extend below 20,000 feet in altitude. A weak inverted wave in the easterlies is generally found underneath them, and they may also be associated with broad areas of high-level clouds. Downward development results in an increase of cumulus clouds and the appearance of a surface vortex. In rare cases, they become warm-core, resulting in the vortex becoming a tropical cyclone. Upper cyclones and upper troughs which trail tropical cyclones can cause additional outflow channels and aid in their intensification process. Developing tropical disturbances can help create or deepen upper troughs or upper lows in their wake due to the outflow jet emanating from the developing tropical disturbance/cyclone.
