= Broad Street Church of Christ =

Historic church in Tennessee, United States

- U.S. National Register of Historic Places
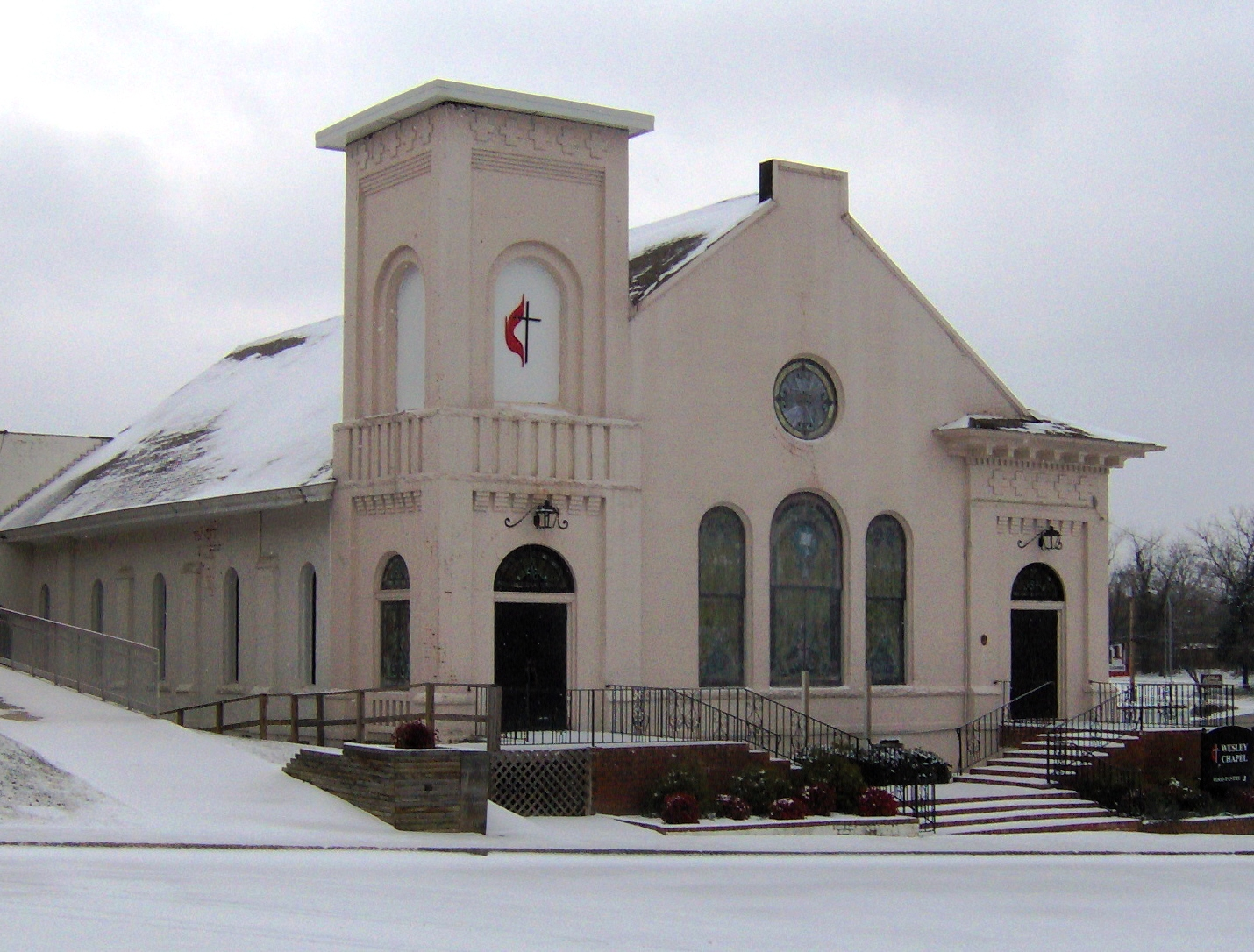

- Location within Tennessee Location within the United States
- Location: 157 E. Broad St., Cookeville, Tennessee
- Coordinates: 36°9′48″N 85°30′57″W
- Area: less than one acre
- Architect: Joseph F. Scott, William Smoot
- Architectural style: Gothic Revival
- NRHP reference No.: 01001567
- Added to NRHP: February 1, 2002

Broad Street Church of Christ, originally Central Emmanuel Baptist Church, is a historic church in Cookeville, Tennessee.

The church was originally Baptist. It is now used by the United Methodist Church and has been renamed Wesley Chapel. It was built in about 1920 in a Romanesque design and has a corner tower.

It was added to the National Register of Historic Places in 2002.
