= A. M. Burton =

American businessman and philanthropist (1879–1966)

- Born: Andrew Mizell Burton; February 2, 1879; Castalian Springs, Tennessee, United States
- Died: August 1, 1966 (aged 87); Nashville, Tennessee, United States
- Occupation: Insurance company founder
- Known for: Founder of the Life and Casualty Insurance Company of Tennessee, philanthropy relating to Churches of Christ institutions
- Board member of: Life and Casualty Insurance Company of Tennesse, David Lipscomb College, Nashville Christian Institute, Abilene Christian College
- Spouse: Lillie Armstrong Burton
- Children: 7
- Relatives: Amy Grant (great-granddaughter)

Andrew Mizell Burton (February 2, 1879 – August 1, 1966) was an American businessman and philanthropist. Born in rural Tennessee, he grew up on a farm and moved to Nashville as a teenager. After selling insurance for other companies, at age 24 he founded the Life and Casualty Insurance Company of Tennessee (L&C) in Nashville and grew it into one of the largest insurers in the United States by the middle of the 20th century.

Burton was also a prolific donor to charitable causes and institutions related to the Churches of Christ, including David Lipscomb College, where he served on the board, and other churches and educational institutions. He routinely gave away between 75 and 90 percent of his income, and it was estimated that he donated $100 million ($992 million in 2025) during his lifetime.

He was also the founder and benefactor of the Central Church of Christ in downtown Nashville, which in addition to religious functions provided a wide range of social services. In the 2020s, Burton's descendants fought a successful legal battle against a group that had taken control of the congregation and had ceased using the building as a church.

== Early life ==
Burton was born on February 2, 1879. He was born in a log house built by his pioneer great-grandfather in Castalian Springs, Tennessee, and raised on a family farm in neighboring Trousdale County. He grew up poor and would make his own hunting bullets out of zinc tubs.

At age 16, with less than three years of formal education, he walked a milk cow from the family farm to his grandmother's house in Nashville and stayed on to work in excavation at the Tennessee Centennial and International Exposition. He initially lived with well-to-do relatives in Nashville. He began work as an agent for Traders Mutual Insurance Company of Illinois and spent six years working there and for other insurers.

== Life and Casualty ==
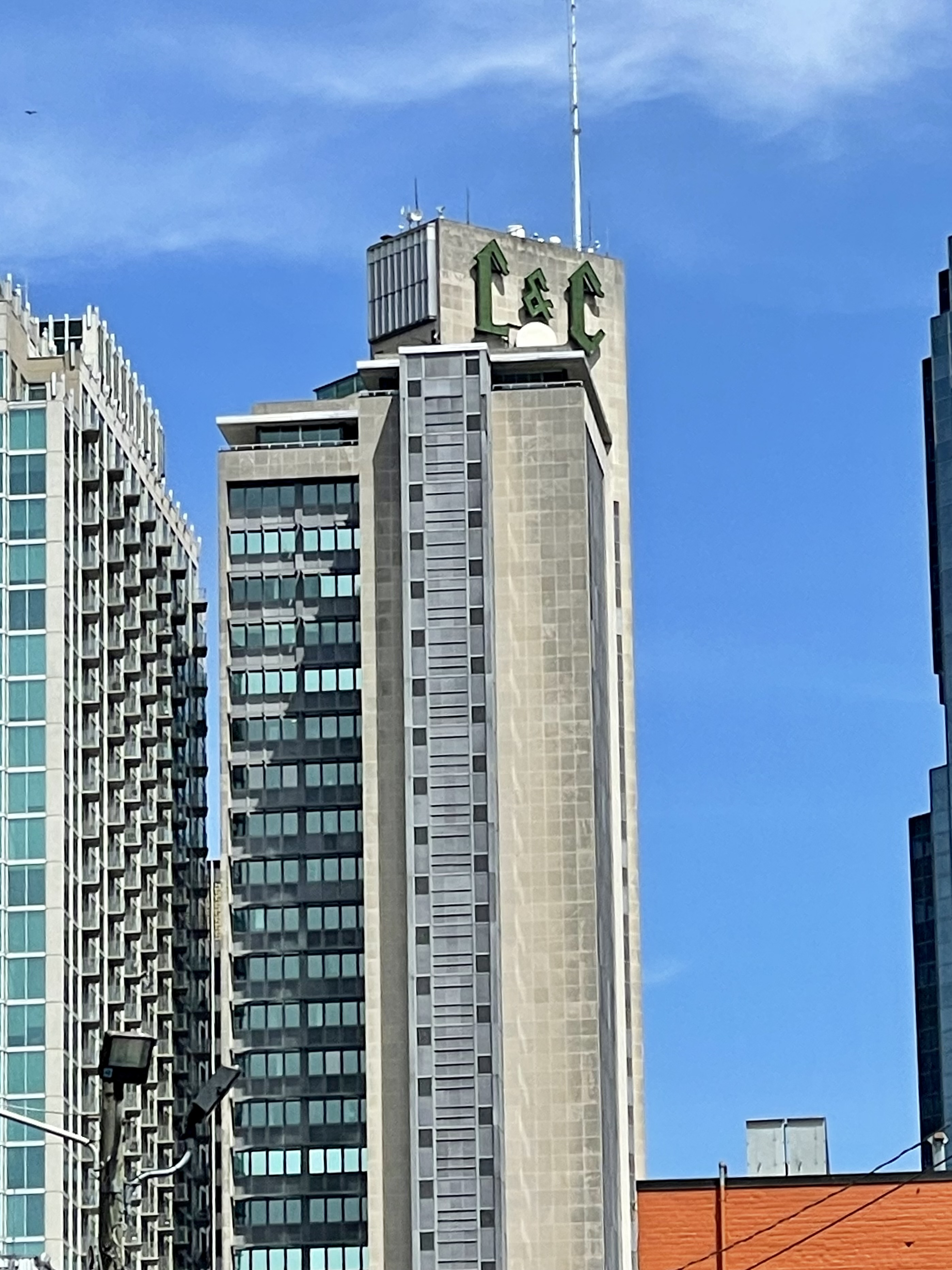
The Life & Casualty Tower in downtown Nashville

In 1903, Burton raised funds from local businessmen and put $1,000 ($35,833 in 2025) of his own savings into starting Life and Casualty Insurance Company. At age 24, he was the youngest insurance company president in the nation. The company turned its first profit in 1906. In its early years, L&C specialized in selling funeral insurance to the poor, especially to black Tennesseans. By the 1920s, this business had grown to the point that L&C had capital to branch into other insurance lines and the company had 1,500 employees operating across 12 Southern states.

Burton encouraged thrift on the part of his employees, providing them with stock in the company and incentivizing savings by paying generous interest on an Employee Savings Club. L&C offered thrift policies for customers to use for educational saving. He described himself as "trying to live according to the Golden Rule and to apply it to the business of life insurance, which I truly think is one of the most Christian institutions known to civilization." He also established radio station WLAC to promote practices of thrift.

He remained president of L&C until 1950, when he became president emeritus, and he remained a director of the firm until 1963. In 1957, a longtime ambition of Burton was achieved when the Life & Casualty Tower was completed. At that time, the 30-story building was the tallest in Tennessee and the tallest commercial building in the South. By the time of his death, L&C had $417 million ($4.14 billion in 2025) in assets and $3 billion ($29.8 billion in 2025) in life insurance policies in force and was among the largest three percent of U.S. insurers.

== Personal life and family ==
Burton married Lillie Armstrong of Rives, Tennessee, in 1904. They had seven children. His great-grandchildren include Christian pop star Amy Grant.

Burton was baptized in a Church of Christ in Nashville in 1910. At the time of his death, he was a member of the Hillsboro Church of Christ.

Burton was an avid hunter and horseback rider. According to his secretary, he never read fiction, only insurance industry reports, religious material, U.S. News & World Report magazine and the Bible.

== Philanthropy ==
Burton joined the board of the Nashville Bible School, soon to be renamed David Lipscomb College, in 1917; he later serving as chairman and chairman emeritus. After World War II, which had depressed college enrollments nationwide, he encouraged the college to expand their facilities to accommodate returning veterans. He and his wife contributed $1.5 million ($18 million in 2025) to the expansion efforts in the decade following the war.

His lifetime financial contributions to David Lipscomb College were estimated at $6 million ($59.5 million in 2025). Lipscomb College president Athens Clay Pullias described Burton as the college's most generous benefactor. The A. M. Burton Administration Building was named in his honor in 1966. The 44,000-square-foot (4,100 m^{2}) building includes the Collins Memorial Auditorium. In 1995 it became home to the college's Bible department. It was renovated as the Burton Health Sciences Center in 2008.

Central Church of Christ in 1928.

Burton founded downtown Nashville's Central Church of Christ in 1925. The Commercial Appeal described Central Church of Christ as "perhaps . . . the most unusual in the South". In addition to holding religious services on Sunday at a variety of hours and at noon on weekdays, the church offered free medical and dental clinics, free clothing, a free lunchroom, an employment agency, and child care for working mothers. The church also operated a residential facility providing affordable housing for young single women. Its services were broadcast by WLAC. By 1927, less than two years after it opened, the downtown church had 500 people attending. He also funded orphanages in Nashville and was a donor to more than one thousand Churches of Christ around the world. Burton underwrote the traveling ministry of black Churches of Christ evangelist Marshall Keeble. By 1927, he was giving away three-fourths of his income to charity.

In 1929, Burton became the first non-Texan elected to the board of Abilene Christian College. In 1939, Burton co-founded the Nashville Christian Institute (NCI), a Churches of Christ–affiliated institution for African Americans. Burton chaired its board and was its chief benefactor, with lifetime contributions of approximately $500,000 ($4.96 million in 2025). A year after Burton's death, following the integration of Lipscomb College, NCI closed its doors, and its funds were transferred to Lipscomb College's foundation to be designated for scholarships for black students.

== Death ==
Burton died of Internal bleeding at his Nashville home on August 1, 1966. Services were held at the auditorium of Lipscomb College on August 2. Tributes included a message from President Lyndon Johnson.

== Legacy ==
At the time of his death, his associates estimated that he had given away a total of $100 million ($992 million in 2025) during his lifetime, including giving away up to 90 percent of his income during the last 12 years of his life.

The deed for the Central Church of Christ's 5th Avenue building specified that it was to remain a Churches of Christ worship site. If such services ceased, the property was to revert to Burton's estate. By the 2010s, the church had dwindled in membership to just a few dozen people, most of them elderly, although the church was financially healthy due to $40,000 in monthly revenue from its two downtown parking lots and its $3 million in liquid assets. The church building itself was assessed for taxes at $6.7 million and valued at $11 million.

In 2017, Shawn Mathis joined Central Church of Christ. He impressed some of the church's members and was made an elder of the church. Shortly thereafter, he came to control the board. He incorporated a new nonprofit entity, called Nashville Church of Christ, to operate the building. Church services in the building ceased in 2018. Amy Grant and other A. M. Burton descendants began investigating whether the building's use was still in compliance with the deed, and Mathis sued the Burton heirs to dissolve the conditions of the deed. Records showed that after the church ceased holding services, it was paying Mathis and a relative hundreds of thousands of dollars in compensation.

A state court rejected Mathis' argument and ruled that the church had violated the deed. In October 2025 the court approved a settlement that would result in the church property's sale, with the lion's share going to the Burton heirs. In conjunction with the settlement, Burton heirs announced the creation of the A.M. Burton Matthew 25 Fund at the Community Foundation of Middle Tennessee.
