= Christine Sadler =

American journalist

- Born: 1902; Silver Point, Putnam County, Tennessee, U.S.
- Died: 1983 (aged 80–81)
- Education: Vanderbilt University
- Occupations: Journalist; magazine editor
- Writing career
- Genre: Non-fiction

Christine Sadler (1902–1983), born in Silver Point, Putnam County, Tennessee, was an American writer, journalist, and magazine editor.

== Biography ==
Christine Sadler received her undergraduate degree from Peabody College (now an affiliate of Vanderbilt University) and her master's degree in journalism from Columbia University in 1937.

Originally a journalist for the Nashville Banner (1930–1936), she was a reporter, national news bureau staffer and Sunday Editor for The Washington Post from 1937 until 1946. She was president of the Women's National Press Club early in her career in Washington. Sadler was the first woman to cover a national political convention for The Washington Post.

She was appointed and served as a charter member of The Defense Department Advisory Committee on Women in the Services from 1956 through 1959.

While continuing to write for the Post on a freelance basis for many years, Sadler became Washington, D.C. editor of McCall's magazine in 1944 until her retirement from that position in 1971. Sadler covered the White House for both the Post and McCall's, and authored two books, America's First Ladies and Children in the White House.

She was survived in death by her husband, Richard L. Coe, theater critic emeritus for the Post.
