= Silver Point, Tennessee =

Unincorporated community in Tennessee, US

Coordinates: 36°05′26″N 85°43′47″W

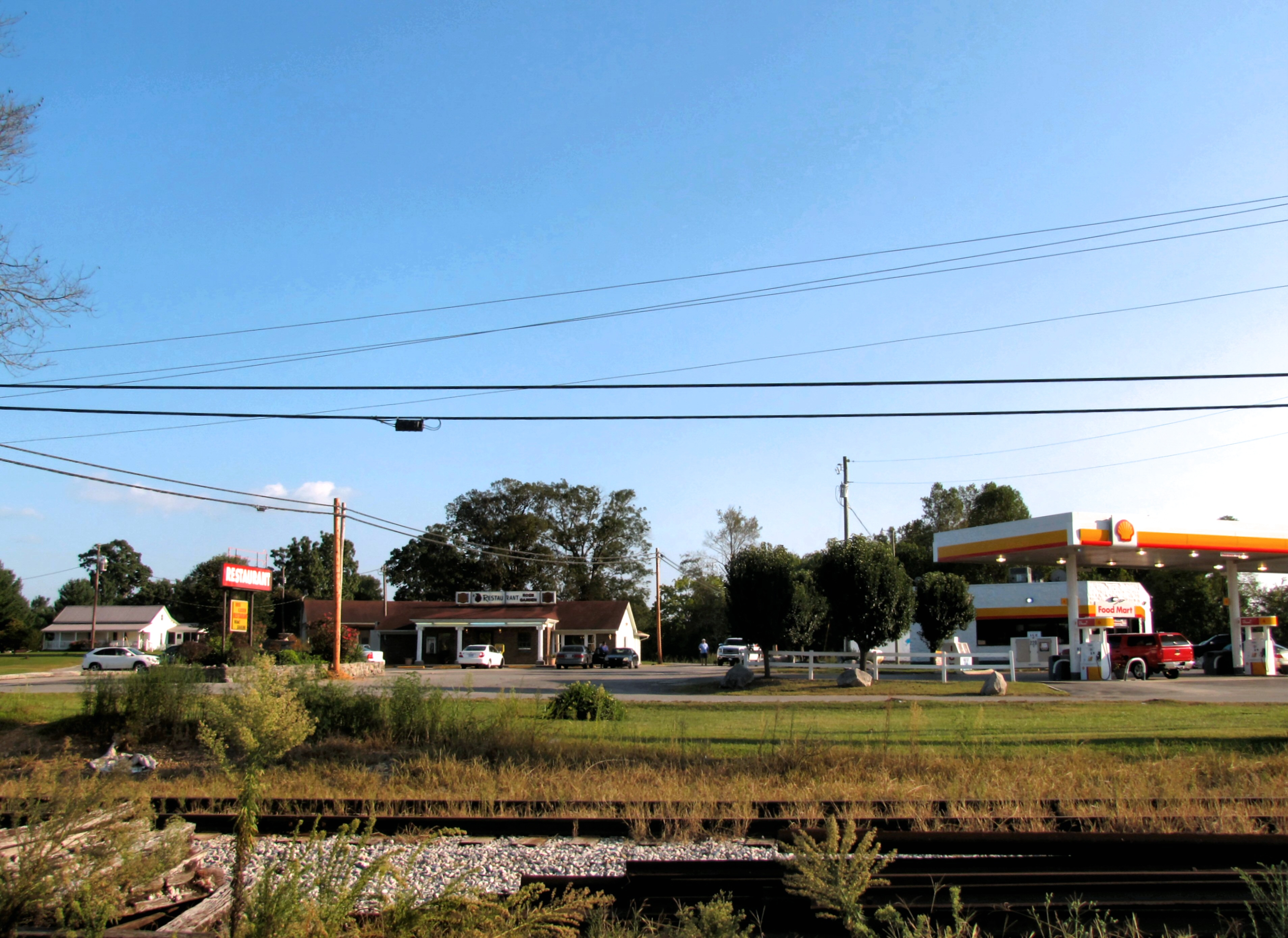
Businesses along Old Baxter Road in Silver Point

Silver Point is an unincorporated community in Putnam County, Tennessee, United States.

== Geography ==
Silver Point is mostly scattered around the intersection of Tennessee State Route 141, Tennessee State Route 56, and Interstate 40, about halfway between Cookeville and Smithville.

=== Landmarks ===
Notable features include the National Register of Historic Places-listed West End Church of Christ Silver Point. Edgar Evins State Park and Center Hill Lake are also nearby.

== Climate ==
Silver Point's climate is humid subtropical (Köppen Cfa, Trewartha Cf), giving the area mild winters and hot, humid summers.

Climate data for Silver Point, Tennessee (1981-2010 normals)
Month	Jan	Feb	Mar	Apr	May	Jun	Jul	Aug	Sep	Oct	Nov	Dec	Year
Mean daily maximum °F (°C)	46 (8)	51 (11)	60 (16)	70 (21)	77 (25)	85 (29)	88 (31)	88 (31)	82 (28)	71 (22)	62 (17)	49 (9)	69 (21)
Daily mean °F (°C)	38 (3)	41 (5)	49 (9)	59 (15)	67 (19)	76 (24)	79 (26)	78 (26)	72 (22)	61 (16)	53 (12)	40 (4)	59 (15)
Mean daily minimum °F (°C)	29 (−2)	31 (−1)	38 (3)	47 (8)	57 (14)	66 (19)	70 (21)	68 (20)	61 (16)	50 (10)	43 (6)	31 (−1)	49 (9)
Average precipitation inches (mm)	4.32 (110)	4.53 (115)	4.75 (121)	4.13 (105)	5.38 (137)	4.55 (116)	4.99 (127)	3.71 (94)	3.71 (94)	3.27 (83)	4.60 (117)	5.71 (145)	53.65 (1,364)
Source: "Monthly Average Temperatures and Precipitation in Silver Point". U.S. climate data. U.S. climate data.

== Notable people ==
Notable natives include journalist Christine Sadler and her brother James C. Sadler.
