= Tennessee State Route 146 =

State highway in Tennessee, United States

State Route 146
- SR 146 highlighted in red

Route information
- Maintained by TDOT
- Length: 17.2 mi (27.7 km)

Major junctions
- North end: US 70 in Smithville
- South end: US 70S in Bluewing

Location
- Country: United States
- State: Tennessee
- Counties: Cannon, DeKalb

Highway system
- Tennessee State Routes; Interstate; US; State
← SR 145	→ SR 147

State Route 146 (SR 146) is a relatively short north–south highway in Middle Tennessee. The road begins northwest of Centertown and ends in Smithville. The current length is 17.2 mi (27.7 km), shortened by approximately 0.19 mi (0.31 km) from the original length when US 70S was routed northward along a new four-lane alignment.

== Route description ==
SR 146 begins in Cannon County at an intersection with US 70S/SR 1 in the Bluewing community. It proceeds northward as Short Mountain Road, passing through the community of Center Hill, where it intersects SR 281. It continues north through farmland along the southeastern edge of the Highland Rim and turns east, then northeast as it moves around Short Mountain. After passing Short Mountain, SR 146 goes into DeKalb County as Short Mountain Highway, continuing northeast through Bluhmtown. It serves as the southern terminus of SR 83 before entering Smithville. Once in Smithville, SR 146 widens to four lanes with a center turn lane and becomes known as South Mountain Street. It continues northward through neighborhoods before entering a business district and coming to its northern terminus at US 70/SR 26 just south of downtown.

A former alignment of SR 146 saw the Cannon County portion extended further south from the current southern terminus by approximately 1,000 feet (300 m). This section was de-designated as SR 146 when US 70S was moved further north along a new four-lane alignment.

== Major intersections ==
County	Location	mi	km	Destinations	Notes
Cannon	Bluewing	0.0	0.0	US 70S (SR 1) – Woodbury, Centertown, McMinnville	Southern terminus
Cannon	Center Hill	2.0	3.2	SR 281 west (Center Hill Road)	Eastern terminus of SR 281
DeKalb	Bluhmtown	12.9	20.8	SR 83 north (New Home Road)	Southern terminus of SR 83
DeKalb	Smithville	17.2	27.7	US 70 (E/W Broad Street/SR 26) – Liberty, Dowelltown, Sparta	Northern terminus
1.000 mi = 1.609 km; 1.000 km = 0.621 mi
