= Gassaway =

Gassaway or the alternate spellings Gasaway or Gazaway may refer to:

== People ==
- Dan Gasaway (born 1966), American politician
- Nicholas Gassaway (1634–1691), American Colonel of the Provincial Maryland Forces, originator of the family name
- Percy Lee Gassaway (1885–1937), American congressman from Oklahoma
- Charlie Gassaway (1918–1992), American major league baseball player (pitcher)
- Henry Gassaway Davis (1823–1916), 1904 US Vice-Presidential Candidate and Senator from West Virginia
- Derrick Dodd, Pen name of American humorist and poet Frank Harrison Gassaway
- James Gazaway Ryals Jr. (1855–1885), American university president
- Victor Gazaway Willis (1876–1947), Major league baseball player nicknamed "the Georgia Peach"

== Places ==
- Gassaway, West Virginia, U.S.
- Gassaway, Tennessee, U.S.
