= Tennessee State Route 281 =

State highway in Tennessee, United States

State Route 281
- SR 281 highlighted in red

Route information
- Maintained by TDOT
- Length: 6.1 mi (9.8 km)
- Existed: July 1, 1983–present

Major junctions
- West end: SR 53 near Iconium
- US 70S in Bluewing
- East end: SR 146 in Center Hill

Location
- Country: United States
- State: Tennessee
- Counties: Cannon

Highway system
- Tennessee State Routes; Interstate; US; State
| ← SR 280 | → SR 282 |

State Route 281 (SR 281) is a 6.1-mile-long (9.8 km) east-west state highway in Cannon County, Tennessee that links the communities of Iconium, Bluewing, and Center Hill.

== Route description ==
SR 281 begins at an intersection with SR 53 just a few miles south of Woodbury. It winds its way east as Iconium Road to pass through farmland along the edge of the Highland Rim to pass through Iconium, where it becomes Manustown Road. The highway continues its way northeast to pass through Bluewing, where it has an intersection with US 70S/SR 1 and becomes Center Hill Road. SR 281 the curves to the east through more farmland to enter Center Hill, where it comes to an end at an intersection with SR 146. The entire route of SR 281 is a rural two-lane highway.

== Major intersections ==
The entire route is in Cannon County.

| Location | mi | km | Destinations | Notes |
|---|---|---|---|---|
| | 0.0 | 0.0 | SR 53 (Jim Cummings Highway) – Manchester, Woodbury | Western terminus |
| Bluewing | 4.3 | 6.9 | US 70S (McMinnville Highway/SR 1) – Woodbury, Centertown, McMinnville | |
| Center Hill | 6.1 | 9.8 | SR 146 (Short Mountain Road) – Smithville | Eastern terminus |
1.000 mi = 1.609 km; 1.000 km = 0.621 mi
