= Stone Hall =

Stone Hall can refer to:

China

- Stone Hall of Jijian Temple, Suzhou, Jiangsu Province

United States

- Stone Hall, Atlanta University, now known as Fountain Hall at Morris Brown College, listed on the National Register of Historic Places (NRHP) in Fulton County, Georgia
- Stone Hall (Cockeysville, Maryland), listed on the NRHP in Baltimore County, Maryland
- Stone Hall (Ithaca, New York), listed on the NRHP in Tompkins County, New York
- Stone Hall (Nashville, Tennessee), listed on the NRHP in Davidson County, Tennessee
