= George D. Waller =

American architect

- Born: 1883; Nashville, Tennessee, U.S.
- Died: December 19, 1969 (aged 85–86); Nashville, Tennessee, U.S.
- Resting place: Mount Olivet Cemetery
- Occupation: Architect
- Spouse: Julia Aubie Lasley
- Children: 2 sons

George D. Waller (1883 – December 19, 1969) was an American architect from Tennessee who designed churches, schools, houses and courthouses, some of which are listed on the National Register of Historic Places.

== Early life ==
Waller was born in 1883 in Nashville, Tennessee.

== Career ==
Waller began his architectural career supervising the design of Hume-Fogg High School in 1912. In 1922, he received the first "architect's license in the state of Tennessee." He also joined the American Institute of Architects and its Tennessee chapter.

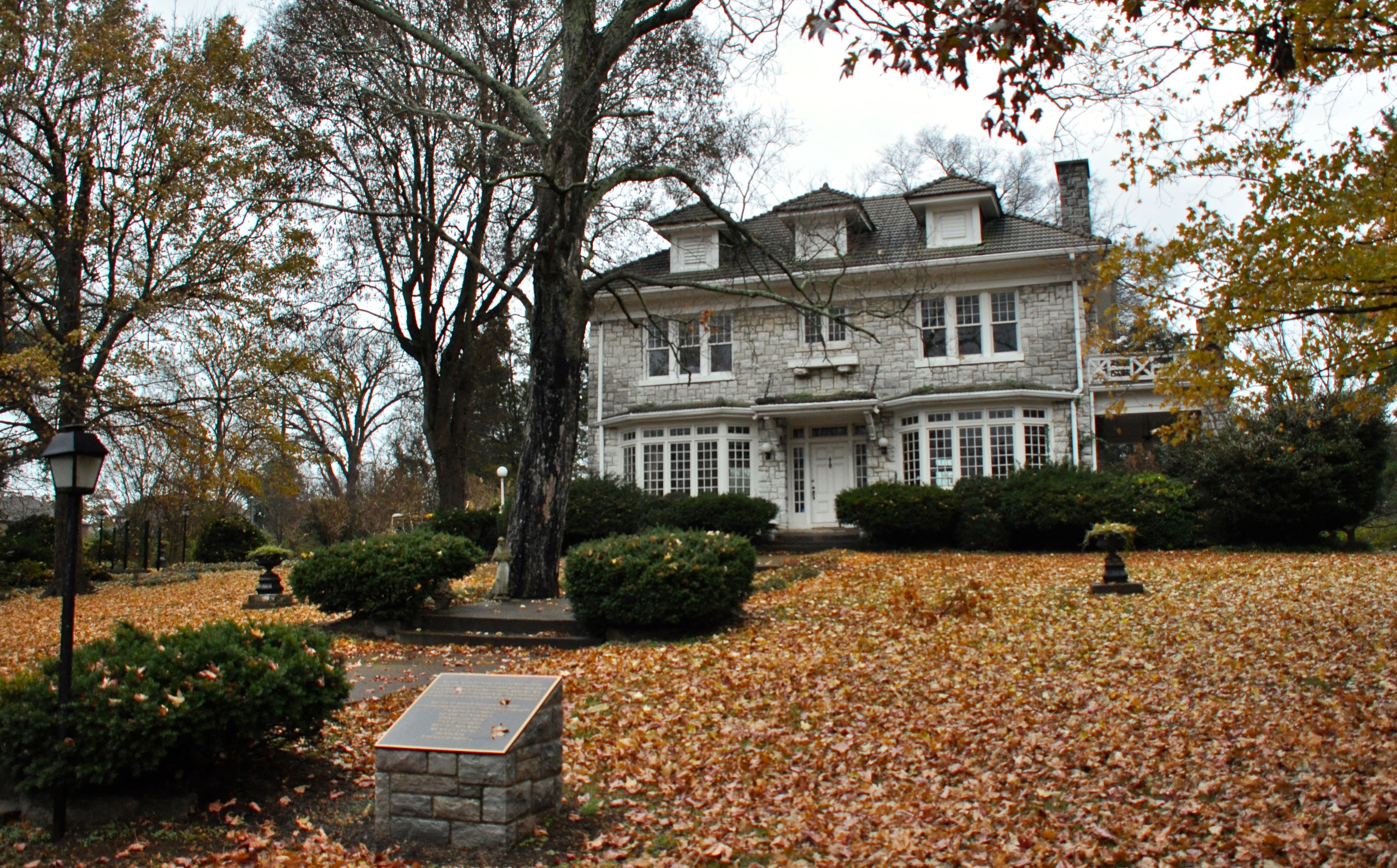
Stone Hall, designed by Waller.

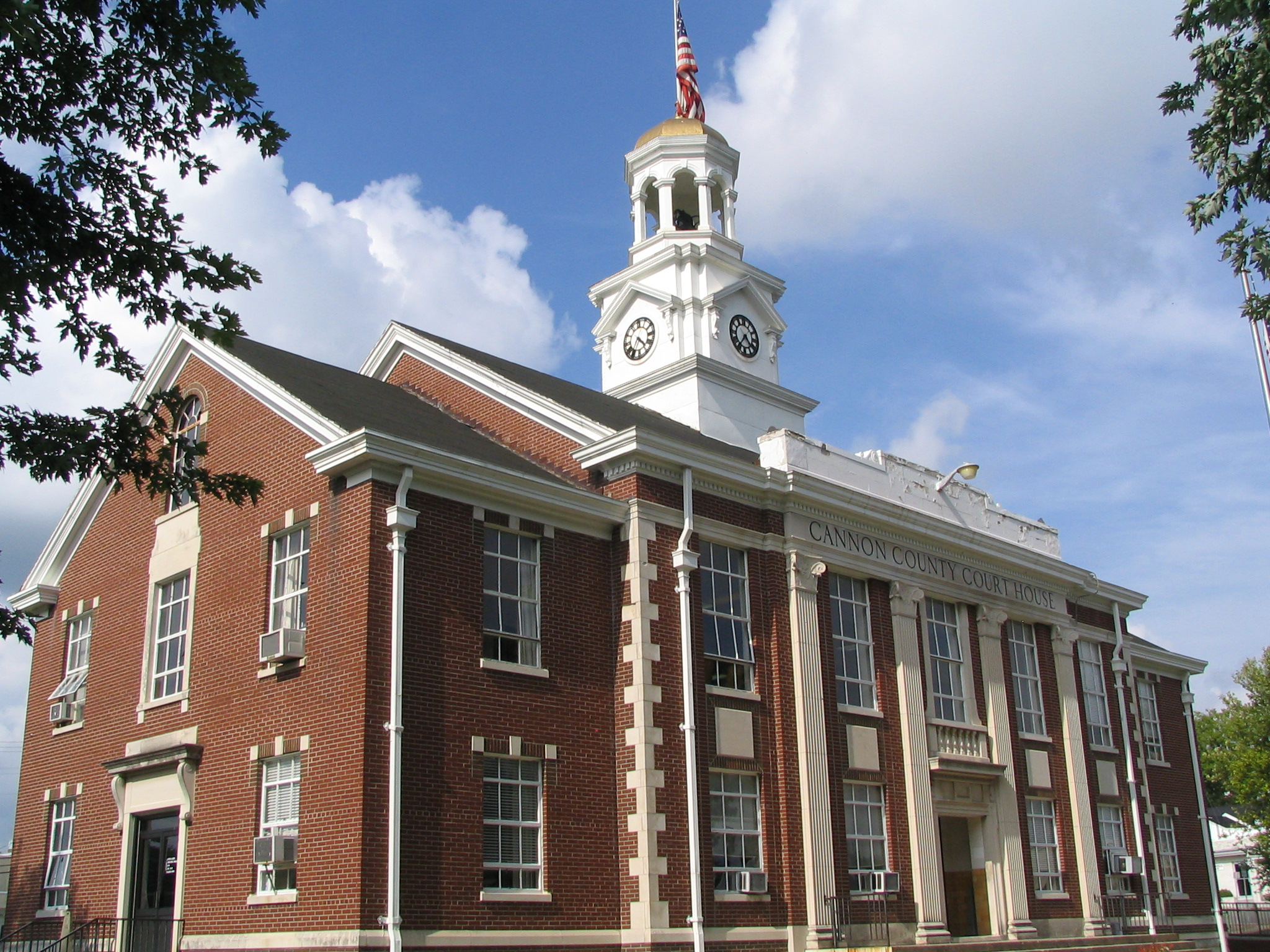
The Cannon County Court House, designed by Waller.

Waller designed various schools in Tennessee, Kentucky, Alabama, and Georgia. He also designed churches like the Belmont United Methodist Church, the Meridian Street United Methodist Church, and the Waverly Place United Methodist Church. He also designed Haynes Haven Farm in Spring Hill, now a training center for General Motors.

Waller designed at least two buildings listed on the National Register of Historic Places: Stone Hall in Nashville and the Cannon County Courthouse in Woodbury. His own house, located at 2527 West Ashwood Avenue, is listed as a contributing property to the Hillsboro-West End Historic District.

In the words of Christine Kreyling, Waller was “one of the last of Nashville’s architects with a thorough grasp of the ethos of the Grecian style.”

== Personal life and death ==
Waller married Julia Aubie Lasley. They had two sons, Louis and Raymond. He attended the Belmont United Methodist Church.

Waller died on December 19, 1969, in Nashville. He was buried in Mount Olivet Cemetery.
