= Iconium (disambiguation) =

Iconium is the Latin name of the ancient city of Konya, in Turkey.

Iconium may also refer to:

- Iconium (Roman Catholic titular see), from the 1st century, in Lycaonia, in present-day Turkey
- Iconium, Iowa, an unincorporated community in Appanoose County
- Iconium, Missouri, an unincorporated community in St. Clair County
- Iconium, Tennessee, an unincorporated community in Cannon County
