= 2004 United States presidential election in Tennessee =

- November 2, 2004
- Turnout: 66.32% (▲3.29 pp)

Nominee	George W. Bush	John Kerry
Party	Republican	Democratic
Home state	Texas	Massachusetts
Running mate	Dick Cheney	John Edwards
Electoral vote	11	0
Popular vote	1,384,375	1,036,477
Percentage	56.81%	42.51%

Bush
40–50%
50–60%
60–70%
70–80%
80–90%
90–100%
Kerry
40–50%
50–60%
60–70%
70–80%
80–90%
90–100%
Tie/No data
President before election
George W. Bush
Republican
Elected President
George W. Bush
Republican

The 2004 United States presidential election in Tennessee was held on November 2, 2004, and was part of the 2004 United States presidential election. Voters chose 11 representatives, or electors, to the Electoral College, who voted for president and vice president.

Tennessee was won by incumbent President George W. Bush by a 14.30% margin of victory. Prior to the election, all 12 news organizations considered this a state Bush would win, or otherwise a red state. In the past 14 presidential elections, the Republican nominee won ten of them. The state trended more Republican by 10.43 points from Bush's performance in 2000. Bush won most of the counties and congressional districts in the state. Third-party and independent candidates made up just 0.68% of the vote.

As of 2024, this is the last time that the following counties have voted Democratic in a presidential election: Trousdale County, Humphreys County, Grundy County, Lake County, Benton County, Overton County, Smith County, Lauderdale County, Van Buren County, Stewart County, Perry County, and Clay County.

== Primary elections ==
=== Democratic primary ===
2004 Tennessee Democratic presidential primary
- February 10, 2004

85 Democratic National Convention delegates (69 pledged, 16 unpledged) The number of pledged delegates received is determined by the popular vote
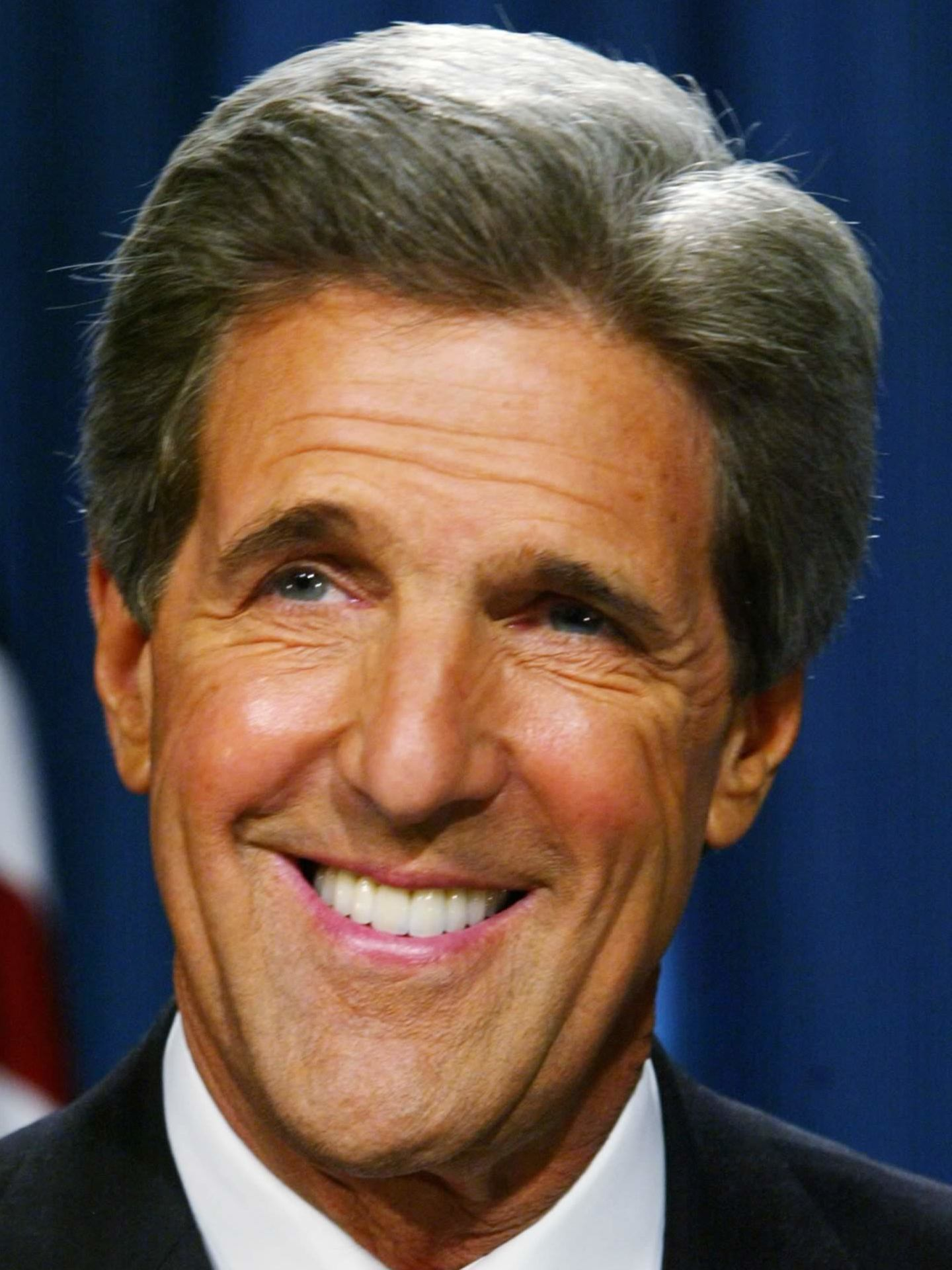

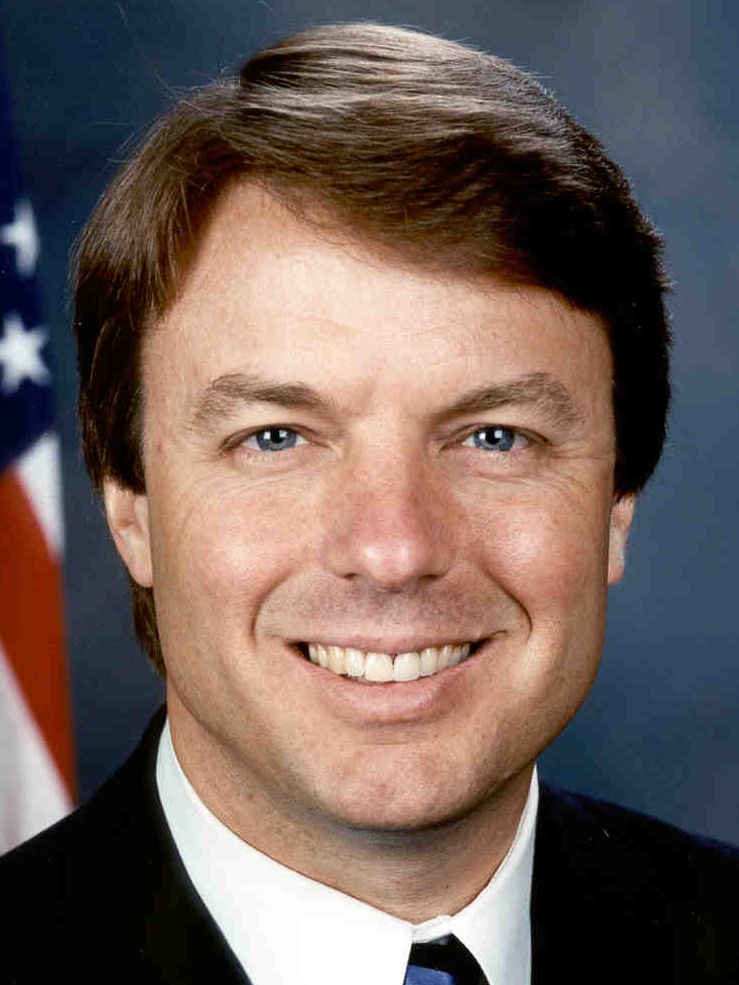

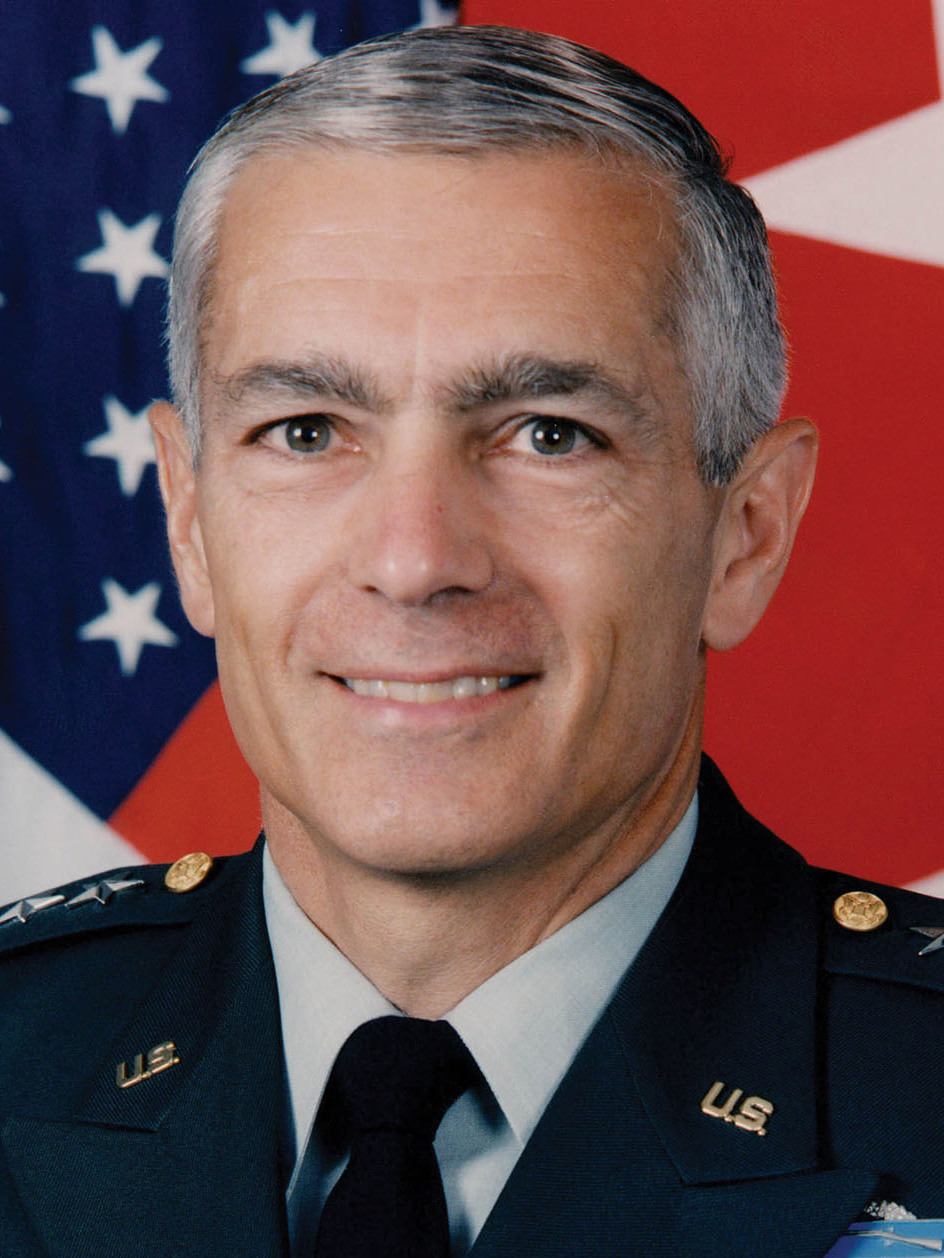
Candidate	John Kerry	John Edwards
Home state	Massachusetts	North Carolina
Delegate count	31	20
Popular vote	151,527	97,914
Percentage	41.02%	26.51%
Candidate	Wesley Clark
Home state	Arkansas
Delegate count	18
Popular vote	85,315
Percentage	23.10%
- County results Kerry 30–40% 40–50% 50–60% Edwards 30–40%

The 2004 Tennessee Democratic presidential primary was held on February 10, 2004. John Kerry won with 41.0% of the vote and was awarded 31 delegates. John Edwards came second with 26.5% of the vote and 20 delegates. Wesley Clark came third with 23.1% of the vote and 18 delegates. All other candidates did not receive any delegates

2004 Tennessee Democratic presidential primary
Party	Candidate	Votes	Percentage	Delegates
Democratic	John Kerry	151,527	41.02%	31
Democratic	John Edwards	97,914	26.51%	20
Democratic	Wesley Clark	85,315	23.10%	18
Democratic	Howard Dean (withdrawn)	16,128	4.37%	0
Democratic	Al Sharpton	6,107	1.65%	0
Democratic	Joe Lieberman	3,213	0.87%	0
Democratic	Uncommitted	2,727	0.74%	0
Democratic	Carol Moseley Braun (withdrawn)	2,490	0.67%	0
Democratic	Dennis Kucinich	2,279	0.62%	0
Democratic	Dick Gephardt (withdrawn)	1,402	0.38%	0
Democratic	Lyndon LaRouche	283	0.08%	0
Totals		626,738	100.00%	69

=== Republican primary ===
2004 Tennessee Republican presidential primary
- February 10, 2004

52 pledged delegates to the; 2004 Republican National Convention

Candidate	George W. Bush	Uncommitted
Home state	Texas	n/a
Delegate count	52	0
Popular vote	94,557	4,504
Percentage	95.45%	4.55%
- County results Bush: 85% 90% 95%

The 2004 Tennessee Republican presidential primary was held on February 10, 2004. Incumbent president George W. Bush won the primary and all of the state's delegates.

2004 Tennessee Republican presidential primary
Candidate	Votes	%	Delegates
George W. Bush (incumbent)	94,557	95.45%	52
Write-ins	4,504	4.55%	
Total	99,061	100.00%	52

== General election ==
=== Predictions ===
There were 12 news organizations who made state-by-state predictions of the election. Here are their last predictions before election day.

Source	Ranking
D.C. Political Report	Lean R
Associated Press	Lean R
CNN	Likely R
Cook Political Report	Lean R
Newsweek	Solid R
New York Times	Solid R
Rasmussen Reports	Likely R
Research 2000	Solid R
Washington Post	Likely R
Washington Times	Solid R
Zogby International	Likely R
Washington Dispatch	Likely R

=== Polling ===
Bush won every single pre-election poll, and won each with at least 49%. The final 3 polls averaged Bush leading 56% to 40%.

=== Fundraising ===
Bush raised $4,636,916. Kerry raised $1,187,742.

=== Advertising and visits ===
Neither campaign advertised or visited this state during the fall election.

United States presidential election in Tennessee, 2004
Party	Candidate	Running mate	Votes	Percentage	Electoral votes
Republican	George W. Bush (incumbent)	Dick Cheney (incumbent)	1,384,375	56.81%	11
Democratic	John Kerry	John Edwards	1,036,477	42.51%	0
Independent	Ralph Nader	Peter Camejo	8,992	0.37%	0
Libertarian	Michael Badnarik	Richard Campagna	4,866	0.20%	0
Constitution Party	Michael Peroutka	Chuck Baldwin	2,570	0.11%	0
Green Party	David Cobb	Pat LaMarche	33	0.00%	0
Socialist	Walt Brown	Mary Alice Herbert	6	0.00%	0
Totals			2,437,919	100.00%	11
Voter turnout					66.32%

=== By county ===
County	George W. Bush Republican		John Kerry Democratic		Various candidates Other parties		Margin		Total
County	#	%	#	%	#	%	#	%	Total
Anderson	18,510	58.42%	12,896	40.70%	276	0.87%	5,614	17.72%	31,682
Bedford	8,351	60.93%	5,268	38.44%	87	0.63%	3,083	22.49%	13,706
Benton	3,161	44.58%	3,869	54.57%	60	0.85%	-708	-9.99%	7,090
Bledsoe	2,849	59.24%	1,927	40.07%	33	0.69%	922	19.17%	4,809
Blount	33,241	68.24%	15,047	30.89%	424	0.88%	18,194	37.35%	48,712
Bradley	25,951	72.82%	9,431	26.46%	255	0.72%	16,520	46.36%	35,637
Campbell	7,859	55.67%	6,163	43.65%	96	0.68%	1,696	12.02%	14,118
Cannon	2,931	53.48%	2,515	45.89%	35	0.64%	416	7.59%	5,481
Carroll	6,605	56.18%	5,070	43.12%	82	0.70%	1,535	13.06%	11,757
Carter	15,768	70.67%	6,395	28.66%	150	0.67%	9,373	42.01%	22,313
Cheatham	9,676	61.64%	5,918	37.70%	103	0.66%	3,758	23.94%	15,697
Chester	4,086	64.28%	2,242	35.27%	29	0.45%	1,844	29.01%	6,357
Claiborne	6,448	61.18%	4,034	38.27%	58	0.55%	2,414	22.91%	10,540
Clay	1,650	49.15%	1,675	49.90%	32	0.96%	-25	-0.75%	3,357
Cocke	8,297	67.40%	3,935	31.96%	79	0.65%	4,362	35.44%	12,311
Coffee	11,793	58.48%	8,243	40.87%	131	0.65%	3,550	17.61%	20,167
Crockett	3,242	56.66%	2,459	42.97%	21	0.37%	783	13.69%	5,722
Cumberland	15,144	64.07%	8,327	35.23%	166	0.70%	6,817	28.84%	23,637
Davidson	107,839	44.51%	132,737	54.78%	1,726	0.71%	-24,898	-10.27%	242,302
Decatur	2,566	52.59%	2,268	46.48%	45	0.92%	298	6.11%	4,879
DeKalb	3,685	51.37%	3,445	48.03%	43	0.60%	240	3.34%	7,173
Dickson	10,567	54.76%	8,597	44.55%	134	0.69%	1,970	10.21%	19,298
Dyer	8,447	61.17%	5,287	38.29%	75	0.54%	3,160	22.88%	13,809
Fayette	8,962	60.81%	5,696	38.65%	79	0.53%	3,266	22.16%	14,737
Fentress	4,293	64.07%	2,371	35.39%	36	0.54%	1,922	28.68%	6,700
Franklin	9,129	53.46%	7,800	45.68%	148	0.87%	1,329	7.78%	17,077
Gibson	10,596	55.13%	8,511	44.28%	114	0.59%	2,085	10.85%	19,221
Giles	6,163	53.42%	5,273	45.71%	101	0.87%	890	7.71%	11,537
Grainger	4,907	65.19%	2,569	34.13%	51	0.68%	2,338	31.06%	7,527
Greene	16,382	67.71%	7,635	31.56%	177	0.73%	8,747	36.15%	24,194
Grundy	2,107	42.75%	2,789	56.58%	33	0.67%	-682	-13.83%	4,929
Hamblen	14,742	66.05%	7,433	33.30%	143	0.64%	7,309	32.75%	22,318
Hamilton	78,547	57.36%	57,302	41.85%	1,087	0.79%	21,245	15.51%	136,936
Hancock	1,756	68.84%	777	30.46%	18	0.69%	979	38.38%	2,551
Hardeman	4,704	44.95%	5,685	54.32%	77	0.74%	-981	-9.37%	10,466
Hardin	6,087	61.15%	3,834	38.52%	33	0.33%	2,253	22.63%	9,954
Hawkins	13,447	66.46%	6,684	33.04%	102	0.51%	6,763	33.42%	20,233
Haywood	3,140	41.60%	4,359	57.75%	49	0.65%	-1,219	-16.15%	7,548
Henderson	6,585	65.22%	3,448	34.15%	63	0.63%	3,137	31.07%	10,096
Henry	7,340	55.70%	5,732	43.50%	105	0.80%	1,608	12.20%	13,177
Hickman	4,359	50.26%	4,263	49.15%	51	0.59%	96	1.11%	8,673
Houston	1,440	40.02%	2,126	59.09%	32	0.89%	-686	-19.07%	3,598
Humphreys	3,261	41.85%	4,485	57.55%	47	0.60%	-1,224	-15.70%	7,793
Jackson	2,026	40.07%	2,998	59.30%	32	0.64%	-972	-19.23%	5,056
Jefferson	11,625	67.53%	5,469	31.77%	121	0.70%	6,156	35.76%	17,215
Johnson	4,634	71.51%	1,812	27.96%	34	0.53%	2,822	43.55%	6,480
Knox	110,803	62.10%	66,013	37.00%	1,603	0.90%	44,790	25.10%	178,419
Lake	1,039	43.84%	1,317	55.57%	14	0.59%	-278	-11.73%	2,370
Lauderdale	4,164	47.96%	4,474	51.53%	44	0.51%	-310	-3.57%	8,682
Lawrence	9,959	59.79%	6,592	39.57%	107	0.64%	3,367	20.22%	16,658
Lewis	2,819	55.78%	2,192	43.37%	43	0.85%	627	12.41%	5,054
Lincoln	7,829	62.85%	4,546	36.49%	82	0.66%	3,283	26.36%	12,457
Loudon	14,041	70.69%	5,708	28.74%	115	0.58%	8,333	41.95%	19,864
McMinn	11,980	66.54%	5,891	32.72%	132	0.73%	6,089	33.82%	18,003
McNairy	5,787	58.31%	4,101	41.32%	36	0.36%	1,686	16.99%	9,924
Macon	4,670	62.83%	2,738	36.84%	25	0.34%	1,932	25.99%	7,433
Madison	21,679	56.05%	16,840	43.54%	156	0.40%	4,839	12.51%	38,675
Marion	5,862	51.01%	5,548	48.28%	82	0.71%	314	2.73%	11,492
Marshall	5,825	54.88%	4,722	44.48%	68	0.64%	1,103	10.40%	10,615
Maury	17,505	58.27%	12,379	41.20%	159	0.53%	5,126	17.07%	30,043
Meigs	2,500	60.50%	1,595	38.60%	37	0.90%	905	21.90%	4,132
Monroe	10,123	65.02%	5,354	34.39%	91	0.58%	4,769	30.63%	15,568
Montgomery	28,627	58.42%	20,070	40.96%	301	0.61%	8,557	17.46%	48,998
Moore	1,668	60.13%	1,084	39.08%	22	0.79%	584	21.05%	2,774
Morgan	4,401	59.80%	2,924	39.73%	35	0.48%	1,477	20.07%	7,360
Obion	7,859	58.06%	5,549	41.00%	127	0.94%	2,310	17.06%	13,535
Overton	3,941	46.31%	4,518	53.09%	51	0.60%	-577	-6.78%	8,510
Perry	1,522	48.32%	1,579	50.13%	49	1.55%	-57	-1.81%	3,150
Pickett	1,600	60.49%	1,033	39.05%	12	0.46%	567	21.44%	2,645
Polk	3,924	58.57%	2,724	40.66%	52	0.77%	1,200	17.91%	6,700
Putnam	15,637	59.14%	10,566	39.96%	239	0.91%	5,071	19.18%	26,442
Rhea	7,301	66.05%	3,665	33.16%	88	0.79%	3,636	32.89%	11,054
Roane	14,467	61.99%	8,706	37.30%	165	0.70%	5,761	24.69%	23,338
Robertson	15,331	60.54%	9,865	38.96%	127	0.50%	5,466	21.58%	25,323
Rutherford	52,200	61.84%	31,647	37.49%	562	0.67%	20,553	24.35%	84,409
Scott	4,509	59.11%	3,086	40.46%	33	0.44%	1,423	18.65%	7,628
Sequatchie	2,951	59.22%	1,986	39.86%	46	0.92%	965	19.36%	4,983
Sevier	22,143	71.50%	8,621	27.84%	206	0.67%	13,522	43.66%	30,970
Shelby	158,137	41.91%	216,945	57.50%	2,200	0.58%	-58,808	-15.59%	377,282
Smith	3,739	47.76%	4,044	51.66%	45	0.57%	-305	-3.90%	7,828
Stewart	2,675	47.91%	2,860	51.23%	48	0.86%	-185	-3.32%	5,583
Sullivan	42,555	67.94%	19,637	31.35%	447	0.72%	22,918	36.59%	62,639
Sumner	40,181	64.84%	21,458	34.63%	329	0.53%	18,723	30.21%	61,968
Tipton	14,178	65.41%	7,379	34.04%	120	0.56%	6,799	31.37%	21,677
Trousdale	1,314	41.18%	1,851	58.01%	26	0.82%	-537	-16.83%	3,191
Unicoi	5,030	67.40%	2,374	31.81%	59	0.80%	2,656	35.59%	7,463
Union	4,145	61.77%	2,524	37.62%	41	0.61%	1,621	24.15%	6,710
Van Buren	1,120	47.72%	1,209	51.51%	18	0.76%	-89	-3.79%	2,347
Warren	7,503	52.10%	6,808	47.28%	89	0.62%	695	4.82%	14,400
Washington	29,735	66.07%	14,944	33.20%	327	0.73%	14,791	32.87%	45,006
Wayne	3,999	66.83%	1,951	32.60%	34	0.56%	2,048	34.23%	5,984
Weakley	7,817	57.92%	5,588	41.40%	91	0.67%	2,229	16.52%	13,496
White	5,269	55.49%	4,147	43.68%	79	0.84%	1,122	11.81%	9,495
Williamson	57,451	72.13%	21,732	27.28%	467	0.59%	35,719	44.85%	79,650
Wilson	28,924	65.07%	15,277	34.37%	251	0.56%	13,647	30.70%	44,452
Totals	1,383,336	56.81%	1,035,160	42.51%	16,453	0.68%	348,176	14.30%	2,434,949

==== Counties that flipped from Democratic to Republican ====
- Bedford (Largest city: Shelbyville)
- Campbell (Largest city: LaFollette)
- Cannon (Largest city: Woodbury)
- Crockett (Largest city: Bells)
- Decatur (Largest city: Parsons)
- DeKalb (Largest city: Smithville)
- Dickson (Largest city: Dickson)
- Franklin (Largest city: Winchester)
- Gibson (Largest city: Humboldt)
- Giles (Largest city: Pulaski)
- Henry (Largest city: Paris)
- Hickman (Largest city: Centerville)
- Lewis (Largest city: Hohenwald)
- Marion (Largest city: Jasper)
- Marshall (Largest city: Lewisburg)
- Robertson (Largest city: Springfield)
- Warren (Largest city: McMinnville)
- White (Largest city: Sparta)

=== By congressional district ===
Bush won seven of nine congressional districts, including three held by Democrats.

District	Bush	Kerry	Representative
1st	68%	31%	William L Jenkins
2nd	64%	35%	John J. Duncan Jr.
3rd	61%	38%	Zach Wamp
4th	58%	41%	Lincoln Davis
5th	48%	52%	Jim Cooper
6th	60%	40%	Bart Gordon
7th	66%	33%	Marsha Blackburn
8th	53%	47%	John S. Tanner
9th	30%	70%	Harold Ford Jr.

== Electors ==
Technically the voters of Tennessee cast their ballots for electors: representatives to the Electoral College. Tennessee is allocated 11 electors because it has 9 congressional districts and 2 senators. All candidates who appear on the ballot or qualify to receive write-in votes must submit a list of 11 electors, who pledge to vote for their candidate and his or her running mate. Whoever wins the majority of votes in the state is awarded all 11 electoral votes. Their chosen electors then vote for president and vice president. Although electors are pledged to their candidate and running mate, they are not obligated to vote for them. An elector who votes for someone other than his or her candidate is known as a faithless elector.

The electors of each state and the District of Columbia met on December 13, 2004, to cast their votes for president and vice president. The Electoral College itself never meets as one body. Instead the electors from each state and the District of Columbia met in their respective capitols.

The following were the members of the Electoral College from the state. All 9 were pledged to Bush/Cheney:

1. Susan Anderson
2. Betty Cannon
3. Winfield Dunn
4. Geneva Williams Harrison
5. Brock Hill
6. Bruce Montgomery
7. Claude Ramsey
8. Bob Rial
9. John Ryder
10. Mark Tipps
11. Sally Wall

== Analysis ==
While the Republicans control slightly more than half of the state, Democrats have strong support in the cities of Memphis and Nashville and in parts of Middle Tennessee and in West Tennessee north and east of Memphis The latter area includes a large rural African-American population.

Despite Tennessee being a swing state from the 1950s to the 2000s, it was not seriously contested in 2004. Vice President Al Gore, a former U.S. Senator from Tennessee, lost his home state in 2000 albeit by a thin margin. The majority of voters support for Republican George W. Bush increased in 2004, with his margin of victory in the state increasing from 4% in 2000 to 14% in 2004. Southern Democratic nominees (e.g., Lyndon B. Johnson, Jimmy Carter, Bill Clinton) usually fare better in Tennessee, especially among split-ticket voters outside the metropolitan areas.

As of the 2024 presidential election, this is the last election in which Trousdale County, Humphreys County, Grundy County, Lake County, Benton County, Overton County, Smith County, Lauderdale County, Van Buren County, Stewart County, Perry County, and Clay County voted for the Democratic candidate, as John McCain would outperform Bush in the state four years later.

== See also ==
- Presidency of George W. Bush
- 2004 Tennessee elections
- 2004 United States elections
