= Bluewing, Tennessee =

- Unincorporated community
- Location within Tennessee Location within the United States
- Coordinates: 35°47′09″N 85°59′30″W
- Country: United States
- State: Tennessee
- County: Cannon
- Elevation: 1,168 ft (356 m)
- Time zone: UTC-6 (Central (CST))
  - Summer (DST): UTC-5 (CDT)
- Area code: 615
- GNIS feature ID: 1314705

Bluewing is an unincorporated community in Cannon County, Tennessee, United States. Bluewing is located at the junction of U.S. Route 70S, Tennessee State Route 1, and Tennessee State Route 281 5.3 miles (8.5 km) east-southeast of Woodbury. Tennessee State Route 146 also passes through the southern edge of the community.
