= Cannon County Courthouse =

- U.S. National Register of Historic Places
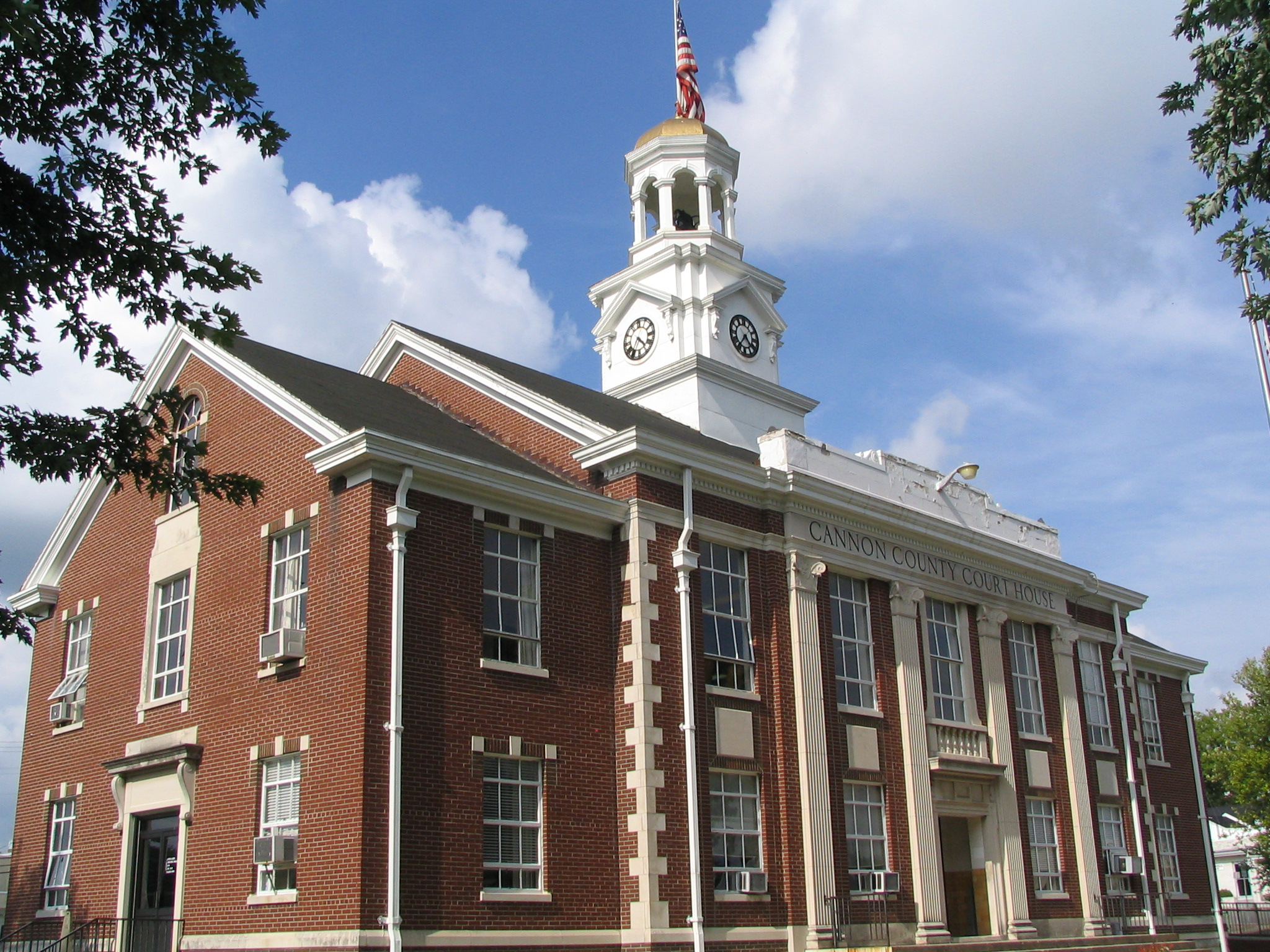

- Location within Tennessee Location within the United States
- Interactive map showing the location of Cannon County Courthouse
- Location: Woodbury, Tennessee
- Coordinates: 35°49′42″N 86°4′15″W
- Built: 1935
- Built by: Bell Bros.
- Architect: George D. Waller
- Architectural style: Colonial Revival
- NRHP reference No.: 92000347
- Added to NRHP: April 14, 1992

The Cannon County Courthouse located at Court Square in Woodbury, Tennessee, is an historic building and the center of county government in Cannon County.

The building was constructed in 1935 to replace the county's 1838 courthouse, which burned in 1934. The courthouse is built in the Colonial Revival style. The architect was George Waller of Nashville.

The courthouse was added to the National Register of Historic Places on April 14, 1992. In 2010, the city of Woodbury and Cannon County completed a project to revitalize the surrounding courthouse square with new sidewalks, underground utility lines, new landscaping, and other improvements. The project was supported by a transportation enhancement grant awarded by the Tennessee Department of Transportation.

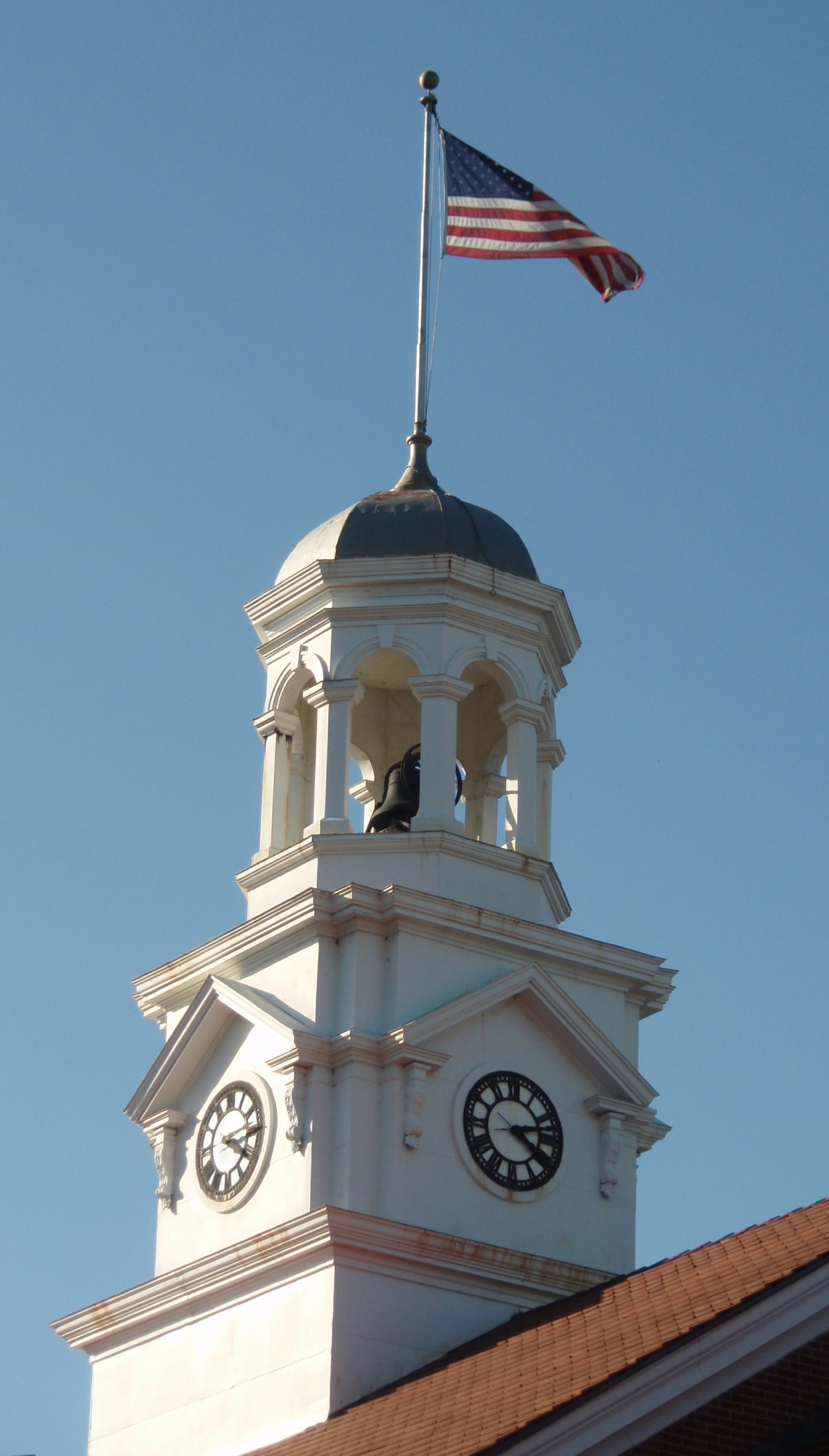
Courthouse clocktower
