= Midway, Cannon County, Tennessee =

Midway
- Unincorporated community
- Location within Tennessee Location within the United States
- Coordinates: 35°39′30″N 86°03′55″W
- Country: United States
- State: Tennessee
- County: Cannon
- Elevation: 1,135 ft (346 m)
- Time zone: UTC-6 (Central (CST))
  - Summer (DST): UTC-5 (CDT)
- Area code: 615
- GNIS feature ID: 1647261

Midway is an unincorporated community in Cannon County, Tennessee, United States. Midway is located on Tennessee State Route 53 in southern Cannon County, 11.7 miles (18.8 km) south of Woodbury.
