= Tennessee State Route 83 =

State highway in Tennessee, United States

State Route 83

Route information
- Maintained by TDOT
- Length: 7.7 mi (12.4 km)

Major junctions
- South end: SR 146 in Bluhmtown
- US 70 in Smithville
- North end: SR 56 in Smithville

Location
- Country: United States
- State: Tennessee
- Counties: DeKalb

Highway system
- Tennessee State Routes; Interstate; US; State
← SR 82	→ SR 84

State Route 83 (SR 83) is a short north–south highway in DeKalb County, Tennessee. The road begins near Bluhmtown and ends north of Smithville. The current length is 7.7 mi (12.4 km).

== Route description ==
SR 83 begins at SR 146 in the small community of Bluhmtown. It proceeds north as New Home Road and intersects with U.S. Route 70 (US 70) and SR 26 on the west side of Smithville. After the intersection, SR 83 becomes Allen Ferry Road and goes east-northeastward to its northern terminus at SR 56 in northern Smithville.

== Major intersections ==
The entire route is in DeKalb County.

Location	mi	km	Destinations	Notes
Bluhmtown	0.0	0.0	SR 146 (Short Mountain Highway) – Centertown, Smithville	Southern terminus
Smithville	4.4	7.1	US 70 (Nashville Highway/SR 26) – Dowelltown, Liberty, Sparta	
Smithville	7.7	12.4	SR 56 (Cookeville Highway) – McMinnville, Silver Point	Northern terminus
1.000 mi = 1.609 km; 1.000 km = 0.621 mi
