= Charlie Gassaway =

American baseball player (1918–1992)

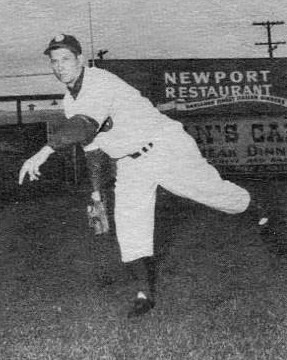
- Gassaway in 1947
- Pitcher
- Born: August 12, 1918; Gassaway, Tennessee, U.S.
- Died: January 15, 1992 (aged 73); Miami, Florida, U.S.
- Batted: Left Threw: Left

MLB debut
- September 25, 1944, for the Chicago Cubs

Last MLB appearance
- September 20, 1946, for the Cleveland Indians

MLB statistics
- Win–loss record: 5–9
- Earned run average: 4.04
- Strikeouts: 80
- Stats at Baseball Reference

Teams
- Chicago Cubs (1944); Philadelphia Athletics (1945); Cleveland Indians (1946)

Charles Cason Gassaway (August 12, 1918 – January 15, 1992), nicknamed "Sheriff", was an American professional baseball player, a left-handed pitcher whose 16-season (1937–52) playing career included all or parts of three seasons in Major League Baseball for the Chicago Cubs (1944), Philadelphia Athletics (1945), and Cleveland Indians (1946). Born in Gassaway, Tennessee, he stood 6 feet 2 inches (1.88 m) tall and weighed 210 pounds (95 kg).

Gassaway won 153 games in minor league baseball, with a career high of 17 victories in 1944 for the Milwaukee Brewers of the top-level American Association. He was called up to the Cubs and made two late-season starts but was ineffective. The 1945 season — the last year of the World War II player shortage — was Gassaway's only complete year in the Majors. Pitching for the last-place Philadelphia Athletics, he worked in 24 games pitched (including 11 starting assignments) and 118 innings, and posted a 4–7 record with an earned run average of 3.74 and four complete games. He split 1946 between the MLB Indians and the Triple-A Oakland Oaks, working in 13 games for Cleveland (with six more starts) from July through the end of the season. He then returned to the minors for the remainder of his active career, and spent nine years as a minor league manager, working mostly for the Philadelphia Phillies' organization.

During his MLB career, Gassaway appeared in 39 games (with 19 starting assignments) and 180 1/3 innings pitched, allowing 188 hits and 91 bases on balls. He struck out 80 and registered four complete games.
