= Sugar Tree Knob, Tennessee =

- Unincorporated community
- Location within Tennessee Location within the United States
- Coordinates: 35°51′55″N 85°59′45″W
- Country: United States
- State: Tennessee
- County: Cannon
- Elevation: 1,161 ft (354 m)
- Time zone: UTC-6 (Central (CST))
  - Summer (DST): UTC-5 (CDT)
- Area code: 615
- GNIS feature ID: 1643642

Sugar Tree Knob is an unincorporated community in Cannon County, Tennessee, United States located on a landform of the same name in the western foothills of Short Mountain.
