= Iconium, Tennessee =

- Unincorporated community
- Location within Tennessee Location within the United States
- Coordinates: 35°46′34″N 86°01′18″W
- Country: United States
- State: Tennessee
- County: Cannon
- Elevation: 1,201 ft (366 m)
- Time zone: UTC-6 (Central (CST))
  - Summer (DST): UTC-5 (CDT)
- Area code: 615
- GNIS feature ID: 1288895

Iconium is an unincorporated community in Cannon County, Tennessee, United States. Iconium is located on Tennessee State Route 281 4.5 miles (7.2 km) southeast of Woodbury.

The community may be named after the ancient city of Konya (Latin: Iconium), in Turkey.
