= Stone Hall of Jijian Temple =

Temple in Suzhou, China

Coordinates: 31°17′54″N 120°28′27″E

The Stone Hall of Jijian Temple (Chinese: 寂鉴寺) is located on Tianchi Mountain in Suzhou, Jiangsu Province, China. It was classified by the Jiangsu Provincial-level Cultural Relics Protection Unit in 1957 and placed in the sixth batch of Major Site Protected for Its Historical and Cultural Value at the National Level in 2006.

Jijian Temple was built in the Zhizheng era, under the reign of Ukhaantu Khan, Emperor Huizong of Yuan in the Yuan Dynasty (1357) and converted to a temple after the Ming Dynasty. The existing stone palace niche for Buddha and statues were all built in the Yuan Dynasty.

Facing south and with a width of 7.64 meters (面阔三间) and a depth of 5.52 meters (进深二间), the stone hall has a unique Chinese-style roof and the back of the hall is next to a cliff. The east side and west side of the stone hall each have one stone chamber.

The two chambers are constructed next to the niche of Buddha, titled "Doushai Palace" and "Jile Palace". They are both stone houses built with wood in Baosha-style, one room in width and half a step in depth. The west stone chamber has a double-eaved roof with Amitabha Buddha statues in it while the east one has a single eave roof with Maitreya Buddha statues in it.
