= Stone Hall, Nashville =

Historic house in Tennessee, United States

- Stone Hall
- U.S. National Register of Historic Places
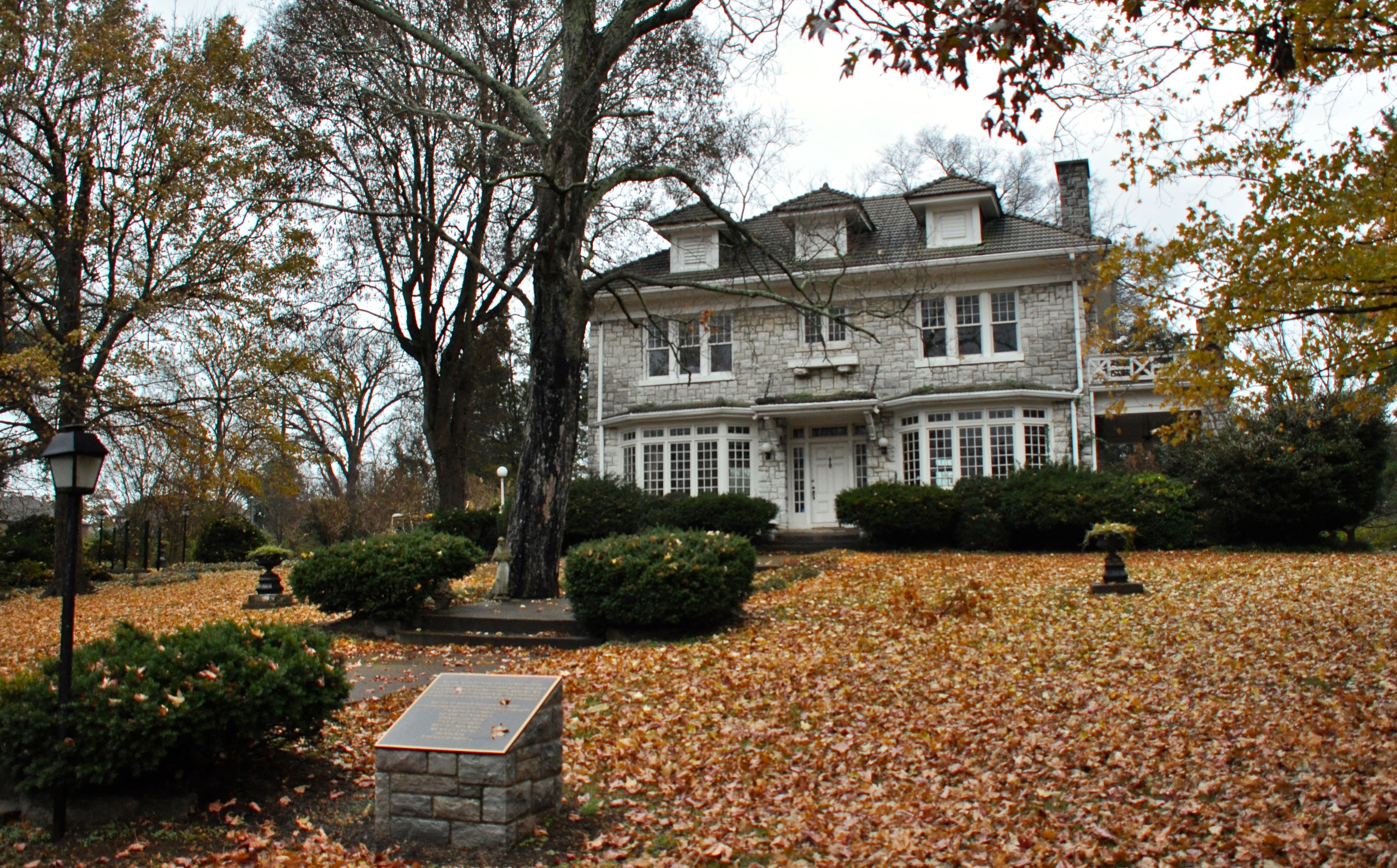
- Stone Hall in 2014

- Location within Tennessee Location within the United States
- Location: 1014 Stones River Road Nashville, Tennessee, US
- Coordinates: 36.1880°N 86.6330°W
- Built: 1918
- Architect: George D. Waller
- Architectural style: Colonial Revival
- NRHP reference No.: 10000923
- Added to NRHP: November 17, 2010

Stone Hall is a historic mansion in Nashville, Tennessee, US. It was designed by George D. Waller in the Colonial Revival architectural style. It has been listed on the National Register of Historic Places since November 17, 2010.

The Stone Hall was built in 1918 for the Cantrell family, Dempsey Weaver Cantrell (1880–1965) and Nora Johnson Cantrell (1882–1959). The couple married in 1907. Nora Johnson Cantrell was a poet, and was named Poet Laureate of the Tennessee Federation of Women's Clubs in 1939. Dempsey Weaver Cantrell was a businessman. He founded a wholesale paper goods company named Southern Woodenware Company in 1903. Before moving to Stone Hall, the Cantrell family lived in East Nashville in a house on Russell Street. Following the 1916 fire of East Nashville in which their street house was "just missed", they decided to shift their home to a suburban area of Nashville. Nora Cantrell's father owned some land in the Donelson area, and the Cantrell family decided to build their new home here. They met architect George Waller, who ended up designing Stone Hall.

The Metropolitan Government of Nashville and Davidson County and Greenways of Nashville acquired Stone Hall in 2006–07. Hall is now used for public events and can be hired for weddings, receptions and cultural programs.
