= Gassaway, Tennessee =

- Unincorporated community
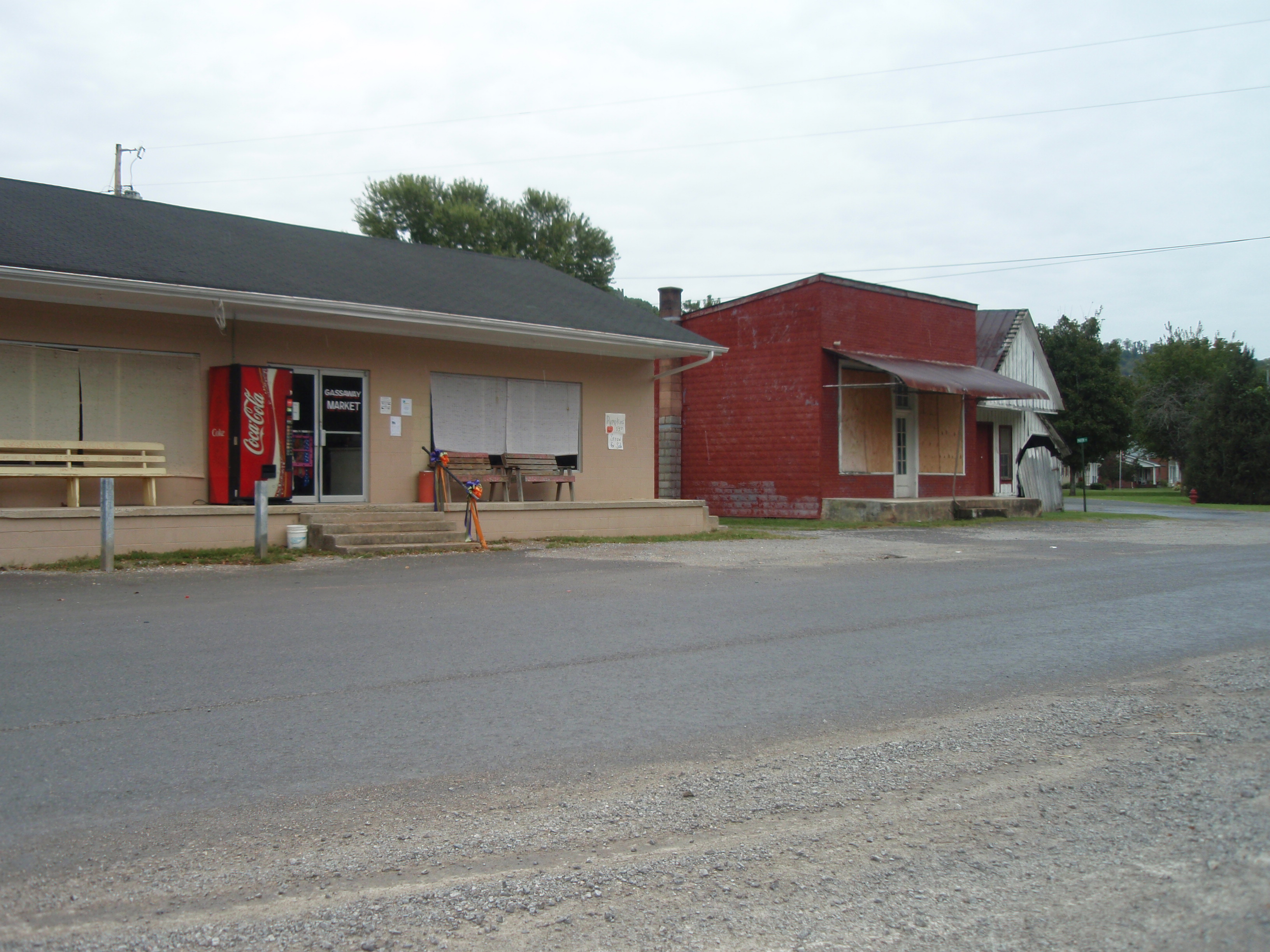
- Stores in Gassaway
- Interactive map of Gassaway, Tennessee
- Coordinates: 35.93979°N 85.99554°W
- Country: United States
- State: Tennessee
- County: Cannon
- Elevation: 660 ft (200 m)
- Time zone: UTC-6 (Central (CST))
  - Summer (DST): UTC-5 (CDT)
- Area code: 615
- GNIS feature ID: 1285226

Gassaway is an unincorporated community in Cannon County, Tennessee, United States.
