= Cannon County, Tennessee =

County in Tennessee, United States

- County
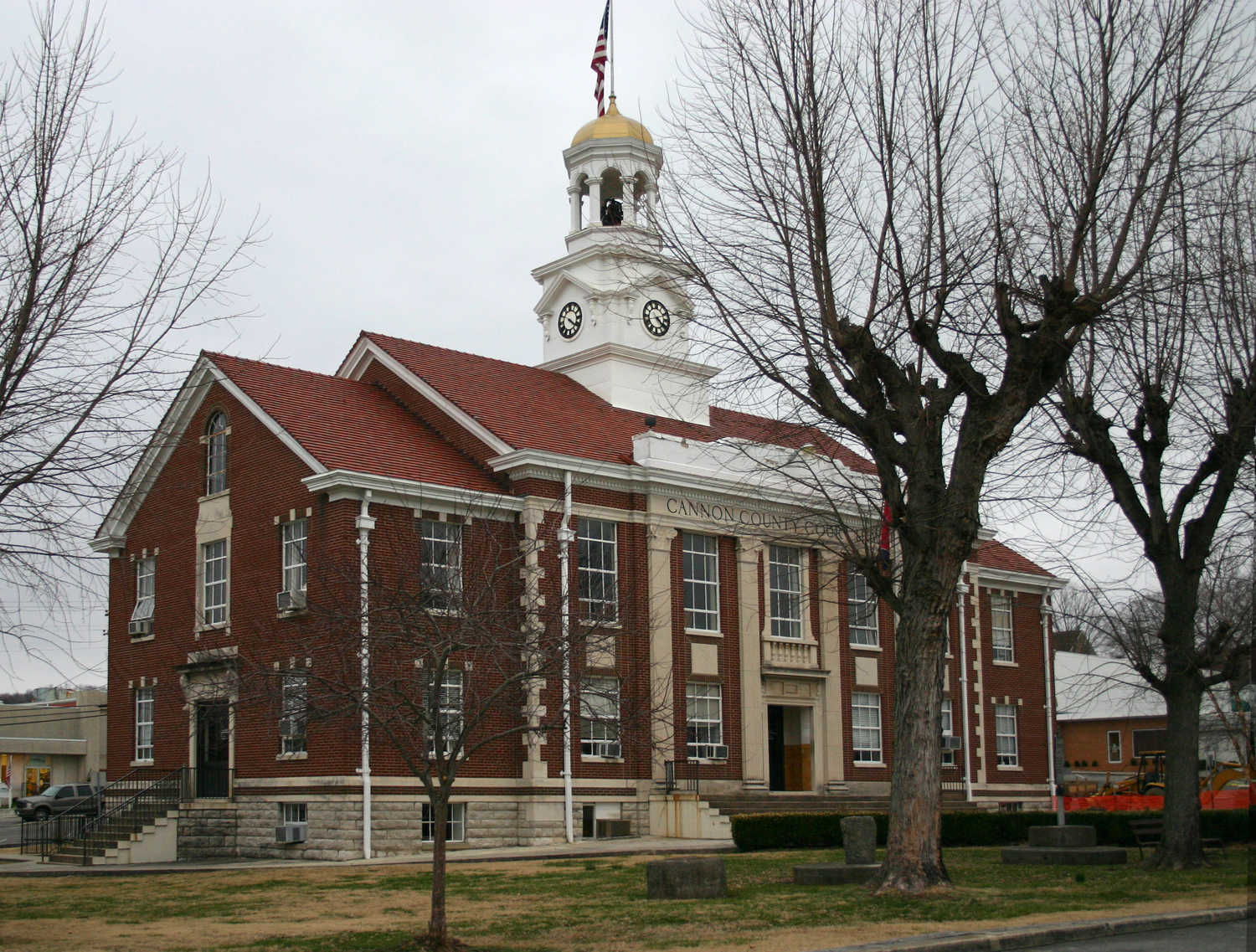
- Cannon County Courthouse in Woodbury

- Flag Seal

- Location within the U.S. state of Tennessee
- Coordinates: 35°49′N 86°04′W
- Country: United States
- State: Tennessee
- Founded: January 31, 1836
- Named for: Newton Cannon
- Seat: Woodbury
- Largest town: Woodbury

Area
  - Total: 266 sq mi (690 km^{2})
  - Land: 266 sq mi (690 km^{2})
  - Water: 0.06 sq mi (0.16 km^{2}) 0.02%

Population (2020)
  - Total: 14,506
  - Estimate (2025): 15,296 ▲
  - Density: 52/sq mi (20/km^{2})
- Time zone: UTC−6 (Central)
  - Summer (DST): UTC−5 (CDT)
- Congressional district: 6th
- Website: www.cannoncountytn.gov

Cannon County is a county located in the U.S. state of Tennessee. As of the 2020 census, the population was 14,506. Its county seat is Woodbury. Cannon County is part of the Nashville-Davidson–Murfreesboro–Franklin, TN Metropolitan Statistical Area.

== History ==
Cannon County was established by the Tennessee state legislature on January 31, 1836. It was formed from portions of Rutherford, Smith, Wilson, and Warren counties and was named for Governor Newton Cannon. This was part of the Middle Tennessee region, with mixed farming and livestock raising, including of thoroughbred horses.

== Geography ==
According to the U.S. Census Bureau, the county has a total area of 266 square miles (690 km^{2}), of which 266 square miles (690 km^{2}) is land and 0.06 square miles (0.16 km^{2}) (0.02%) is water.

=== Adjacent counties ===
- DeKalb County (northeast)
- Warren County (east)
- Coffee County (south)
- Rutherford County (west)
- Wilson County (northwest)

=== State protected areas ===
- Headwaters Wildlife Management Area
- Short Mountain State Natural Area

== Demographics ==
Historical population
Census	Pop.	Note	%±
1840	7,193		—
1850	8,982		24.9%
1860	9,509		5.9%
1870	10,502		10.4%
1880	11,859		12.9%
1890	12,197		2.9%
1900	12,121		−0.6%
1910	10,825		−10.7%
1920	10,241		−5.4%
1930	8,935		−12.8%
1940	9,880		10.6%
1950	9,174		−7.1%
1960	8,537		−6.9%
1970	8,467		−0.8%
1980	10,234		20.9%
1990	10,467		2.3%
2000	12,826		22.5%
2010	13,801		7.6%
2020	14,506		5.1%
2025 (est.)	15,296	▲	5.4%
U.S. Decennial Census; 1790–1960 1900–1990; 1990–2000 2010–2014

=== Racial and ethnic composition ===
Cannon County, Tennessee – Racial and ethnic composition Note: the US Census treats Hispanic/Latino as an ethnic category. This table excludes Latinos from the racial categories and assigns them to a separate category. Hispanics/Latinos may be of any race.
Race / Ethnicity (NH = Non-Hispanic)	Pop 1980	Pop 1990	Pop 2000	Pop 2010	Pop 2020	% 1980	% 1990	% 2000	% 2010	% 2020
White alone (NH)	9,963	10,215	12,331	13,190	13,064	97.35%	97.59%	96.14%	95.57%	90.06%
Black or African American alone (NH)	187	184	179	167	192	1.83%	1.76%	1.40%	1.21%	1.32%
Native American or Alaska Native alone (NH)	6	15	40	26	25	0.06%	0.14%	0.31%	0.19%	0.17%
Asian alone (NH)	9	14	13	19	38	0.09%	0.13%	0.10%	0.14%	0.26%
Native Hawaiian or Pacific Islander alone (NH)	x	x	3	9	4	x	x	0.02%	0.07%	0.03%
Other race alone (NH)	7	0	6	10	41	0.07%	0.00%	0.05%	0.07%	0.28%
Mixed race or Multiracial (NH)	x	x	97	170	747	x	x	0.76%	1.23%	5.15%
Hispanic or Latino (any race)	62	39	157	210	395	0.61%	0.37%	1.22%	1.52%	2.72%
Total	10,234	10,467	12,826	13,801	14,506	100.00%	100.00%	100.00%	100.00%	100.00%

=== 2020 census ===
As of the 2020 census, there were 14,506 people in the county. The median age was 43.1 years; 21.4% of residents were under the age of 18 and 19.1% were 65 years of age or older. For every 100 females there were 98.4 males, and for every 100 females age 18 and over there were 97.7 males.

The racial and ethnic composition is detailed in the table above.

There were 5,856 households in the county, of which 28.9% had children under the age of 18 living in them. Of all households, 49.9% were married-couple households, 19.0% were households with a male householder and no spouse or partner present, and 24.5% were households with a female householder and no spouse or partner present. About 27.3% of all households were made up of individuals and 13.4% had someone living alone who was 65 years of age or older.

There were 6,355 housing units, of which 7.9% were vacant. Among occupied housing units, 76.0% were owner-occupied and 24.0% were renter-occupied. The homeowner vacancy rate was 1.1% and the rental vacancy rate was 7.6%.

<0.1% of residents lived in urban areas, while 100.0% lived in rural areas.

=== 2000 census ===
As of the census of 2000, there were 12,826 people, 4,998 households, and 3,643 families residing in the county. The population density was 48 people per square mile (19 people/km^{2}). There were 5,420 housing units at an average density of 20 units per square mile (7.7/km^{2}). The racial makeup of the county was 96.87% White, 1.46% Black or African American, 0.33% Native American, 0.12% Asian, 0.02% Pacific Islander, 0.40% from other races, and 0.81% from two or more races. 1.22% of the population were Hispanic or Latino of any race.

There were 4,998 households, out of which 33.30% had children under the age of 18 living with them, 58.60% were married couples living together, 9.90% had a female householder with no husband present, and 27.10% were non-families. 24.30% of all households were made up of individuals, and 10.90% had someone living alone who was 65 years of age or older. The average household size was 2.53 and the average family size was 2.99.

In the county, the population was spread out, with 25.40% under the age of 18, 8.30% from 18 to 24, 28.90% from 25 to 44, 23.70% from 45 to 64, and 13.70% who were 65 years of age or older. The median age was 37 years. For every 100 females, there were 96.30 males. For every 100 females age 18 and over, there were 93.20 males.

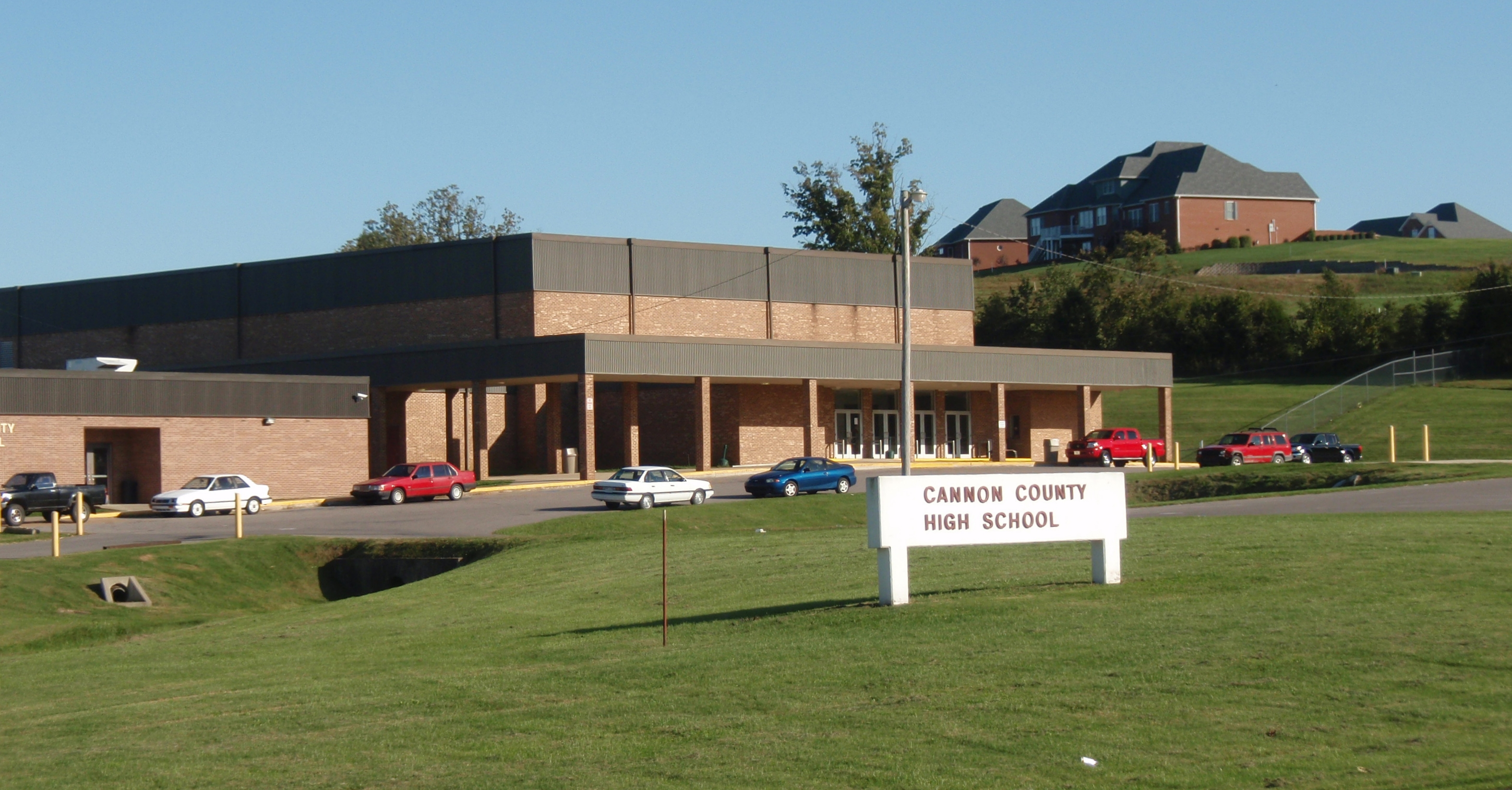
Cannon County High School in Woodbury

The median income for a household in the county was $32,809, and the median income for a family was $38,424. Males had a median income of $28,659 versus $21,489 for females. The per capita income for the county was $16,405. About 9.60% of families and 12.80% of the population were below the poverty line, including 14.00% of those under age 18 and 17.80% of those age 65 or over.

== Government ==
The policy-making and legislative authority in Cannon County is vested in the Board of County Commissioners. Commissioners are elected to four-year terms by a simple majority of the residents in their district. Each district has two commissioners, and all ten seats are up for election at the same time. Commissioners set personnel policies for the county, appropriate funds for county departments, and set the property tax rate. The county mayor typically serves as chair of the County Commission and breaks a tie if one occurs during voting. Members typically meet in January, April, July and October with special call meetings taking place when necessary.

County officials:

- County Executive: Greg Mitchell
- Sessions Court Judge: Matthew Cowan
- Circuit Court Clerk: Katina George
- County Clerk: Lana Jones
- Clerk & Master: Dana Davenport
- Register of Deeds: Sandy Hollandsworth
- Property Assessor: Angela Schwartz
- Trustee: Norma Knox
- Sheriff: Bill Sharp
- Constable 1st District: None
- Constable 2nd District: Charles Nokes
- Constable 3rd District: None
- Constable 4th District: None
- Constable 5th District: None

Each official is elected to a four-year term. The general sessions judge is elected to an eight-year term, and the clerk and master is appointed to a six-year term by the chancellor.

Board of County Commissioners
Each district is represented by two commissioners.

District 1 (Readyville and parts of Bradyville and Woodbury):

- Nathan Luna
- Nathan Sanders

District 2 (Auburntown, Gassaway and parts of Short Mountain):

- Karen Ashford
- Chris Singleton

District 3 (Woodland, Bradyville and parts of Woodbury):

- Curtis George
- Eddie Mears

District 4 (Eastside, part of Short Mountain, Sunny Slope, and parts of Woodbury):

- Robert B. Brandon
- Randy Gannon

District 5 (city limits of Woodbury):

- Kristal Alexander
- Tony Burnett

=== Election results ===
Cannon County is currently recognized as a Republican stronghold. The last Democrat to carry this county on a presidential level was Al Gore in 2000. Cannon was a typical "Solid South" county and continued being a Democratic stronghold until it voted for George W. Bush in his 2004 re-election campaign. Since then, the county is heavily Republican and has continued to vote more Republican in every election cycle.

United States presidential election results for Cannon County, Tennessee
Year	Republican		Democratic		Third party(ies)	
Year	No.	%	No.	%	No.	%
1912	631	33.74%	1,184	63.32%	55	2.94%
1916	456	32.76%	936	67.24%	0	0.00%
1920	687	47.15%	770	52.85%	0	0.00%
1924	285	32.46%	581	66.17%	12	1.37%
1928	588	48.60%	622	51.40%	0	0.00%
1932	360	22.86%	1,207	76.63%	8	0.51%
1936	498	29.82%	1,166	69.82%	6	0.36%
1940	638	27.06%	1,699	72.05%	21	0.89%
1944	627	38.47%	1,002	61.47%	1	0.06%
1948	558	26.23%	1,408	66.20%	161	7.57%
1952	930	37.97%	1,491	60.88%	28	1.14%
1956	919	37.13%	1,547	62.51%	9	0.36%
1960	1,195	48.05%	1,275	51.27%	17	0.68%
1964	746	25.41%	2,190	74.59%	0	0.00%
1968	780	25.55%	809	26.50%	1,464	47.95%
1972	1,615	62.38%	911	35.19%	63	2.43%
1976	908	26.71%	2,463	72.46%	28	0.82%
1980	1,403	36.76%	2,351	61.59%	63	1.65%
1984	1,669	46.88%	1,846	51.85%	45	1.26%
1988	1,604	47.91%	1,726	51.55%	18	0.54%
1992	1,229	28.38%	2,593	59.87%	509	11.75%
1996	1,468	35.08%	2,318	55.39%	399	9.53%
2000	1,924	40.96%	2,697	57.42%	76	1.62%
2004	2,931	53.48%	2,515	45.89%	35	0.64%
2008	3,322	60.88%	2,011	36.85%	124	2.27%
2012	3,309	66.54%	1,564	31.45%	100	2.01%
2016	4,007	75.40%	1,127	21.21%	180	3.39%
2020	5,190	79.15%	1,261	19.23%	106	1.62%
2024	5,682	82.58%	1,132	16.45%	67	0.97%

== Education ==
Beginning with the 2022–2023 school year, Auburn, East Side, and Short Mountain schools were closed. West Side, Woodbury Grammar, and Woodland schools were renamed Cannon North Elementary, Cannon County Elementary, and Cannon South Elementary, respectively, and house grades PreK–5. A new middle school, Cannon County Middle (grades 6–8), was housed temporarily with Cannon County Elementary.

The Cannon County School District operates five schools:

- Cannon County High School, Woodbury (9–12)
- Cannon County Middle School, Woodbury (6–8) – Opened in 2022
- Cannon North Elementary School (formerly West Side School, PreK–8), Readyville (PreK–5) – Renamed in 2022
- Cannon County Elementary School (formerly Woodbury Grammar School, PreK–8), Woodbury (PreK–5) – Renamed in 2022
- Cannon South Elementary School (formerly Woodland School, PreK–8), Bradyville (PreK–5) – Opened in 1955, renamed in 2022

Three elementary schools were closed during consolidation after the 2021–2022 school year:

- Auburn School, Auburntown (K–8) – Closed in 2022
- East Side Elementary School, Woodbury (K–8) – Closed in 2022
- Short Mountain Elementary School, Woodbury (K–8) – Opened in 1955, closed in 2022

=== Future ===
Long-term plans call for construction of a new Cannon County Middle School building, as well as the closure of Cannon North and Cannon South by 2025.

== Communities ==
=== Towns ===
- Auburntown
- Woodbury (county seat)

=== Unincorporated communities ===
- Bluewing
- Bradyville
- Gassaway
- Hopewell
- Iconium
- Midway
- Readyville
- Sugar Tree Knob

== See also ==
- National Register of Historic Places listings in Cannon County, Tennessee
