= Woodbury, Tennessee =

- Town
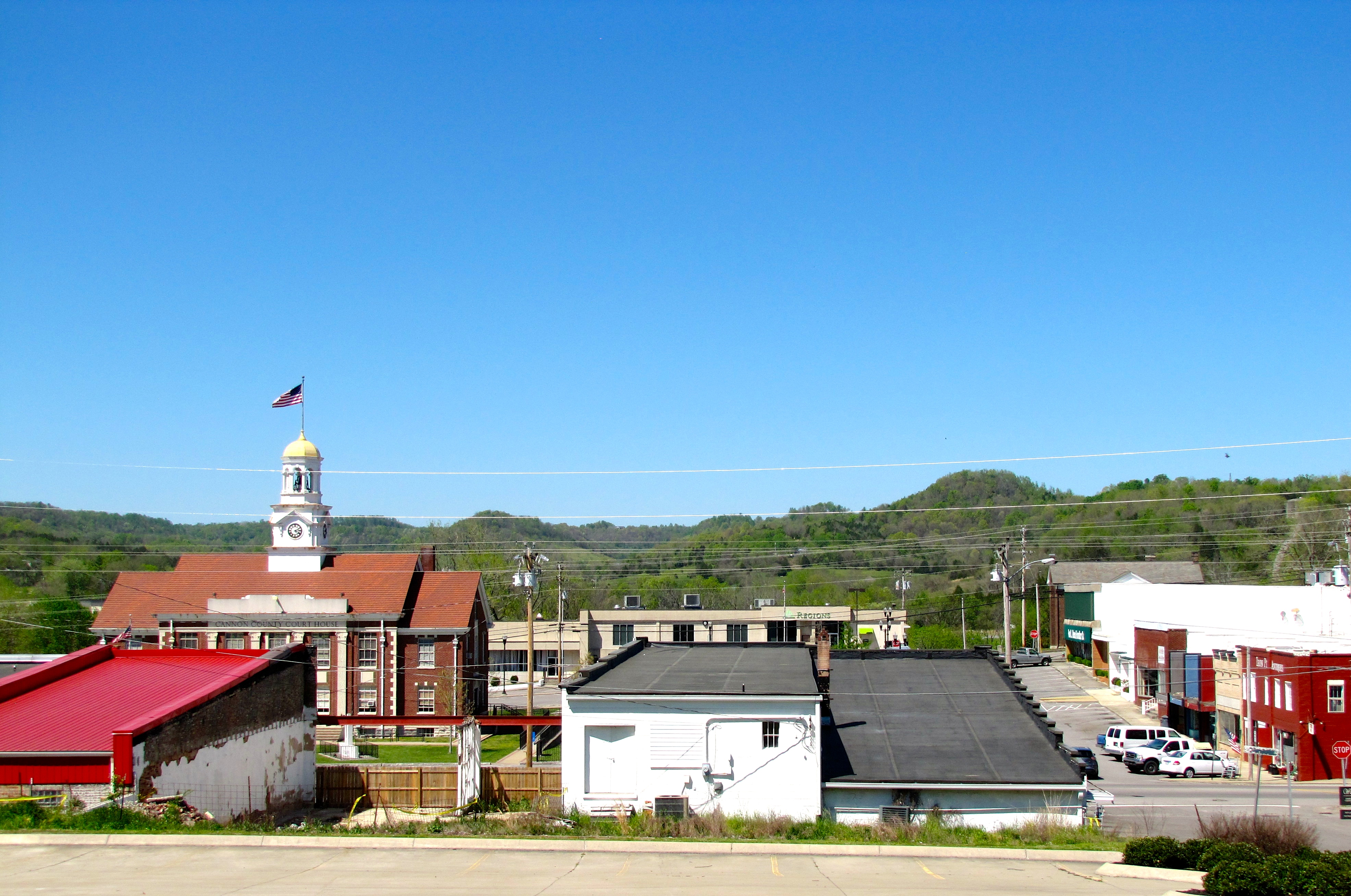
- Downtown Woodbury

- Location of Woodbury in Cannon County, Tennessee.
- Coordinates: 35°49′25″N 86°4′13″W
- Country: United States
- State: Tennessee
- County: Cannon
- Established: 1819
- Incorporated: 1838
- Named for: Levi Woodbury

Government
  - Mayor: RNS Demon

Area
  - Total: 1.98 sq mi (5.12 km^{2})
  - Land: 1.98 sq mi (5.12 km^{2})
  - Water: 0 sq mi (0.00 km^{2})
- Elevation: 720 ft (220 m)

Population (2020)
  - Total: 2,703
  - Density: 1,366.8/sq mi (527.72/km^{2})
- Time zone: UTC-6 (Central (CST))
  - Summer (DST): UTC-5 (CDT)
- ZIP code: 37190
- Area code: 615
- FIPS code: 47-81560
- GNIS feature ID: 1304664
- Website: cannoncountytn.org/woodbury-city-of/

Woodbury is a town in Cannon County, Tennessee, United States. Woodbury is part of the Nashville Metropolitan Statistical Area and is located 55 miles (89 km) southeast of downtown Nashville. As of the 2020 census, Woodbury had a population of 2,703. It is the county seat of Cannon County.

== Geography ==
Woodbury is a small town located near the center of Cannon County at 35°49′25″N 86°4′13″W (35.823644, -86.070268). It is in the valley of the East Fork of the Stones River, part of the Cumberland River watershed flowing through Nashville.

U.S. Route 70S passes through the town, leading west 19 miles (31 km) to Murfreesboro and southeast 20 miles (32 km) to McMinnville. Tennessee State Route 53 leads south from Woodbury 24 miles (39 km) to Manchester and north 16 miles (26 km) to Liberty. From the west side of Woodbury, Tennessee State Route 145 leads north 10 miles (16 km) to Auburntown.

According to the United States Census Bureau, the town of Woodbury has a total area of 2.0 square miles (5.2 km^{2}), all of it land.

=== Climate ===
The climate of Woodbury is a wet subtropical (Köppen Cfa) one with mild winters and hot summers. The diurnal temperature variation is unusual for such a rainy low-altitude climate, which leads to it having record highs and lows extreme for Tennessee; the temperature amplitude is 138 °F. Under the Trewartha climate classification, it is a temperate oceanic (Do) climate due to only 7 months having a mean 50 °F (10 °C) or higher.

Climate data for Woodbury 1 WNW, Tennessee (1991–2020 normals, extremes 1958–present)
Month	Jan	Feb	Mar	Apr	May	Jun	Jul	Aug	Sep	Oct	Nov	Dec	Year
Record high °F (°C)	81 (27)	84 (29)	89 (32)	98 (37)	99 (37)	110 (43)	110 (43)	109 (43)	103 (39)	104 (40)	92 (33)	84 (29)	110 (43)
Mean daily maximum °F (°C)	49.5 (9.7)	53.9 (12.2)	62.8 (17.1)	72.3 (22.4)	79.8 (26.6)	86.9 (30.5)	89.5 (31.9)	89.4 (31.9)	84.4 (29.1)	74.4 (23.6)	62.6 (17.0)	52.8 (11.6)	71.5 (21.9)
Daily mean °F (°C)	38.1 (3.4)	41.5 (5.3)	49.0 (9.4)	57.7 (14.3)	66.2 (19.0)	74.3 (23.5)	77.6 (25.3)	76.7 (24.8)	70.6 (21.4)	59.4 (15.2)	48.4 (9.1)	41.4 (5.2)	58.4 (14.7)
Mean daily minimum °F (°C)	26.7 (−2.9)	29.1 (−1.6)	35.3 (1.8)	43.2 (6.2)	52.6 (11.4)	61.8 (16.6)	65.7 (18.7)	64.0 (17.8)	56.9 (13.8)	44.4 (6.9)	34.3 (1.3)	29.9 (−1.2)	45.3 (7.4)
Record low °F (°C)	−28 (−33)	−14 (−26)	0 (−18)	18 (−8)	28 (−2)	35 (2)	47 (8)	44 (7)	26 (−3)	19 (−7)	7 (−14)	−15 (−26)	−28 (−33)
Average precipitation inches (mm)	5.03 (128)	4.98 (126)	5.38 (137)	4.92 (125)	4.82 (122)	5.18 (132)	6.26 (159)	3.78 (96)	4.11 (104)	3.33 (85)	3.92 (100)	5.86 (149)	57.57 (1,462)
Average precipitation days (≥ 0.01 in)	12.2	11.6	11.9	11.3	11.9	11.0	11.2	9.0	8.2	8.3	9.4	12.0	128.0
Source: NOAA

== Demographics ==
Historical population
Census	Pop.	Note	%±
1870	329		—
1880	393		19.5%
1890	576		46.6%
1900	468		−18.7%
1910	604		29.1%
1920	278		−54.0%
1930	502		80.6%
1940	663		32.1%
1950	1,000		50.8%
1960	1,562		56.2%
1970	1,725		10.4%
1980	2,160		25.2%
1990	2,287		5.9%
2000	2,428		6.2%
2010	2,680		10.4%
2020	2,703		0.9%

=== 2020 census ===
Woodbury racial composition
Race	Number	Percentage
White (non-Hispanic)	2,382	88.12%
Black or African American (non-Hispanic)	88	3.26%
Native American	5	0.18%
Asian	20	0.74%
Other/Mixed	100	3.7%
Hispanic or Latino	108	4.0%

As of the 2020 United States census, there were 2,703 people, 1,139 households, and 609 families residing in the town.

=== 2010 census ===
As of the census of 2010, there were 2,680 people, 1,052 households, and 608 families residing in the town. The population density was 1,552.0 people per square mile (599.2 people/km^{2}). There were 1,159 housing units at an average density of 671.1 per square mile (259.1/km^{2}). The racial makeup of the town was 94.36% White, 3.83% African American, 0.54% Native American, 0.04% Asian, 0.04% Pacific Islander, 0.41% from other races, and 0.78% from two or more races. Hispanic or Latino of any race were 2.35% of the population.

There were 1,052 households, out of which 27.3% had children under the age of 18 living with them, 37.1% were married couples living together, 16.6% had a female householder with no husband present, and 42.2% were non-families. 39.5% of all households were made up of individuals, and 19.7% had someone living alone who was 65 years of age or older. The average household size was 2.16 and the average family size was 2.88.

In the town, the population was spread out, with 23.1% under the age of 18, 10.2% from 18 to 24, 23.4% from 25 to 44, 21.7% from 45 to 64, and 21.6% who were 65 years of age or older. The median age was 40 years. For every 100 females, there were 80.0 males. For every 100 females age 18 and over, there were 71.8 males.

The median income for a household in the town was $23,846, and the median income for a family was $33,889. Males had a median income of $28,636 versus $19,231 for females. The per capita income for the town was $17,557. About 17.9% of families and 23.1% of the population were below the poverty line, including 34.2% of those under age 18 and 24.5% of those age 65 or over.

== Festivals & Fairs ==
There are a few festivals in Woodbury. The most notable taking place each spring, is known as "The Good Ole Days". The Cannon County Fair also happens in May each year at the Cannon County Fairgrounds. Other festivals include the Cannon County Christmas Business Open House and a weekly "Cruise-In" on the square.
