= National Register of Historic Places listings in Grundy County, Tennessee =

Location of Grundy County in Tennessee

This is a list of the National Register of Historic Places listings in Grundy County, Tennessee.

This is intended to be a complete list of the properties and districts on the National Register of Historic Places in Grundy County, Tennessee, United States. Latitude and longitude coordinates are provided for many National Register properties and districts; these locations may be seen together in a map.

There are 22 properties and districts listed on the National Register in the county. Another 5 properties in the county were once listed, but have since been removed.

See also National Register of Historic Places listings in Marion County, Tennessee for additional properties in Monteagle, a city that spans the county line.

Contents: Counties in Tennessee
Anderson – Bedford – Benton – Bledsoe – Blount – Bradley – Campbell – Cannon – Carroll – Carter – Cheatham – Chester – Claiborne – Clay – Cocke – Coffee – Crockett – Cumberland – Davidson – Decatur – DeKalb – Dickson – Dyer – Fayette – Fentress – Franklin – Gibson – Giles – Grainger – Greene – Grundy – Hamblen – Hamilton – Hancock – Hardeman – Hardin – Hawkins – Haywood – Henderson – Henry – Hickman – Houston – Humphreys – Jackson – Jefferson – Johnson – Knox – Lake – Lauderdale – Lawrence – Lewis – Lincoln – Loudon – Macon – Madison – Marion – Marshall – Maury – McMinn – McNairy – Meigs – Monroe – Montgomery – Moore – Morgan – Obion – Overton – Perry – Pickett – Polk – Putnam – Rhea – Roane – Robertson – Rutherford – Scott – Sequatchie – Sevier – Shelby – Smith – Stewart – Sullivan – Sumner – Tipton – Trousdale – Unicoi – Union – Van Buren – Warren – Washington – Wayne – Weakley – White – Williamson – Wilson

This National Park Service list is complete through NPS recent listings posted May 29, 2026.

== Current listings ==
	Name on the Register	Image	Date listed	Location	City or town	Description
1	Beersheba Springs Historic District	Beersheba Springs Historic District	March 20, 1980 (#80003801)	State Route 56; 35°28′00″N 85°39′23″W	Beersheba Springs	Includes the Beersheba Springs Hotel complex and more than two dozen other buildings associated with late-19th and early-20th century Beersheba Springs resort
2	Christ Episcopal Church		April 24, 2015 (#15000186)	530 10th St. 35°15′28″N 85°44′09″W	Tracy City	
3	Coalmont Bank Building	Coalmont Bank Building	March 14, 1991 (#91000246)	Junction of State Route 56 and Heidenburg St. 35°20′21″N 85°42′12″W	Coalmont	
4	DuBose Memorial Church Training School	DuBose Memorial Church Training School	November 25, 1980 (#80003802)	Fairmont and College Sts. 35°14′29″N 85°49′38″W	Monteagle	
5	Firescald Creek Stone Arch Bridge	Firescald Creek Stone Arch Bridge	April 1, 1987 (#87000522)	Northcutts Cove Rd. over Firescald Creek; 35°26′45″N 85°43′46″W	Altamont	
6	Grundy Lakes Historic District		April 1, 1987 (#87000538)	Grundy Lakes State Park east of State Route 56; 35°16′11″N 85°43′00″W	Tracy City	
7	E.L. Hampton House	E.L. Hampton House	April 1, 1987 (#87000528)	Depot and Oak St. 35°15′30″N 85°44′27″W	Tracy City	
8	Hickory Creek Stone Arch Bridge	Hickory Creek Stone Arch Bridge	April 1, 1987 (#87000526)	Sherwood Rd. over Hickory Creek; 35°28′35″N 85°50′47″W	Marvin Chapel	
9	Highlander Folk School Library Building	Highlander Folk School Library Building	October 5, 2022 (#100007964)	120 Old Highlander Ln. 35°15′18″N 85°48′33″W	Monteagle	
10	Marugg Company	Marugg Company	April 1, 1987 (#87000527)	35 Depot St. 35°15′40″N 85°44′18″W	Tracy City	
11	Monteagle Sunday School Assembly Historic District	Monteagle Sunday School Assembly Historic District	March 25, 1982 (#82003974)	Off U.S. Route 41, U.S. Route 64, and State Route 56; 35°14′38″N 85°50′14″W	Monteagle	
12	H.B. Northcutt House	H.B. Northcutt House	March 23, 1982 (#82003973)	State Route 56; 35°25′45″N 85°43′26″W	Altamont	
13	Northcutts Cove Chapel	Northcutts Cove Chapel	April 18, 1979 (#79002433)	Southeast of Altamont; 35°30′48″N 85°45′00″W	Altamont	
14	Col. A.M. Shook House	Col. A.M. Shook House	April 1, 1987 (#87000529)	Junction of Depot and Montgomery Sts. 35°15′31″N 85°44′26″W	Tracy City	
15	Stagecoach Inn	Stagecoach Inn	April 2, 1987 (#87000524)	Colony Rd. 35°23′58″N 85°40′02″W	Gruetli	
16	Stagecoach Road		April 1, 1987 (#87000521)	Savage Gulf State Natural Area northwest of State Route 108; 35°26′48″N 85°36′16″W	Beersheba Springs	
17	Stoker-Stampfli Farm	Stoker-Stampfli Farm	April 2, 1987 (#87000525)	Colony Cemetery Rd. 35°23′32″N 85°38′44″W	Gruetli	
18	Tracy City Coke Ovens		April 1, 1987 (#87000533)	West of Hobbs Hill Rd. 35°16′34″N 85°44′03″W	Tracy City	
19	Frank White House	Frank White House	April 1, 1987 (#87000530)	10th St. 35°15′20″N 85°44′11″W	Tracy City	
20	Wonder Cave Historic District		April 1, 1987 (#87000520)	Wonder Cave Rd. 35°16′24″N 85°50′55″W	Monteagle	
21	L.V. Woodlee House	L.V. Woodlee House	April 2, 1987 (#87000523)	Cumberland St. 35°25′50″N 85°43′21″W	Altamont	
22	Wrenn's Nest	Wrenn's Nest	March 13, 1986 (#86000399)	Eagle Cliff Rd. 35°14′57″N 85°50′53″W	Monteagle	

== Former listings ==
	Name on the Register	Image	Date listed	Date removed	Location	City or town	Description
1	Elkhead Stone Arch Bridge		April 19, 1978 (#78002593)	August 1, 1986	N of Pelham	Pelham vicinity	
2	Grundy County Jail		June 18, 1978 (#75001756)	January 19, 1983	Off TN 56	Altamont	Three-story red brick building that was a local landmark; demolished in 1982.
3	Miner's Hall		April 1, 1987 (#87000535)	May 23, 1988	Jasper Rd.	Tracy City	
4	John E. Patton House		April 1, 1987 (#87000540)	November 27, 2019	Roddy Creek Rd. 35°19′56″N 85°42′23″W	Coalmont	
5	Scott Creek Stone Arch Bridge	Scott Creek Stone Arch Bridge	April 1, 1987 (#87000539)	October 27, 2022	Over Scott Creek at Flat Branch Rd. 35°18′17″N 85°42′45″W	Coalmont	

== See also ==
- List of National Historic Landmarks in Tennessee
- National Register of Historic Places listings in Tennessee
