= Tennessee State Route 399 =

Highway in Tennessee

State Route 399
- Barkertown Road; Rifle Range Road
- TN 399 highlighted in red

Route information
- Maintained by TDOT
- Length: 10.6 mi (17.1 km)

Major junctions
- West end: SR 108 on the Gruetli-Laager–Palmer city line
- East end: SR 8 / SR 111 in Cagle

Location
- Country: United States
- State: Tennessee
- Counties: Grundy, Sequatchie

Highway system
- Tennessee State Routes; Interstate; US; State
← SR 397	→ SR 400

State Route 399 (SR 399) is 10.6-mile-long (17.1 km) east–west state highway in the Cumberland Plateau region of Tennessee. It serves to connect the towns of Gruetli-Laager and Palmer to Cagle and Savage Gulf State Park.

SR 399 is known as Barkertown Road in Grundy County and Rifle Range Road in Sequatchie County.

== Route description ==
SR 399 begins in Grundy County on the Gruetli-Laager–Palmer city line at an intersection with SR 108. It heads northeasterly through farmland and rural areas to cross a bridge over the Collins River before passing by the eastern entrance of Savage Gulf State Park. The highway then curves to the east and crosses into Sequatchie County. SR 399 then goes through remote wooded areas for the next several miles before entering farmland and the community of Cagle to come to an end at an intersection with SR 8/SR 111. The entire route of SR 399 is a two-lane rural highway and lies entirely atop the Cumberland Plateau.

== Major intersections ==
County	Location	mi	km	Destinations	Notes
Grundy	Gruetli-Laager–Palmer line	0.0	0.0	SR 108 – Gruetli-Laager, Palmer	Western terminus
Grundy		1.5	2.4	Bridge over the Collins River	
Grundy	Savage Gulf State Park	5.1	8.2	Savage Gulf State Park eastern entrance	Access road into park
Sequatchie	Cagle	10.6	17.1	SR 8 / SR 111 – Spencer, McMinnville, Dunlap	Eastern terminus
1.000 mi = 1.609 km; 1.000 km = 0.621 mi
