= Grundy County High School =

Public school in Tennessee, United States

Location
- 24970 State Route 108, Coalmont, Tennessee, United States; 35.3747°N 85.7151°W

Information
- Type: Public
- Established: 1928
- School district: Grundy County Schools
- Principal: Charlie Westmoreland
- Grades: 9-12
- Enrollment: 486 (2024-2025)
- Colors: Purple and Vegas gold
- Athletics conference: Tennessee Secondary School Athletic Association (TSSAA)
- Mascot: Yellow jacket
- Team name: Yellow Jackets
- Website: hs.grundycoschools.com

Grundy County High School (GCHS) is a public high school near Coalmont, Tennessee that serves students in Grundy County, Tennessee. It is the only high school in the Grundy County Schools system.

== History ==
Grundy County High School was founded in 1928, replacing Shook School, which was a grammar school expanded to high school classes. The school was located in Tracy City. The school continued to serve generation after generation until 1997. Before Christmas of that year, Grundy County High School was relocated to a new facility where it continues to serve Grundy County students.

== Demographics ==
The ethnic makeup of the school is approximately 99.0% Non-Hispanic White, 0.7% Hispanic or Latino, 0.1% Asian, and 0.1% from two or more races. Approximately 52.5% of students are male and 47.5% are female.

== Athletics ==
The school's mascot is the yellow jacket, and its colors are purple and vegas gold. It competes in the Tennessee Secondary School Athletic Association (TSSAA). Its sports are:

- Football
- Baseball
- Softball
- Boys' Basketball
- Girls' Basketball - state championship (1998)
- Boys' Cross Country
- Girls' Cross Country
- Boys' Golf
- Girls' Golf
- Cheerleading
- Volleyball
