= Tennessee State Route 108 =

State highway in Tennessee, United States

State Route 108
- SR 108; primary in red, secondary in blue

Route information
- Maintained by TDOT
- Length: 61.7 mi (99.3 km)

Major junctions
- South end: SR 28 in Whitwell
- SR 56 in Coalmont
- North end: SR 55 Bus. / SR 56 / SR 380 in McMinnville

Location
- Country: United States
- State: Tennessee
- Counties: Marion, Grundy, Warren

Highway system
- Tennessee State Routes; Interstate; US; State
← SR 107	→ SR 109

State Route 108 (SR 108) is a 61.7-mile-long (99.3 km) state highway in Southeastern and Eastern Middle Tennessee. It connects SR 28 in Whitwell to SR 55 Bus/SR 56/SR 380 in McMinnville.

== Route description ==
=== Marion County ===
SR 108 begins as a primary highway in Marion County at an intersection with SR 28 in Whitwell. It travels to the north as Main Street into downtown and then turns northeast as Cumberland Drive and leaves Whitwell. It then ascends to the top of the Cumberland Plateau and passes through primarily rural terrain, where it passes through Griffith Creek, until it reaches Grundy County.

=== Grundy County ===
SR 108 continues north through rural terrain until it enters the town of Palmer and passes through its downtown area. It then comes to an intersection with SR 399, where it enters Gruetli-Laager.

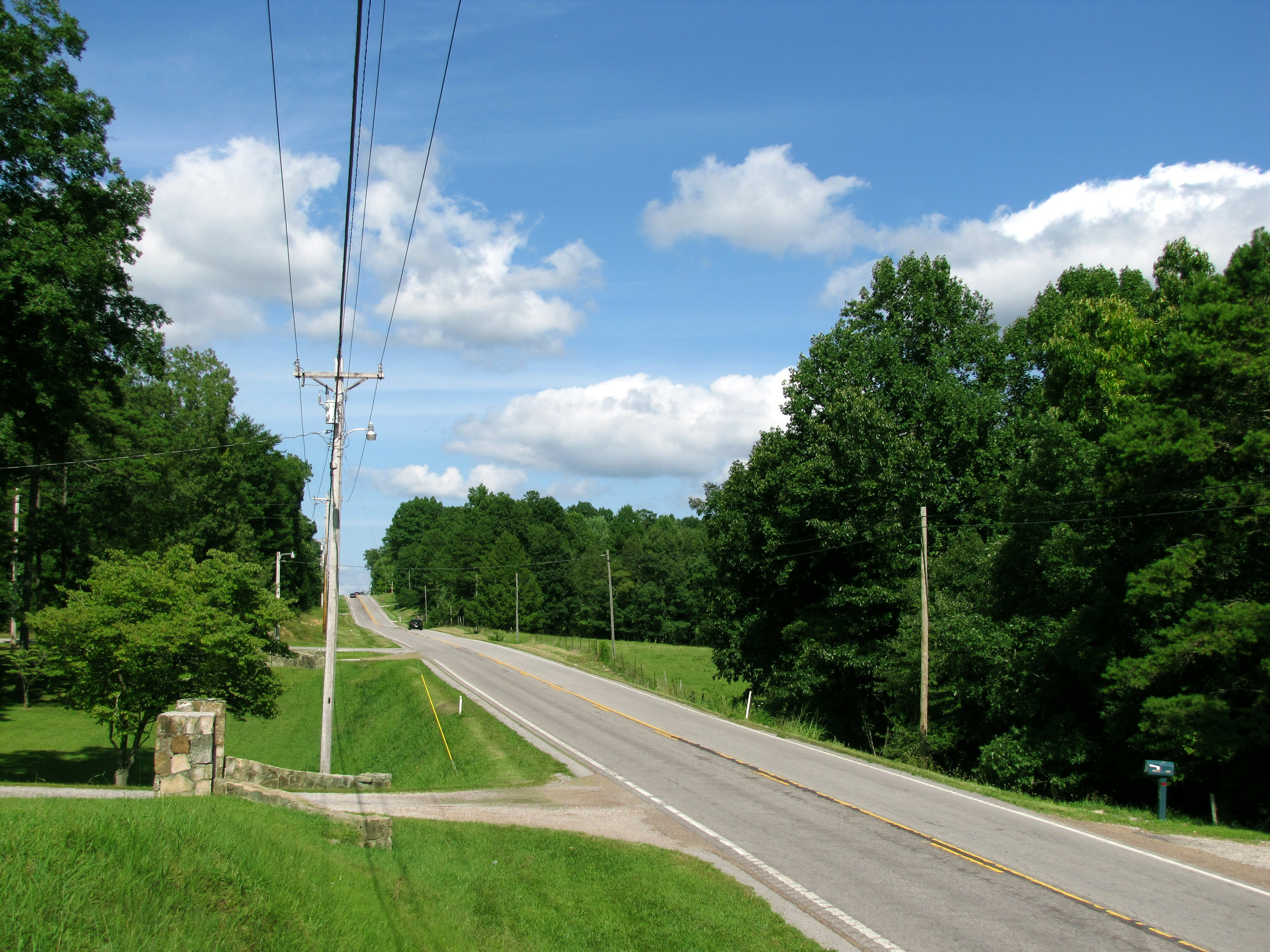
SR 108 in Gruetli-Laager

SR 108 passes through the city for approximately six miles (9.7 km), Before entering Coalmont, where it has an intersection with SR 56 for the first time. Approximately one mile (1.6 km) past the SR 56 intersection, it leaves Coalmont and enters rural terrain again, where it comes to an intersection and becomes concurrent with SR 50 and turns back north on SR 50 east. After approximately three miles (4.8 km) of mostly wooded terrain, the highway enters Altamont, where they continue into downtown and come to a second intersection with SR 56, where SR 50 ends and SR 108 becomes concurrent with SR 56 for a mere 184 feet (56 m), where it becomes a secondary highway, before splitting from SR 56 and turning west, leaving Altamont. Just after leaving Altamont, it turns back north and continues on a northerly track through a mix of hills and farmland until it crosses into Warren County.

=== Warren County ===
SR 108 then passes through farmland until it enters Viola, where it intersects and becomes concurrent with SR 127. SR 108 and SR 127 stay merged for eight miles (13 km), where they pass through downtown before leaving Viola and having an intersection with SR 287, to a y-intersection where SR 108 turns north and SR 127 continues northeast. SR 108 then enters McMinnville city and continues north until it intersects SR 55 Bus. It then travels concurrently with SR 55 Bus. and goes northeast through a couple of neighborhoods before crossing the Barren Fork River and enter downtown, where SR 108 meets its northern terminus at SR 56 and SR 380.

== Major intersections ==
County	Location	mi	km	Destinations	Notes
Marion	Whitwell	0.0	0.0	SR 28 – Dunlap, Jasper	Southern terminus; begins as a primary highway
Grundy	Gruetli-Laager–Palmer town line			SR 399 east (Barkertown Road) – Cagle	Western terminus of SR 399; provides access to Savage Gulf State Natural Area (South Cumberland State Park)
Grundy	Gruetli-Laager			55th Avenue - Collins West Trailhead (South Cumberland State Park)	
Grundy	Coalmont			SR 56 – Tracy City, Altamont	
Grundy				SR 50 west (Pelham Road) – Pelham	Western end of SR 50 concurrency
Grundy	Altamont			SR 56 south (Main Street) – Coalmont	Eastern terminus of SR 50; Southern end of SR 56 concurrency; SR 108 turns secondary
Grundy	Altamont			SR 56 north (Main Street) – Beersheba Springs, McMinnville	Northern end of SR 56 concurrency
Warren	Viola			SR 127 south (Hillboro-Viola Road) – Hillsboro	Southern end of SR 127 concurrency
Warren				SR 287 north – Morrison	Southern terminus of SR 287
Warren				SR 127 north (Shellsford Road)	Northern end of SR 127 concurrency
Warren	McMinnville			SR 55 Bus. south (South Chancery Street) – Tullahoma	Southern of SR 55 Business concurrency
Warren	McMinnville	61.7	99.3	SR 56 (East Colville Street / South Chancery Street) to SR 380 – Altamont, Smithville	Northern terminus of SR 55 Business and SR 108
1.000 mi = 1.609 km; 1.000 km = 0.621 mi: Concurrency terminus
