= Griffith Creek, Tennessee =

Unincorporated community in Tennessee, US

Coordinates: 35°17′02″N 85°33′00″W

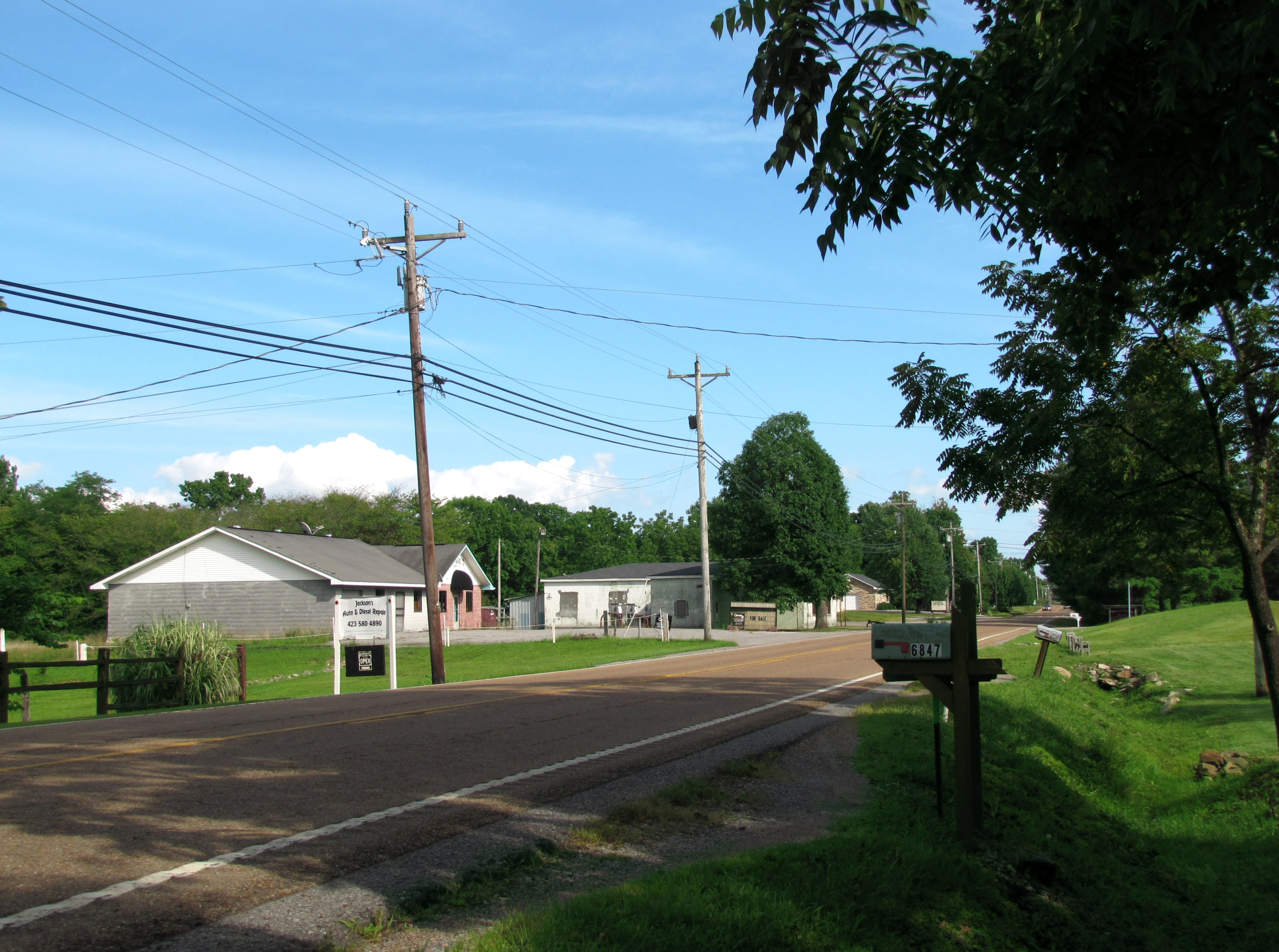
TN-108 in Griffith Creek

Griffith Creek is an unincorporated community in Marion County, Tennessee, United States. It lies along the edge of the Cumberland Plateau, about midway between Palmer and Whitwell. The elevation is 2,234 feet (681 m) above sea level. Tennessee State Route 108 traverses the community. The ZIP Code for Griffith Creek is 37397.
