= Colonel A. M. Shook House =

Historic house in Tennessee, United States

- U.S. National Register of Historic Places
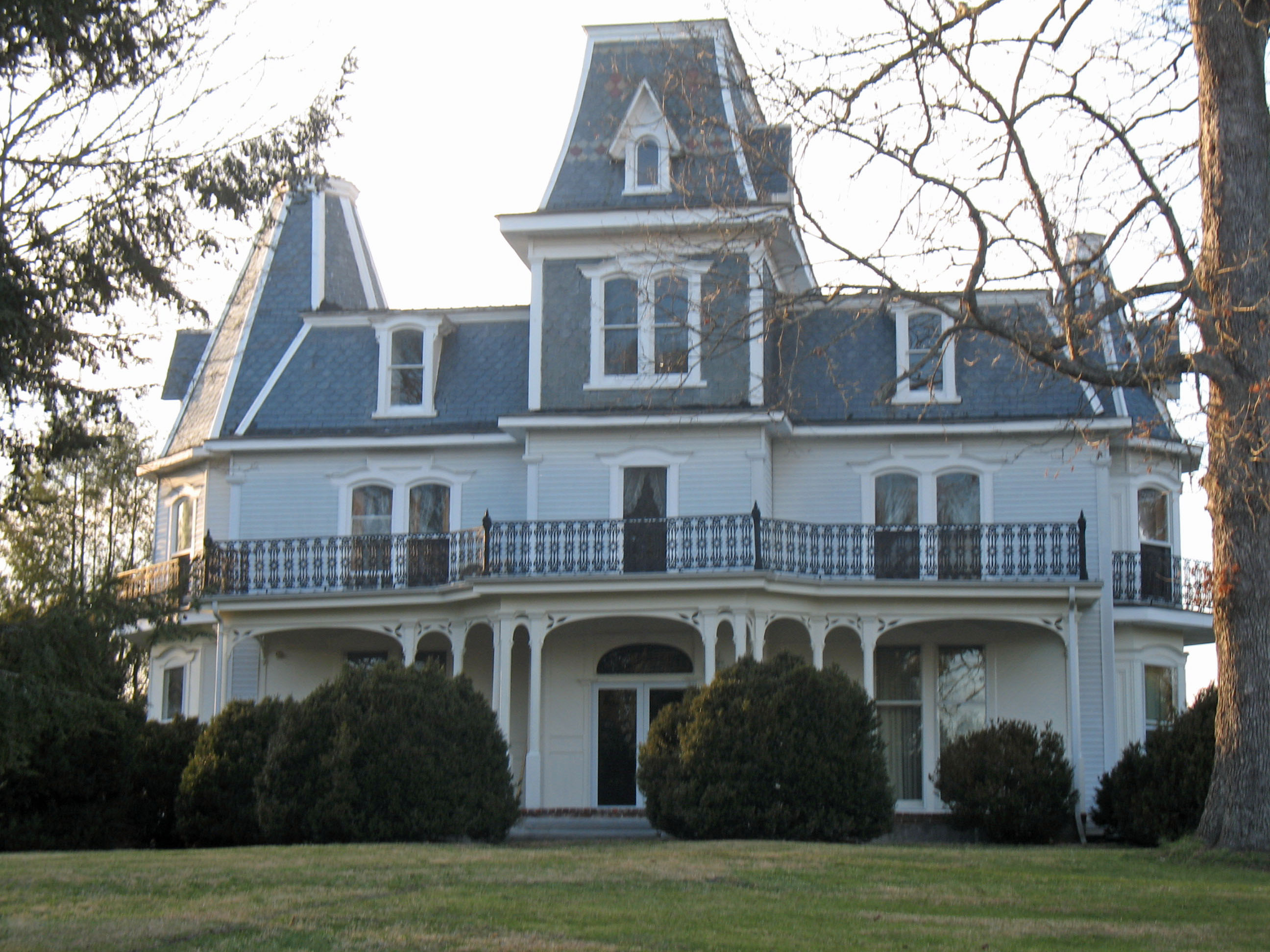
- The house in March 2009

- Location within Tennessee Location within the United States
- Location: Junction of Railroad Avenue and Montgomery Streets, Tracy City, Tennessee
- Coordinates: 35°15′31″N 85°44′26″W
- Area: 1.7 acres (0.69 ha)
- Built: 1890
- Architectural style: Second Empire, Vernacular Second Empire
- MPS: Grundy County MRA
- NRHP reference No.: 87000529
- Added to NRHP: April 1, 1987

The Colonel A. M. Shook House (also known as Boyd House) is a historic residence in Tracy City, Tennessee, United States. It was listed on the National Register of Historic Places on April 1, 1987.

== History ==
The house, located at the junction of Railroad Avenue and Montgomery Streets, was built in 1890 for Colonel Alfred Montgomery Shook, prominent in the coal industry in Grundy County. The 2 1/2-story frame house was designed in the Second Empire architectural style.

== See also ==
- National Register of Historic Places listings in Grundy County, Tennessee
