= List of National Natural Landmarks in Tennessee =

There are 13 National Natural Landmarks in Tennessee.

Tennessee National Natural Landmarks (clickable map)

Name	Image	Date	Location	County	Ownership	Description
Arnold Engineering Development Center Natural Areas		1974		Coffee	federal (Arnold Air Force Base)	Contains an extremely rare virgin swamp forest and a pristine example of an open marsh.
Big Bone Cave		1973	35.7726°N 85.557°W	Van Buren	state	Cave where giant ground sloth bones were discovered.
Cedar Glades		1973	36.07366°N 86.31151°W	Wilson	state (Cedars of Lebanon State Park)	The largest and best remaining example of the cedar glade community.
Conley Hole		1973		Grundy	private	One of the most spectacular and outstanding examples of a pit cave in the United States.
Cumberland Caverns		1973	35.669167°N 85.680833°W	Warren	private	Two interconnecting caves at least 27 miles (43 km) in extent.
Dick Cove		1973	35.227839°N 85.955392°W	Franklin	private	A near virgin forest
Grassy Cove Karst Area		1973	35.856787°N 84.926373°W	Cumberland	private	One of the nation's best illustrations of karst development and underground drainage
The Lost Sea		1974	35.535556°N 84.431111°W	Monroe	private	Cavern system that includes the largest known underground lake in the country.
May Prairie		1974	35.450232°N 86.022274°W	Coffee	state	Largest and best relict prairie remaining in Tennessee.
McAnulty's Woods		1973		Hardeman	private	Only known example in western Tennessee of the upland forests of the Mississippi Embayment
Piney Falls		1974		Rhea	state (Piney Falls State Natural Area)	Contains a rare virgin mixed mesophytic forest stand.
Reelfoot Lake	Reelfoot Lake	1966	36.388889°N 89.388889°W	Lake, Obion	federal (Reelfoot National Wildlife Refuge)	Mosaic of habitats formed as a result of the New Madrid earthquake,
Savage Gulf		1971	35.259°N 85.789°W	Grundy	state (Savage Gulf State Natural Area)	A virgin forest.

== See also ==
- List of National Historic Landmarks in Tennessee
