= Northcutt (surname) =

Origin
- Origin: Anglo-Saxon
- Region of origin: England

Other names
- Variant form: numerous

Northcutt is a surname originating as a toponymic surname in England. It may be traced as far back to Devon in the year 1103 at Northcote manor, and may be translated in Old English as norð ‘north’ + cot ‘cottage’, ‘shelter’.

== Northcote Manor ==
A new manor was built beside the ruins of the original Northcote manor, which still exists today in North Devonshire, and the first officially recorded resident of the "north cottage" in Devonshire was one Nicholas de Northicote in the year 1199.

== Spelling variations ==
There are a wide variety of spelling variations on the 'Northcutt' surname that have evolved over time and geography. These include:

- Northcote
- Northicote
- Norcott
- Norcot
- Norcutt
- Norcut
- Northcott
- Northcot
- Northcut
- Norkutt
- Norkett
- Narracott
- Northcult
- North Cult
- Northcutt

== Noteworthy people ==
- Adrian Northcut (1799–1869): A U.S. military General that fought in the War with Mexico, later chose the site where Altamont, Tennessee was built
- Frances ‘Poppy’ Northcutt (born 1943): U.S. mathematician and women's rights activist; responsible for calculating the return-to-Earth trajectory of Apollo 8 and the rescue trajectory of Apollo 13
- Sage Northcutt, a professional martial artist from Texas.
