= Northcutt =

Northcutt may refer to:

- Northcutt (surname)
- Dennis Northcutt (born 1977), American football wide receiver and punt returner
- Frances 'Poppy' Northcutt (born 1943), American 'computress' for NASA's Apollo Project and attorney specializing in women's rights
- Glenn Northcutt, leader in comparative vertebrate neurobiology and evolutionary neuroscience
- Kevin Northcutt (born 1973), American professional wrestler
- Sage Northcutt (born 1996), American mixed martial artist
- Wendy Northcutt (born 1963), the creator of the Darwinawards.com website and author of five books on the Darwin Awards

== See also ==
- Northcut, Missouri, a community in the United States
- Northcutt-Carter Route (Hallett Peak), popular technical climbing route on Hallett Peak in Colorado's Rocky Mountain National Park
