= Northcutts Cove Chapel =

- U.S. National Register of Historic Places
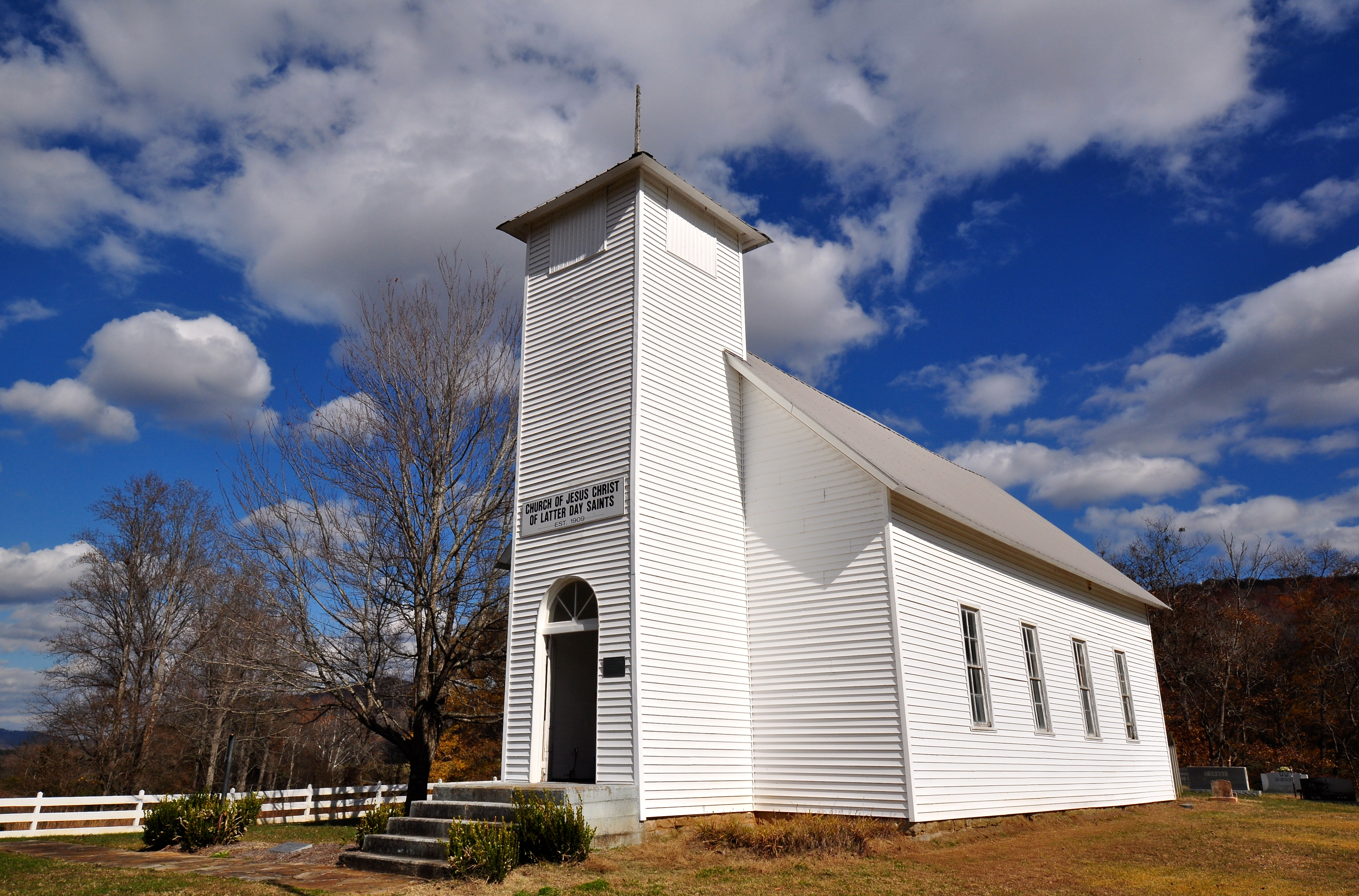
- Northcutts Cove Chapel, November 2014.

- Location within Tennessee Location within the United States
- Nearest city: Altamont, Tennessee
- Coordinates: 35°30′48″N 85°45′0″W
- Area: 0.4 acres (0.16 ha)
- Built: 1909
- MPS: Grundy County MRA (AD)
- NRHP reference No.: 79002433
- Added to NRHP: April 18, 1979

The Northcutts Cove Chapel in Altamont, Grundy County, Tennessee, is one of the oldest chapels of the Church of Jesus Christ of Latter-day Saints in the southeastern United States.

The chapel was dedicated in 1909 by Charles A. Callis who was then, president of the Southern States Mission of the LDS.

The building is a wooden-frame structure with a bell tower and spire. It was listed on the National Register of Historic Places in 1979.
