= Palmer, Tennessee =

- Town
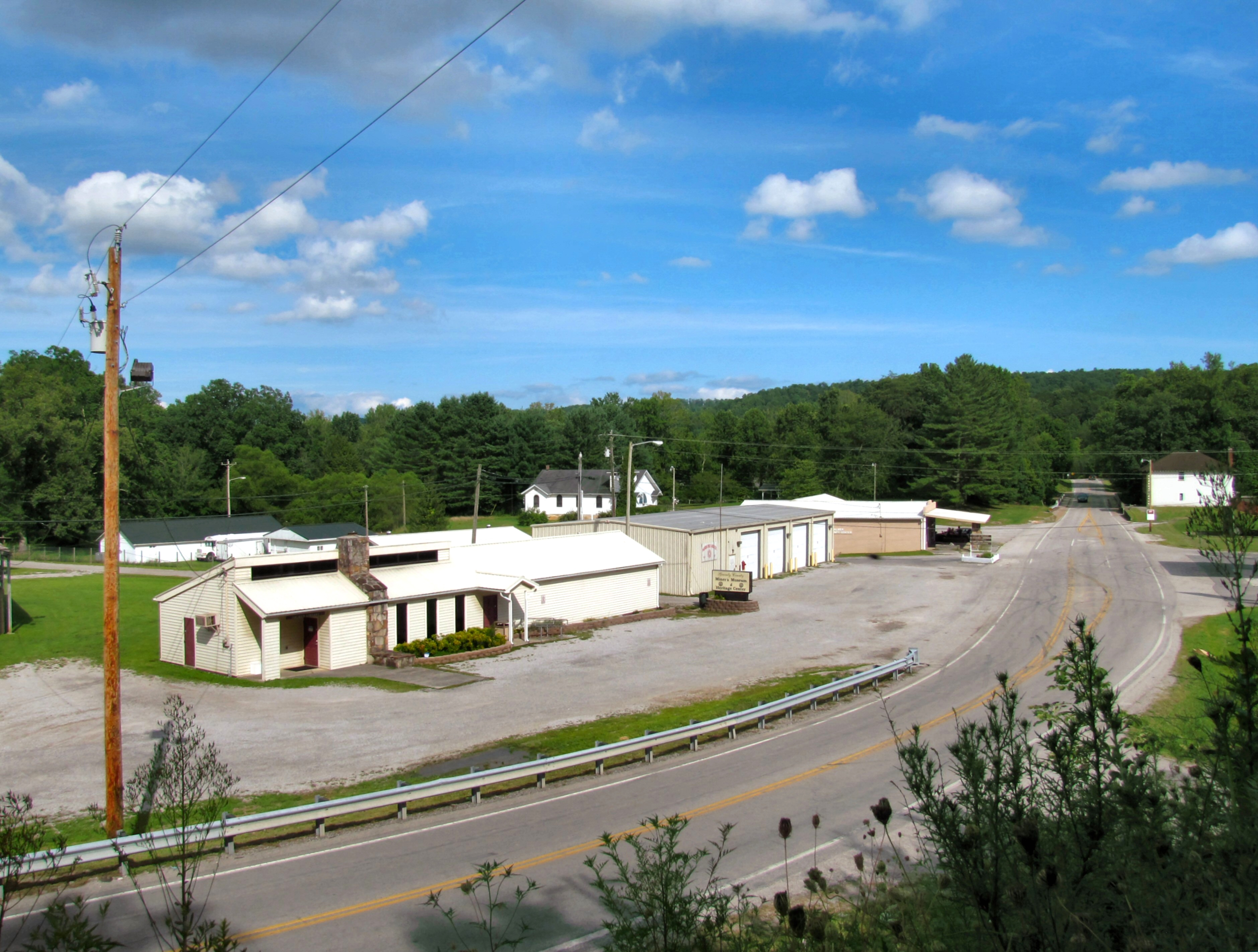
- TN-108 passing through Palmer

- Location of Palmer in Grundy County, Tennessee.
- Coordinates: 35°21′23″N 85°33′43″W
- Country: United States
- State: Tennessee
- County: Grundy
- Incorporated: 1925

Area
  - Total: 4.93 sq mi (12.77 km^{2})
  - Land: 4.93 sq mi (12.77 km^{2})
  - Water: 0 sq mi (0.00 km^{2})
- Elevation: 1,805 ft (550 m)

Population (2020)
  - Total: 551
  - Density: 111.8/sq mi (43.15/km^{2})
- Time zone: UTC-6 (Central (CST))
  - Summer (DST): UTC-5 (CDT)
- ZIP code: 37365
- Area code: 931
- FIPS code: 47-56560
- GNIS feature ID: 1296690

Palmer is a town in Grundy County, Tennessee, United States. As of the 2020 census, Palmer had a population of 551.

== History ==
Palmer was originally known as "Tate's Village". When it incorporated in 1925, it was renamed in honor of Clarence William Palmer (1850–1919), who owned much of the land upon which the town was established. The town thrived during the early 20th century due in large part to mining operations conducted in the area by the Tennessee Consolidated Coal Company.

== Geography ==
Palmer is located in southeastern Grundy County at 35°21′23″N 85°33′43″W (35.356381, -85.561987). It lies in a rugged area atop the Cumberland Plateau, just west of the Plateau's Sequatchie Valley escarpment. The point where Grundy, Marion, and Sequatchie counties meet is located just south of Palmer. Tennessee State Route 108 passes through Palmer, connecting the town with Gruetli-Laager to the west and Whitwell in the Sequatchie Valley to the southeast. The source of the 67-mile (108 km) Collins River is located just northeast of Palmer.

According to the United States Census Bureau, the town has a total area of 4.9 square miles (12.8 km^{2}), all of it land.

== Demographics ==
Historical population
Census	Pop.	Note	%±
1930	1,158		—
1940	1,228		6.0%
1950	871		−29.1%
1960	1,069		22.7%
1970	898		−16.0%
1980	1,027		14.4%
1990	769		−25.1%
2000	726		−5.6%
2010	672		−7.4%
2020	551		−18.0%

=== 2020 census ===
Palmer racial composition
Race	Number	Percentage
White (non-Hispanic)	519	94.19%
Asian	1	0.18%
Other/Mixed	29	5.26%
Hispanic or Latino	2	0.36%

As of the 2020 United States census, there were 551 people, 233 households, and 156 families residing in the town.

=== 2000 census ===
As of the census of 2000, there were 726 people, 305 households, and 207 families residing in the town. The population density was 138.0 inhabitants per square mile (53.3/km^{2}). There were 331 housing units at an average density of 62.9 per square mile (24.3/km^{2}). The racial makeup of the town was 98.76% White, and 1.24% from two or more races. Hispanic or Latino of any race were 0.28% of the population.

There were 305 households, out of which 22.6% had children under the age of 18 living with them, 51.5% were married couples living together, 13.1% had a female householder with no husband present, and 32.1% were non-families. 28.5% of all households were made up of individuals, and 11.8% had someone living alone who was 65 years of age or older. The average household size was 2.38 and the average family size was 2.93.

In the town, the population was spread out, with 21.3% under the age of 18, 6.5% from 18 to 24, 26.9% from 25 to 44, 27.5% from 45 to 64, and 17.8% who were 65 years of age or older. The median age was 41 years. For every 100 females, there were 95.2 males. For every 100 females age 18 and over, there were 94.2 males.

The median income for a household in the town was $19,167, and the median income for a family was $23,929. Males had a median income of $29,167 versus $17,292 for females. The per capita income for the town was $10,251. About 23.8% of families and 27.1% of the population were below the poverty line, including 30.1% of those under age 18 and 23.3% of those age 65 or over.

== Notable people ==
- The artist Jon Coffelt spent a good part of his childhood with his grandparents in Palmer. His grandfather John Ervin Coffelt taught him how to paint at eight years old.
