= Altamont, Tennessee =

- Town
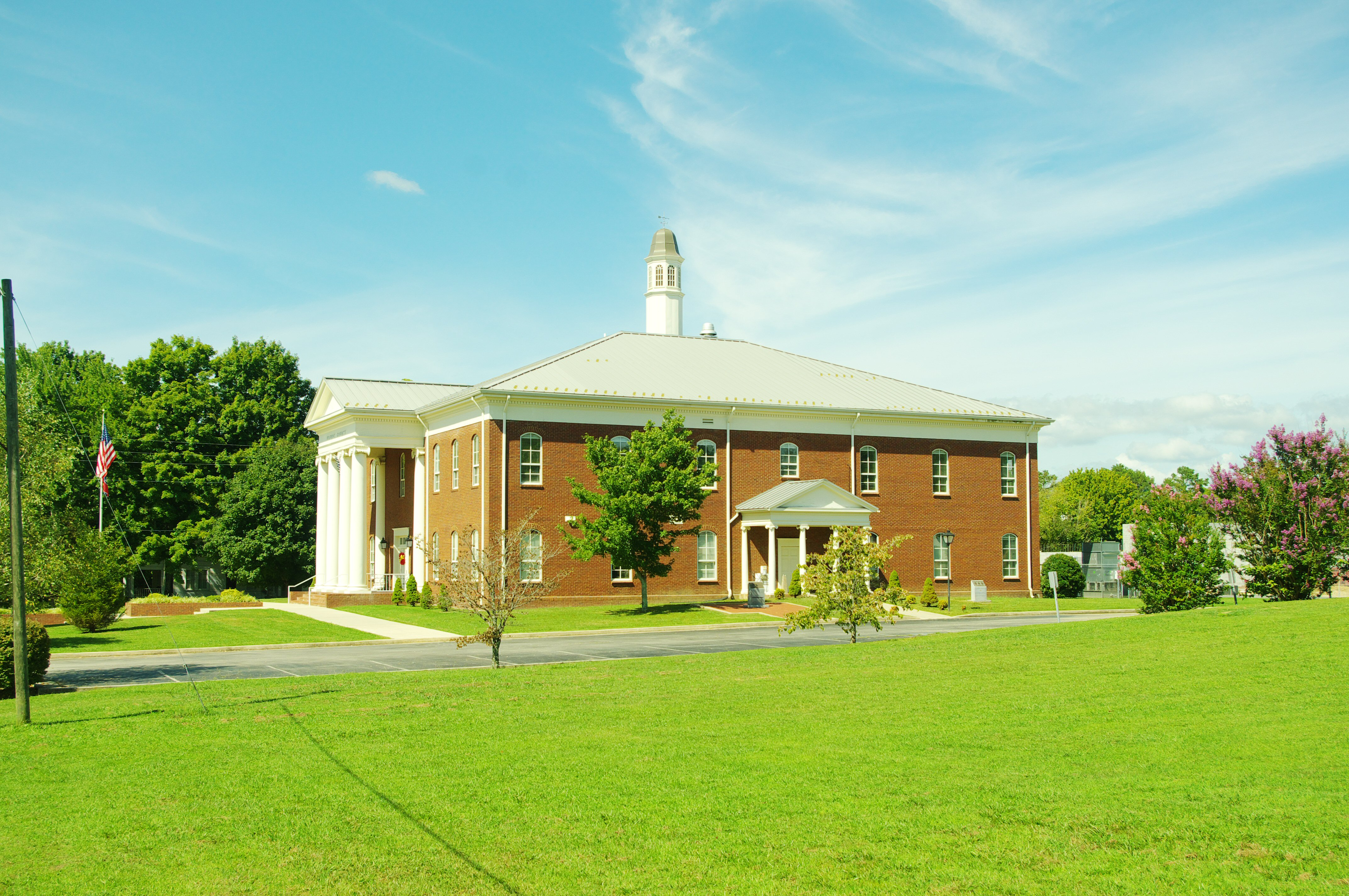
- Grundy County Courthouse in Altamont

- Location of Altamont in Grundy County, Tennessee.
- Coordinates: 35°26′2″N 85°43′57″W
- Country: United States
- State: Tennessee
- County: Grundy
- Established: 1848
- Incorporated: 1854
- Named for: Fusion of alto ("altitude") and mont ("mountain")

Area
  - Total: 19.83 sq mi (51.35 km^{2})
  - Land: 19.83 sq mi (51.35 km^{2})
  - Water: 0 sq mi (0.00 km^{2})
- Elevation: 1,854 ft (565 m)

Population (2020)
  - Total: 1,117
  - Density: 56.3/sq mi (21.75/km^{2})
- Time zone: UTC-6 (Central (CST))
  - Summer (DST): UTC-5 (CDT)
- ZIP code: 37301
- Area code: 931
- FIPS code: 47-00940
- GNIS feature ID: 1275640
- Website: https://altamont.city/

Altamont is a town in and the county seat of Grundy County, Tennessee, United States. The population was 1,117 at the 2020 census.

== History ==
Altamont was established in 1848 as a county seat for Grundy County, which had been created in 1844. General Adrian Northcutt, a prominent local farmer and military officer, was the prime advocate for the site's selection. The town's name comes from combining alto (meaning "altitude") and mont (meaning "mountain"). Although the Civil War somewhat stunted the town's growth, by 1870 Altamont's population had grown to 217.

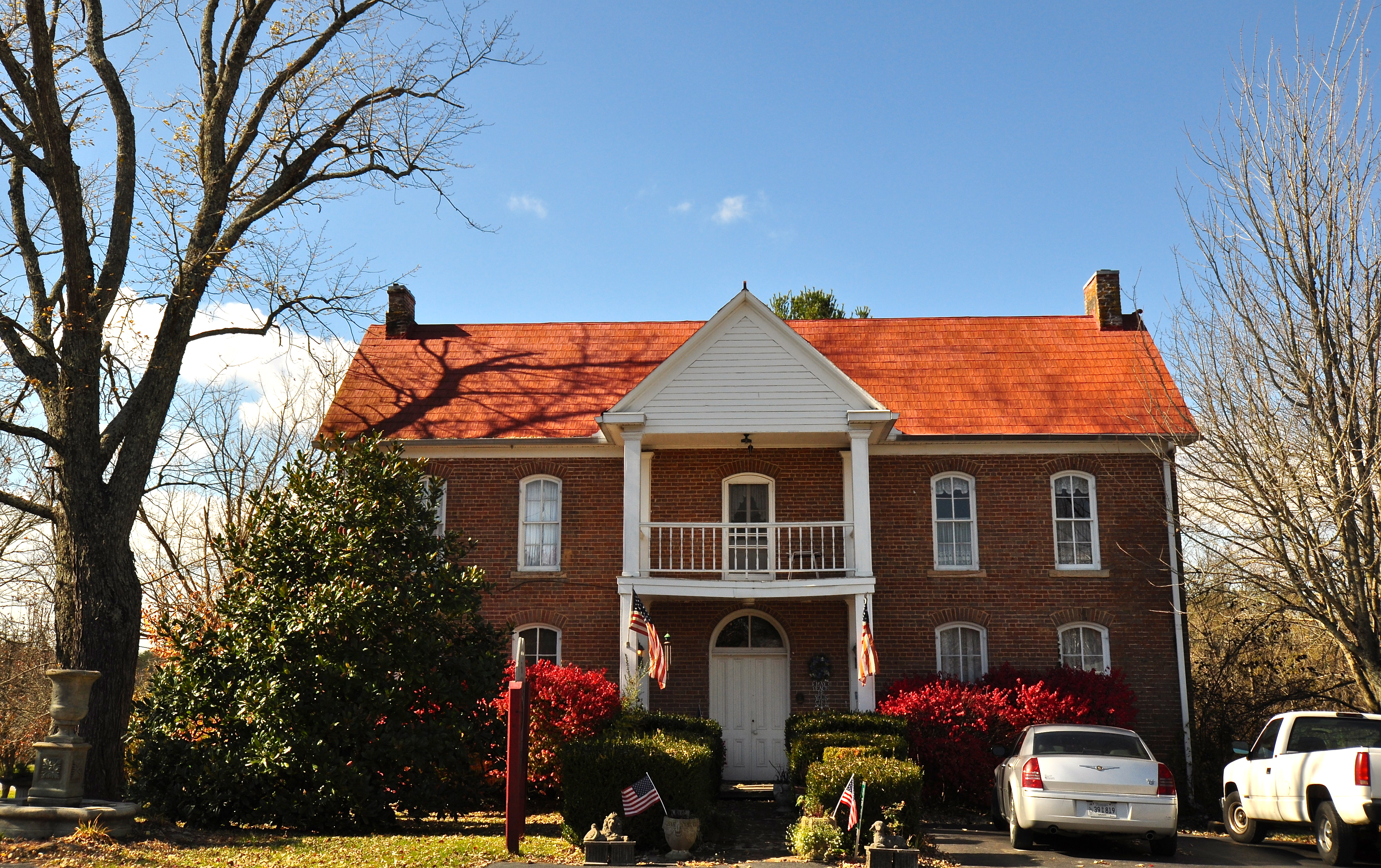
The Northcutt House, built in 1885

Altamont has one of the oldest Mormon congregations in the southeastern United States. The congregation was formed in the 1890s, and a Mormon chapel was built in Northcutt Cove just north of Altamont in 1909. Shortly thereafter, several members of the congregation migrated to Altamont. A Mormon chapel was completed along Main Street in 1947, and a newer chapel was completed just off Viola Road in 1981.

In 1988, Altamont's school building was renovated and now houses the Altamont City Hall and the Altamont Library and Museum. The building was renamed the "Florence R. Scruggs Municipal Building" in 1996, after a long-time teacher at the school.

== Geography ==
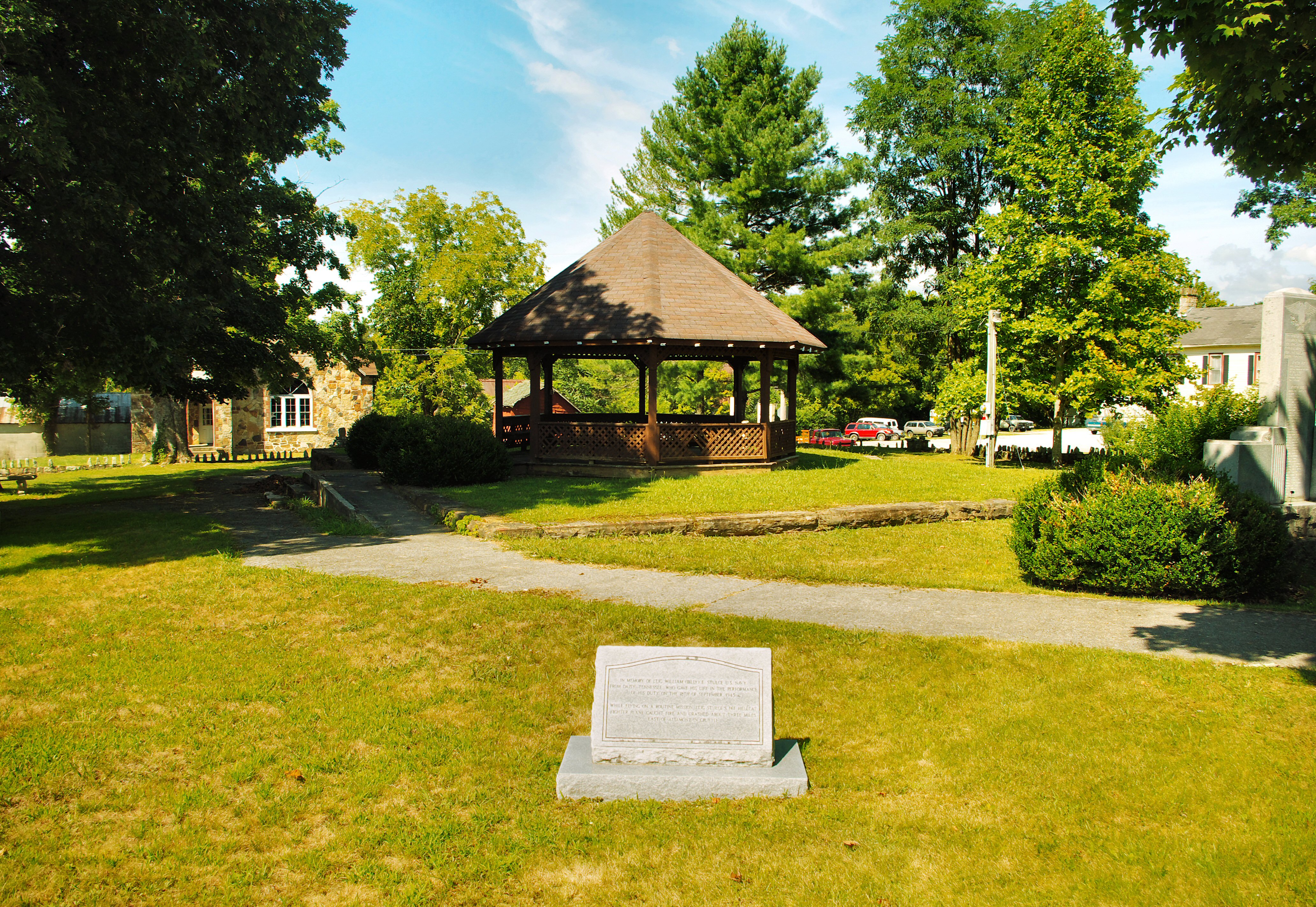
Veterans' Park in Altamont

Altamont is located in north-central Grundy County at 35°26′2″N 85°43′57″W (35.433954, -85.732428). It is situated atop the southern Cumberland Plateau between the plateau's Highland Rim escarpment to the west and Savage Gulf to the east. The latter is a gorge sliced by the upper watershed of the Collins River (Altamont is part of this watershed) as the river descends from the plateau to the Highland Rim en route to its mouth at the Caney Fork in adjacent Warren County. Altamont is surrounded by hills on all sides, and the central area of the town itself straddles a flattened-out hillslope.

Several state highways intersect at the center of Altamont. Tennessee State Route 56 (Main Street) connects Altamont to Beersheba Springs and McMinnville to the north and Coalmont, Tracy City and Monteagle to the south. Tennessee State Route 108, connects the town to Viola and McMinnville to the northwest and Whitwell to the southeast. Tennessee State Route 50 connects Altamont to Pelham and Interstate 24 to the southwest.

According to the United States Census Bureau, the town has a total area of 20.2 square miles (52.2 km^{2}), all land.

== Demographics ==
Historical population
Census	Pop.	Note	%±
1880	110		—
1890	67		−39.1%
1920	114		—
1930	140		22.8%
1940	238		70.0%
1950	296		24.4%
1960	552		86.5%
1970	546		−1.1%
1980	679		24.4%
1990	679		0.0%
2000	1,136		67.3%
2010	1,045		−8.0%
2020	1,117		6.9%

=== 2020 census ===
Altamont racial composition
Race	Number	Percentage
White (non-Hispanic)	1,043	93.38%
Black or African American (non-Hispanic)	1	0.09%
Native American	4	0.36%
Asian	4	0.36%
Other/Mixed	52	4.66%
Hispanic or Latino	13	1.16%

As of the 2020 United States census, there were 1,117 people, 362 households, and 240 families residing in the town.

=== 2000 census ===
As of the census of 2000, there were 1,136 people, 400 households, and 309 families residing in the town. The population density was 51.5 inhabitants per square mile (19.9/km^{2}). There were 438 housing units at an average density of 19.9 per square mile (7.7/km^{2}). The racial makeup of the town was 97.89% White, 0.09% African American, 0.53% Native American, 0.09% Asian, 0.88% from other races, and 0.53% from two or more races. Hispanic or Latino of any race were 2.02% of the population.

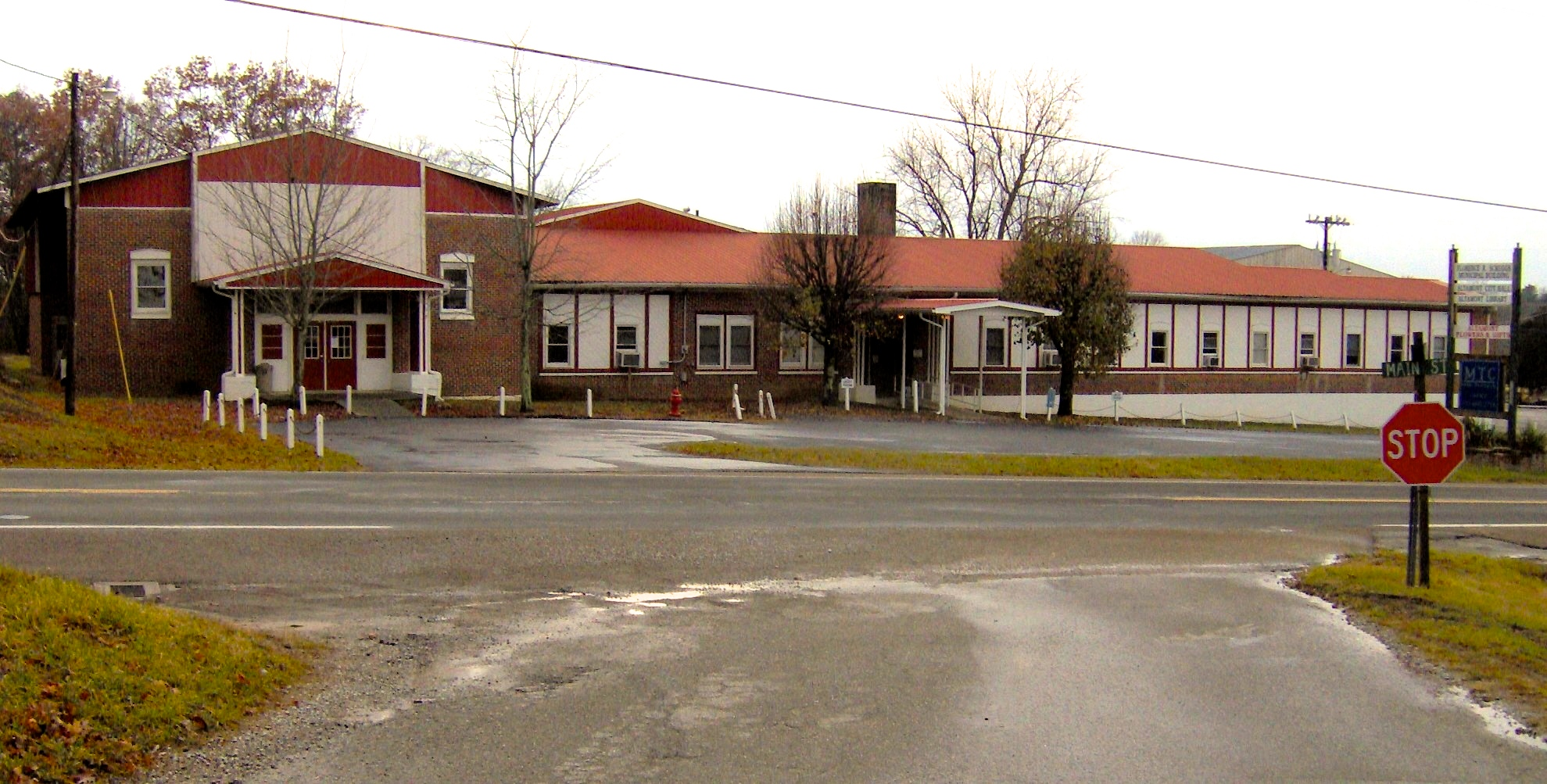
Altamont City Hall

There were 400 households, out of which 38.3% had children under the age of 18 living with them, 62.3% were married couples living together, 10.0% had a female householder with no husband present, and 22.8% were non-families. 20.0% of all households were made up of individuals, and 5.8% had someone living alone who was 65 years of age or older. The average household size was 2.76 and the average family size was 3.15.

In the town, the population was spread out, with 27.3% under the age of 18, 9.3% from 18 to 24, 30.1% from 25 to 44, 22.1% from 45 to 64, and 11.2% who were 65 years of age or older. The median age was 33 years. For every 100 females, there were 108.8 males. For every 100 females age 18 and over, there were 113.4 males.

The median income for a household in the town was $21,767, and the median income for a family was $25,000. Males had a median income of $26,944 versus $15,000 for females. The per capita income for the town was $10,074. About 28.9% of families and 32.1% of the population were below the poverty line, including 34.4% of those under age 18 and 32.4% of those age 65 or over.

== Notable people ==
- Arlo Gilliam, singer-songwriter
