= Savage Gulf State Park =

State park in Tennessee, United States

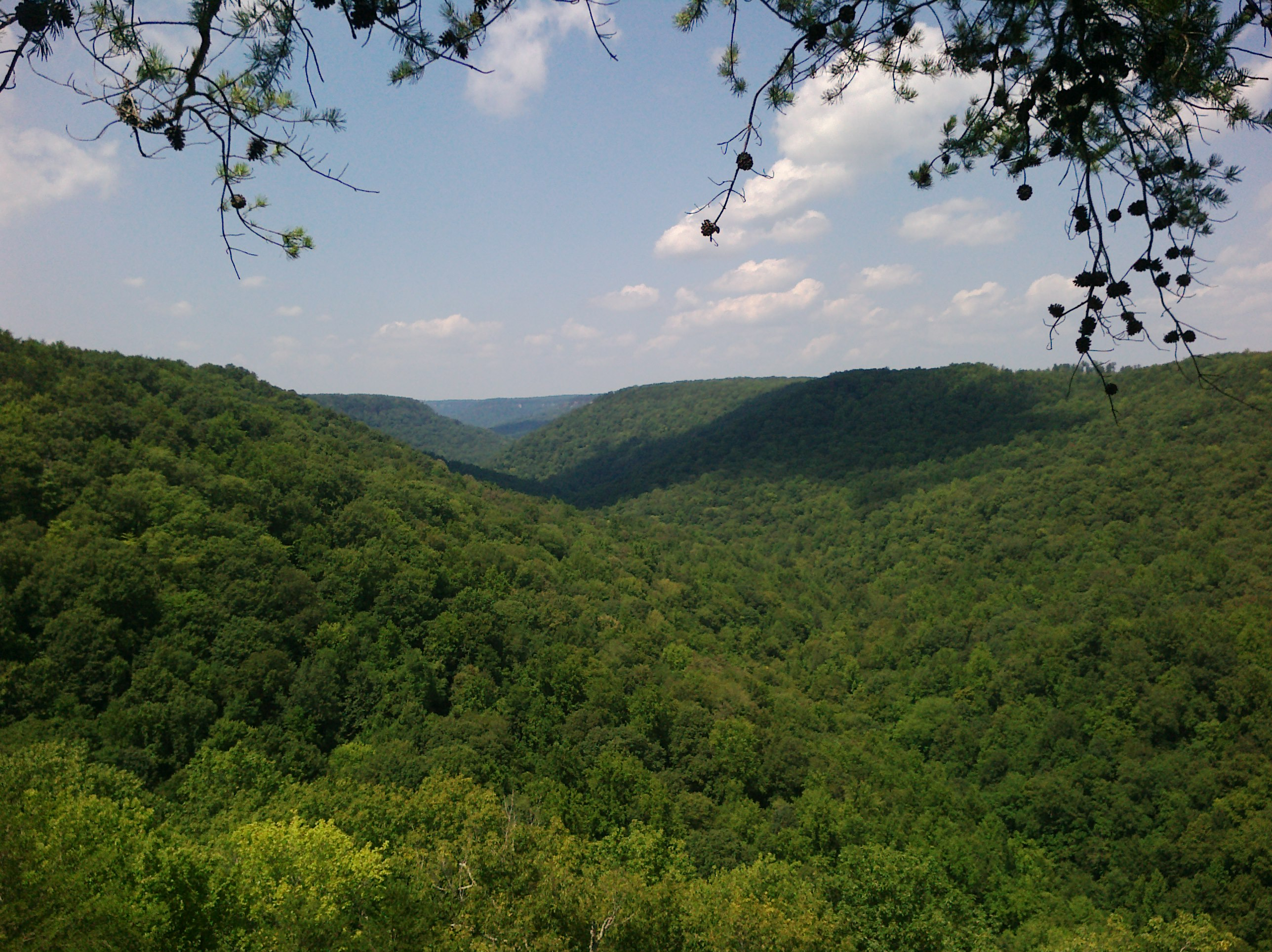
- Savage Gulf State Natural Area, August 2012
- Interactive map of Savage Gulf State Park
- Location: Grundy County and Sequatchie County, Tennessee, United States
- Coordinates: 35°27′N 85°37′W
- Area: 19,000 acres (77 km^{2})
- Created: 2022
- Owner: Tennessee Department of Environment and Conservation
- Open: Year around
- Website: official website

Savage Gulf State Park is a state park in southern Middle Tennessee, United States. Spanning 19,000 acres (77 km^{2}), it has been named as a National Natural Landmark.

It was created in 2022 after being separated from South Cumberland State Park, which it had been part of for many years. South Cumberland State Park was considered to have grown too large to manage. The park will continue to be supported by the non-profit Friends of South Cumberland State Park.

The state park includes the Savage Gulf State Natural Area and the Stone Door area, both formerly managed under South Cumberland.

== Amenities ==
Savage Gulf contains nine backcountry campgrounds: Hobbs Cabin, Dinky Line, Savage Falls, Stagecoach Road, Collins West, Savage Station, Alum Gap, Sawmill, and Stone Door, that can be reserved online. The park also features a gift shop located at the Stone Door entrance of the park and three picnic areas.
