= Coalmont Bank Building =

- U.S. National Register of Historic Places
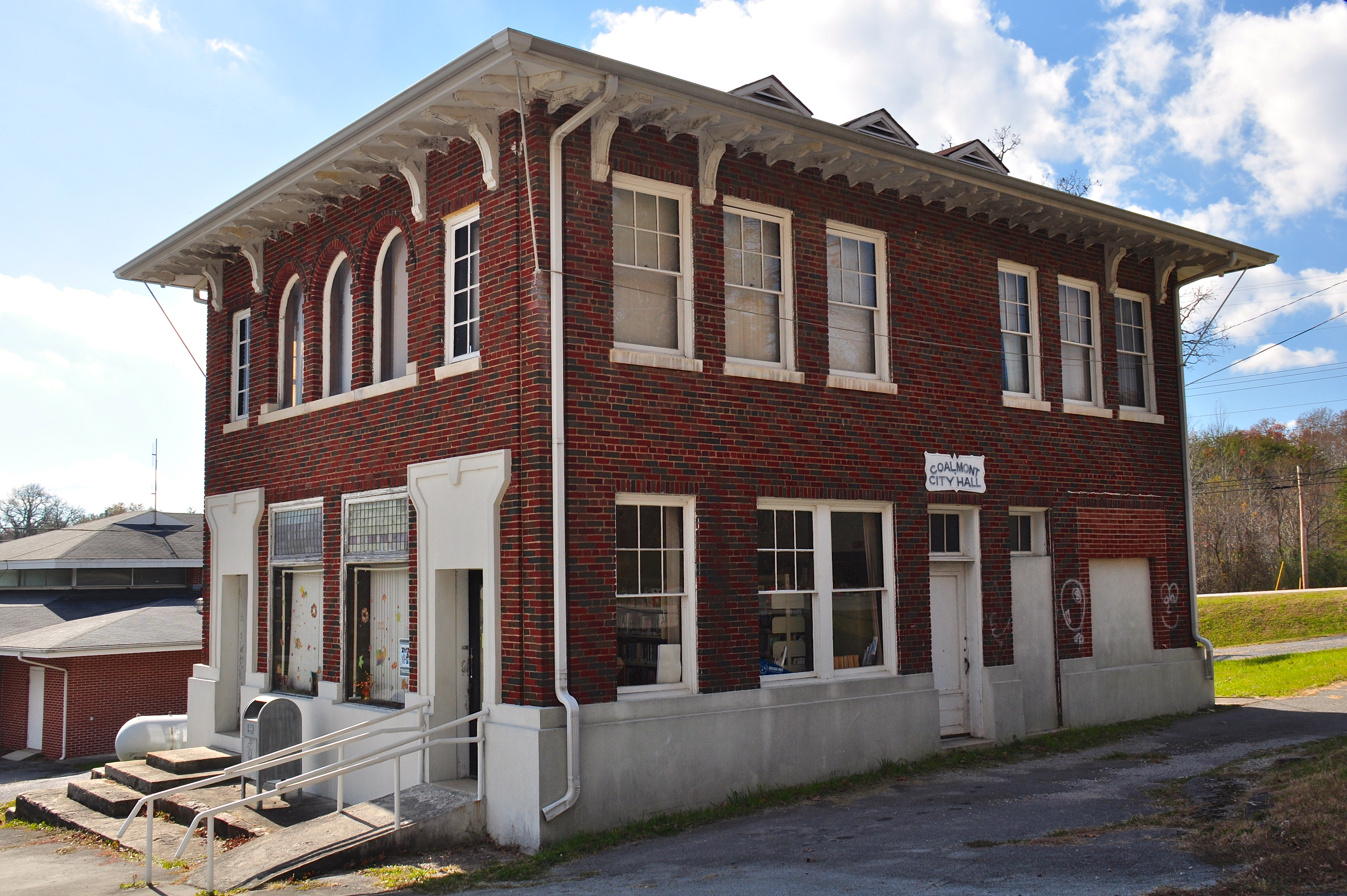
- Coalmont Bank Building, November 2014.

- Location within Tennessee Location within the United States
- Location: Coalmont, Tennessee, USA
- Coordinates: 35°20′21.4″N 85°42′11.6″W
- Architectural style: Classical Revival, Bungalow/Craftsman
- NRHP reference No.: 91000246
- Added to NRHP: March 14, 1991

The Coalmont Bank Building, also known as Sewanee Fuel & Iron Company Building, is an historic building in Coalmont, Tennessee, United States, that now serves as the city hall and local library.

Coalmont was created as a company town in 1903, operated by the Sewanee Coal, Coke and Land Company, which reorganized in 1908 as the Sewanee Fuel and Iron Company. The company built the Coalmont Bank Building in 1921 to house both civic facilities and company offices. A bank and post office were located on the first floor and the company had its offices on the second floor.

Located on Tennessee State Route 56, the building was added to the National Register of Historic Places in 1991 as the Coalmont Bank Building.
