= Grundy County, Tennessee =

County in Tennessee, United States

- County
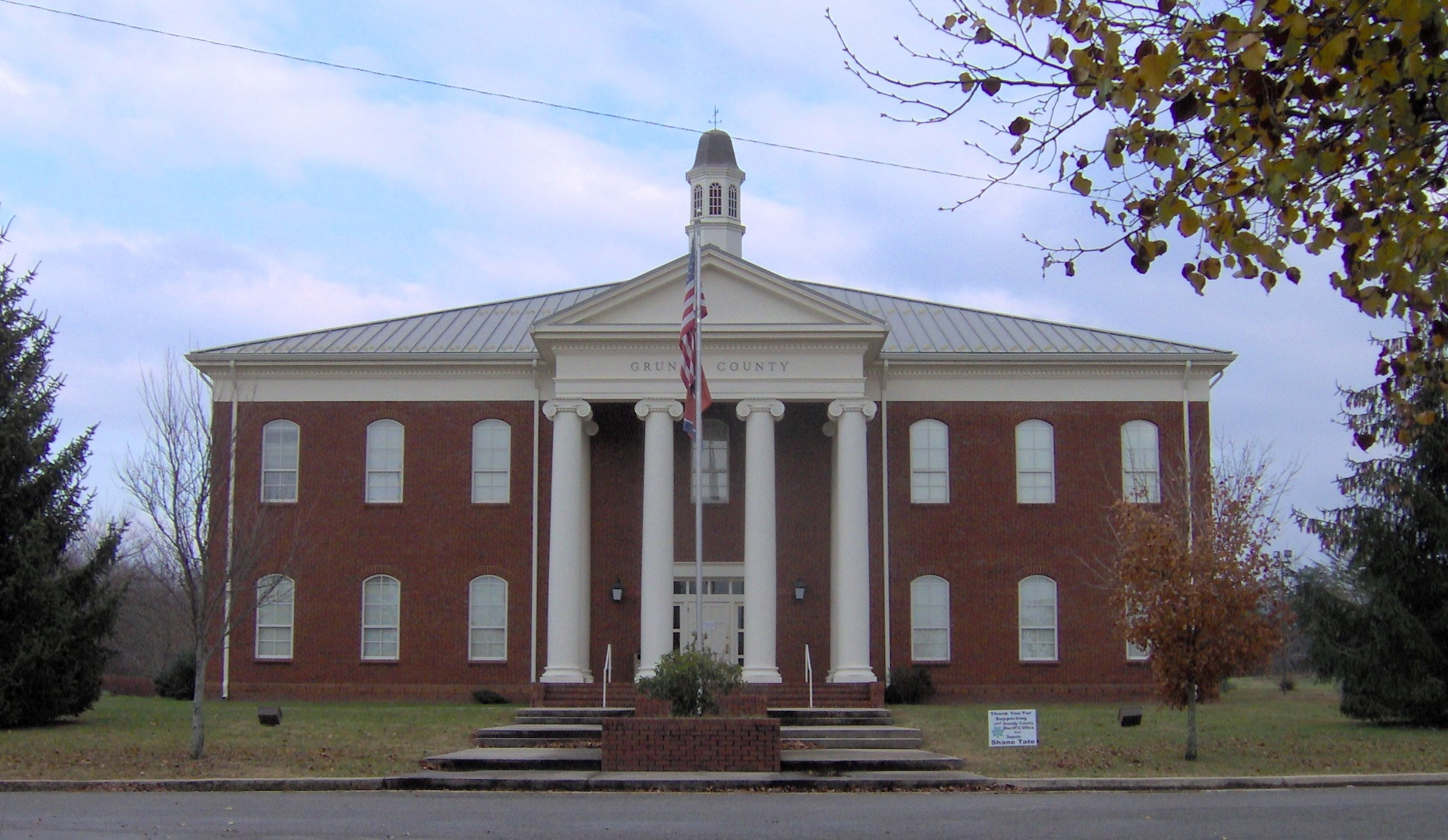
- Grundy County Courthouse in Altamont

- Seal

- Location within the U.S. state of Tennessee
- Coordinates: 35°23′N 85°43′W
- Country: United States
- State: Tennessee
- Founded: 1844
- Named for: Felix Grundy
- Seat: Altamont
- Largest city: Gruetli-Laager

Area
  - Total: 361 sq mi (930 km^{2})
  - Land: 361 sq mi (930 km^{2})
  - Water: 0.6 sq mi (1.6 km^{2}) 0.2%

Population (2020)
  - Total: 13,529
  - Estimate (2025): 14,116 ▲
  - Density: 38/sq mi (15/km^{2})
- Time zone: UTC−6 (Central)
  - Summer (DST): UTC−5 (CDT)
- Congressional district: 4th
- Website: grundycountytn.net

Grundy County is a county located in the U.S. state of Tennessee. It is located in Middle Tennessee, bordering East Tennessee. As of the 2020 census, the population was 13,529. Its county seat is Altamont. The county is named in honor of Felix Grundy.

== History ==
Grundy County is the home of the South Cumberland State Park which offers hiking, camping, and rock climbing. Most of Grundy County is atop the Cumberland Plateau averaging a height of around 1,800 feet above sea level. The county seat of Grundy County is Altamont, founded in the 1840s.

Thirty years before the Civil War, the resort town of Beersheba Springs was founded around a natural mineral springs near the current site of a wilderness area known as the Savage Gulf.

In the mid-1860s, the town of Gruetli-Laager was formed by an immigrant population from Switzerland. Today many of the original family names are found amongst the local population. Today some people, on their way to Fiery Gizzard and Foster Falls, will pass through the town of Tracy City. Tracy City is home to the Grundy County Historical Society which is located in the Tennessee Consolidated Coal Company Library & Research Center and is staffed daily by local residents who assist visitors with tours of the museum and offer assistance for genealogical research.

Nearby Tracy City is the Grundy Lakes Park. This park, which surrounds a series of mountain lakes and streams, offers swimming, picnic areas and a lengthy paved road used by runners and walkers. The lake is bordered by a honey comb of Coke Ovens that remain from when coal was mined in the area.

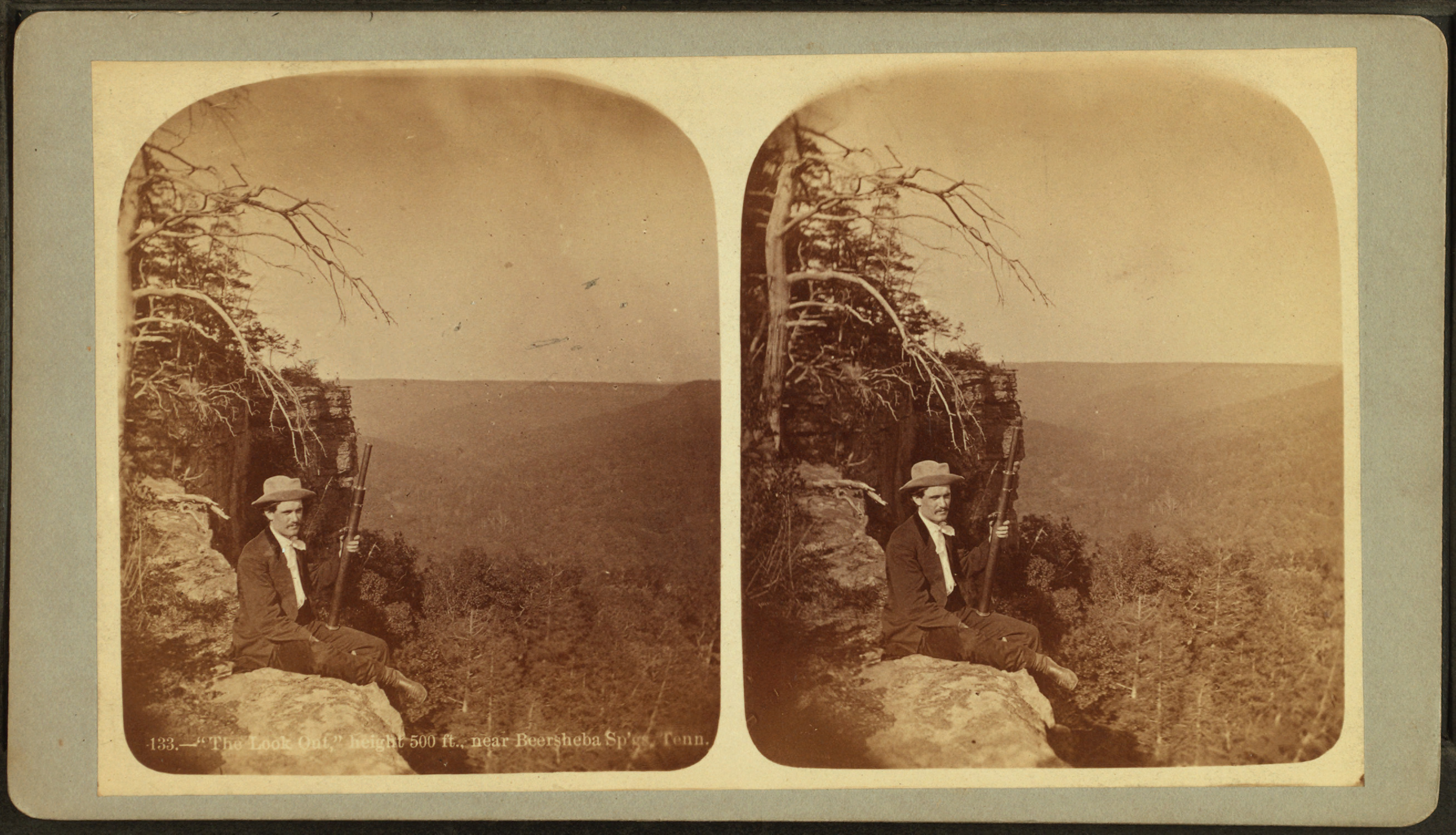
Stereo card c. 1900 showing "The Look Out," now called Stone Door Overlook, at Savage Gulf State Park near Beersheba Springs.

The county has several saltpeter mines. Saltpeter is the main ingredient of gunpowder and was obtained by leaching the earth from several local caves. Fultz Saltpeter Cave, located in Fultz Cove, and Hubbard Saltpeter Cave, located in Hubbard Cove, were both significant operations. Woodlee Cave, located in Northcutts Cove, was also mined for saltpeter. Saltpeter was mined during both the War of 1812 and the Civil War, so these caves may have been mined during either, or both, time periods.

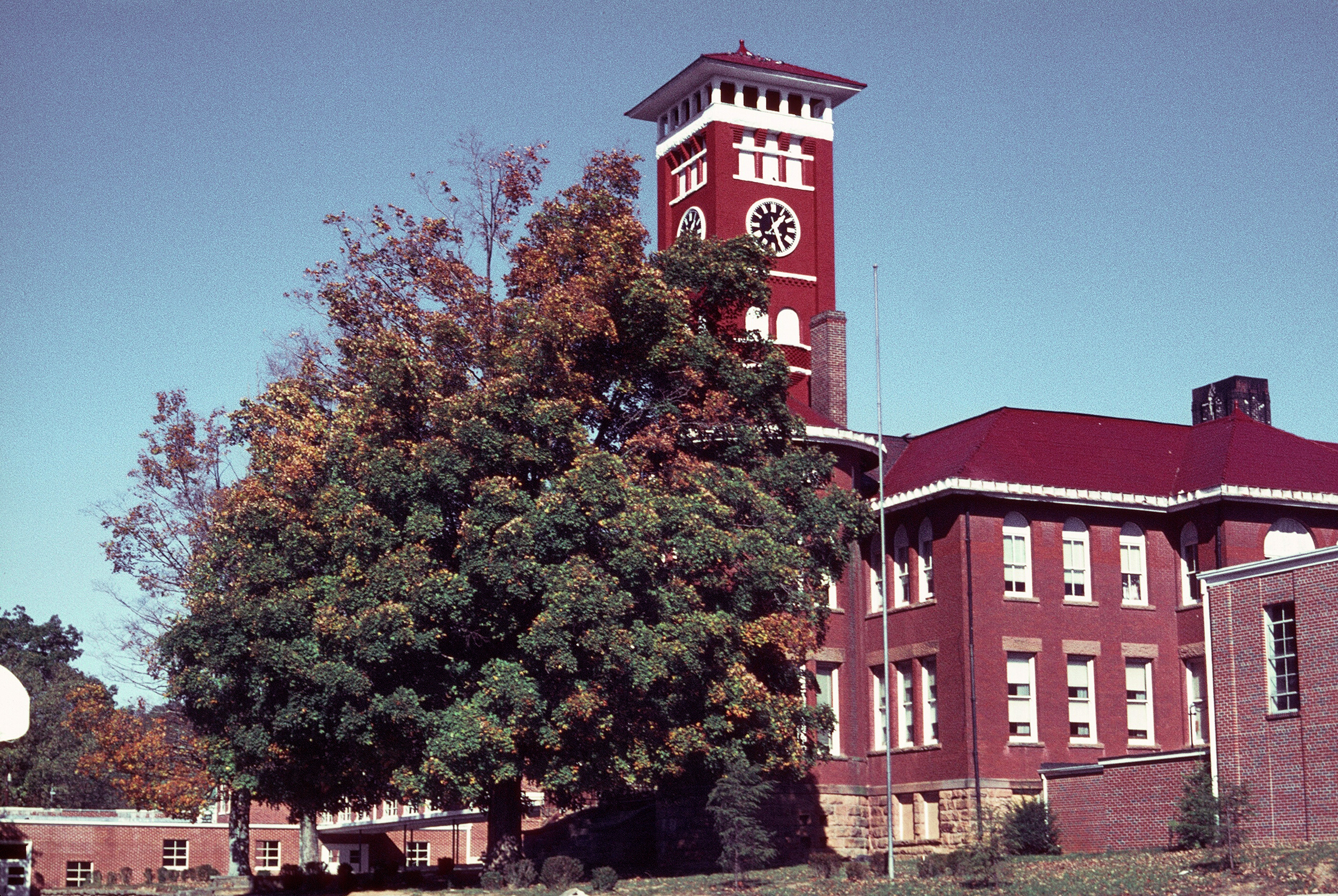
James K. Shook School is but one of many buildings to succumb to arson in Grundy County.

In the 20th century, Grundy County earned a reputation for arson. The business district of Tracy City was nearly destroyed when ten buildings were wiped out by an intentional blaze on April 27, 1935. The Tracy City L&N Depot combusted after a century on August 24, 1971. The sheriff reported 21 other fires, mostly arson, prior to that in 1971 alone. After 86 years, James K. Shook School burned to the ground circa May 1976. In addition, the offices of the Grundy County Times was set ablaze in 1917, and the Herald office suffered an explosion in 1967 and was destroyed by arson in 1978. After 105 years standing, the Grundy County Courthouse was destroyed by arson on May 3, 1990.

Some vandals appear to favor dynamite. In the 1960s and 1970s, four dynamite blasts destroyed or damaged waterworks, another a lumber yard, and another a doctor's clinic. Such was the problem at abandoned county schools that insurance was difficult to obtain. Glenn Bonner, school superintendent at the time, said, "Just as soon as a building becomes vacant—boom!"

When asked about these crimes and others, Tennessee Bureau of Investigation's Bill Thompson downplayed the blazes saying, "I'm not going to say that Grundy County is any different than any other rural county. There are a ton of good people there".

== Geography ==
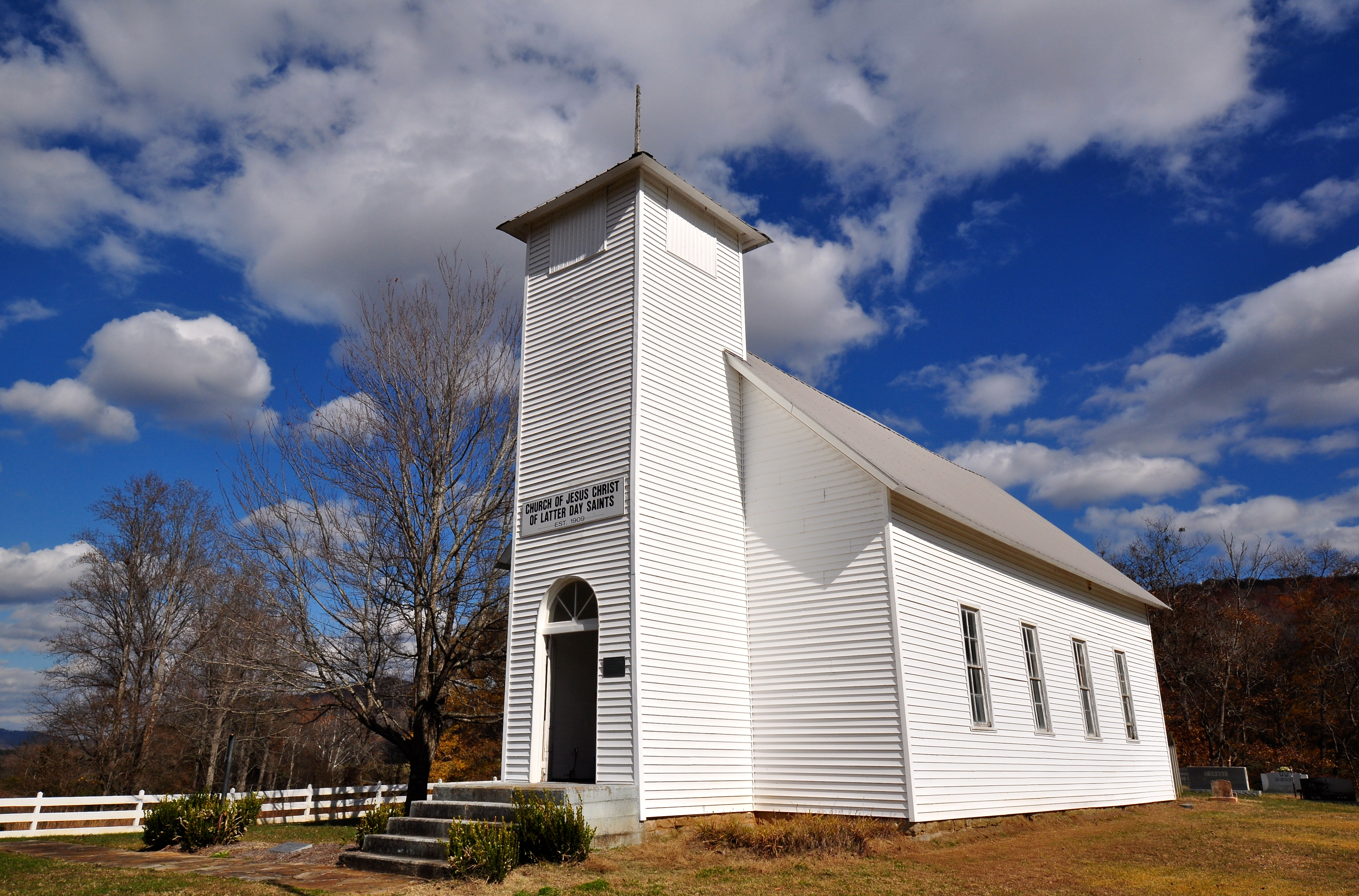
Northcutt's Cove Chapel near Altamont

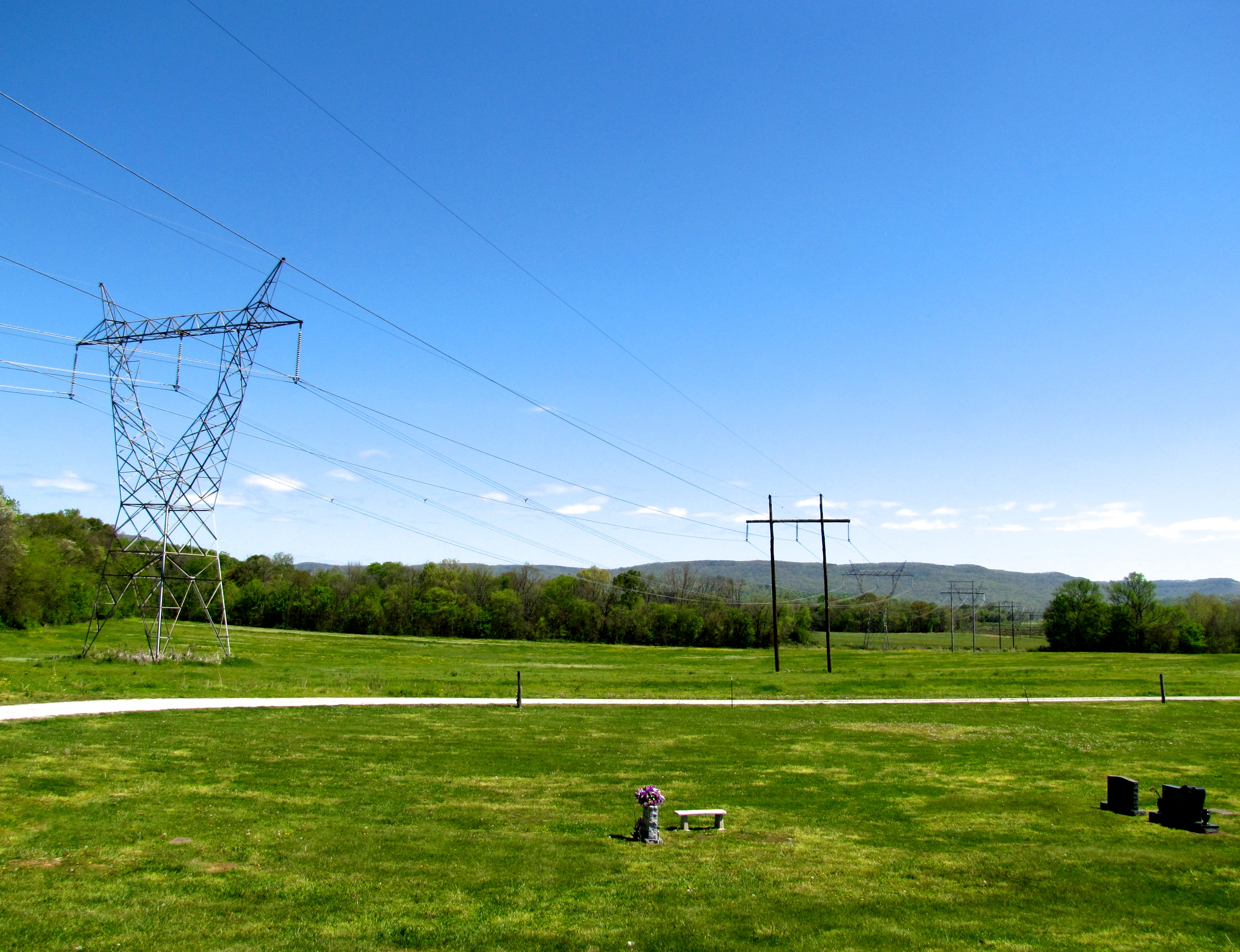
View near Pelham

According to the U.S. Census Bureau, the county has a total area of 361 square miles (930 km^{2}), of which 361 square miles (930 km^{2}) is land and 0.6 square miles (1.6 km^{2}) (0.2%) is water.

=== Natural features ===
Grundy County contains much of the Fiery Gizzard Trail, known for its scenery and diversity.

Wonder Cave is located on the north side of Layne's Cove at the foot of the Cumberland Plateau. It was discovered in 1897 by Robert A. Nelson, Melville Anderson, and Will Fitzgerald, who crawled into a small opening next to a large spring. In 1898, the cave was purchased by R. M. Payne who enlarged the small opening, built trails, and opened the cave to the public as a commercial cave. Wonder Cave was a major tourist attraction for nearly 80 years, but construction of the Interstate Highway system diverted tourists away from the old, main highway, Highway 41, and the cave eventually closed.

=== Adjacent counties ===
- Warren County (north)
- Sequatchie County (east)
- Marion County (south)
- Franklin County (southwest)
- Coffee County (west)

=== State protected areas ===
- Grundy Forest State Natural Area
- Savage Gulf State Park (part)
- South Cumberland State Park (part)

=== Major highways ===
- I-24
- US 41
- US 64
- SR 50
- SR 56
- SR 108
- SR 399

== Demographics ==
Historical population
Census	Pop.	Note	%±
1850	2,773		—
1860	3,093		11.5%
1870	3,250		5.1%
1880	4,592		41.3%
1890	6,345		38.2%
1900	7,802		23.0%
1910	8,322		6.7%
1920	9,753		17.2%
1930	9,717		−0.4%
1940	11,552		18.9%
1950	12,558		8.7%
1960	11,512		−8.3%
1970	10,631		−7.7%
1980	13,787		29.7%
1990	13,362		−3.1%
2000	14,332		7.3%
2010	13,703		−4.4%
2020	13,529		−1.3%
2025 (est.)	14,116	▲	4.3%
U.S. Decennial Census; 1790-1960 1900-1990; 1990-2000 2010-2014

=== Racial and ethnic composition ===
Grundy County, Tennessee – Racial and ethnic composition Note: the US Census treats Hispanic/Latino as an ethnic category. This table excludes Latinos from the racial categories and assigns them to a separate category. Hispanics/Latinos may be of any race.
Race / ethnicity (NH = Non-Hispanic)	Pop 1980	Pop 1990	Pop 2000	Pop 2010	Pop 2020	% 1980	% 1990	% 2000	% 2010	% 2020
White alone (NH)	13,660	13,243	14,010	13,321	12,620	99.08%	99.11%	97.75%	97.21%	93.28%
Black or African American alone (NH)	2	18	19	36	38	0.01%	0.13%	0.13%	0.26%	0.28%
Native American or Alaska Native alone (NH)	5	27	42	63	33	0.04%	0.20%	0.29%	0.46%	0.24%
Asian alone (NH)	5	6	24	24	44	0.04%	0.04%	0.17%	0.18%	0.33%
Native Hawaiian or Pacific Islander alone (NH)	x	x	0	1	0	x	x	0.00%	0.01%	0.00%
Other race alone (NH)	0	0	2	4	22	0.00%	0.00%	0.01%	0.03%	0.16%
Mixed race or Multiracial (NH)	x	x	94	141	597	x	x	0.66%	1.03%	4.41%
Hispanic or Latino (any race)	115	68	141	113	175	0.83%	0.51%	0.98%	0.82%	1.29%
Total	13,787	13,362	14,332	13,703	13,529	100.00%	100.00%	100.00%	100.00%	100.00%

=== 2020 census ===
As of the 2020 census, the county had a population of 13,529, 5,405 households, and 3,320 families.

As of the 2020 census, the median age was 44.6 years, 20.4% of residents were under the age of 18, and 20.9% of residents were 65 years of age or older. For every 100 females there were 100.4 males, and for every 100 females age 18 and over there were 97.8 males.

As of the 2020 census, the racial makeup of the county was 93.7% White, 0.3% Black or African American, 0.2% American Indian and Alaska Native, 0.4% Asian, <0.1% Native Hawaiian and Pacific Islander, 0.5% from some other race, and 4.9% from two or more races. Hispanic or Latino residents of any race comprised 1.3% of the population.

As of the 2020 census, <0.1% of residents lived in urban areas, while 100.0% lived in rural areas.

As of the 2020 census, there were 5,405 households in the county, of which 29.0% had children under the age of 18 living in them. Of all households, 48.9% were married-couple households, 18.8% were households with a male householder and no spouse or partner present, and 26.0% were households with a female householder and no spouse or partner present. About 27.0% of all households were made up of individuals and 12.9% had someone living alone who was 65 years of age or older.

As of the 2020 census, there were 6,196 housing units, of which 12.8% were vacant. Among occupied housing units, 79.8% were owner-occupied and 20.2% were renter-occupied. The homeowner vacancy rate was 1.1% and the rental vacancy rate was 6.4%.

=== 2000 census ===
As of the census of 2000, there were 14,332 people, 5,562 households, and 4,054 families residing in the county. The population density was 40 people per square mile (15 people/km^{2}). There were 6,282 housing units at an average density of 17 per square mile (6.6/km^{2}). The racial makeup of the county was 98.33% White, 0.14% Black or African American, 0.30% Native American, 0.17% Asian, 0.35% from other races, and 0.71% from two or more races. 0.98% of the population were Hispanic or Latino of any race.

There were 5,562 households, out of which 33.40% had children under the age of 18 living with them, 56.60% were married couples living together, 12.00% had a female householder with no husband present, and 27.10% were non-families. 24.00% of all households were made up of individuals, and 10.20% had someone living alone who was 65 years of age or older. The average household size was 2.54 and the average family size was 3.01.

In the county, the population was spread out, with 25.10% under the age of 18, 9.00% from 18 to 24, 27.80% from 25 to 44, 24.10% from 45 to 64, and 14.00% who were 65 years of age or older. The median age was 37 years. For every 100 females there were 96.70 males. For every 100 females age 18 and over, there were 94.30 males.

The median income for a household in the county was $22,959, and the median income for a family was $27,691. Males had a median income of $27,063 versus $17,447 for females. The per capita income for the county was $12,039. About 22.60% of families and 25.80% of the population were below the poverty line, including 31.50% of those under age 18 and 23.60% of those age 65 or over.

== Communities ==
=== Cities ===
- Coalmont
- Gruetli-Laager

=== Towns ===
- Altamont (county seat)
- Beersheba Springs
- Monteagle (also in Franklin and Marion Counties)
- Palmer
- Tracy City

=== Census-designated place ===
- Pelham

== Politics ==
United States presidential election results for Grundy County, Tennessee
Year	Republican		Democratic		Third party(ies)	
Year	No.	%	No.	%	No.	%
1880	63	12.02%	461	87.98%	0	0.00%
1884	188	24.32%	585	75.68%	0	0.00%
1888	216	18.77%	901	78.28%	34	2.95%
1892	236	22.29%	779	73.56%	44	4.15%
1896	286	21.80%	997	75.99%	29	2.21%
1900	357	29.21%	852	69.72%	13	1.06%
1904	264	27.59%	554	57.89%	139	14.52%
1908	261	26.61%	576	58.72%	144	14.68%
1912	122	14.20%	529	61.58%	208	24.21%
1916	319	27.55%	736	63.56%	103	8.89%
1920	447	32.99%	745	54.98%	163	12.03%
1924	173	22.64%	394	51.57%	197	25.79%
1928	380	38.31%	608	61.29%	4	0.40%
1932	198	16.62%	978	82.12%	15	1.26%
1936	238	13.76%	1,488	86.01%	4	0.23%
1940	298	14.49%	1,749	85.07%	9	0.44%
1944	406	21.52%	1,462	77.48%	19	1.01%
1948	431	16.74%	2,009	78.02%	135	5.24%
1952	709	21.47%	2,583	78.23%	10	0.30%
1956	918	30.36%	2,076	68.65%	30	0.99%
1960	786	26.55%	2,143	72.40%	31	1.05%
1964	686	19.82%	2,775	80.18%	0	0.00%
1968	618	17.33%	1,307	36.64%	1,642	46.03%
1972	1,364	54.49%	1,005	40.15%	134	5.35%
1976	850	22.84%	2,850	76.59%	21	0.56%
1980	1,139	28.34%	2,837	70.59%	43	1.07%
1984	1,396	34.77%	2,596	64.66%	23	0.57%
1988	1,429	37.05%	2,415	62.61%	13	0.34%
1992	1,004	22.89%	2,997	68.33%	385	8.78%
1996	1,094	27.03%	2,596	64.15%	357	8.82%
2000	1,553	33.79%	2,970	64.62%	73	1.59%
2004	2,107	42.75%	2,789	56.58%	33	0.67%
2008	2,563	55.33%	1,971	42.55%	98	2.12%
2012	2,516	59.38%	1,643	38.78%	78	1.84%
2016	3,636	76.34%	999	20.97%	128	2.69%
2020	4,802	82.02%	988	16.87%	65	1.11%
2024	5,334	84.29%	948	14.98%	46	0.73%

As part of Middle Tennessee, Grundy County has historically been one of the strongest Democratic counties in the state. It voted Democratic in every presidential election from 1880 to 2004, except for in 1968 (when segregationist George Wallace won the county), and 1972 when many traditional Democratic voters around the nation voted for incumbent Republican Richard Nixon. However, like most of the rural south, Grundy County has shifted towards the Republican Party in recent years, but was one of the last counties in Tennessee to make the switch to the party.

The last Democratic presidential candidate to win Grundy County was John Kerry in 2004, who won 18 out of Tennessee's 95 counties, whereas Al Gore won 36 in 2000. Grundy County was also won by Democratic U.S. senate candidates Bob Clement in 2002 and Harold Ford Jr. in 2006, both of whom lost. Republican presidential nominee John McCain won the county by nearly 13% in 2008, becoming the first Republican presidential candidate to win Grundy County since Nixon won it 36 years earlier, and by 2016, Grundy County had taken a major shift toward the GOP, when Republican Donald Trump received 76% of the vote, a figure closer to what is usually seen in historically Republican East Tennessee counties. He received even higher percentages of the vote in both 2020 and 2024, with both Joe Biden and Kamala Harris gaining less than 20% of Grundy's vote, and Harris being the first Democrat to gain less than 15% in the county's history.

Despite the sharp rightward shift in recent federal elections, Democrats remain active in local politics in Grundy County. In 2022, Democrats won the elections of County Mayor, County Circuit Clerk, and a couple of other offices.

== Notable people ==
- Ernst Leonhardt was born in Tracy City in 1885 to Swiss emigrants. While living in Switzerland, he became a National Front supporter and Nazi politician and propagandist. He died in an Allied air raid in southwestern Germany in March 1945.
- Right Rev. William Millsaps was the presiding bishop of the Episcopal Missionary Church, a former chaplain of the University of the South.
- P.R. Olgiati was the 55th mayor of Chattanooga and Democratic candidate for Governor of Tennessee in 1970.

== Cultural reference ==
Grundy County is featured in the country song Sold (The Grundy County Auction Incident) by John Michael Montgomery, as the place where the auction takes place.

== See also ==
- Grundy County High School
- National Register of Historic Places listings in Grundy County, Tennessee
