= Fiery Gizzard Trail =

Trail in eastern Tennessee, United States

Coordinates: 35.202°N 85.715°W

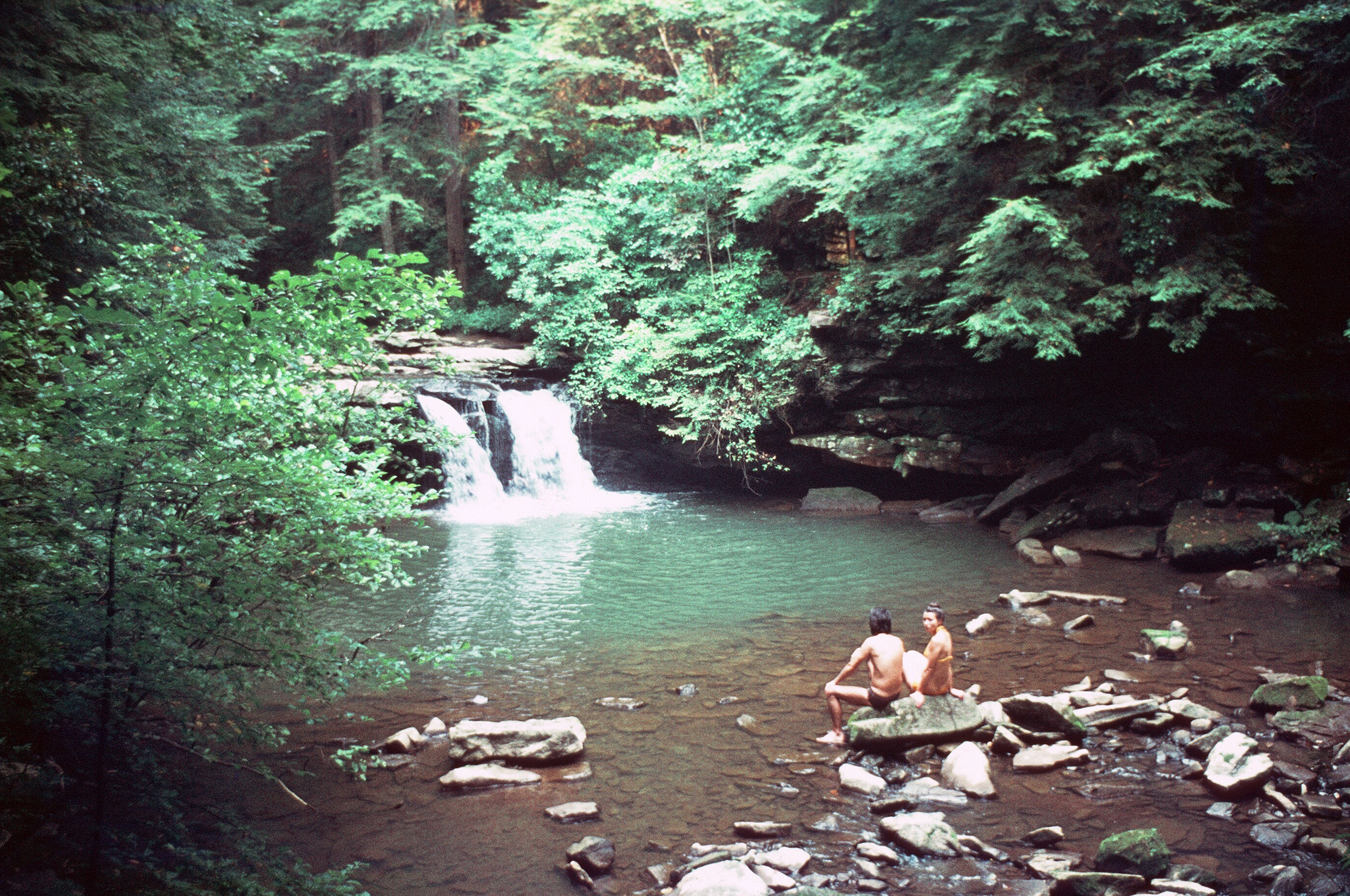
- The Blue Hole offers swimming near Tracy City
- Length: 12.5 mi (20.1 km)
- Location: Tennessee
- Trailheads: Tracy City to Foster Falls in Marion County
- Use: Hiking, Backpacking, rustic camping
- Difficulty: strenuous
- Surface: forest and loose rock

The Fiery Gizzard Trail runs from Tracy City, Tennessee to Foster Falls in Marion County, Tennessee. It is renowned for its beauty and diversity, cited by Backpacker magazine as one of the top 25 hiking trails in the United States. The 12.5-mile (20.1 km) trail offers scenic views, waterfalls, rock formations, and hemlock trees over 200 years old.

The trail follows Fiery Gizzard Creek for a time, then ascends 500 feet (150 m) to Raven Point which offers a "spectacular overlook." From there, the trail runs along the canyon rim to Foster Falls.

The trail is part of the South Cumberland State Park.

== History ==
Various legends exist to explain how the Fiery Gizzard creek, and thereby the trail alongside it, might have gotten its name. One suggests that, while eating a turkey at his camp along the creek, Davy Crockett burned his tongue on a gizzard and spit it into the gorge. Another holds that an Indian chief threw a turkey gizzard into the fire to get the attention of Europeans at a peace conference.

A historical marker near the Tracy City terminus recalls a "crude experimental blast furnace" built by Tennessee Coal and Railroad Company in the 1870s to determine if the coal could produce iron. The furnace, called "Fiery Gizzard," burned for three days, producing "only" 15 short tons (14 t), then the stovepipe collapsed.

In the 1930s, the Civilian Conservation Corps (CCC) company 1475 established camp near Tracy City where they dug several lakes and worked to prevent forest fires in the surrounding area. The CCC made improvements to the Fiery Gizzard Trail by building steps near the Fruit Bowl rock feature. They also built a pump house above the Blue Hole.

The trail, maintained as part of the South Cumberland State Park by the State of Tennessee, goes through the Grundy Forest State Natural Area and through the Foster Falls Wild Area owned by TVA, but half crosses private property, and a large portion of the views from the trail were, in 2010, owned by a timber investment company. The state and a coalition of conservation groups have purchased land to secure the vistas for the future.

== Terrain ==
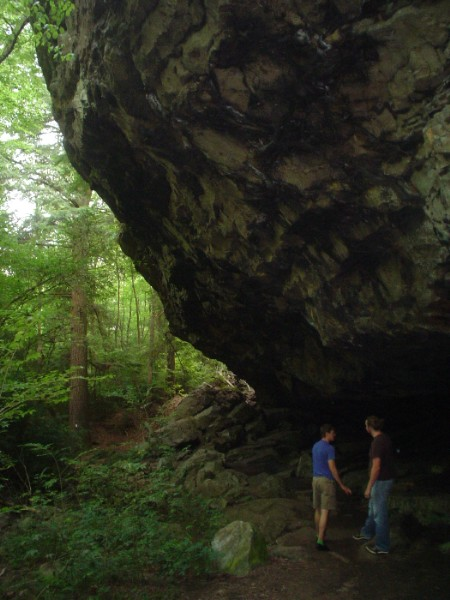
Diverse rocky formations such as this rock shelter draw hikers to the trail.

The Tracy City end of the Fiery Gizzard Trail is accessed via the relatively flat Grundy Forest Day Loop. The loop begins at the Grundy Forest State Natural Area Picnic Shelter, and after just 500 feet (150 m) presents hikers with a 20 feet (6.1 m) waterfall. Vestiges of the Civilian Conservation Corps camp S-67 can be seen another half mile down the walk. Hikers can see the confluence of Little and Big Fiery Gizzard Creeks, can cool off in three swimming holes, two with waterfalls.

The Fiery Gizzard trail begins roughly midway along the Day Loop, crossing a bridge across Little Fiery Gizzard Creek while the loop continues without crossing the bridge. Sights along the trail begin with a large rock shelter and a five-century-old Hemlock tree, the 7 feet (2.1 m) deep Blue Hole with 9 feet (2.7 m) waterfall, then Sycamore Falls, a "superb swimming hole" at the base of a 12 feet (3.7 m) fall. The trail then passes through the "Fruit Bowl," a pile of house-sized boulders with CCC-built stairs through them. Other features in this portion of the hike include Chimney Rock, a 20 feet (6.1 m) rock column, Black Canyon - so named because of organic stain on the rocks, and Crumbling Bluff - an area "honeycombed with pits and small caves."

After 3.7 miles (6.0 km), the trail begins an arduous climb to Raven Point, "possibly one of the most rugged and difficult trails in Tennessee." Raven Point offers a "spectacular overlook" on a spur .4 miles (0.64 km) off the main trail.

Continuing from there, the path mostly follows the flatter top of the Cumberland Plateau, except for a precarious .3 miles (0.48 km) horizontal 200 feet (61 m) vertical (each way) dip into Laurel Branch Gorge across myriad rocks that "all seem to move as you step on them."

There are four camping areas along the hike. A camping permit is required. Visitors are encouraged to leave the place as they found it.

== Flora and fauna ==
The Fiery Gizzard Trail offers hikers views of 636 types of vascular plants including mountain laurel, hemlock trees, beefsteak fungus, violets, Solomon's seals, Hepatica, trillium, dwarf crested iris, reindeer moss, and galax.

Myriad animals can also be found along the hike including bumblebees, hummingbirds, rattlesnakes, green snakes, red salamanders, crayfish. The snakes are not a special cause for concern as they are not particularly aggressive. One might even find oneself swimming with a mink at one of the many swimming holes.

== Property access ==
As of August 2015, South Cumberland State Park announced that the trail as it currently existed might have to close. Jim Southard Jr., a private property owner that had granted access to hikers, intended to sell his property and believed that the hikers negatively affected its value. In 2016, a second property owner, Hugh P. Liebert, asked the trail to be removed from his property as well. As a result, a massive volunteer effort, led by the park's managers and the Friends of South Cumberland group, was organized to build nearly two miles of new trail, below the properties in question, on state park property. Nearly 10,000 hours of volunteer effort resulted in getting the rerouted trail completed by the end of 2016.
