= Cagle, Tennessee =

Unincorporated community in Tennessee, US

Coordinates: 35°28′30″N 85°27′39″W

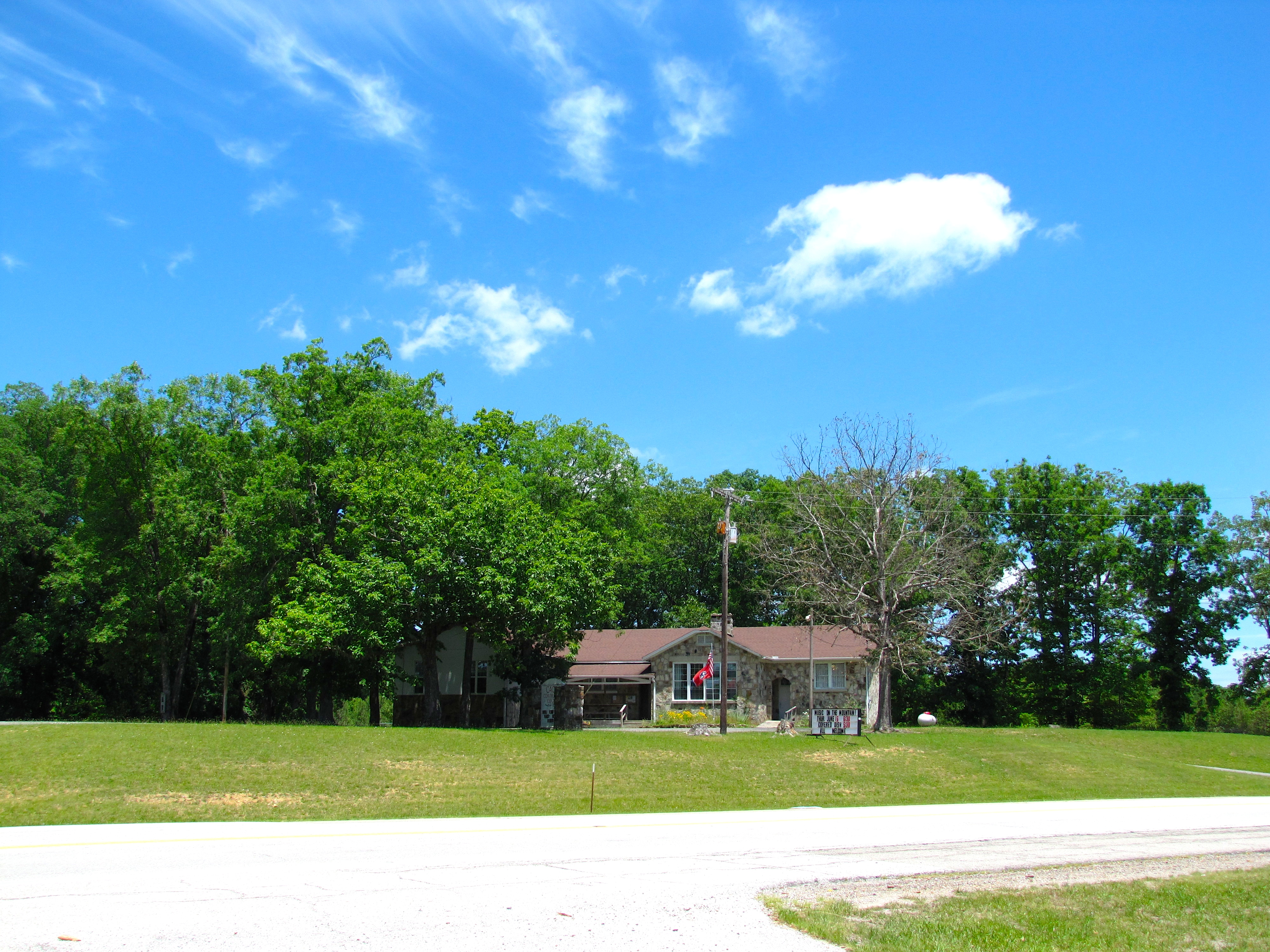
Cagle Community Center

Cagle (also known as Cagle Mountain) is an unincorporated community in Sequatchie County, Tennessee, United States. It is concentrated around the intersection of Tennessee State Route 111 and Tennessee State Route 399 atop the Cumberland Plateau in the western part of the county. Its elevation is 2,106 feet (642 m). The Tennessee Valley Divide passes through the community.

Cagle was originally known as "Mount Pleasant" after a Methodist church established in the area in the 1840s. When a post office was established in the community 1880, it was named "Cagle" after a family of early settlers.

Cagle is home to a community center, fire department, and several small businesses.
