= South Cumberland State Park =

State park in Tennessee

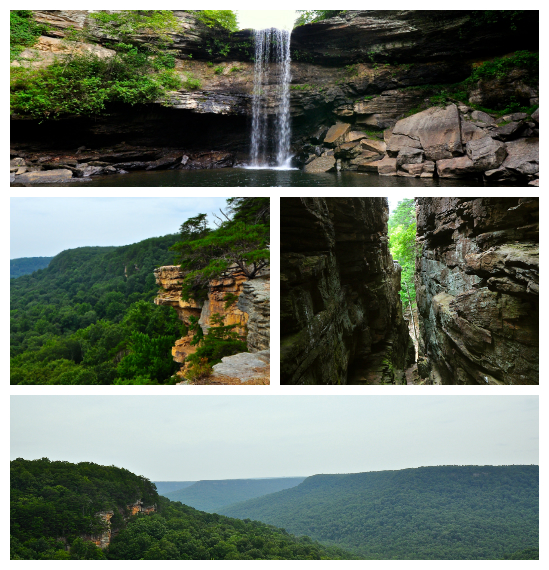
- South Cumberland State Park points of interest. Clockwise: Greeter Falls, the trail down Stone Door, Laurel Gulf Overlook, Stone Door Scenic Overlook.
- Type: Tennessee State Park
- Location: Franklin, Grundy and Marion counties
- Coordinates: 35.259°N 85.789°W
- Area: 12,166 acres (49.23 km^{2})
- Website: South Cumberland State Park

South Cumberland State Park is a state park in the middle and southeast portions of Tennessee on the Cumberland Plateau.

The park was established in 1978. It is a collection of eight discrete tracts scattered across Franklin, Marion and Grundy counties, formerly totaling approximately 30,899 acres (as of 2020). The park now contains 12,166 acres following the separation of Savage Gulf into its own state park. Twelve trailheads provide hiking access to most sections of the park, which protects a series of unique ecosystems on the escarpments and in the ravines of the Southern Cumberland Plateau. There are over a dozen large waterfalls in the park, the tallest of which is Foster Falls, in Marion County. The Grundy Lakes unit includes industrial archaeological remains of the coal mines and coke production facilities of the Tennessee Coal, Iron and Railroad Company, as well as a stockade prison it operated that provided convict labor for those facilities.

The park became too large to manage as a single park so in 2022, the Tennessee Department of Environment and Conservation established Savage Gulf State Park, which removed South Cumberland from Sequatchie County. In 2024 it was announced that the park would be once again be divided into another state park, Head of Crow, reducing the acreage of the park another 4,258 acres (17.23 km^{2}).

== Areas ==
Distinct areas contained within the park include:

- Visitor Center Area
- Fiery Gizzard Trail
- Grundy Forest State Natural Area
- Grundy Lakes
- Denny Cove
- Carter State Natural Area (Lost Cove ["Buggytop"] Cave)
- Foster Falls
- Sewanee Natural Bridge State Natural Area
- Hawkins Cove State Natural Area
- Sherwood Forest

Crossing in and out of the park's various sections, the Fiery Gizzard Trail is renowned for its beauty and diversity.

== Camping ==
The park features one campground that can accommodate cars and small camping trailers Foster Falls. The park also features four backcountry campgrounds: Father Adamz, Grundy Forest, Small Wilds and Little Cove.

== See also ==
- Collins River
