= Gruetli-Laager, Tennessee =

- City
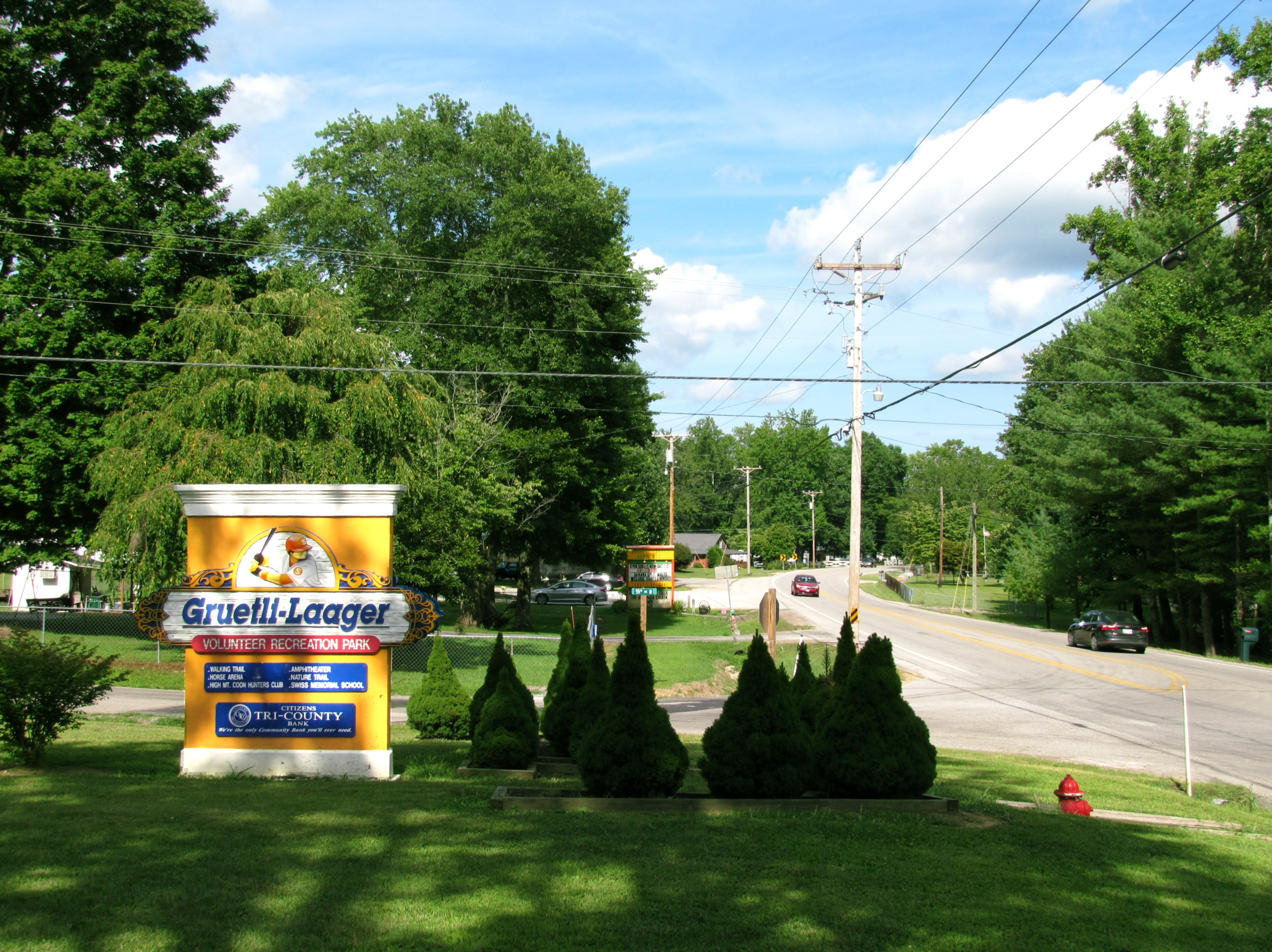
- SR 108 in Gruetli-Laager

- Location of Gruetli-Laager in Grundy County, Tennessee.

- Location within Tennessee Location within the United States
- Coordinates: 35°22′23″N 85°37′25″W
- Country: United States
- State: Tennessee
- County: Grundy
- Settled: 1869
- Incorporated: 1980

Area
  - Total: 12.68 sq mi (32.83 km^{2})
  - Land: 12.68 sq mi (32.83 km^{2})
  - Water: 0 sq mi (0.00 km^{2})
- Elevation: 1,919 ft (585 m)

Population (2020)
  - Total: 1,742
  - Density: 137.4/sq mi (53.06/km^{2})
- Time zone: UTC-6 (Central (CST))
  - Summer (DST): UTC-5 (CDT)
- ZIP code: 37339
- Area code: 931
- FIPS code: 47-31490
- GNIS feature ID: 1648587

Gruetli-Laager (/ˈɡruːtli ˈlɑːɡər/ GROOT-lee LAH-gər) is a city in Grundy County, Tennessee, United States. As of the 2020 census, Gruetli-Laager had a population of 1,742. As its name implies, Gruetli-Laager consists of two communities— Gruetli and Laager— incorporated as a single city.

== History ==
Gruetli was founded by German-speaking Swiss immigrants in 1869. The town was part of a greater initiative— conducted by an organization known as the Tennessee Kolonisation Gesellschaft— to establish Swiss colonies atop the Cumberland Plateau in Tennessee. Gruetli was probably named after a commune in the Swiss canton of Glarus. Peter Staub, a member of Knoxville's thriving Swiss community, helped purchase the initial tract of land for Gruetli. The land was advertised in Switzerland, where the opportunity for a new start appealed to many families struggling with difficult economic conditions in Europe.

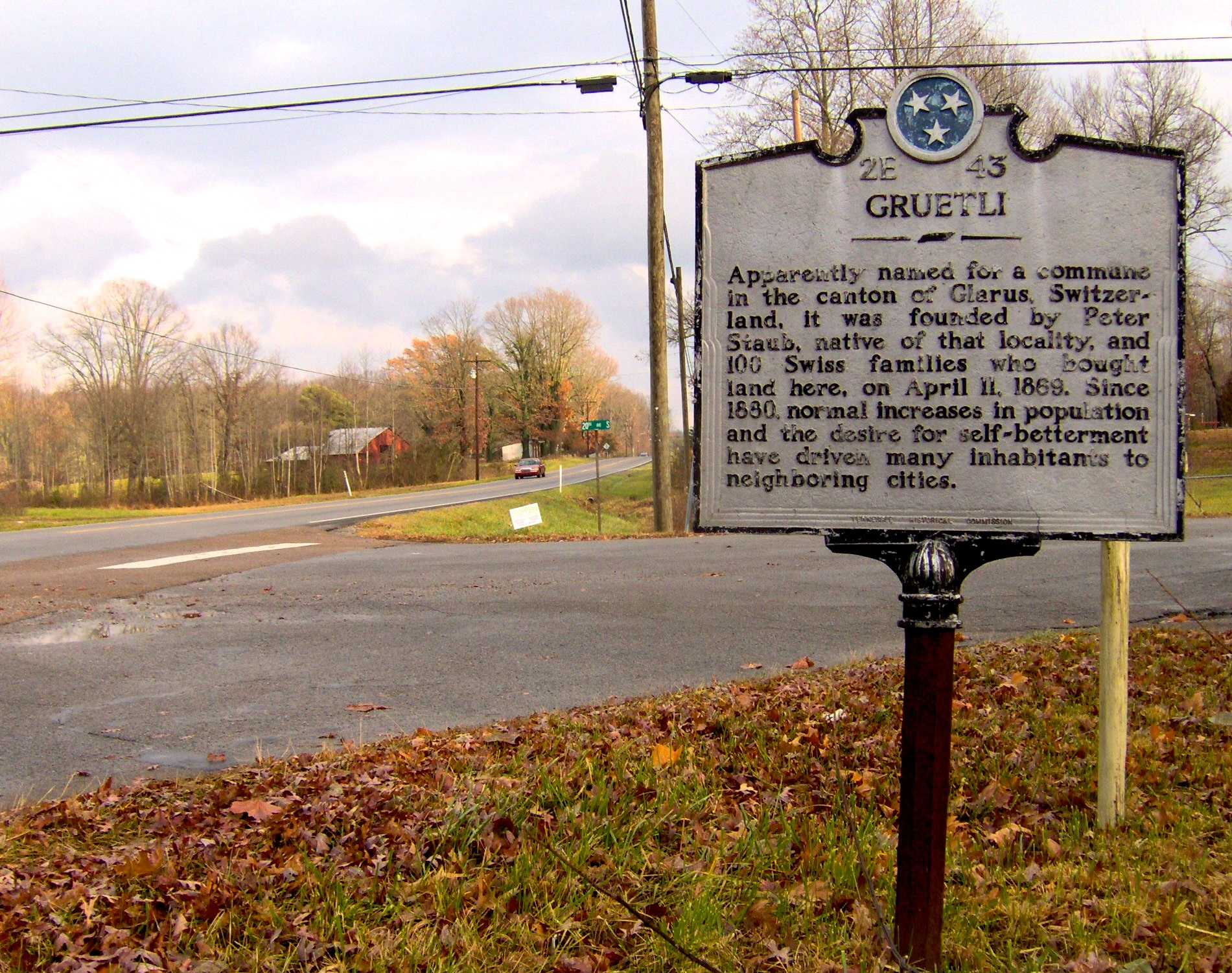
Tennessee Historical Commission marker along State Route 108

Although over 100 Swiss families moved to the Gruetli area in the 1870s, many were disappointed by the land's poor quality and relative isolation, and thus relocated to nearby cities. Nevertheless, by 1880, Grundy County had the largest Swiss population of any county in Tennessee. Prominent early settlers at Gruetli included Christian Marugg, who operated an inn along the stagecoach road between Chattanooga and McMinnville, and Melchior Thoni, Jr. (1849–1926), a woodcarver whose work was displayed in the old Governor's Mansion and the Christ Church in Nashville.

Throughout the early 1900s, railroads were constructed in the hills east of Gruetli to accommodate various coal mining operations in the area. Laager was established as a railroad stopover (initially known as "Henley's Switch") in 1918. Gruetli and Laager merged and incorporated in 1980.

== Geography ==
Gruetli-Laager is located southeast of the center of Grundy County at 35°22′23″N 85°37′25″W (35.373152, -85.623617). The city is situated atop the southern Cumberland Plateau, roughly halfway between the plateau's Sequatchie Valley escarpment to the east and its Highland Rim escarpment to the west. Just north of the city, the Collins River and its upper watershed slice a gorge known as "Savage Gulf" as the river descends the plateau en route to its confluence with the Caney Fork at Rock Island.

Gruetli-Laager stretches for several miles along Tennessee State Route 108 (SR 108). The highway connects the area with the Sequatchie Valley and Chattanooga area to the southeast. Just west of Gruetli-Laager, SR 108 intersects SR 56, which connects the area to Monteagle and Interstate 24 to the southwest and McMinnville to the northwest.

According to the United States Census Bureau, the city has a total area of 12.5 square miles (32.5 km^{2}), all land.

== Demographics ==
Historical population
Census	Pop.	Note	%±
1990	1,810		—
2000	1,867		3.1%
2010	1,813		−2.9%
2020	1,742		−3.9%

=== 2020 census ===
Racial composition as of the 2020 census
Race	Number	Percent
White	1,664	95.5%
Black or African American	1	0.1%
American Indian and Alaska Native	5	0.3%
Asian	7	0.4%
Native Hawaiian and Other Pacific Islander	0	0.0%
Some other race	6	0.3%
Two or more races	59	3.4%
Hispanic or Latino (of any race)	14	0.8%

As of the 2020 census, there were 1,742 people, 678 households, and 562 families residing in Gruetli-Laager. The median age was 42.1 years; 21.5% of residents were under the age of 18 and 18.5% were 65 or older. There were 98.6 males for every 100 females overall and 96.8 males for every 100 females age 18 and over.

There were 678 households in Gruetli-Laager, of which 31.3% had children under the age of 18 living in them. Of all households, 49.0% were married-couple households, 16.4% were households with a male householder and no spouse or partner present, and 27.1% were households with a female householder and no spouse or partner present. About 24.1% of all households were made up of individuals and 11.5% had someone living alone who was 65 years of age or older.

There were 741 housing units, of which 8.5% were vacant. The homeowner vacancy rate was 0.3% and the rental vacancy rate was 0.9%.

0.0% of residents lived in urban areas, while 100.0% lived in rural areas.

=== 2000 census ===
As of the census of 2000, there was a population of 1,867, with 720 households and 540 families residing in the city. The population density was 150.0 inhabitants per square mile (57.9/km^{2}). There were 765 housing units at an average density of 61.4 per square mile (23.7/km^{2}). The racial makeup of the city was 99.25% White, 0.05% Asian, 0.05% from other races, and 0.64% from two or more races. Hispanic or Latino of any race were 0.54% of the population.

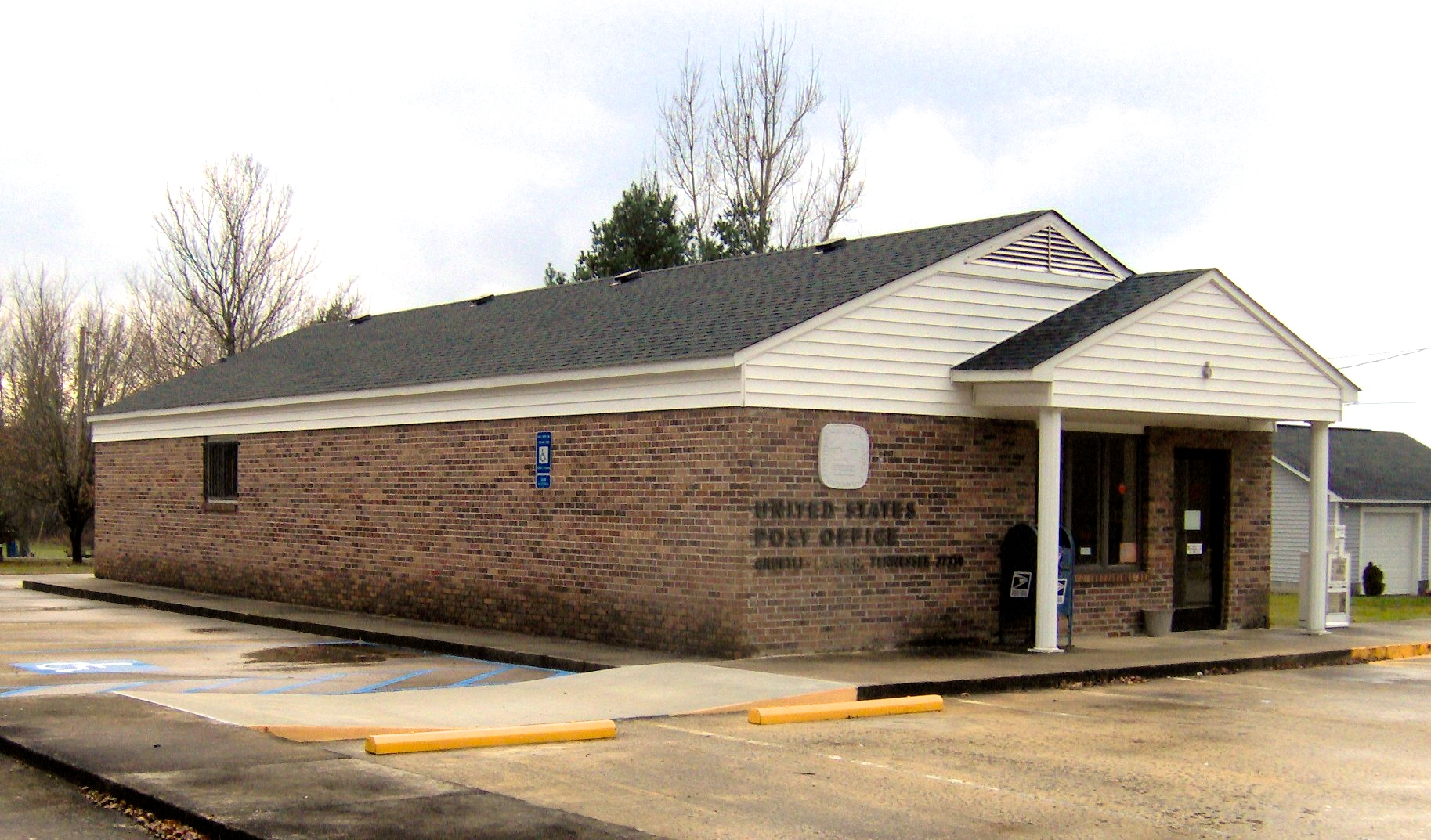
Gruetli-Laager's post office

There were 720 households, out of which 34.6% had children under the age of 18 living with them, 59.2% were married couples living together, 11.9% had a female householder with no husband present, and 25.0% were non-families. 22.9% of all households were made up of individuals, and 11.7% had someone living alone who was 65 years of age or older. The average household size was 2.59 and the average family size was 3.03.

In the city, the population was spread out, with 27.3% under the age of 18, 9.6% from 18 to 24, 28.0% from 25 to 44, 22.4% from 45 to 64, and 12.6% who were 65 years of age or older. The median age was 35 years. For every 100 females, there were 93.3 males. For every 100 females age 18 and over, there were 92.5 males.

The median income for a household in the city was $23,101, and the median income for a family was $27,542. Males had a median income of $26,198 versus $17,634 for females. The per capita income for the city was $11,704. About 21.3% of families and 24.8% of the population were below the poverty line, including 35.5% of those under age 18 and 8.8% of those age 65 or over.
