= Coalmont, Tennessee =

- City
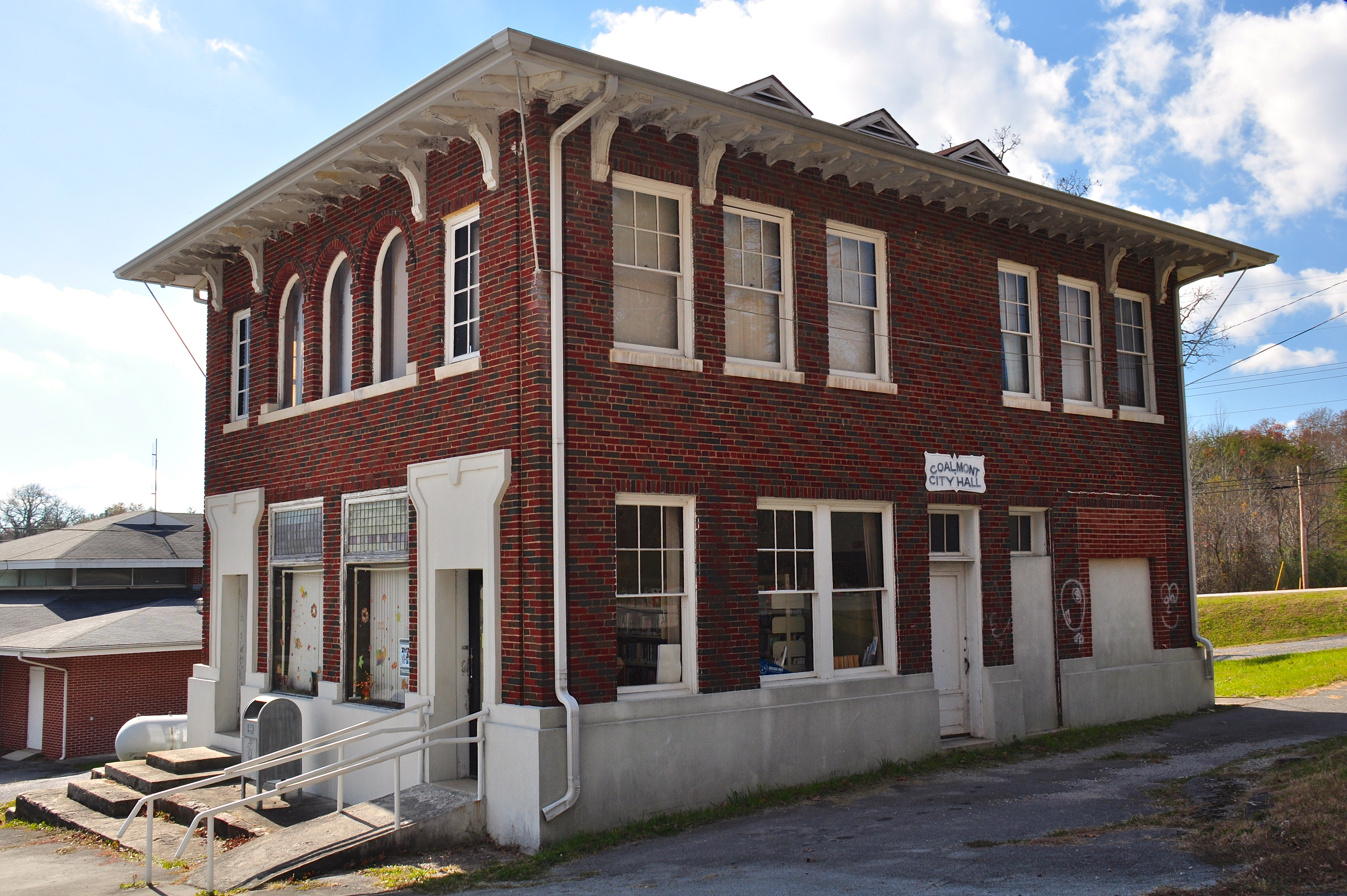
- The historic Coalmont Bank Building serves as the Coalmont City Hall and Public Library.

- Location of Coalmont in Grundy County, Tennessee.
- Coordinates: 35°20′40″N 85°43′2″W
- Country: United States
- State: Tennessee
- County: Grundy

Area
  - Total: 6.19 sq mi (16.04 km^{2})
  - Land: 6.06 sq mi (15.69 km^{2})
  - Water: 0.14 sq mi (0.35 km^{2})
- Elevation: 1,883 ft (574 m)

Population (2020)
  - Total: 784
  - Density: 129.4/sq mi (49.98/km^{2})
- Time zone: UTC-6 (Central (CST))
  - Summer (DST): UTC-5 (CDT)
- ZIP code: 37313
- Area code: 931
- FIPS code: 47-15920
- GNIS feature ID: 1306006

Coalmont is a city in Grundy County, Tennessee, United States. Established in 1904, the city has an area of 6 square miles. As of the 2020 census, Coalmont had a population of 784.

== History ==
Coalmont was established as a coal mining company town around 1904, operated by the Sewanee Coal, Coke and Land Company. Residences, businesses and commercial buildings in Coalmont were built and owned by the company, but individual miners could also build their own homes. A battery of coke ovens dating from the first decade of the 20th century is listed on the National Register of Historic Places. The Coalmont Bank Building also is listed.

== Geography ==
Coalmont is located at 35°20′40″N 85°43′2″W (35.344309, -85.717252).

According to the United States Census Bureau, the city has a total area of 6.1 square miles (16 km^{2}), of which, 5.9 square miles (15 km^{2}) of it is land and 0.1 square miles (0.26 km^{2}) of it (2.14%) is water.

=== Climate ===
Climate data for Coalmont, Tennessee, 1991–2020 normals, extremes 1999–present
Month	Jan	Feb	Mar	Apr	May	Jun	Jul	Aug	Sep	Oct	Nov	Dec	Year
Record high °F (°C)	72 (22)	78 (26)	83 (28)	83 (28)	88 (31)	100 (38)	98 (37)	98 (37)	95 (35)	92 (33)	82 (28)	71 (22)	100 (38)
Mean maximum °F (°C)	63.3 (17.4)	66.4 (19.1)	74.1 (23.4)	79.7 (26.5)	84.3 (29.1)	89.3 (31.8)	90.4 (32.4)	89.9 (32.2)	87.3 (30.7)	82.2 (27.9)	71.5 (21.9)	66.0 (18.9)	92.2 (33.4)
Mean daily maximum °F (°C)	45.3 (7.4)	48.7 (9.3)	57.4 (14.1)	66.4 (19.1)	73.5 (23.1)	80.0 (26.7)	83.2 (28.4)	82.8 (28.2)	78.1 (25.6)	68.3 (20.2)	57.4 (14.1)	48.1 (8.9)	65.8 (18.8)
Daily mean °F (°C)	35.4 (1.9)	38.4 (3.6)	46.0 (7.8)	54.4 (12.4)	62.6 (17.0)	69.8 (21.0)	73.2 (22.9)	72.2 (22.3)	66.6 (19.2)	55.8 (13.2)	45.8 (7.7)	38.4 (3.6)	54.9 (12.7)
Mean daily minimum °F (°C)	25.6 (−3.6)	28.1 (−2.2)	34.5 (1.4)	42.4 (5.8)	51.7 (10.9)	59.7 (15.4)	63.2 (17.3)	61.6 (16.4)	55.1 (12.8)	43.3 (6.3)	34.2 (1.2)	28.7 (−1.8)	44.0 (6.7)
Mean minimum °F (°C)	5.5 (−14.7)	10.1 (−12.2)	18.1 (−7.7)	26.9 (−2.8)	34.4 (1.3)	48.5 (9.2)	53.4 (11.9)	52.3 (11.3)	41.1 (5.1)	27.1 (−2.7)	17.3 (−8.2)	13.0 (−10.6)	3.7 (−15.7)
Record low °F (°C)	−8 (−22)	−4 (−20)	8 (−13)	18 (−8)	24 (−4)	41 (5)	47 (8)	44 (7)	32 (0)	21 (−6)	10 (−12)	5 (−15)	−8 (−22)
Average precipitation inches (mm)	5.76 (146)	5.54 (141)	6.13 (156)	6.15 (156)	5.08 (129)	5.26 (134)	6.09 (155)	4.27 (108)	4.24 (108)	3.45 (88)	4.83 (123)	6.38 (162)	63.18 (1,606)
Average precipitation days (≥ 0.01 in)	12.1	12.4	13.1	11.9	12.7	11.9	13.2	11.5	9.2	9.5	10.1	12.8	140.4
Source 1: NOAA
Source 2: National Weather Service (mean maxima/minima 2006–2020)

== Demographics ==
Historical population
Census	Pop.	Note	%±
1960	458		—
1970	518		13.1%
1980	625		20.7%
1990	813		30.1%
2000	948		16.6%
2010	841		−11.3%
2020	784		−6.8%

=== 2020 census ===
As of the 2020 census, there were 784 people living in 313 households, including 209 families residing in the city.

The median age was 46.7 years. 18.2% of residents were under the age of 18 and 20.3% of residents were 65 years of age or older. For every 100 females there were 88.9 males, and for every 100 females age 18 and over there were 84.7 males age 18 and over.

0.0% of residents lived in urban areas, while 100.0% lived in rural areas.

There were 313 households in Coalmont, of which 28.8% had children under the age of 18 living in them. Of all households, 47.6% were married-couple households, 14.7% were households with a male householder and no spouse or partner present, and 31.3% were households with a female householder and no spouse or partner present. About 21.8% of all households were made up of individuals and 10.5% had someone living alone who was 65 years of age or older.

There were 352 housing units, of which 11.1% were vacant. The homeowner vacancy rate was 0.0% and the rental vacancy rate was 4.1%.

Racial composition as of the 2020 census
Race	Number	Percent
White	755	96.3%
Black or African American	5	0.6%
American Indian and Alaska Native	2	0.3%
Asian	1	0.1%
Native Hawaiian and Other Pacific Islander	0	0.0%
Some other race	1	0.1%
Two or more races	20	2.6%
Hispanic or Latino (of any race)	4	0.5%

=== 2000 census ===
As of the census of 2000, there was a population of 948, with 369 households and 281 families residing in the city. The population density was 159.4 inhabitants per square mile (61.5/km^{2}). There were 404 housing units at an average density of 67.9 per square mile (26.2/km^{2}). The racial makeup of the city was 99.26% White, 0.11% African American, 0.11% Native American, and 0.53% from two or more races. Hispanic or Latino of any race were 0.21% of the population.

There were 369 households, out of which 36.9% had children under the age of 18 living with them, 58.3% were married couples living together, 15.4% had a female householder with no husband present, and 23.6% were non-families. 19.8% of all households were made up of individuals, and 8.4% had someone living alone who was 65 years of age or older. The average household size was 2.57 and the average family size was 2.97.

In the city, the population was spread out, with 25.1% under the age of 18, 10.7% from 18 to 24, 29.4% from 25 to 44, 24.3% from 45 to 64, and 10.5% who were 65 years of age or older. The median age was 35 years. For every 100 females, there were 90.7 males. For every 100 females age 18 and over, there were 92.4 males.

The median income for a household in the city was $21,750, and the median income for a family was $24,583. Males had a median income of $30,966 versus $17,656 for females. The per capita income for the city was $11,842. About 27.3% of families and 27.0% of the population were below the poverty line, including 28.7% of those under age 18 and 19.0% of those age 65 or over.

== Education ==
The Grundy County Schools includes Grundy County High School.
