= National Register of Historic Places listings in Monroe County, Tennessee =

Location of Monroe County in Tennessee

This is a list of the National Register of Historic Places listings in Monroe County, Tennessee.

This is intended to be a complete list of the properties and districts on the National Register of Historic Places in Monroe County, Tennessee, United States. Latitude and longitude coordinates are provided for many National Register properties and districts; these locations may be seen together in a map.

There are currently 22 properties listed on the National Register in the county, including two National Historic Landmarks. There are also two former listings.

Contents: Counties in Tennessee
Anderson – Bedford – Benton – Bledsoe – Blount – Bradley – Campbell – Cannon – Carroll – Carter – Cheatham – Chester – Claiborne – Clay – Cocke – Coffee – Crockett – Cumberland – Davidson – Decatur – DeKalb – Dickson – Dyer – Fayette – Fentress – Franklin – Gibson – Giles – Grainger – Greene – Grundy – Hamblen – Hamilton – Hancock – Hardeman – Hardin – Hawkins – Haywood – Henderson – Henry – Hickman – Houston – Humphreys – Jackson – Jefferson – Johnson – Knox – Lake – Lauderdale – Lawrence – Lewis – Lincoln – Loudon – Macon – Madison – Marion – Marshall – Maury – McMinn – McNairy – Meigs – Monroe – Montgomery – Moore – Morgan – Obion – Overton – Perry – Pickett – Polk – Putnam – Rhea – Roane – Robertson – Rutherford – Scott – Sequatchie – Sevier – Shelby – Smith – Stewart – Sullivan – Sumner – Tipton – Trousdale – Unicoi – Union – Van Buren – Warren – Washington – Wayne – Weakley – White – Williamson – Wilson

This National Park Service list is complete through NPS recent listings posted May 1, 2026.

== Current listings ==
	Name on the Register	Image	Date listed	Location	City or town	Description
1	Akins House		November 3, 2022 (#100008378)	Citico Rd. 35°31′27″N 84°08′03″W	Vonore	
2	Calderwood Dam	Calderwood Dam	August 21, 1989 (#89001069)	Tennessee River at the end of Calderwood Rd. 35°29′32″N 83°58′58″W	Calderwood	Extends into Blount County
3	Chota and Tanasi Cherokee Village Sites	Chota and Tanasi Cherokee Village Sites	August 30, 1973 (#73001813)	Address Restricted	Vonore	Archaeological sites for 18th-century Cherokee villages of Chota and Tanasi; now submerged under Tellico Lake, though both sites memorialized with monuments along the shoreline
4	Citico Site	Citico Site	November 2, 1978 (#78002614)	Address Restricted	Vonore	Archaeological site for 18th-century Cherokee village; now submerged by Tellico Lake
5	Cooke-Kefauver House	Cooke-Kefauver House	October 17, 1988 (#74001921)	Kefauver Lane; 35°30′40″N 84°21′28″W	Madisonville	
6	First Presbyterian Church	First Presbyterian Church	July 25, 2001 (#01000772)	601 Church St. 35°36′09″N 84°27′49″W	Sweetwater	Gothic Revival-style church; congregation founded in 1860, church built in 1887
7	Fort Armistead		December 11, 2023 (#100009828)	Address Restricted	Coker Creek vicinity	
8	Fort Loudoun	Fort Loudoun	October 15, 1966 (#66000729)	U.S. Route 411; 35°35′45″N 84°12′13″W	Vonore	
9	William J. Fowler Mill and House		January 27, 1983 (#83003057)	Sweetwater Rd. 35°38′35″N 84°18′43″W	Eve Mills	
10	Icehouse Bottom Site	Icehouse Bottom Site	October 19, 1978 (#78002615)	Address Restricted	Vonore	Archaic and Woodland period site excavated in the early 1970s; now submerged by Tellico Lake
11	John McCroskey House	John McCroskey House	February 18, 2000 (#00000125)	3224 Sweetwater-Vonore Rd. 35°36′33″N 84°21′15″W	Sweetwater	Built in 1859
12	Mialoquo Site	Mialoquo Site	October 19, 1978 (#78002616)	Address Restricted	Vonore	Archaeological site for 18th-century Cherokee village; now submerged by Tellico Lake
13	Monroe County Courthouse	Monroe County Courthouse	March 30, 1995 (#95000341)	Town Sq. 35°31′11″N 84°21′46″W	Madisonville	
14	Charles Owen House	Charles Owen House	July 15, 1998 (#98000875)	1019 Mayes St. 35°36′31″N 84°27′47″W	Sweetwater	Federal-style house built in the late 1820s
15	James M. Pardue House		March 21, 2025 (#100011553)	403 North Price Street; 35°36′11″N 84°27′59″W	Sweetwater	
16	Scott Mansion		January 21, 1993 (#92001816)	Scott Mansion Rd., about 1¼ miles east of State Route 68; 35°23′13″N 84°17′20″W	Tellico Plains	
17	Smith-Kefauver House		January 16, 2026 (#100012590)	200 Main Street; 35°31′13″N 84°21′52″W	Madisonville	
18	Stickley House	Stickley House	September 10, 1974 (#74001922)	West of the junction of U.S. Route 411 and State Route 68; 35°31′09″N 84°21′58″W	Madisonville	Greek Revival-style house built in 1846, and designed by architect Thomas Blanchard
19	Tellico Blockhouse Site	Tellico Blockhouse Site	August 11, 1975 (#75001771)	2 miles east of Vonore off State Route 72; 35°36′00″N 84°12′11″W	Vonore	Late 18th-century trading outpost; layout marked by posts and stones, with interpretive signs
20	Tennessee Military Institute Residential Historic District	Tennessee Military Institute Residential Historic District	May 7, 2019 (#100003903)	1310, 1311 & 1313 Peachtree St. 35°36′46″N 84°27′54″W	Sweetwater	
21	Tomotley Site	Tomotley Site	October 19, 1978 (#78002617)	Address Restricted	Vonore	Archaeological site for 18th-century Cherokee village; now submerged by Tellico Lake
22	Toqua Site	Toqua Site	November 16, 1978 (#78002618)	Address Restricted	Vonore	Archaeological site for 18th-century Cherokee village; now submerged by Tellico Lake

== Former listings ==
	Name on the Register	Image	Date listed	Date removed	Location	City or town	Description
1	Elisha Johnson Mansion		December 24, 1974 (#74001923)	June 20, 2023	Ballplay Rd. 35°21′30″N 84°16′25″W	Tellico Plains	
2	McGhee Mansion		August 28, 1974 (#74001924)	January 25, 1985	E of Vonore on Fort Loudoun Rd.	Vonore	Also known as Tuskega. Burned down by arsonist November 14, 1984.

== See also ==
- List of National Historic Landmarks in Tennessee
- National Register of Historic Places listings in Tennessee
