= List of National Historic Landmarks in Tennessee =

Following is a list of sites and structures in Tennessee that have been designated National Historic Landmarks. There are 31 National Historic Landmarks located entirely in the state, and one that includes elements in both Tennessee and Mississippi. All National Historic Landmarks are listed on the National Register of Historic Places.

In addition to the National Historic Landmarks, six historic areas in Tennessee that are listed on the National Register are administered by the National Park Service. These are Cumberland Gap National Historical Park (shared with Kentucky and Virginia), established in 1940; the Andrew Johnson National Historic Site, established as a National Monument in 1935 and redesignated a National Historic site in 1963; and four Civil War sites:

- Chickamauga and Chattanooga National Military Park (shared with Georgia), established 1890; the park now includes the Moccasin Bend Archeological District that is separately designated a National Historic Landmark;
- Fort Donelson National Battlefield, established 1928;
- Shiloh National Military Park, established 1894; the Native American mounds in the park are separately designated as a National Historic Landmark; and
- Stones River National Battlefield, established 1927.

== Key ==
	National Historic Landmark
^{†}	National Historic Landmark District
^{#}	National Historic Site, National Historical Park, National Memorial, or National Monument
^{*}	Delisted Landmark

== Current National Historic Landmarks ==
	Landmark name	Image	Date designated	Location	County	Description
1^{†}	Beale Street Historic District	Beale Street Historic District	May 23, 1966 (#66000731)	Memphis; 35°08′22″N 90°03′07″W	Shelby	Birthplace of the blues style of music, Beale Street produced significant developments in African-American music and the music of the United States generally. W.C. Handy was a prominent Beale Street figure from when this was a lively district of saloons and theaters.
2	William Blount Mansion	William Blount Mansion	January 12, 1965 (#66000726)	Knoxville; 35°57′40″N 83°54′55″W	Knox	The home of William Blount from 1792 to his death in 1800. A Continental Congressman of the Congress of the Confederation and the Constitutional Convention where he represented North Carolina, Blount then became governor of the Southwest Territory, led Tennessee to statehood, and later served in the US Senate.
3	Chucalissa Site	Chucalissa Site	April 19, 1994 (#73001830)	Memphis; 35°03′45″N 90°07′44″W	Shelby	This archaeological mound complex dates from the Walls phase (approximately 15th century) of the Mississippian period. Its well-preserved historic materials include architecture, flora, fauna, and human skeletal remains.
4	Delta Queen (River Steamboat)	Delta Queen (River Steamboat)	June 29, 1989 (#70000495)	Chattanooga; 35°03′36″N 85°18′31″W	Hamilton	River steamboat.
5	Fort Armistead	Fort Armistead	December 11, 2023 (#100009828)	Coker Creek vicinity	Monroe	A Trail of Tears internment site, also used during the American Civil War.
6	Fort Loudoun	Fort Loudoun	June 23, 1965 (#66000729)	Vonore; 35°35′45″N 84°12′13″W	Monroe	Built by the British in 1756 during the French and Indian War, Fort Loudoun allied with the Cherokee to protect the British southern marches. The fort was surrendered to the Cherokee in 1760, who had turned hostile and laid siege to the fort.
7	Fort Pillow	Fort Pillow	May 30, 1974 (#73001806)	Henning; 35°38′10″N 89°50′32″W	Lauderdale	The Confederate victory at the Battle of Fort Pillow (April 1864) ended in the killing of 229 Black Union soldiers out of 262 engaged in the battle. This slaughter by the Southern troops under Gen. Nathan Bedford Forrest has been labeled a massacre. "Remember Fort Pillow!" became a battle cry among Black soldiers for the remainder of the Civil War.
8^{†}	Franklin Battlefield	Franklin Battlefield	December 19, 1960 (#66000734)	Franklin; 35°54′13″N 86°51′58″W	Williamson	At the Civil War Battle of Franklin (November 30, 1864), Maj. Gen. John M. Schofield's Union troops repelled repeated assaults by Confederate forces under Gen. John Bell Hood. The devastating losses sustained helped doom Hood's Army of Tennessee.
9	George Peabody College for Teachers	George Peabody College for Teachers	December 21, 1965 (#66000723)	Nashville; 36°08′30″N 86°47′55″W	Davidson	As the University of Nashville, the college was the first institution to receive support from the Peabody Education Fund, which had been founded by George Peabody to rebuild education in the South after the Civil War. The university began operating as a teachers' college in 1875 and formally changed its name in 1909. It moved to its present location in 1914.
10	Graceland	Graceland	March 27, 2006 (#91001585)	Memphis; 35°02′46″N 90°01′23″W	Shelby	Graceland was Elvis Presley's home for 20 years starting in 1957, and is intimately associated with his music and career. Presley profoundly influenced American music and culture in the 20th century, and has been inducted into the Rock and Roll, Gospel, and Country Halls of Fame.
11	The Hermitage	The Hermitage	December 19, 1960 (#66000722)	Nashville; 36°12′54″N 86°36′47″W	Davidson	This plantation was the home of Andrew Jackson from 1804 until his death. He built the Greek Revival mansion house in 1819. Jackson served as President of the United States from 1829 to 1837.
12	Hermitage Hotel	Hermitage Hotel	August 21, 2020 (#100005652)	231 6th Ave., N. 36°09′47″N 86°47′01″W	Davidson	Designated for its role in the women's suffrage movement.
13	Hiram Masonic Lodge No. 7	Hiram Masonic Lodge No. 7	November 7, 1973 (#73001859)	Franklin; 35°55′31″N 86°52′01″W	Williamson	Hiram Masonic Lodge No. 7 is the oldest public building in Franklin, the oldest Masonic Hall in continuous use in Tennessee, and in 1830 was the site of the signing of the Treaty of Franklin, which ordered the removal of the Chickasaw people from their eastern homeland to territory across the Mississippi River. President Andrew Jackson opened the meeting personally.
14	Jubilee Hall, Fisk University	Jubilee Hall, Fisk University	December 2, 1974 (#71000817)	Nashville; 36°10′08″N 86°48′17″W	Davidson	Fisk University was founded in 1865 by the American Missionary Association to provide a liberal arts education for Blacks after the Civil War. Completed in 1876, this Victorian Gothic structure is the oldest building on campus.
15^{†}	Long Island of the Holston	Long Island of the Holston	October 9, 1960 (#66000733)	Kingsport; 36°31′49″N 82°33′39″W	Sullivan	The Long Island was a sacred council and treaty site among the Cherokee. Daniel Boone began from here to clear the Wilderness Road through the Cumberland Gap in 1775. The island has been heavily transformed by industrial development, and NPS staff recommended withdrawal of National Historic Landmark status in 1996 due to loss of historic integrity.
16^{†}	Moccasin Bend Archeological District	Moccasin Bend Archeological District	September 8, 1986 (#86003510)	Chattanooga; 35°02′09″N 85°20′12″W	Hamilton	This archaeological site on the Tennessee River contains a highly diverse set of Native American remains from the Archaic, Woodland, and Mississippian periods. Spanish artifacts from the 16th century illustrate the early contact period in the Southeast. Earthworks from the Civil War Battle of Chattanooga are also preserved.
17	Montgomery Bell Tunnel	Montgomery Bell Tunnel	April 19, 1994 (#94001188)	White Bluff; 36°08′48″N 87°07′20″W	Cheatham	This is the oldest known full-size tunnel in the US. It was built in 1818–1819 by Montgomery Bell to divert water to provide industrial power. Manual drilling was arduous and performed by slaves using tools such as hammers, chisels, and black powder.
18^{†}	Mountain Branch, National Home for Disabled Volunteer Soldiers	Mountain Branch, National Home for Disabled Volunteer Soldiers	June 17, 2011 (#11000560)	Johnson City; 36°18′38″N 82°22′24″W	Washington	Includes Mountain Home National Cemetery and adjacent VA campus
19	Old First Presbyterian Church	Old First Presbyterian Church	April 19, 1993 (#70000608)	Nashville; 36°09′47″N 86°46′47″W	Davidson	Architect William Strickland designed this church in the Egyptian Revival style. Beginning his career as an apprentice to Benjamin Henry Latrobe, Strickland was one of the most prominent architects in the United States at the time of his simultaneous work on the church and the Tennessee State Capitol. Built in 1849, the church has been nicknamed "Karnak on the Cumberland," and was his most in-depth application of the Egyptian style.
20	Pinson Mounds	Pinson Mounds	January 29, 1964 (#66000727)	Pinson; 35°29′52″N 88°40′57″W	Madison	This site, occupied as early as 5000 BC, consists mainly of mounds constructed during the Middle Woodland Period (ca. 500 B.C. – 500 A.D.).Built here are two temple mounds, one effigy mound, and several other earthworks.
21	James K. Polk Home	James K. Polk Home	July 4, 1961 (#66000728)	Columbia; 35°36′54″N 87°02′14″W	Maury	This house, built in 1816 was the home of future President James K. Polk for six years when he was a young man.
22	Rattle and Snap	Rattle and Snap	November 11, 1971 (#71000825)	Columbia; 35°33′40″N 87°09′23″W	Maury	This mansion was built in the Greek Revival style by a relative of President James K. Polk, and sports a distinctive Corinthian portico.
23	Rhea County Courthouse	Rhea County Courthouse	December 8, 1976 (#72001251)	Dayton; 35°29′42″N 85°00′46″W	Rhea	This courthouse was the scene of the Scopes Trial of July 1925, in which teacher John T. Scopes faced charges for including Charles Darwin's theory of evolution in his public school lessons. The trial became a clash of titans between the lawyers William Jennings Bryan for the prosecution and Clarence Darrow for the defense, and epitomizes the tension between fundamentalism and modernism in a wide range of aspects of American society.
24	Ryman Auditorium	Ryman Auditorium	January 3, 2001 (#71000819)	Nashville; 36°09′41″N 86°46′43″W	Davidson	This auditorium was the home of the Grand Ole Opry from for 31 years from 1943 to 1974. The Opry, with its live music shows and radio programs, has deeply influenced the development of country music.
25^{†}	Siege and Battle of Corinth Sites	Siege and Battle of Corinth Sites	May 6, 1991 (#91001050)	Pocahontas; 35°01′51″N 88°47′44″W	Hardeman	Mostly in Alcorn County, Mississippi; sites of several different American Civil War military actions in and around Corinth, Mississippi, including a small portion of the Davis Bridge Battlefield.
26	Shiloh Indian Mounds Site	Shiloh Indian Mounds Site	May 5, 1989 (#79000279)	Hurley; 35°08′29″N 88°19′15″W	Hardin	This is the largest remaining fortified Mississippian ceremonial mound complex in the Tennessee Valley, including 6 Mississippian temple mounds, one Woodland burial mound, a village site, and a palisade foundation.
27	Sun Record Company	Sun Record Company	July 31, 2003 (#03001031)	Memphis; 35°08′21″N 90°02′16″W	Shelby	This musical recording studio was established by Sam Phillips in 1952. It was here that he discovered and/or recorded many of the greatest names in rock and roll, including: B.B. King, Howlin' Wolf, Ike Turner, Rufus Thomas, Elvis Presley, Johnny Cash, Jerry Lee Lewis, Carl Perkins, Charlie Rich, and Roy Orbison. Rock and roll was deeply influenced by Phillips' work, and its advent drove profound changes in American music, society, and race relations.
28	Sycamore Shoals	Sycamore Shoals	July 19, 1964 (#66000721)	Elizabethton; 36°20′33″N 82°15′21″W	Carter	The Treaty of Sycamore Shoals with the Cherokee, signed here in 1775, allowed the United States to acquire 20,000,000 acres (81,000 km^{2}) of Cherokee land and to promote settlement of present day Kentucky. Sycamore Shoals later served as a Revolutionary War staging area for the 1780 march of the Overmountain Men to victory over British loyalists at the Kings Mountain.
29	Tennessee State Capitol	Tennessee State Capitol	November 11, 1971 (#70000894)	Nashville; 36°09′57″N 86°47′03″W	Davidson	This fine example of Greek Revival architecture includes four Ionic porticos and a simple, well-proportioned interior. It was built in 1845–1859 under the direction of the noted architect William Strickland.
30^{†}	Wynnewood	Wynnewood	November 11, 1971 (#71000838)	Castalian Springs; 36°23′39″N 86°18′59″W	Sumner	This was the earliest settlement in Middle Tennessee, and remains today as a group of six log buildings at a sulfur spring. The 1828 main house was a stagecoach inn and residence.
31	X-10 Reactor, Oak Ridge National Laboratory	X-10 Reactor, Oak Ridge National Laboratory	December 21, 1965 (#66000720)	Oak Ridge; 35°55′35″N 84°18′59″W	Roane	As the main atomic research facility in the United States, this nuclear reactor pioneered the production of plutonium and, later, medical radioisotopes. Built in 1943, it was the world's first full-scale reactor.
32^{†}	Alvin Cullom York Farm	Alvin Cullom York Farm	May 11, 1976 (#76001773)	Pall Mall; 36°32′32″N 84°57′37″W	Fentress	At the 1918 Battle of the Argonne Forest during World War I, Sergeant Alvin C. York distinguished himself with a one-man action that killed 25 enemy soldiers, took 132 prisoners, and captured 35 machine guns. York received the Medal of Honor for this feat, and became even more famous for his refusal to capitalize on the award. He lived at this farm from 1922 until his death in 1964.

== Former National Historic Landmarks ==
The following table provides information on two Tennessee properties that were formerly National Historic Landmarks.

	Landmark name	Image	Date of designation	Date of withdrawal	Locality	County	Description
1	Isaac Franklin Plantation		1977	2005	Gallatin; 36.344793°N 86.493195°W	Sumner	Fairvue Plantation was built in 1832 by Isaac Franklin. Franklin retired to be a planter after a successful career as a partner in the largest slave-trading firm in the South prior to the Civil War. Loss of historic integrity due to physical alterations and construction of a golf course community around the home led to the withdrawal of National Historic Landmark designation.
2	Nashville Union Station and Trainshed	Photograph of the front of Nashville Union Station in 2006, five years after demolition of the trainshed.	1975	2003	Nashville; 36.1572°N 86.7848°W	Davidson	The station and trainshed were built in the 1890s by the Louisville and Nashville Railroad as a major transfer station for routing passengers to the Midwest and West. The trainshed was the longest single-span, gable roof structure constructed in the United States. The trainshed was demolished in 2001 due to dangerous structural deterioration, leading to withdrawal of National Historic Landmark designation.

== See also ==
- List of National Park Service areas in Tennessee
- List of National Historic Landmarks by state
- National Register of Historic Places listings in Tennessee
- List of National Natural Landmarks in Tennessee
