= Jerome Felton =

American football player (born 1986)

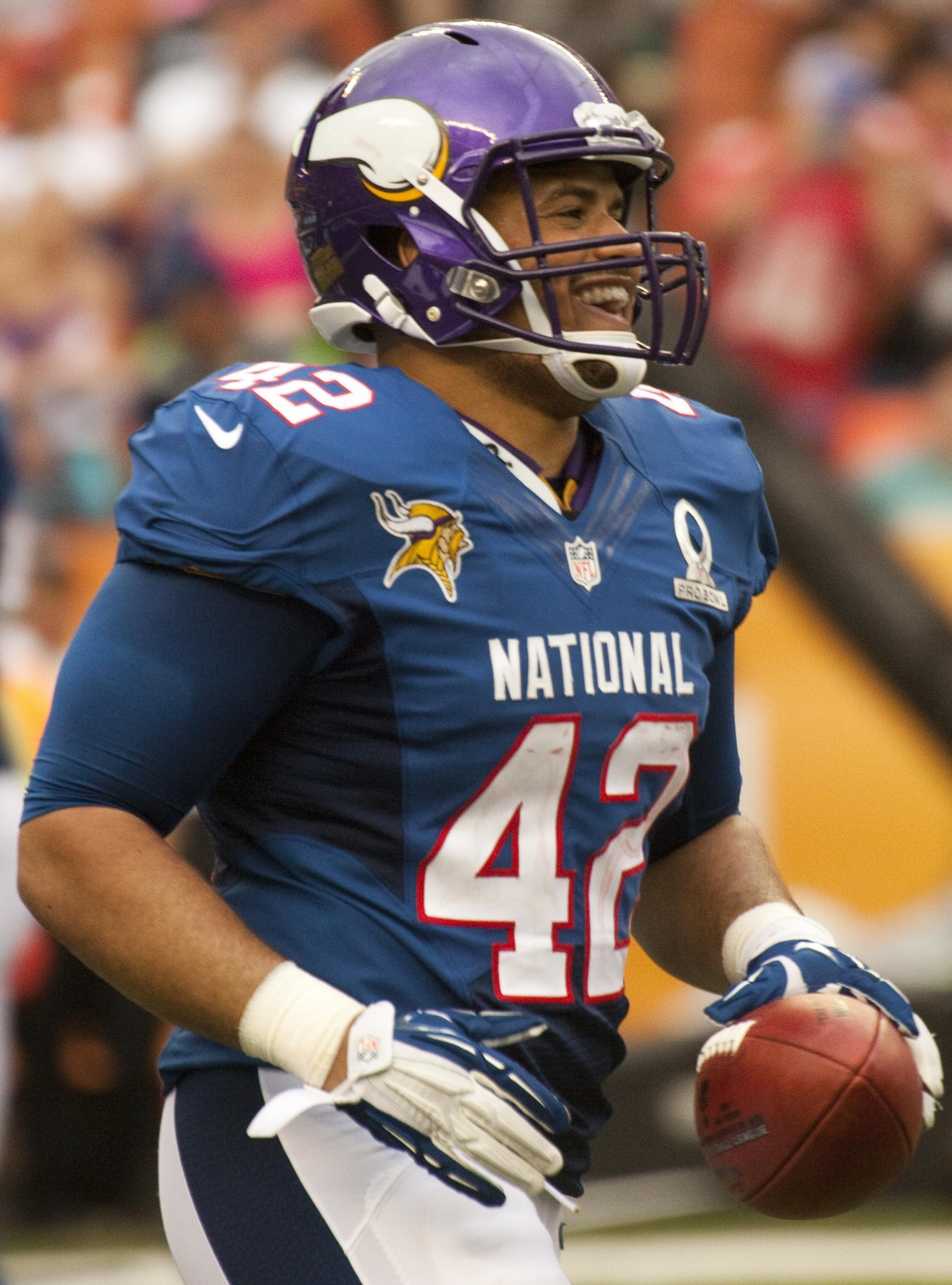
- Felton at the 2012 Pro Bowl

No. 45, 42
- Position: Fullback

Personal information
- Born: July 3, 1986 (age 40); Düren, West Germany (Note: Currently Germany)
- Listed height: 6 ft 0 in (1.83 m)
- Listed weight: 248 lb (112 kg)

Career information
- High school: Sequoyah (Madisonville, Tennessee, U.S.)
- College: Furman (2004–2007)
- NFL draft: 2008: 5th round, 146th overall pick

Career history
- Detroit Lions (2008–2010); Carolina Panthers (2011); Indianapolis Colts (2011); Minnesota Vikings (2012–2014); Buffalo Bills (2015–2016)

Awards and highlights
- Second-team All-Pro (2012); Pro Bowl (2012); 2× First-team All-SoCon (2006, 2007); Second-team All-SoCon (2005)

Career NFL statistics
- Rushing yards: 178
- Rushing average: 3.2
- Receptions: 50
- Receiving yards: 421
- Total touchdowns: 1
- Stats at Pro Football Reference

Jerome Jean-Marie Felton (born July 3, 1986) is an American former professional football player who was a fullback in the National Football League (NFL). He played college football for the Furman Paladins, and was selected by the Detroit Lions in the fifth round of the 2008 NFL draft. He also played for the Carolina Panthers, Indianapolis Colts, Minnesota Vikings, and Buffalo Bills. With the Vikings, he was a fundamental part of Adrian Peterson's success, including Peterson's 2,097 rushing yards season in 2012.

== Early life ==
Felton was born in Düren, Germany. His mother is from Germany and his father was in the U.S. military. Felton's family moved to the United States when he was one.

Felton is a 2004 graduate of Sequoyah High School, Madisonville, Tennessee, where he was a two-way starter at fullback and middle linebacker. He rushed for over 3,000 yards and compiled over 300 tackles in his three-year career. He was a three-time team offensive MVP, All-County, and All-Region selection, served as team captain, rushed for 1,300 yards, and finished second on his team with 104 tackles in 2003.

== College career ==
Felton attended and played college football at Furman. Felton was all-conference as a senior, in 2007, and closed out his career as Furman's all-time record holder in scoring with 414 points. In 2006, he was named first-team All-SoCon and helped lead Furman to an 8–4 record, earn a playoff berth, and finish ranked No. 12 in The Sports Network national poll. In 2005, he helped Paladins to an 11–3 record, NCAA I-AA semifinal playoff finish, and No. 3 final national ranking. He led in rushing with 940 yards and scored a team leading 20 touchdowns and set a school single season scoring record with 124 points. In 2004, he began the season in a reserve role but by midseason took over the starting fullback job, beating out a pair of seniors in the process.

== Professional career ==
Pre-draft measurables
Height	Weight	40-yard dash	10-yard split	20-yard split	20-yard shuttle	Three-cone drill	Vertical jump	Broad jump	Bench press	Wonderlic
6 ft 0 in (1.83 m)	241 lb (109 kg)	4.68 s	1.56 s	2.64 s	4.46 s	7.20 s	32 1/2 in (0.83 m)	9 ft 2 in (2.79 m)	30 reps	28
All values from NFL Combine

=== Detroit Lions ===
Felton was drafted by the Lions in the fifth round of the 2008 NFL draft with the 146th overall pick. He became the Lions starting fullback as a rookie, playing in 13 games, starting six and catching nine passes. In the 2009 season, he started in eight games and appeared in 13. He totaled 15 carries for 46 rushing yards and 13 receptions for 133 receiving yards. In the 2010 season, he appeared in all 16 games and started two. On August 30, 2011, he was waived by the team.

=== Carolina Panthers ===
Felton was claimed off waivers by the Carolina Panthers on September 1, 2011. After the Panthers waived Tony Fiammetta, Felton was named starting fullback of the Panthers, just three days after being claimed off waivers. Felton was waived by the Panthers on November 25.

=== Indianapolis Colts ===
Felton was claimed off waivers by the Indianapolis Colts on November 28, 2011. In the 2011 season, he appeared in nine games and started one with Carolina and appeared in five and started two for Indianapolis.

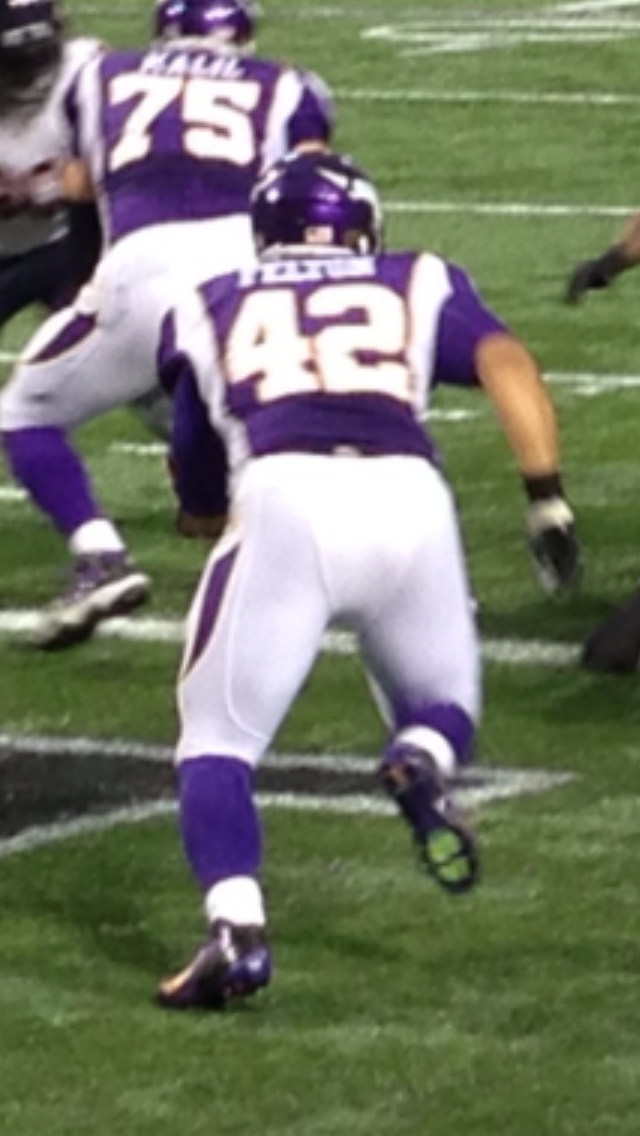
Felton in 2012

=== Minnesota Vikings ===
On March 20, 2012, Felton was signed as a free agent by the Minnesota Vikings. On December 26, 2012, Felton was selected to his first NFL Pro Bowl. Felton appeared in all 16 games and started seven in the 2012 season.

On March 12, 2013, Felton was re-signed by the Vikings with a three-year, $7.5 million contract. On August 14, 2013, Felton underwent an appendectomy. On August 26, 2013, Felton was suspended for three games for violating the NFL's substance-abuse policy. Felton appeared in 13 games and started nine in the 2013 season.

In the 2014 season, Felton appeared in 16 games and started three. In Week 14, against the New York Jets, he scored a touchdown on an offensive fumble recovery in the 30–24 overtime victory.

=== Buffalo Bills ===
On March 11, 2015, Felton signed with the Buffalo Bills. Felton started in eight games and appeared in all 16 games in the 2015 season.

Felton was released on September 2, 2016, as part of final preseason roster cuts. On September 12, 2016, he re-signed with the Bills. He started in four games and appeared in 15 in the 2016 season.

On December 15, 2017, Felton announced his retirement from the NFL.

=== NFL statistics ===
Year	Team	Games	Car	Yds	YPC	FD
2008	DET	13	2	4	2.0	0
2009	DET	13	15	46	3.1	7
2010	DET	16	22	76	3.5	3
2011	CAR	9	3	10	3.3	3
2014	MIN	16	4	27	6.8	4
2015	BUF	16	1	2	2.0	1
2016	BUF	15	8	13	1.6	5
Career		132	55	178	3.2	21
