= Ted McNair =

American athlete and missionary (1858–1915)

Princeton Tigers
- Position: Halfback
- Class: 1879

Personal information
- Born: February 24, 1858; Dansville, New York, U.S.
- Died: November 21, 1915 (aged 57); Tokyo, Japan

Career information
- College: Princeton (1877–1879)

Awards and highlights
- National championship (1877, 1878)

Theodore Monroe McNair (February 24, 1858 – November 21, 1915) was a Presbyterian missionary and a college football and baseball player for the Princeton Tigers as a halfback and center fielder in the 19th century. He played at the halfback position. He was one of the stars of football's early years of collegiate play.

McNair sent a photograph of an early Princeton baseball team playing Yale for a history book on the school's athletics program. He visited Japan as a missionary. He joined the faculty of Meiji Gakuin University.

He was Scots-Irish and his ancestor came to America in 1738.
