= First Presbyterian Church (Sweetwater, Tennessee) =

Historic church in Tennessee, United States

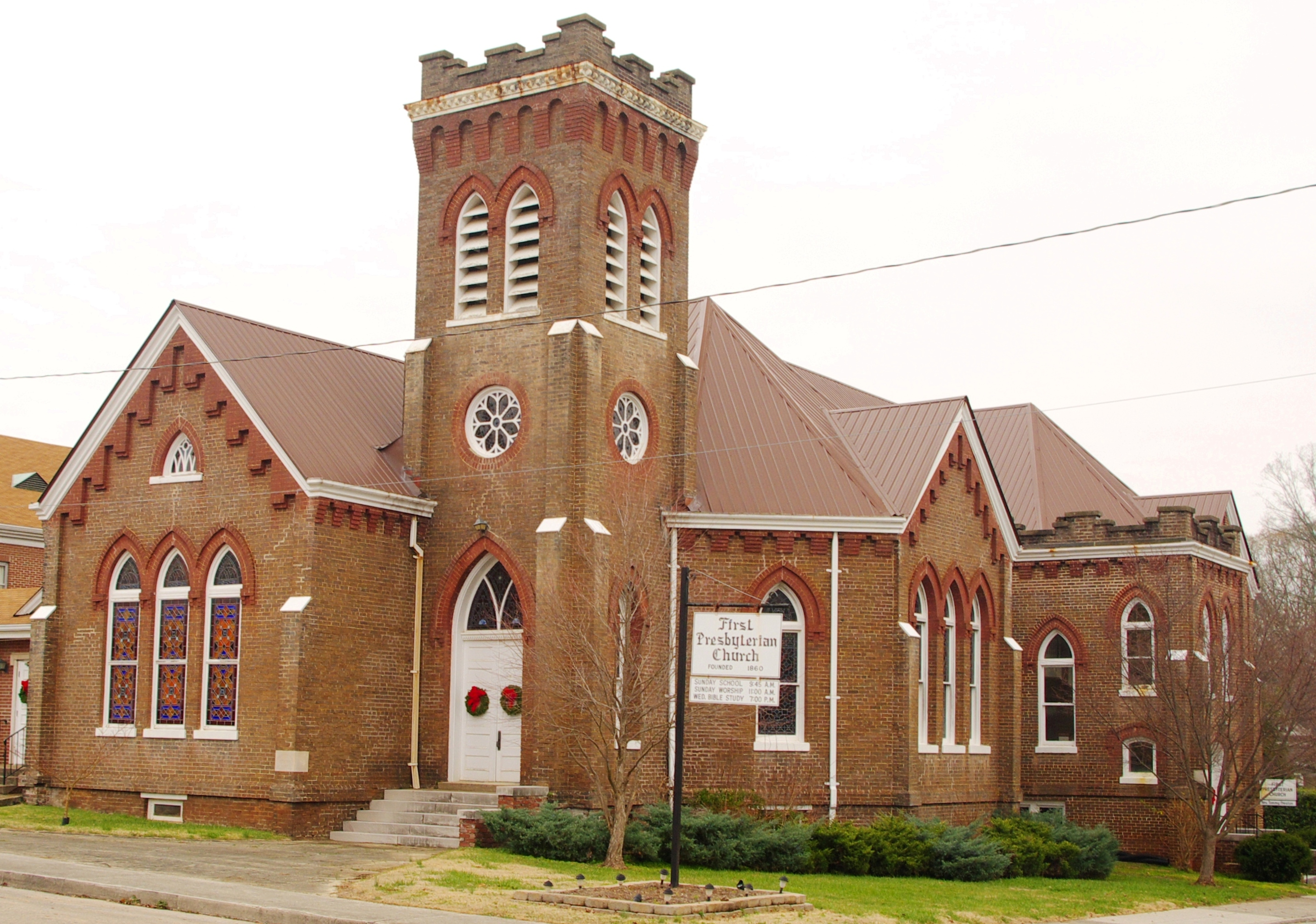

- Location within Tennessee Location within the United States
- 35°36′9″N 84°27′49″W
- Address: 601 Church St, Sweetwater, Tennessee
- Country: United States
- Denomination: Presbyterian
- Website: www.sweetpres.com

History
- Former name: Old School Presbyterian Church of Sweetwater
- Status: Active
- Founded: May 4, 1860

Architecture
- Architect: Bowman
- Architectural type: Gothic Revival
- Years built: 1887-1888
- Groundbreaking: July 1887
- Completed: June 2, 1888
- Construction cost: $6,167.85

Specifications
- Materials: Brick

Clergy
- Pastor: Bradley Parish
- First Presbyterian Church
- U.S. National Register of Historic Places
- Area: less than one acre
- NRHP reference No.: 01000772
- Added to NRHP: July 25, 2001

First Presbyterian Church is a historic church at 601 Church Street in Sweetwater, Tennessee, affiliated with the Presbyterian Church (USA). The congregation was formed in 1860, and the current church building was completed in 1888. The church was added to the National Register of Historic Places in 2001 for its historical role and as an example of Gothic Revival architecture.

== History ==
=== Old School Presbyterian Church of Sweetwater (1860–1866) ===
In April 1860, 17 residents of Sweetwater petitioned the Presbytery of Knoxville to organize a church, and on May 4, 1860, the Old School Presbyterian Church of Sweetwater was founded. However, the church was forced to suspend operations after several years due to the American Civil War, and there are no church records from the period between November 4, 1862, and October 6, 1866.

After the Civil War, the Old School Presbyterian Church of Sweetwater merged with the older New School Church to form the First Presbyterian Church.

=== The New School Church (1848–1866) ===
Organized on June 4, 1848, the New School Church was founded with the help of Thomas Brown, a minister of Bethel Presbyterian Church in Kingston, Tennessee. Born in Virginia and trained as a blacksmith, Brown attended Maryville College before becoming ordained and preaching throughout the region.

The New School Church building was constructed from 1857 to late 1858 or early 1859 and was located on the corner of Walnut Street and Heiskell Street. The building remained in use for Sunday School classes until 1872.

=== Reorganization and Construction of the Current Building (1866–1888) ===
As a result of the Old School–New School controversy within the Presbyterian Church, two Presbyterian churches served the Sweetwater community starting in the year 1860. The New School movement supported revivals, while the Old School was more conservative and placed more emphasis on seminary education for ministers. On October 5, 1866, the two Presbyterian churches in Sweetwater—The Old School Presbyterian Church of Sweetwater and The New School Church—merged, with 29 members for the merger and 1 against.

By 1887, church membership had increased to 93, and funds were raised for a new building. The current structure was completed on June 2, 1888; a brick sanctuary with stained glass windows and bell tower with a pitched roof. The pitched bell tower roof has since been removed.

=== Later Additions ===
In 1917, a two-story addition was built behind the sanctuary with overflow seating and classrooms based on the Akron Plan. An additional classroom building was constructed in 1968.

On April 5, 1976, a day care center was established in the church educational building. As of 2025, the First Presbyterian Preschool enrolls around 40 children from the Sweetwater area.

The sanctuary was remodeled and rededicated in 2024.
