= Monroe County Schools (Tennessee) =

School district in Monroe County, Tennessee, United States

Monroe County Schools is a school district in Tennessee, serving Monroe County. Its headquarters are in Madisonville.

Residents of Sweetwater are served by Sweetwater City Schools for elementary through junior high school.

In 2018 the district had 5,262 students in its schools. 42.2% of students are classified as economically disadvantaged and receive free or reduced lunch. The district's minority enrollment is 10%. White students account for 88.7% of enrollment, 6.7% Hispanic/Latino, 2.7% two or more races, 1.2% Black or African American, 0.5% Asian or Asian Pacific Islander, 0.2% American Indian or Alaska Native, and 0.1% Native Hawaiian. 1.3% of students are English Language Learners.

Monroe County spends $9,221 per student each year. It has an annual revenue of $49,007,000. Overall, the district spends $5,564.8 million on instruction, $3,137.7 million on support services, and $527.1 million on other expenses. The district receives funding from the following sources: 62.4% State, 26.7% Local, 10.9% Federal.

Based on data from the 2017 - 2018 and 2018 - 2019 school years, 32% of elementary students tested at or above the proficient level for reading, and 29% tested at or above that level for math. Also, 32% of middle school students tested at or above the proficient level for reading, and 27% tested at or above that level for math. And 31% of high school students tested at or above the proficient level for reading, and 29% tested at or above that level for math.

== Schools ==
=== High schools ===
Zoned:

- Sequoyah High School (Madisonville)
- Sweetwater High School Sweetwater
- Tellico Plains High School (Tellico Plains, Tennessee|Tellico Plains)

=== Middle schools ===
- Madisonville Middle School(Madisonville)
- Tellico Plains Junior High School (Tellico Plains)
- Vonore Middle School (Vonore)

=== Elementary schools ===
- Coker Creek Elementary School (Coker Creek unincorporated area, near Tellico Plains)
- Madisonville Primary School (Madisonville)
- Madisonville Intermediate School (Madisonville)
- Rural Vale Elementary School (Unincorporated area, near Tellico Plains)
- Tellico Plains Elementary School (Tellico Plains)
- Vonore Elementary School (Vonore)

== District Level Departments ==
- Career & Technical Education (CTE)
- Exceptional Education
- Food & Nutrition
- Response to Intervention
- Technology
- Family Resource Center
- Maintenance
- School Health
- Transportation
- Federal Programs
- Pre-Kindergarten
