= Tennessee Military Institute =

Former military academy

Tennessee Military Institute (TMI) was a military academy in Sweetwater, Tennessee.

== Sweetwater Military College ==
The school was founded as Sweetwater Military College in 1874 by J. Lynn Bachman, a Presbyterian minister, with the avowed purpose of providing a place "where young men could have good educational advantages under safe and wholesome influences." The campus was originally located in a small building, which no longer exists, on College Street in Sweetwater. Bachman remained president until 1902, when he was replaced by Col. O. C. Hulvey. Hulvey's former residence is now owned by a private individual and houses a small TMI museum.

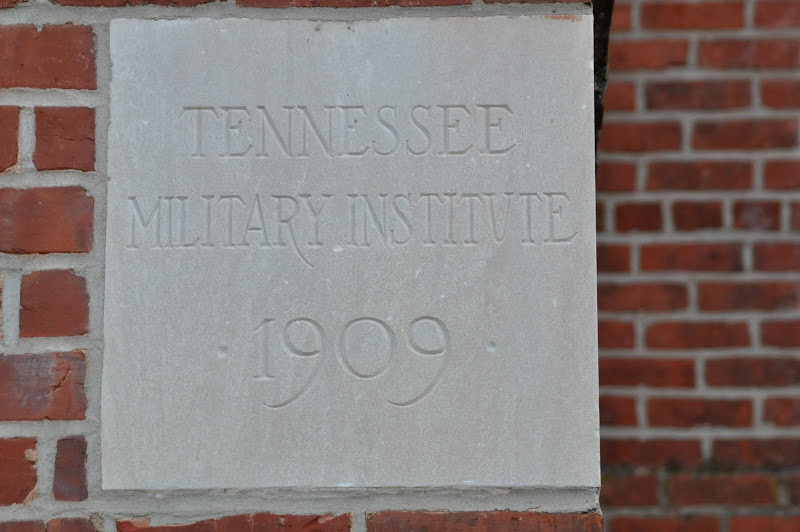
The cornerstone of the main building at Tennessee Military Institute

== Tennessee Military Institute ==
The name of the school was changed to Tennessee Military Institute in 1909. It was known by this name for most of its life. Due to the "TMI" acronym, it was often jokingly referred to as "Ten Million Idiots" by locals and students alike. 1909 was also when the school moved to its final campus, which eventually consisted of thirteen buildings mostly contained in a single quadrangle surrounding a courtyard, and which was located on 144 acres (58 ha) on U.S. Route 11. U.S. Army officers began directing military instruction in 1911. ROTC began in 1918 after World War I, as Hulvey's tenure as president ended.

Col. C.R. Endsley was TMI's longest serving president, from 1918 to 1956. He was succeeded by his son and namesake, Col. C.R. Endsley Jr. Endsley Jr. was one of the school's longest-serving administrators, serving as commandant from 1934 to 1956, as president from 1956 to 1971, and as head of the chemistry and physics department from 1971 to 1981. Thomas C. Dula succeeded Endsley Jr. as president, serving until the school went coed in 1973, when Sanford Gray became president, a role he filled until the school's closing. Col. C.W. Price was another of the school's longest-serving administrators, serving as vice-president from 1920 to 1966. David N. McQuiddy was another, who served TMI from 1937 to 1981 as Latin and English headmaster, admissions director, director of testing, and special advisor to the guidance department. TMI's sports teams were called the Eagles, and their colors were orange and blue.

== TMI Academy ==
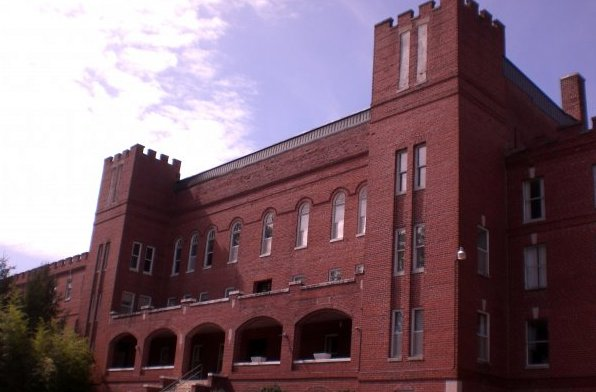
The main building, built in 1909, as it appeared in 2009

In 1975, the school ceased being a military academy, becoming a traditional secondary school/college preparatory school, though still a boarding school. To reflect this, the name of the school was changed to TMI Academy. Curriculum started as early as fifth grade some years, continuing through twelfth grade. Some years a "post-graduate" curriculum was also offered. Due to financial problems, TMI finally closed for good in 1988 after 114 years of continuous operation. This was in spite of financial backing from actor Burt Reynolds, whose nephew attended the school.

== Tennessee Meiji Gakuin High School ==
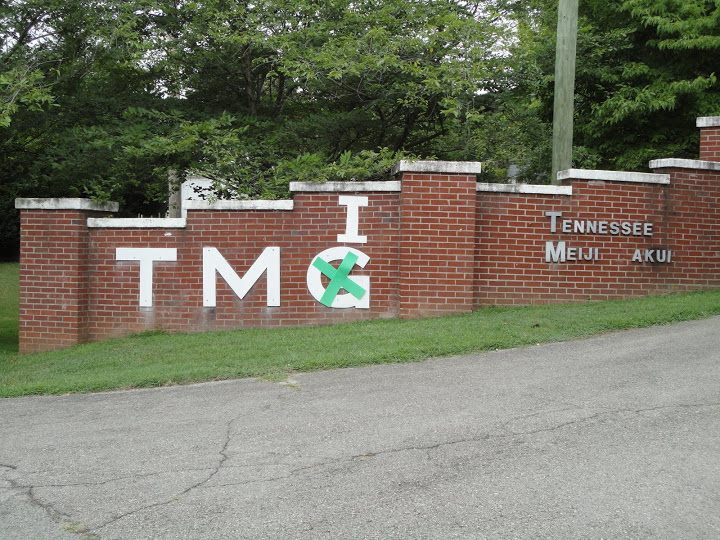
The iconic sign at the entrance to Tennessee Military Institute as it looked in 2010. It was changed to read "TMG" while Tennessee Meiji Gakuin operated on the campus. Here, it was temporarily changed back to "TMI" by alumni holding a reunion at the school.

The campus was acquired by Tennessee Meiji Gakuin High School (テネシー明治学院高等部, Teneshī Meiji Gakuin Kōtōbu, TMG) and opened as such in 1989. The purpose of the school was to provide a Japanese-style education for the children of Japanese persons temporarily living in the United States. Due to declining enrollment, in large part caused by the September 11 attacks, TMG closed in 2007.

== Later years ==
In 2011, the campus was given as a gift to a group called the Sweet Water [sic] Sustainability Institute. The validity of this transaction was later successfully challenged in court, and ownership of the property was transferred to Enota Institute Inc.

The campus has been vacant since 2007, and the buildings have fallen into disrepair. In 2015, the campus was included on the annual "Endangered Heritage" list of the East Tennessee Preservation Alliance as an endangered historic building and/or place. Not surprisingly based on its age, the abandoned campus has drawn the attention of devotees of the supernatural.

In April 2017, Paul Gaffney, formerly of the Harlem Globetrotters, announced plans to acquire the campus and open the Gaffney Athletics Prep Academy. According to Gaffney, it would be the first charter high school to combine an emphasis on athletics with science, technology, engineering, and math, with projected enrollment of 600 students. However, these plans quickly fell through.

== Notable alumni ==
- Butch Baker, country music singer (he performed at the TMG grand opening)
- Jay Baker (Butch's younger brother), actor and television host
- North Callahan, journalist, historian, and scholar
- A.R. Casavant, marching band director and originator of precision drill, who credited his training at TMI for first introducing him to military drill movement
- James Emmert, Indiana attorney general and justice of the Indiana Supreme Court
- Dale Jones, American football coach
- Weston Ochse, internationally award-winning author
