= John McCroskey House =

Historic house in Tennessee, United States

- U.S. National Register of Historic Places
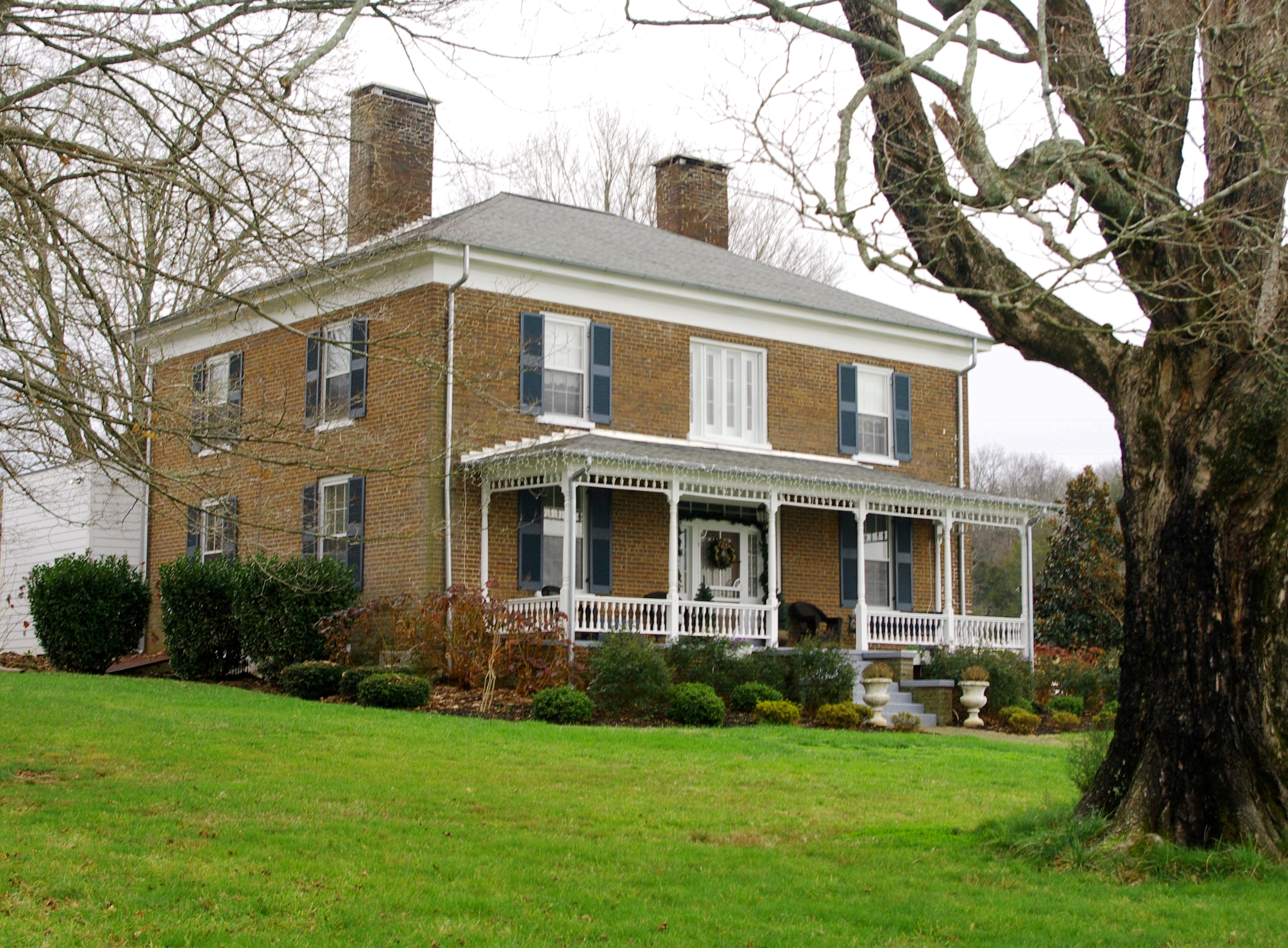

- Location within Tennessee
- Location: Sweetwater, Tennessee
- Coordinates: 35.609167°N 84.354167°W
- Architectural style: Greek Revival
- NRHP reference No.: 00000125
- Added to NRHP: February 18, 2000

The John McCroskey House is located at 3224 Sweetwater-Vonore Road in Sweetwater, Tennessee, United States. It was added to the National Register of Historic Places on February 18, 2000.
