= Tennessee Meiji Gakuin High School =

- テネシー明治学院高等部
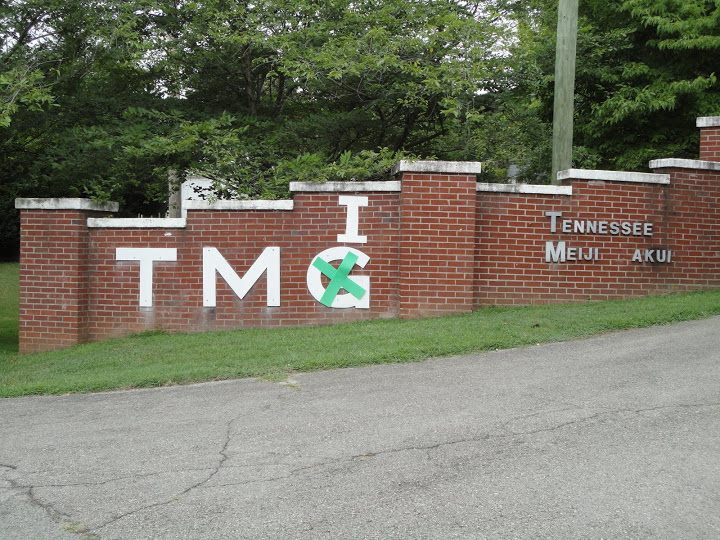
- The entrance sign of Tennessee Meiji Gakuin. Here, it was temporarily changed back to "TMI" by alumni holding a reunion at the school.

Location
- 1314 Peachtree Street, Sweetwater, Tennessee 37874 U.S.A. Sweetwater, Tennessee; United States; 35.613041°N 84.46571289999997°W

Information
- Type: High school
- Established: May 11, 1989
- Closed: 2007
- Grades: 10–12
- Colors: Royal Blue and White
- Website: tmghs.net

Tennessee Meiji Gakuin High School (テネシー明治学院高等部, Teneshī Meiji Gakuin Kōtōbu; TMG) (1989–2007) was a Japanese education system boarding high school located in Sweetwater, Tennessee. The school, a part of Meiji Gakuin (学校法人明治学院) and affiliated with the Japanese Presbyterian institution Meiji Gakuin University, was the first accredited Japanese educational system high school in the United States. The school served grades 10 through 12. This school was an overseas branch of a Japanese private school, or a Shiritsu zaigai kyōiku shisetsu (私立在外教育施設), and it occupied the former Tennessee Military Institute (TMI).

== History ==
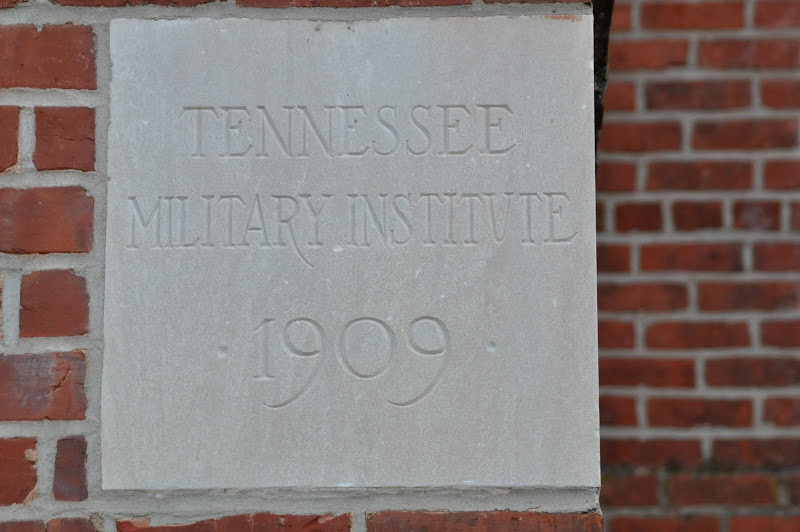
The cornerstone of the Tennessee Military Institute main building, later used by Tennessee Meiji Gakuin

Meiji Gakuin University purchased what would become the university campus in the northern hemisphere summer of 1988 for $2.4 million ($6.53 million when adjusted for inflation), and it spent $2 million ($6.53 million when adjusted for inflation) to renovate the campus. The school opened to the public on May 11, 1989. The Meiji Gakuin Foundation established the school to allow Japanese students residing in America to receive a Japanese-style education, so they could easily enter Japanese universities upon returning to Japan. The school's opening was originally scheduled for April 20 of that year. The opening was delayed due to the processing of paperwork from teachers and the students who resided in Japan by the Immigration and Naturalization Service (INS). The school used 14 of the buildings.

In 1989 Mayor of Sweetwater George Cansler said that the community had a positive reception to the school since it would lead to economic development and because the residents could use the school's recreational facilities for a fee. The week before the school's opening, it held an open house which 200 people attended. The open house included a Japanese tea ceremony and country music, reflecting the cultures of Japan and Tennessee.

A cross-burning incident occurred on the evening of Tuesday May 23, 1989, when a 6.5-foot (2.0 m) wooden cross was placed at the school's entrance and set on fire. Cross burnings are a method of intimidation against racial minorities used by white supremacist groups. After the incident, Jim Burris, the police commissioner of Sweetwater, and Mike Jenkins, the police chief of Sweetwater, made a public apology for the actions of the party that committed the act. The students did not originally understand what the cross burning signified since they were unaware of the significance behind American cross burnings.

Bob Fuller, a former dormitory parent, said that the September 11 attacks, the resulting fears of terrorism, and the decline of the Japanese economy harmed the school. Tennessee Meiji Gakuin was scheduled to close on March 31, 2007.

From around 2012 to January 2014 a lawsuit between two parties over the ownership of the TMI/TMG campus had been ongoing.

== Campus ==
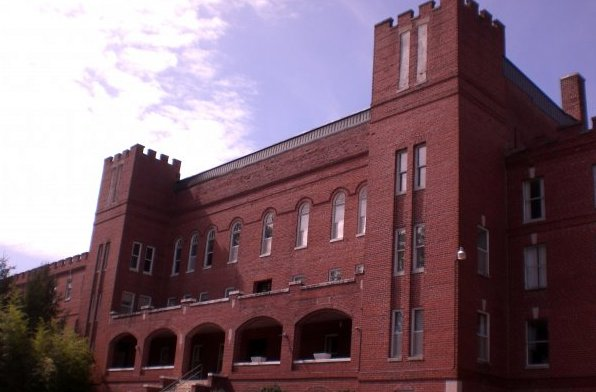
The main building, built in 1909, as it appeared in 2009.

The school was located in Sweetwater, Tennessee, in the foothills of the Great Smoky Mountains. The campus is 40 miles (64 km) from Knoxville.

The school occupied a 144-acre (58 ha) campus which included 14 buildings. It was the former Tennessee Military Institute. The campus site is located 40 miles (64 km) south of Knoxville. When the school acquired the campus, it renovated the 13 buildings that were then on the site. The school was located in Sweetwater because the area had low operating costs and because it was in proximity to offices of several large Japanese companies. In 1991 the New Boys' Dormitory was completed and the Teachers Room/Library Building was completed. In 1995 the New Girls' Dormitory was completed.

The school held its judo classes in the old gymnasium.

All girl students were in a single dormitory, while boy students were divided by grade level: 10th grade (freshmen) in the South Dorm, 11th grade (juniors) in the North Dorm, and 12th grade (seniors) in the New Boys' Dorm.

After the school's closure, the campus was offered for sale. Before 2010 the Sweet Water [sic] Sustainability Institute created a bid to buy the campus from the owners. In the meantime Aeroflex USA submitted a $500,000 bid to buy the campus. Tricia Baehr, the secretary of the institute, said "Personally, I feel the Japanese wanted the buildings to be preserved. They didn't want the land broken up or turned into a subdivision." In 2011 the campus was given as a gift to the Sweet Water Sustainability Institute. At the time, the main building, then 101 years old, was deteriorating, had much mold, and lacked access for disabled people. Baehr said that all of the buildings will be preserved.

== Operations ==
The school admitted Japanese students, and American students were also welcome to enroll.

As of 1989, students who graduated from Tennessee Meiji Gakuin who wished to attend Meiji Gakuin University would have received the same consideration as graduates from Meiji Gakuin-affiliated high schools in Japan. Graduates were qualified to enter Japanese and American universities.

Students attended classes for 230 days, from April to March. The days Monday through Saturday were school days, but Saturday classes involved activities outside of the classroom. This differs from area American schools, where the school year had 180 days and students went to classes only from Monday through Friday. Each school day at Tennessee Meiji Gakuin was one hour longer than a typical American school day.

The school was scheduled to employ 12 people in Sweetwater and the surrounding area. The school had eight full time local employees, including two cooks. Other local employees included custodians and employees in the school's business office.

Students who had to travel outside of the school for a period of time were required to check out of their dormitories.

=== Tuition ===
In 1989 the school levied $12,000 ($31167.79 when adjusted for inflation) for tuition and $2,000 ($5444.57 when adjusted for inflation) in one-time registration fees. Students living in the dormitories paid $4,000 ($10889.14 when adjusted for inflation) for annual room and board. The school also levied $1,000 ($2722.28 when adjusted for inflation) per year for usage of recreational areas and school buildings. In 1992 the tuition was $19,000 ($43591.42 when adjusted for inflation) per year. Choong Soon Kim, author of Japanese Industry in the American South, said the tuition was very high and few Japanese middle managers working for Japanese companies in Tennessee were able to afford to send their children to Tennessee Meiji Gakuin.

In 1994 the tuition was $13,200 per school year. In addition, the cost of food (board) was $5,000, the one time entrance fee was $3,000, and the facilities fee was $1,500. At the time the school gave a 20% discount to a student from a family not resident in Japan.

== Curriculum ==
From Monday through Friday, the English language, fine arts, health and physical education, history, the Japanese language, mathematics, religion, and science were taught in seven fifty-minute periods. With the exception of the classes in English as a foreign language, art, and physical education, all classes were conducted in the Japanese language.

In 1989, at the school's opening ceremony, the president of the University of Tennessee, Lamar Alexander, argued that the Japanese educational system that would be exhibited at Tennessee Meiji would be superior to that of American schools. He compared and contrasted the Japanese system to Maryville High School in Maryville, a then-well-regarded public school. Alexander said that the same number of courses completed at Tennessee Meiji Gakuin in three years would be completed at Maryville, and that TMG offered more difficult courses than Maryville. Alexander also stated that TMG had a longer school term, and that students were in school for six days instead of the American five days. Also Alexander said that TMG students were to receive three times the amount of homework that Maryville students received at the time.

Hiroshi Jo, the school director, stated in 1994 that the school was "quite successful" in having graduates admitted to major universities in Japan.

== Faculty ==
The Japanese government required all teachers to be Japanese nationals due to Japanese governmental requirements; this included English teachers. Hiroshi Jo, the school's director, said in 1989 that the requirement was "ridiculous." Around 1989 the school planned to have 22 to 23 teachers.

== Student body ==
The school, as originally planned in 1989, had a capacity of 69 students per grade, with a total capacity of 207.

When the school first opened, it had a class of 24 students, including 13 boys and 11 girls. Of them, one had a family living in the United States. In the northern hemisphere spring of 1992, 109 students were enrolled at the school. 70 students, 64% of the student body, were Japanese people who were resident in Japan. They attended the school even though their parents did not work in Japanese company offices in the United States. Of students residing in the U.S., the largest number, 11, lived in New England. The second largest number, 9, lived in the Midwest. 6 students, including 2 students living in Tennessee, were resident in the South.

In 1994 about 66% of the students were Japanese nationals resident in Japan while 33% were Japanese nationals resident outside Japan. Of those resident outside Japan, some lived in the United States, with many from Michigan, New Jersey, New York, and Ohio. Some students had families resident in Canada, Mexico, and South America.

In 1997 the graduating class had 194 students. The final graduating class in 2007 had 26 students.

Throughout its history, the students resident in Japan were sent to the school to learn about American culture and the English language.

== Extracurricular activities ==
Students at Meiji Gakuin often took weekend homestays with local families.

== See also ==
- Consulate-General of Japan, Nashville
- American School in Japan, American international school in Tokyo
- Japanese language education in the United States
