= Sweetwater City Schools =

School district in Tennessee, United States

Sweetwater City Schools is the school district of Sweetwater, Tennessee. It operates elementary through junior high school levels and includes the Monroe County section of Sweetwater and several unincorporated areas. Monroe County Schools serves the high school grade levels.

The U.S. Census Bureau indicates the school district is entirely in Monroe County and that the small McMinn County portion of the city is in McMinn County Schools.

== Schools ==
- Sweetwater Primary School
- Sweetwater Elementary School
- Brown Intermediate School
- Sweetwater Junior High School (SJHS)

Students continue to Sweetwater High School, operated by Monroe County Schools.
