= Frank North (American football) =

American football coach

Biographical details
- Born: December 27, 1924; Sweetwater, Tennessee, U.S.
- Died: December 19, 2017 (aged 92); Alpharetta, Georgia, U.S.

Coaching career (HC unless noted)
- 1961–1978: Marion
- 1979–1984: Livingston

Head coaching record
- Overall: 31–29 (college); 85–65 (junior college)

Frank North (December 27, 1924 – December 19, 2017) was an American football coach. North served as head coach at the Marion Military Institute from 1961 through 1978 and compiled an overall record of 85 wins and 65 losses (85–65) during his tenure there. In December 1978, he resigned his position at Marion and accepted the head coaching position at Livingston University (now the University of West Alabama). From 1979 through his resignation from the school following the 1984 season, he compiled an overall record of 31 wins and 29 losses (31–29).

== Head coaching record ==
=== College ===
Year	Team	Overall	Conference	Standing	Bowl/playoffs
Livingston Tigers (Gulf South Conference) (1979–1984)
1979	Livingston	3–8	1–5	T–6th	
1980	Livingston	5–5	2–4	T–4th	
1981	Livingston	6–3	4–2	T–2nd	
1982	Livingston	6–4	3–4	T–4th	
1983	Livingston	6–4	4–4	T–4th	
1984	Livingston	5–5	3–5	T–6th	
Livingston:		31–29			
Total:		31–29			
