= Monroe County Airport (Tennessee) =

- IATA: none; ICAO: KMNV; FAA LID: MNV

Summary
- Airport type: Public
- Owner: Monroe County
- Serves: Madisonville, Tennessee
- Elevation AMSL: 1,031 ft / 314 m
- Coordinates: 35°32′43″N 084°22′49″W

Map
- Location of airport in Tennessee KMNV (the United States)

Runways
| Direction | Length | | Surface |
| Direction | ft | m | Surface |
|---|---|---|---|
| 5/23 | 3,641 | 1,110 | Asphalt |

Statistics (2009)
- Aircraft operations: 10,800
- Based aircraft: 19
- Source: Federal Aviation Administration

Monroe County Airport (ICAO: KMNV, FAA LID: MNV) is a county-owned, public-use airport located two nautical miles (3.7 km) northwest of the central business district of Madisonville, a town in Monroe County, Tennessee, United States.

Although most U.S. airports use the same three-letter location identifier for the FAA and IATA, Monroe County Airport is assigned MNV by the FAA but has no designation from the IATA.

== Facilities and aircraft ==
Monroe County Airport covers an area of 56 acres (23 ha) at an elevation of 1,031 feet (314 m) above mean sea level. It has one runway designated 5/23 with an asphalt surface measuring 3,641 by 75 feet (1,110 x 23 m).

For the 12-month period ending November 12, 2009, the airport had 10,800 aircraft operations, an average of 29 per day: 97% general aviation, 2% air taxi, and 1% military. At that time there were 19 aircraft based at this airport: 79% single-engine and 21% multi-engine.

== See also ==
- List of airports in Tennessee
