= North Callahan =

American journalist, historian and scholar

Horace North Callahan (August 7, 1908 – December 20, 2004) was an American journalist, historian and scholar.

== Early life and education ==
Born in Sweetwater, Tennessee, Callahan was educated at the Tennessee Military Institute and the University of Chattanooga, where he graduated cum laude in 1930.

== Career ==
Callahan worked as a writer for newspapers in Tennessee and Texas and as New York City correspondent of The Dallas Morning News, eventually writing a syndicated column.

During World War II, he served in the U.S. Army as a reserve lieutenant. In the Army, he was assigned to directing recruitment publicity. He achieved the rank of lieutenant colonel before returning to civilian life.

In the post-war years, Callahan returned to academic life, earning a master's degree from Columbia University in 1950 and a PhD from New York University in 1955. He served on the faculty of Finch College as a professor of history before joining the New York University faculty in 1956. He taught at New York University until 1973.

=== Theatre ===
While at the University of Chattanooga, he played leads in dramatic and musical productions. He also organized a glee club, and appeared on the radio in musical programs. He later joined a New York stock company that toured the South.

Later in little theaters in Tennessee and Texas, he had the leading roles in the plays, "The Valiant," "First Lady," and "The Front Page." But after working for a time as a press representative for the Playwright Company in New York City, he left the theater and pursued his academic and writing career. He had written and directed three plays.

== Accomplishments ==
Callahan wrote numerous articles and 17 books, some of which received awards.

In 1964, Callahan was awarded an honorary doctorate from his alma mater, the University of Chattanooga, the only graduate of the University of Tennessee at Chattanooga to have received both an honorary degree and the Distinguished Alumnus Award. He wrote more nationally published books than any other alumnus.

The New York Times credited him for "filling a gap in the annals of the American Revolution." The Chicago Tribune stated about one of his books, "This book deserves an honored place on the library shelf of every thinking American." The Wall Street Journal wrote, "This volume places Dr. Callahan in the front rank of American historians." The American Historical Review said, "This book is a valuable contribution to a neglected aspect of American history."

== Family ==
Callahan's first marriage, to Dr. Jennie Waugh Callahan, ended in divorce; she died in 1998. His second wife, Helen Pemberton Callahan, died in September 2004. He had two children, a son also named North Callahan and daughter Mary Alice Covington.

== North Callahan Collection ==
The North Callahan Collection is a grouping of works produced by North Callahan throughout the time period 1940–1985 and maintained at the UTC Library of the University of Tennessee at Chattanooga. The North Callahan Collection includes manuscripts of many of his books, reviews, lecture notes, tests, and related teaching material. There are also photographs, plaques and awards, including photographs with celebrities such as Helen Hayes, Eleanor Roosevelt, and Mickey Rooney. In addition, Dr. Callahan donated over 1100 volumes of books dealing with American history to the library.

== Bibliography ==
Fiction:

- Peggy (1983)
- Daybreak (1985)

Non-Fiction:

- The Army: What Soldiers and Their Families Need To Know (1941)
- The Armed Forces as a Career (1947)
- Smoky Mountain Country (1952)
- Henry Knox, His Part in the American Revolution, 1775 to 1784 (doctoral dissertation, New York University, 1956)
- Henry Knox, General Washington's General (1958)
- Daniel Morgan, Ranger of the Revolution (1961)
- Royal Raiders: The Tories of the American Revolution (1963)
- Flight From the Republic: The Tories of the American Revolution (1967)
- Carl Sandburg, Lincoln of Our Literature: A Biography (1970)
- George Washington, Soldier and Man (1972)
- Connecticut's Revolutionary War Leaders (1973)
- TVA: Bridge Over Troubled Waters (1980)
- Carl Sandburg: His Life and Works (1987)
- Thanks, Mr. President: The Trail-Blazing Second Term of George Washington (1991)
