= Unicoi Turnpike =

Route in Southeast United States

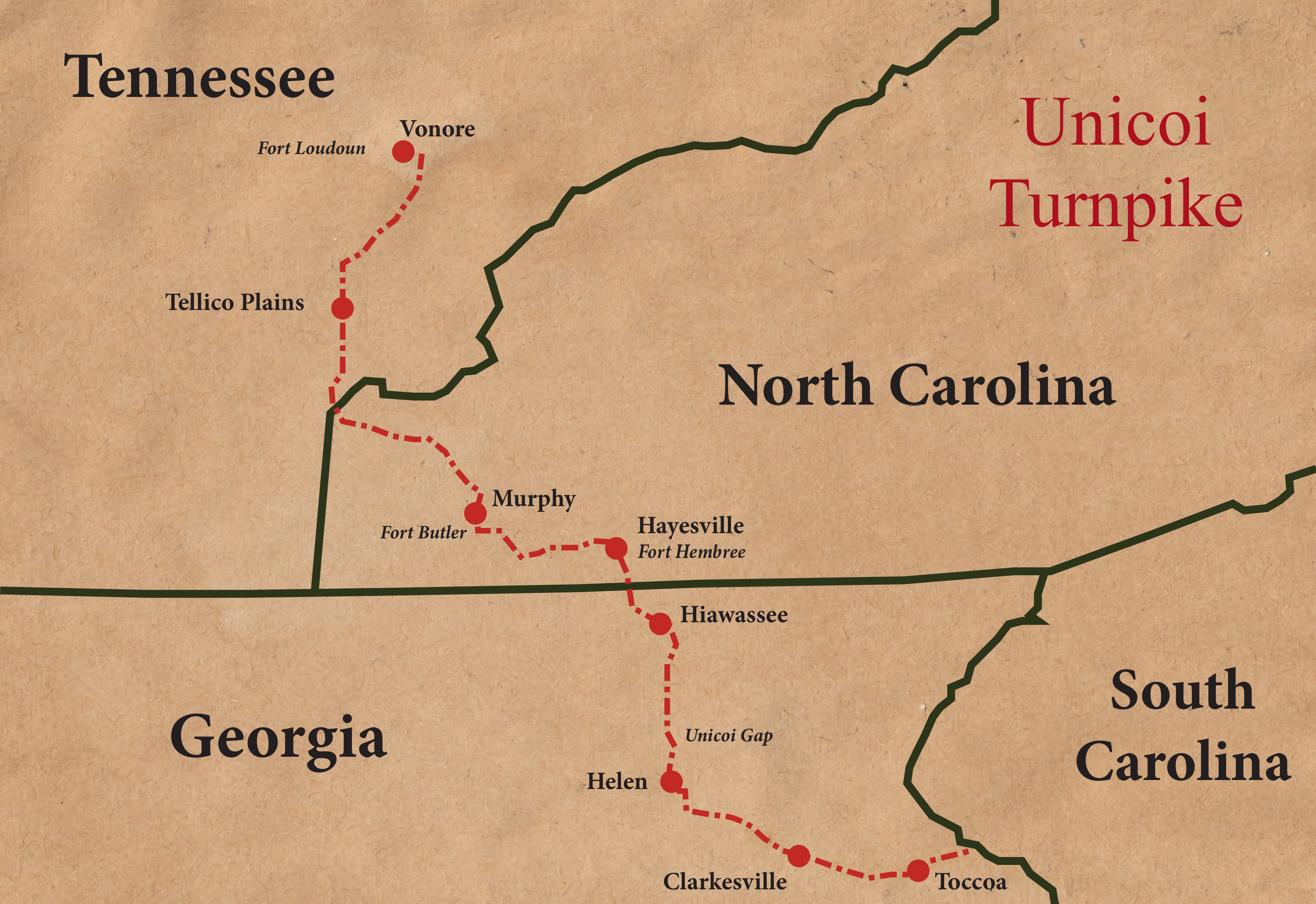
A map of the Unicoi Turnpike

The Unicoi Turnpike was a 150-mile (240km) trail through north Georgia, western North Carolina, and eastern Tennessee used by Native Americans before the footpath was converted into a toll road in the early 19th century.

== The route ==
The trail began in Tennessee at Tellico Blockhouse on the Federal Road near Nine Mile Creek in present-day Vonore. It entered the mountains in Unicoi Gap on its way east to present-day Murphy, North Carolina, and followed the Hiwassee River toward Hayesville, before turning south towards present-day Hiawassee, Georgia, and entering Georgia's Unicoi Gap. The trail then crosses Spoilcane Creek and the Chattahoochee River 11 times, dropping around 800 feet on its way to Sautee. In the Sautee-Nacoochee Valley, the turnpike connected with the Cherokee Trading Path network which included trails to present-day Virginia, Pennsylvania, and Maryland.

From Sautee-Nacoochee, the path continued east to Toccoa as the Chattahoochee River turned south. The route then connected with the Savannah River, just below the entrance of Toccoa Creek. From there, the river could be navigated to ports in Savannah and Charleston.

== History ==
The path has existed for more than 1,000 years. Even before Native Americans used the trail, large mammals migrated along the route for the winter.

In 1756, British soldiers used the road to construct Fort Loudoun during the French and Indian War. The trail later aided raids between European colonists and Cherokees during the American Revolution. In 1795 a United States fur trade factory was established in Tellico along the route. It was moved to Hiawassee in 1807 before being discontinued in 1811.

In 1813, after requests from Tennessee and Georgia, the Cherokee struck a treaty with the U.S. government to allow construction of a toll road along the path. According to the treaty, the tribe would be paid $160 per year for twenty years. After that time the agreement would be re-negotiated or the route would revert to the Cherokee's ownership. The annual amounts were reportedly never paid.

A company led by Russell Wiley worked from 1813 until 1817 to turn the trail into a two-lane toll road for wagons carrying freight. Inns and rest stops called "stands" were built along the trail at intervals of about fifteen miles. Many such rest stops grew into communities, such as Brasstown, North Carolina. The only surviving inn, Traveler's Rest in Toccoa, was designated a National Historic Landmark in 1964.

Drovers herded turkeys, hogs, and livestock on the toll road. The toll keeper was stationed in the Unicoi Gap at the state line with Tennessee. The toll ranged from twelve and a half cents for a man and his horse to $1.25 for a four-wheel “carriage of pleasure." The discovery of gold at Coker Creek in the 1820s brought an influx of people and a fort was established to separate miners from Cherokee and their lands. In the 1830s, the turnpike was the first leg of the Trail of Tears for more than 3,000 Cherokee people who were deported during the Cherokee Removal.

The toll road remained in operation until after the Civil War. Today the path is part of the Cherokee Heritage Trail project. A 2.5 mile (4.0km) section of the original trail opened for hiking in June 2005. It is located in the Cherokee National Forest in Coker Creek. The rest of the turnpike can be seen by car on roads that roughly follow the route of the old trail.

“Unicoi” was the Cherokee word for “white." The name may have referred to the mountain mist along the route or to the travelers using the road.

In 1999, the White House Millennium Council designated Unicoi Turnpike as one of 16 National Millennium Trails.
