= Sequoyah High School (Tennessee) =

American public high school

Location
- 3128 Hwy 411, Madisonville, Tennessee
- Coordinates: 35.54789°N 84.32067°W

Information
- Type: Public secondary
- Established: 1995
- School district: Monroe County Schools
- Superintendent: Kristi Windsor
- Principal: Debi Tipton
- Teaching staff: 50.00 (FTE)
- Grades: 9-12
- Enrollment: 801 (2023–2024)
- Student to teacher ratio: 16.02
- Colors: Red, white and gold
- Mascot: Chiefs
- Feeder schools: Vonore Middle School, Madisonville Middle School
- Website: Official website

Sequoyah High School is a public high school in Madisonville, Tennessee. The school, a part of Monroe County Schools, was built in 1995 and combined Vonore High School and Madisonville High School. It is named after the Cherokee Indian Sequoyah. It serves grades 9-12 and is one of three high schools in Monroe County.

The school is accredited by the Southern Association of Colleges and Schools. Sequoyah High School is recognized as a Bronze School by U.S. News & World Report. The mascot is the Chief and the school colors are red, white, and gold.

== Administration & faculty ==
John Parham is the current principal of Sequoyah High School. Sequoyah High School has a teaching staff of 60 as well as support staff of about 20.

== Academics and testing ==
| Expected to Enter | Percentage of Graduating Class |
|---|---|
| 4 Year College/University | 25% |
| 2 Year College/Technical School | 20% |

| ACT Section | Average Score |
|---|---|
| English Score | 17.7 |
| Math Score | 18.2 |

| Group | Number |
|---|---|
| African American | 9 |
| American Indian/Alaska Native | 0 |
| Hispanic/Latin | 76 |
| Native Hawaiian/Pacific Islander | 0 |
| Asian | 4 |
| White | 868 |
| Multi-Racial | 19 |
| ELS Students | 20 |
| Total Enrollment 2016-17 | 1040 |

The percentage of students who come from socioeconomically disadvantaged homes is 52.85%.

== Overall School Performance ==
The State of Tennessee Report Card for 2019 scores the school as follows. Scores can range from 0-4, with 4 being the highest.

- Academic Achievement: 2.7
- Student Academic Growth: 3.7
- Chronically Out of School: 4.0
- Ready to Graduate: 2.6
- Graduation Rate: 2.8

== Gay Straight Alliance Club ==
In August 2011, allegedly after years of teenagers being bullied for their sexual-orientation, a group of Sequoyah High students in Madisonville, wanted it to stop. However, when several students attempted to start a gay–straight alliance to address the harassment they were ordered to stop circulating a petition asking for the group to be permitted at the school. Students were threatened with suspension if they talked about the club.
