= Meiji Gakuin University =

Christian university in Tokyo

Coordinates: 35°38′15.72″N 139°43′51.95″E

- 明治学院大学
- Motto: Do For Others (他者への貢献, Tasha e no Kōken)
- Type: Private
- Established: 1863
- President: Hiroyoshi Udono
- Faculty: 1,693 (2007)
- Students: 12,182 (2008)
- Location: Tokyo and Yokohama, Japan
- Campus: Urban
- Website: www.meijigakuin.ac.jp

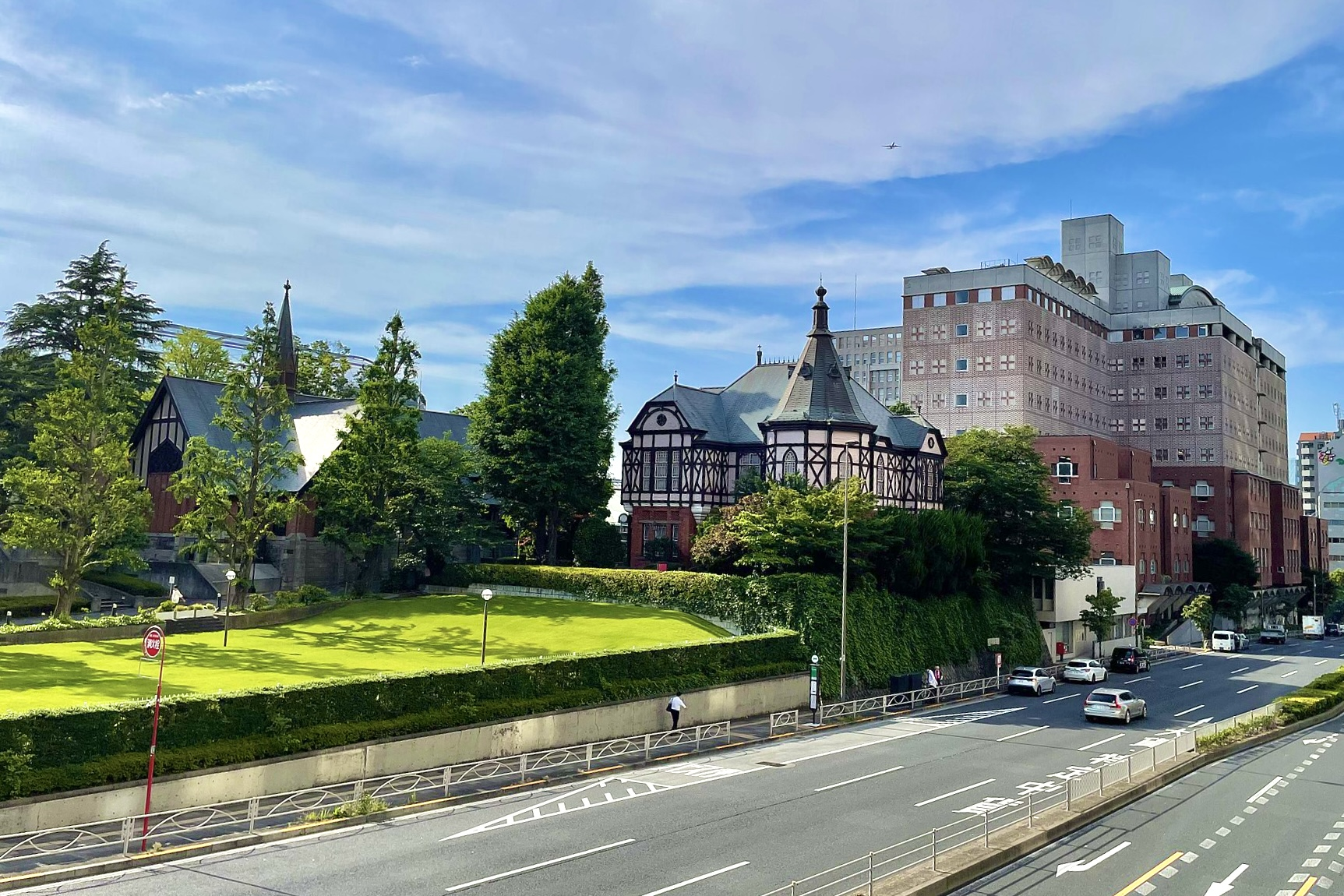
Shirokane Campus

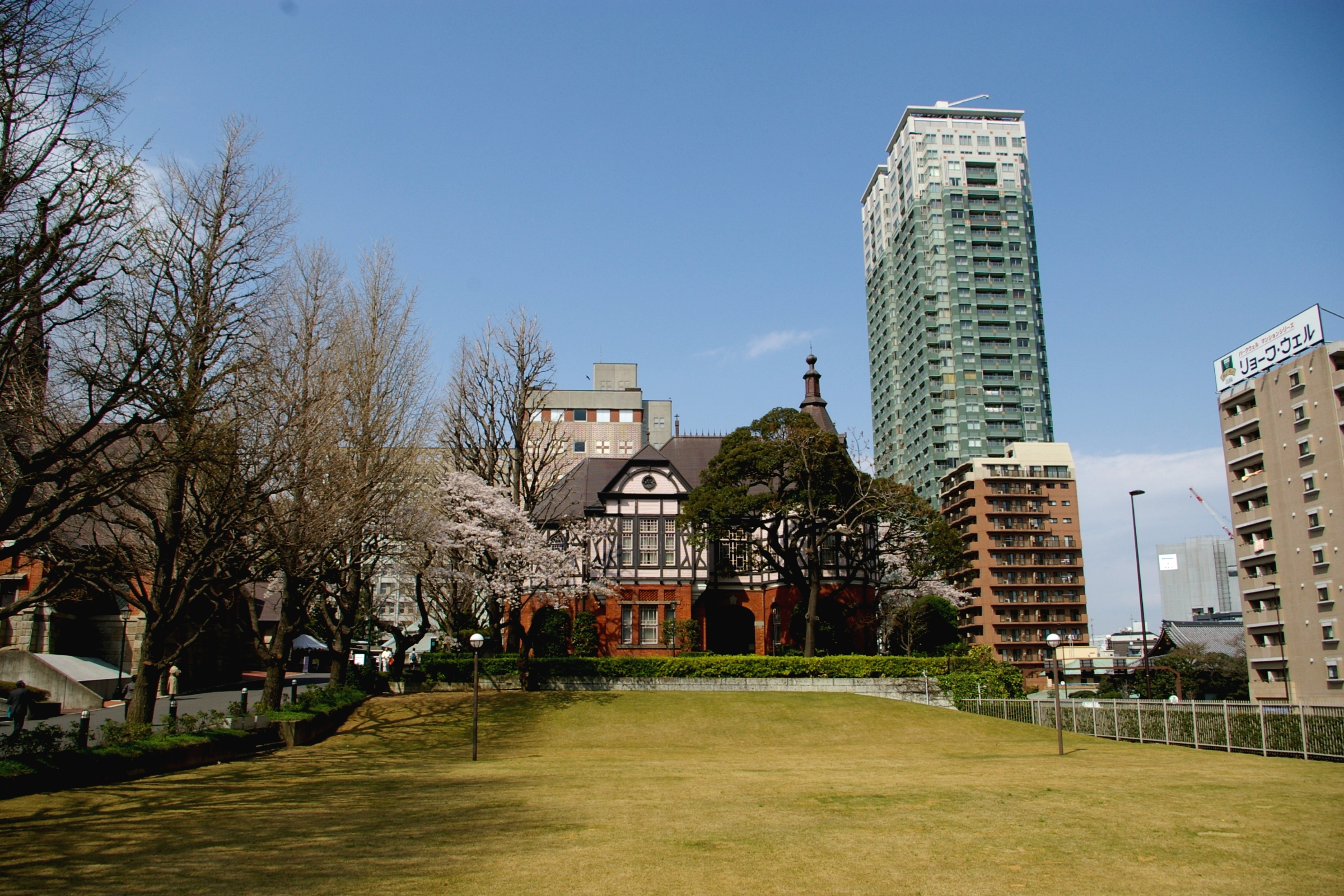
The school at daytime

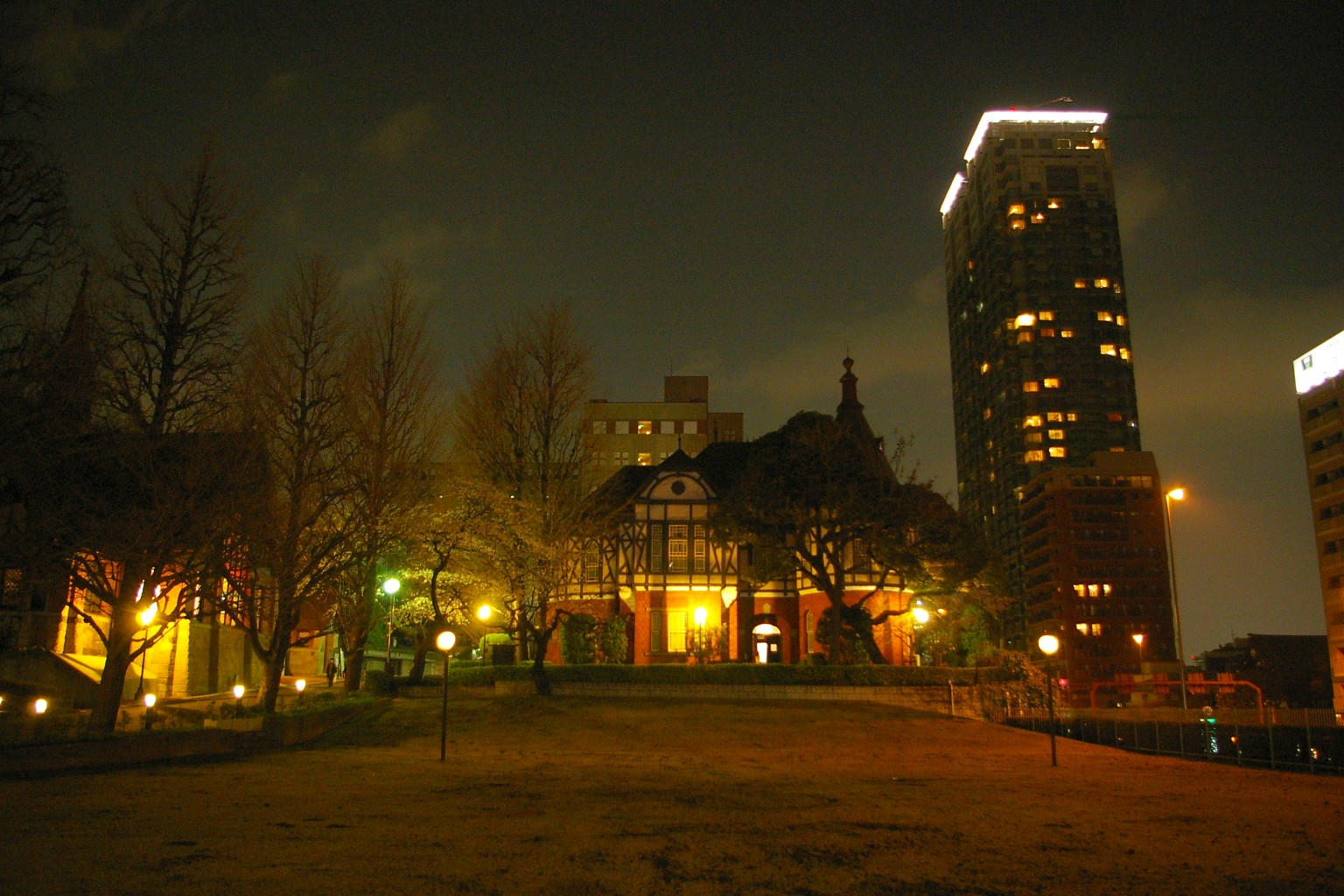
The school at nighttime

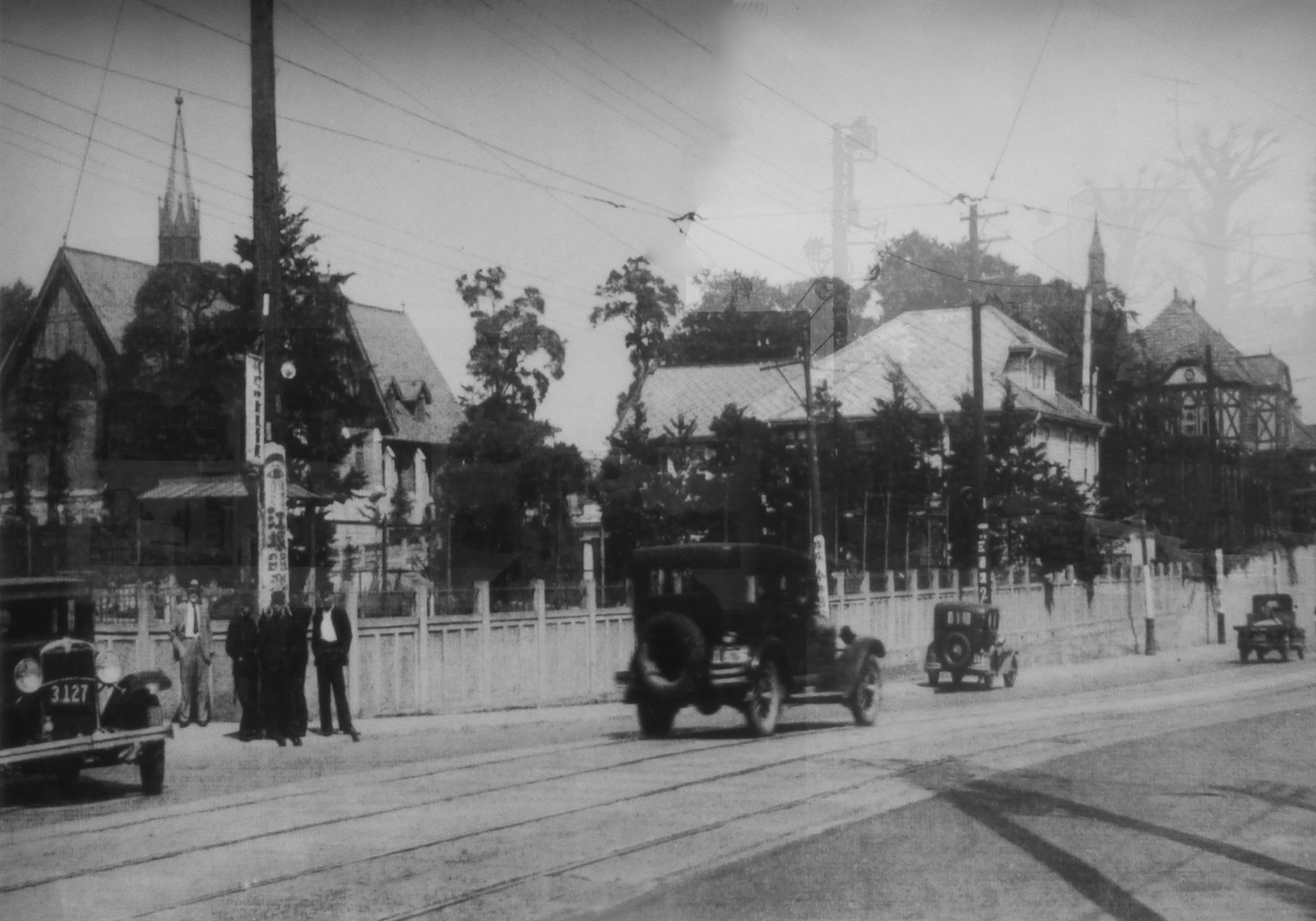
In front of the school in 1927

Meiji Gakuin University (明治学院大学, Meiji gakuin daigaku) is a private, Christian university with the main campus in Minato, Tokyo, Japan, and a satellite campus in Yokohama, Kanagawa. It was established in 1863. The Rev. Dr. James Curtis Hepburn was one of its founders and served as the first president. The novelist and poet Shimazaki Toson graduated from this university and wrote the lyrics of its college song.

== List of undergraduate schools and departments ==
- Faculty of Letters
  - Department of English
  - Department of French literature
  - Department of Art Studies
- Faculty of Economics
  - Department of Economics
  - Department of Business Administration
  - Department of International Business
- Faculty of Sociology and Social Work
  - Department of Sociology
  - Department of Social Work
- Faculty of Law
  - Department of Juridical Studies
  - Department of Political Science
  - Department of Current Legal Studies
  - Department of Global Legal Studies
- Faculty of International Studies
  - Department of International Studies
  - Department of Global and Transcultural Studies
- Faculty of Psychology
  - Department of Psychology
  - Department of Education and Child Development

== List of graduate schools ==
- Graduate School of Arts and Letters
- Graduate School of Economics
- Graduate School of Sociology and Social Work
- Graduate School of Law
- Graduate School of International Studies
- Graduate School of Psychology
- Graduate School of Business and Law

== List of research institutes ==
- Institute of Christian Research
- International Peace Research Institute
- Institute of Language and Culture
- Research Institute of Industry and Economy
- Institute of Sociology and Social Work
- Law Research Institute
- Institute of the Faculty of International Studies
- Institute of Center for Liberal Art
- Institute of the Faculty of Psychology

== List of affiliated schools ==
- Meiji Gakuin Senior High School
- Meiji Gakuin Higashi Murayama High School
- Meiji Gakuin Junior High School
- Tennessee Meiji Gakuin High School (former)
