= Fort Armistead (Tennessee) =

Fort in Tennessee, United States

Fort Armistead was a U.S. Army fort in the Cherokee National Forest near Coker Creek, Tennessee. It was founded in 1832 and was only periodically used in the following years. In 1838, Fort Armistead was re-stationed as part of an effort to forcibly relocate the Cherokee and became part of the Trail of Tears. It was then permanently abandoned and relinquished to private ownership, though the grounds may have seen brief usage during the Civil War. The site is owned by the United States Forest Service and was excavated in 2011.

On December 11, 2023, the United States Department of the Interior designated the fort site a National Historic Landmark.

== History ==
The Unicoi Turnpike was a Native American footpath across the Appalachian Mountains. In the 1810s, white settlers constructed a road along this path from Tugaloo to Chota, at the time part of the Cherokee Nation. Though initially well-traveled, the route quickly fell out of favor and was abandoned in the 1820s. Gold was discovered in Hot Water Creek near Coker Creek, Tennessee in 1827, bringing hundreds of prospectors into Cherokee land. An inn and livestock stand was established by Joseph Milligan and Phillip Meroney on the future site of the fort in 1831.

In 1832, the Governor of North Carolina petitioned President Andrew Jackson to remove the prospectors from the Cherokee land. General Walker Keith Armistead quickly dispersed the settlers and established a camp at the stock stand. With 85 to 90 men on site, it was the only US Army post in Cherokee territory. By 1834, following occupation by Companies C and F of the Fourth Infantry, the site became known as Fort Armistead. Later that year, Fort Cass was built in modern Charleston, Tennessee, and Fort Armistead only saw periodic occupation in subsequent years.

In December 1835, the Treaty of New Echota was signed, beginning the forcible removal of the Cherokee. From April 1837 to March 1838, the fort was occupied as troops searched for bands of Muscogee eluding relocation. That June, a detachment of the East Tennessee Mounted Volunteers was stationed there to secure communications between Fort Cass and Fort Butler; General Winfield Scott and Robert Anderson lodged there in on June 13 after overseeing the onset of the Cherokee relocation. Within a week, groups of 100 to 1,250 prisoners would be escorted through Fort Armistead was they were moved 80 miles (130 km) from Fort Butler to Fort Cass. More than 3,000 deportees from North Carolina were moved along this road by the end of July 1838.

The fort was again abandoned after this wave of deportees moved through, though it was occasionally used from September to November as a base to search for escapees in the mountains. The forced relocation due to the Treaty of New Echota officially ended in December 1838, though searches continued for a few more months. Soon afterward, the property was sold into private ownership to Alban Jones. In 1862, during the American Civil War, a small Confederate fort was established on the site of the former Fort Armistead. The site was abandoned again in March 1863. A pro-Union guerilla company of volunteers led by Goldman Bryson may have used the site as a base until they were captured and executed by the 8th Tennessee Cavalry. The parcel was again held privately after the war, and remained so until 2005. The name site of the fort became forgotten, though memories of its use during the Trail of Tears remained.

The United States Forest Service purchased the site in 2005 as an expansion of the Cherokee National Forest. In the summer of 2011, archaeologists from the University of North Carolina at Chapel Hill excavated the grounds. Due to the mountainous terrain, the site had seen little disturbance since the fort shut down.
