= List of federal lands in Tennessee =

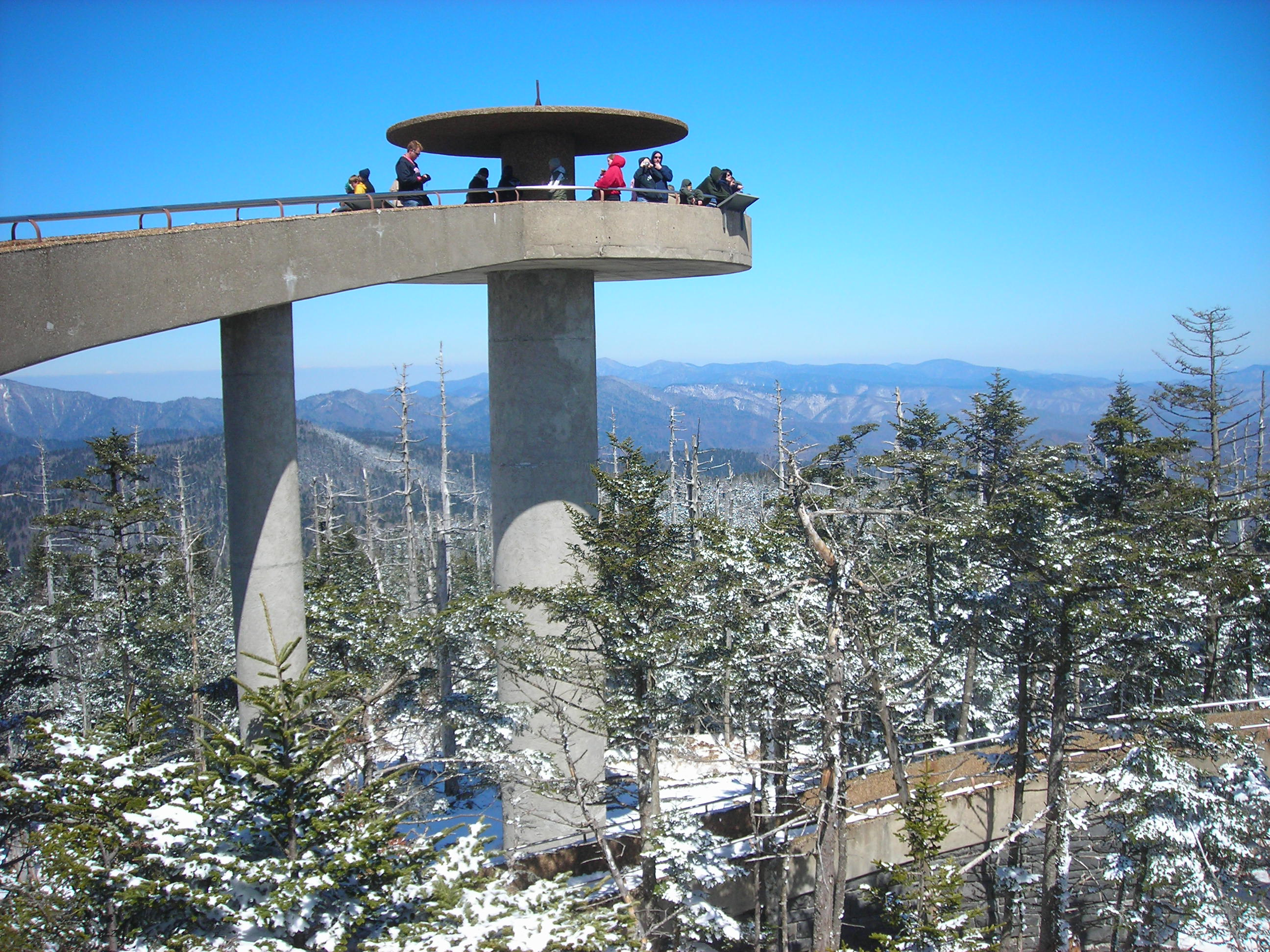
Great Smoky Mountains National Park

Below are the Federal lands in the United States state of Tennessee.

== National Historic Sites ==
- Andrew Johnson National Historic Site, established as a National Monument in 1935 and redesignated a National Historic Site in 1963

== National Cemetery ==
- Andrew Johnson National Cemetery
- Fort Donelson National Cemetery
- Shiloh National Cemetery
- Stones River National Cemetery

== National Recreation Areas ==
- Big South Fork National River and Recreation Area, shared with Kentucky

== National Military Parks ==
- Chickamauga and Chattanooga National Military Park (shared with Georgia), established 1890
- Shiloh National Military Park, established 1894

== National Historical Parks ==
- Cumberland Gap National Historical Park (shared with Kentucky and Virginia), established 1940

== National Battlefields ==
- Fort Donelson National Battlefield, established 1928
- Stones River National Battlefield, established 1927

== National Parks ==
- Great Smoky Mountains National Park, shared with North Carolina

== National Parkways and Scenic Trails ==
- Natchez Trace Parkway, shared with Mississippi and Alabama
- Natchez Trace National Scenic Trail, shared with Mississippi

== National Scenic Rivers ==
- Obed Wild and Scenic River

== National Forests ==
- Cherokee National Forest

== National Historic Trails ==
- Overmountain Victory National Historic Trail, shared with Virginia, North Carolina, South Carolina
- Trail of Tears National Historic Trail, shared with Oklahoma
