= Madisonville, Tennessee =

- City
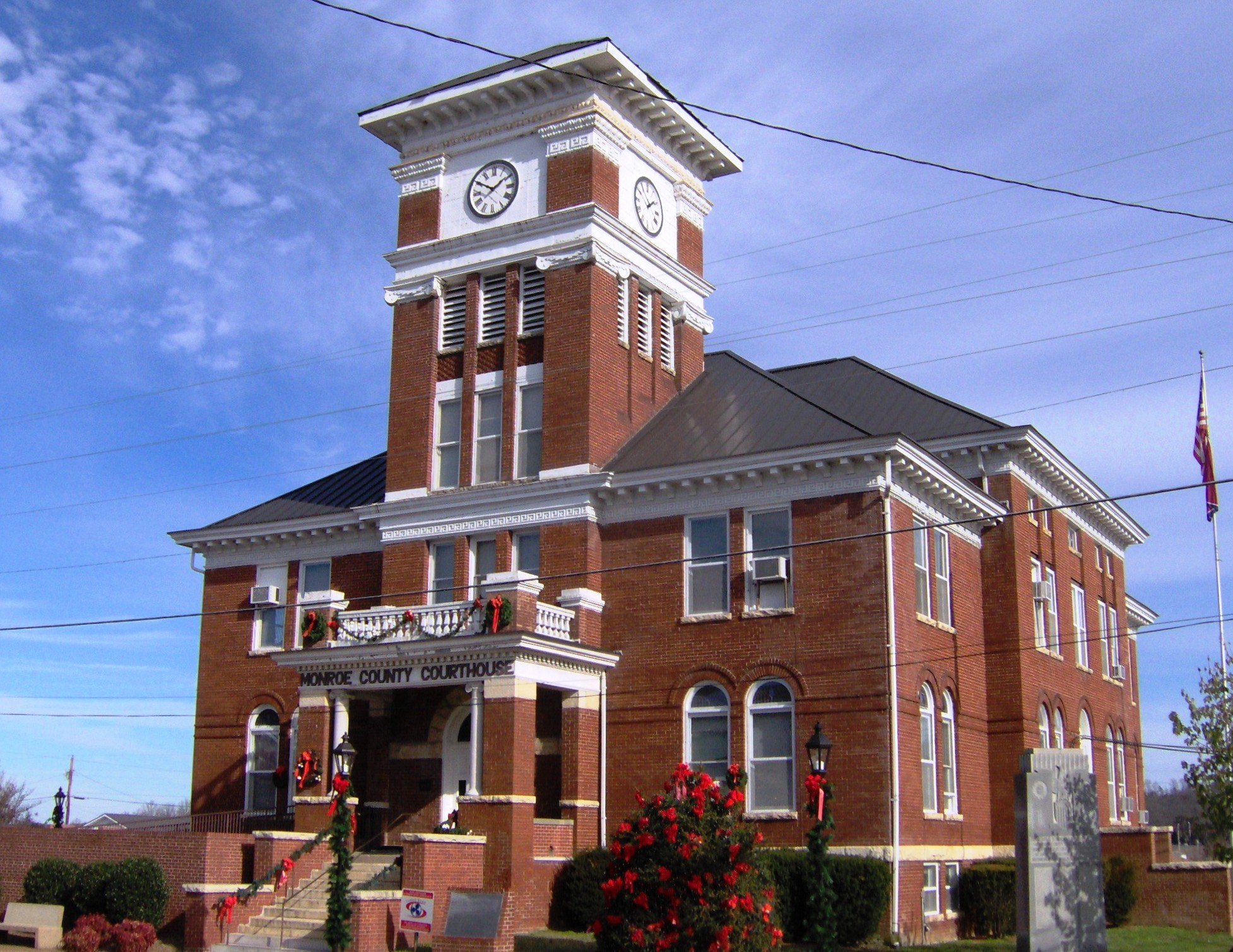
- Monroe County Courthouse in Madisonville

- Flag

- Location of Madisonville in Monroe County, Tennessee.

- Location within the state of Tennessee
- Coordinates: 35°31′23″N 84°21′47″W
- Country: United States
- State: Tennessee
- County: Monroe
- Founded: 1822
- Incorporated: 1866
- Named for: James Madison

Area
  - Total: 6.01 sq mi (15.56 km^{2})
  - Land: 6.00 sq mi (15.55 km^{2})
  - Water: 0.0039 sq mi (0.01 km^{2})
- Elevation: 961 ft (293 m)

Population (2020)
  - Total: 5,132 ▲
  - Density: 854.7/sq mi (329.99/km^{2})
- Time zone: UTC-5 (Eastern (EST))
  - Summer (DST): UTC-4 (EDT)
- ZIP Code: 37354
- Area code: 423
- FIPS code: 47-45320
- GNIS feature ID: 2404995
- Website: www.madisonvilletn.net

Madisonville is the county seat of Monroe County, Tennessee, United States. It is located in East Tennessee on the eastern border of the state. As of the 2020 census, the city's population was 5,132.

== Geography ==
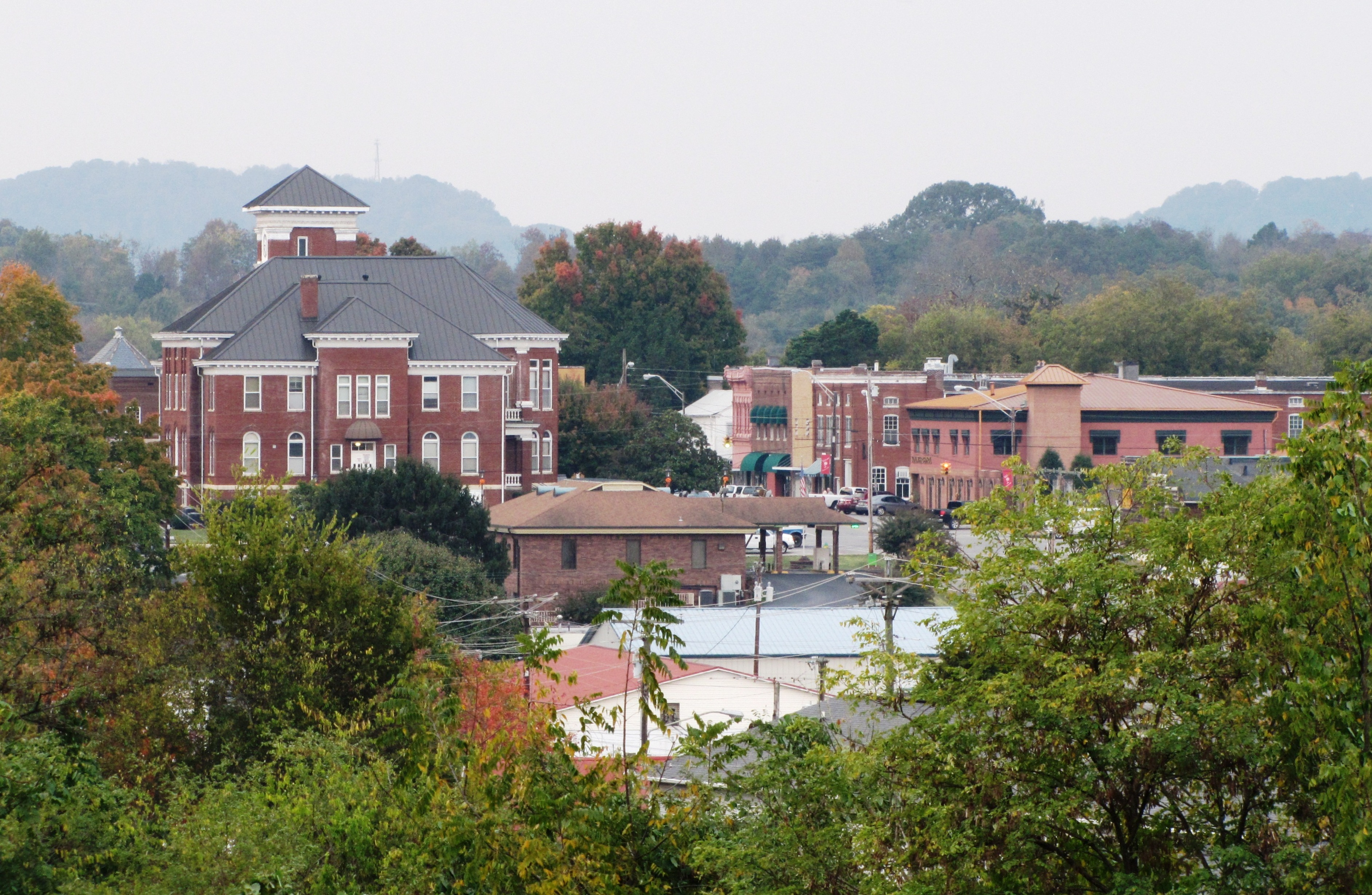
Madisonville, viewed from the Veteran's Monument along US-411

Madisonville is situated along U.S. Route 411 just east of its junction with State Route 68, near the center of Monroe County. The Unicoi Mountains rise prominently to the southeast.

According to the United States Census Bureau, Madisonville has a total area of 5.8 square miles (15 km^{2}), all land.

== Demographics ==
Historical population
Census	Pop.	Note	%±
1870	324		—
1920	850		—
1930	926		8.9%
1940	965		4.2%
1950	1,487		54.1%
1960	1,812		21.9%
1970	2,614		44.3%
1980	2,884		10.3%
1990	3,033		5.2%
2000	3,939		29.9%
2010	4,577		16.2%
2020	5,132		12.1%

=== 2020 census ===
As of the 2020 census, Madisonville had a population of 5,132, 2,032 households, and 1,131 families residing in the city. The median age was 38.7 years; 23.0% of residents were under the age of 18 and 19.0% were 65 years of age or older. For every 100 females there were 93.7 males, and for every 100 females age 18 and over there were 91.1 males.

92.0% of residents lived in urban areas, while 8.0% lived in rural areas.

There were 2,032 households in Madisonville, of which 31.8% had children under the age of 18 living in them. Of all households, 39.3% were married-couple households, 19.0% were households with a male householder and no spouse or partner present, and 34.0% were households with a female householder and no spouse or partner present. About 32.5% of all households were made up of individuals and 16.2% had someone living alone who was 65 years of age or older.

There were 2,269 housing units, of which 10.4% were vacant. The homeowner vacancy rate was 2.8% and the rental vacancy rate was 10.9%.

Racial composition as of the 2020 census
Race	Number	Percent
White	4,464	87.0%
Black or African American	151	2.9%
American Indian and Alaska Native	16	0.3%
Asian	29	0.6%
Native Hawaiian and Other Pacific Islander	4	0.1%
Some other race	95	1.9%
Two or more races	373	7.3%
Hispanic or Latino (of any race)	206	4.0%

=== 2000 census ===
As of the census of 2000, there were 3,939 people, 1,671 households, and 1,066 families residing in the town. The population density was 677.4 inhabitants per square mile (261.5/km^{2}). There were 1,806 housing units at an average density of 310.6 units per square mile (119.9 units/km^{2}). The racial makeup of the town was 93.42% White, 3.96% African American, 0.25% Native American, 0.33% Asian, 0.13% Pacific Islander, 0.79% from other races, and 1.12% from two or more races. Hispanic or Latino of any race were 2.01% of the population.

There were 1,671 households, out of which 27.6% had children under the age of 18 living with them, 46.4% were married couples living together, 13.8% had a female householder with no husband present, and 36.2% were non-families. 32.0% of all households were made up of individuals, and 12.9% had someone living alone who was 65 years of age or older. The average household size was 2.26 and the average family size was 2.86.

In the town the population was spread out, with 23.0% under the age of 18, 9.6% from 18 to 24, 27.6% from 25 to 44, 22.6% from 45 to 64, and 17.2% who were 65 years of age or older. The median age was 36 years. For every 100 females, there were 89.7 males. For every 100 females age 18 and over, there were 85.6 males.

The median income for a household in the town was $29,250, and the median income for a family was $31,918. Males had a median income of $31,504 versus $23,828 for females. The per capita income for the town was $16,468. About 13.3% of families and 18.8% of the population were below the poverty line, including 26.8% of those under age 18 and 14.0% of those age 65 or over.

== History ==
The City of Madisonville originally began as the town of Tellico, and prior to that a Cherokee village of the same name. The Calhoun Treaty and resulting Hiwassee Purchase of 1819 opened the area for white settlement. Madisonville was founded in the early 1820s as a county seat for Monroe County, which had been formed in 1819. The town was initially known as "Tellico," but its name was changed to "Madisonville" in 1830 in honor of U.S. President James Madison in accordance with a petition from the residents presented by state representative James Madison Greenway. Madisonville was incorporated on May 16, 1850.

== Airport ==
The Monroe County Airport is a county-owned, public-use airport located two nautical miles (3.7 km) northwest of the central business district of Madisonville.

== Education ==
Hiwassee College, now closed, was located just north of the Madisonville city limits. Madisonville is also home to a satellite campus of Cleveland State Community College.

The Monroe County Schools System serves Madisonville. The schools include:

- Madisonville Primary School
- Madisonville Intermediate School
- Madisonville Middle School
- Sequoyah High School

Sequoyah was formed by the consolidation of Vonore High School and Madisonville High School in 1995.

== Notable people ==
- Isaac Cline - meteorologist, born nearby
- Sue K. Hicks - Scopes Trial attorney and influence for the ballad, "A Boy Named Sue"
- Estes Kefauver - U.S. Congressman and Senator who ran for Vice President as Adlai Stevenson's running mate in 1956
- Sharon Gail Lee - Tennessee Supreme Court Justice
- Tod Sloan - Major League Baseball outfielder
- EmiSunshine - singer/songwriter
