= Coker Creek, Tennessee =

- Unincorporated community
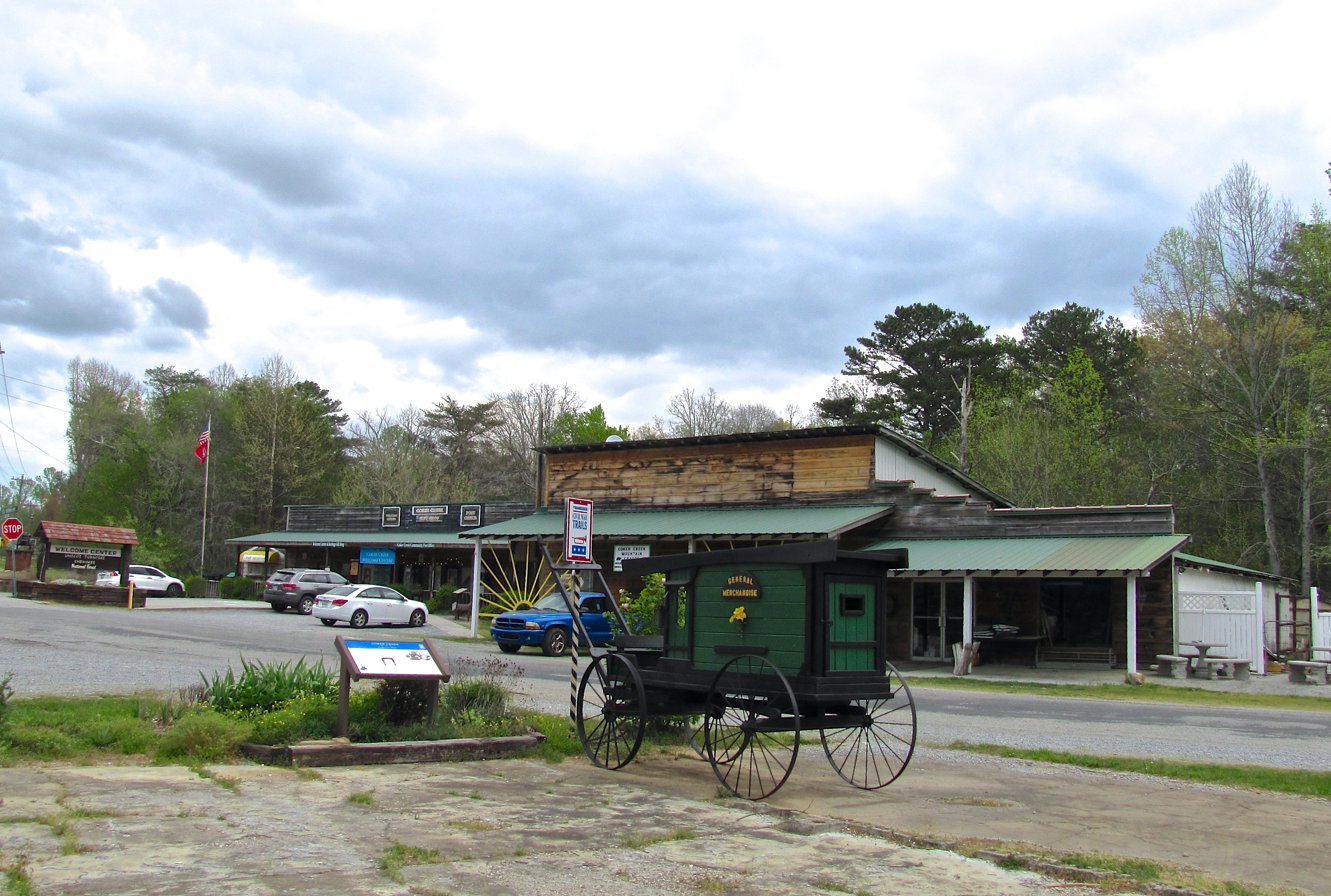
- Shops in Coker Creek

- Location within Tennessee Location within the United States
- Coordinates: 35°15′48″N 84°17′18″W
- Country: United States
- State: Tennessee
- County: Monroe
- Elevation: 1,624 ft (495 m)

Population (2020)
  - Total: 150
- Time zone: UTC-5 (Eastern (EST))
  - Summer (DST): UTC-4 (EDT)
- ZIP code: 37314
- Area code: 423
- GNIS feature ID: 2813107

Coker Creek is an unincorporated community in Monroe County, Tennessee, United States. It is located on Tennessee State Route 68, 6.7 miles (10.8 km) south of Tellico Plains. Its population in the 2020 census was 150.

Coker Creek lies in the southern Appalachian Mountains (specifically, the Unicoi Mountains) completely surrounded by the Cherokee National Forest, and just west of the Tennessee-North Carolina state line. Tellico Mountain lies to the north, Farner Mountain to the south, Unicoi Mountain to the east, and Cataska Mountain to the west. There are homes and businesses, 11 graveyards, nine churches, and many hiking trails and artisan shops as well as a Christian summer camp, Smoky Mountain Christian Camp. The area is known for its trout fishing and the mountains are home to rhododendron, laurel, ferns and the many species of trees native to this area.

== History ==
Coker Creek was Cherokee land prior to the Cherokee removal in 1838 and was known even in the early twentieth century as "Coco" or "Coqua," the Cherokee name for butterfly weed. Archaeological evidence suggests the presence of a stone tool factory during the Archaic Period. A trading path between the lower settlements and overhill towns passed through the area, and in 1816 this path was developed as the Unicoi Turnpike.

Europeans learned from the Indians about the presence of placer gold in the area, and in 1827 Jacob Peck and Le Grande Henderson began mining illegally. Other European prospectors and settlers followed. Robert Tunnell started a post office near Coker Creek in 1831 and Philip Meroney operated a stock stand (service station) at the present location. In response to complaints from the Cherokee, General Walker Keith Armistead toured the area and established Fort Armistead at the site of Meroney's Stand to repel the prospectors. With the shift of Indian policy under president Andrew Jackson, the fort later became a way-point used in the removal. The Coker Creek field produced about 9,000 troy ounces (280 kg), nearly all of Tennessee's historical gold output, despite using no more than light machinery.

The Civil War brought strife to Coker Creek as locals resisted the Confederate government and deserters and bushwhackers hid out in the mountains. Companies from Thomas' Legion of remnant Cherokee and pro-Confederate highlanders were stationed in Coker Creek to enforce Confederate authority. Union forces also passed through the community, but there were no direct military confrontations. Gold mining was interrupted during the war, and afterward continued until 1911. A Civilian Conservation Corps camp was established on the turnpike in the 1930s and later served as a Boy Scout camp.

In 1884 local miller and Baptist minister R. G. Spurling was expelled from his church for preaching to non-Baptist congregations in defiance of Landmarkism. After two years of Bible study he founded the Christian Union, a forerunner of the Pentecostal Church of God. A marker 3.7 miles (6.0 km) from the main intersection commemorates the founding location.

== Education ==
Monroe County Schools operates public schools. Coker Creek School serves the community.
