= Sweetwater, Tennessee =

City in the United States

- City
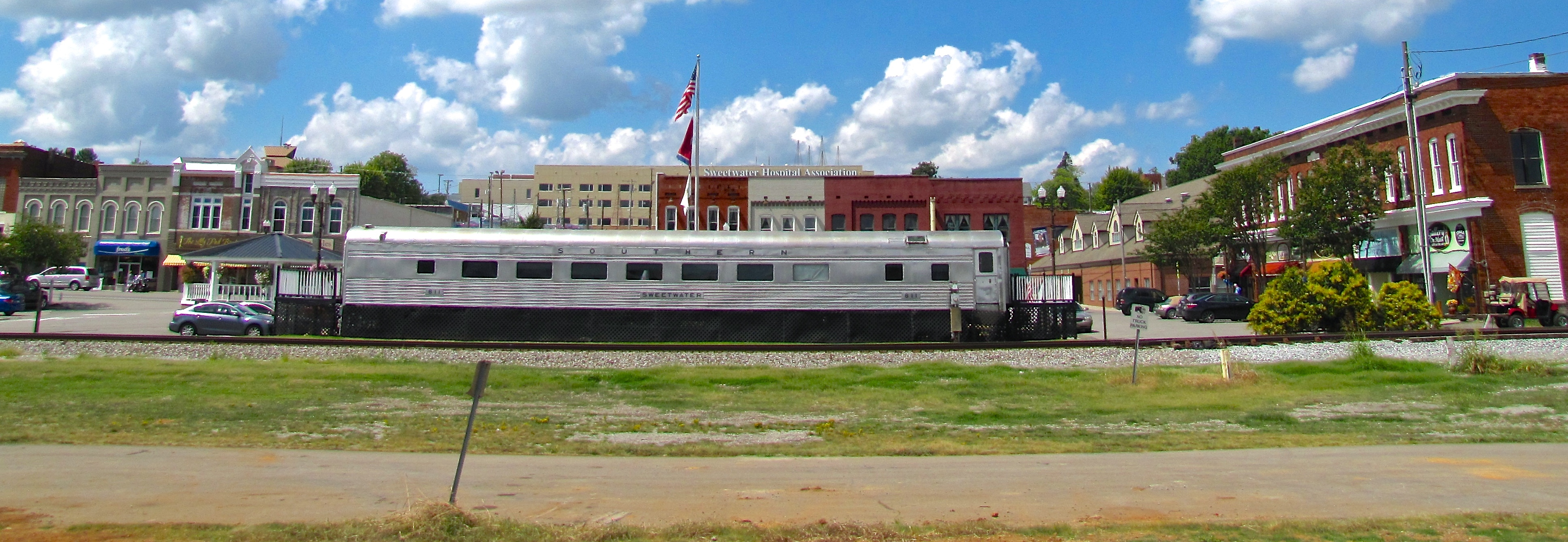
- Downtown area, September 2016

- Location of Sweetwater in Monroe County and Mcminn County, Tennessee.
- Coordinates: 35°36′10″N 84°28′18″W
- Country: United States
- State: Tennessee
- Counties: Monroe and McMinn
- Established: 1850s
- Incorporated: 1875

Area
  - Total: 8.85 sq mi (22.92 km^{2})
  - Land: 8.84 sq mi (22.89 km^{2})
  - Water: 0.012 sq mi (0.03 km^{2})
- Elevation: 1,011 ft (308 m)

Population (2020)
  - Total: 6,312
  - Density: 714.3/sq mi (275.79/km^{2})
- Time zone: UTC-5 (Eastern (EST))
  - Summer (DST): UTC-4 (EDT)
- ZIP code: 37874
- Area code: 423
- FIPS code: 47-72540
- GNIS feature ID: 2405553
- Website: www.sweetwatertn.net

Sweetwater is a city in Monroe and McMinn Counties in the U.S. state of Tennessee, and the most populous city in Monroe County. As of the 2020 census, its population was 6,312. Sweetwater is the home of the Craighead Caverns which contains the Lost Sea, the United States' largest underground lake. In 2022, TravelMag named Sweetwater one of Tennessee's "Ten Most Charming Cities".

== History ==
A legend states that the town's name originated from settlers' descriptions of area springs.

Sweetwater was established in the 1850s on a series of lots sold by Isaac Lenoir (1807–1875), a local politician and son of the founder of Lenoir City (located a few miles to the northeast in Loudon County). Sweetwater was officially incorporated in 1875.

== Geography ==
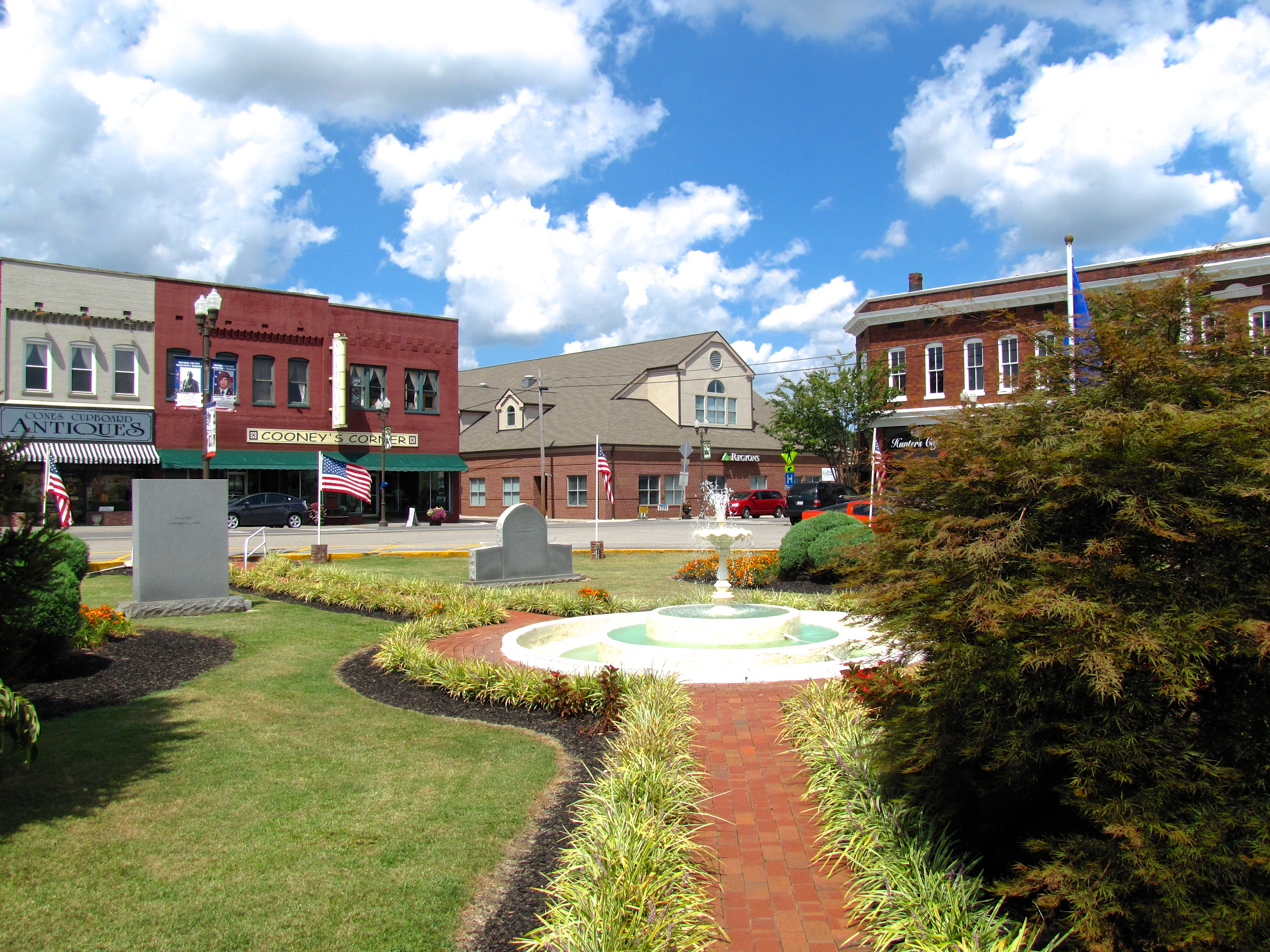
Circle Park, September 2016

The city lies along Sweetwater Creek, which flows northeast for several miles before emptying into the Watts Bar Lake impoundment of the Tennessee River. The creek's drainage has created a lowland area known as Sweetwater Valley, which is surrounded by low hills.

Sweetwater is centered along U.S. Route 11 between its junction with State Route 68 to the south and State Route 322 to the north. Interstate 75 passes along the western boundary of Sweetwater.

According to the United States Census Bureau, the city has a total area of 6.9 square miles (18 km^{2}), all land.

Sweetwater is located in a valley amid the foothills of the Great Smoky Mountains, and is surrounded by farmland.

Historical population
Census	Pop.	Note	%±
1880	677		—
1890	879		29.8%
1900	1,716		95.2%
1910	1,850		7.8%
1920	1,972		6.6%
1930	2,271		15.2%
1940	2,593		14.2%
1950	4,199		61.9%
1960	4,145		−1.3%
1970	4,340		4.7%
1980	4,725		8.9%
1990	5,066		7.2%
2000	5,586		10.3%
2010	5,764		3.2%
2020	6,312		9.5%

== Demographics ==
=== 2020 census ===
As of the 2020 census, Sweetwater had a population of 6,312, 2,520 households, and 1,633 families.

The median age was 42.6 years. 22.9% of residents were under the age of 18 and 21.5% of residents were 65 years of age or older. For every 100 females there were 86.9 males, and for every 100 females age 18 and over there were 83.2 males age 18 and over.

95.0% of residents lived in urban areas, while 5.0% lived in rural areas.

Of the 2,520 households in Sweetwater, 29.5% had children under the age of 18 living in them. Of all households, 43.5% were married-couple households, 17.2% were households with a male householder and no spouse or partner present, and 32.7% were households with a female householder and no spouse or partner present. About 31.5% of all households were made up of individuals and 17.5% had someone living alone who was 65 years of age or older.

There were 2,816 housing units, of which 10.5% were vacant. The homeowner vacancy rate was 2.6% and the rental vacancy rate was 9.0%.

Racial composition as of the 2020 census
Race	Number	Percent
White	5,324	84.3%
Black or African American	333	5.3%
American Indian and Alaska Native	23	0.4%
Asian	47	0.7%
Native Hawaiian and Other Pacific Islander	0	0.0%
Some other race	155	2.5%
Two or more races	430	6.8%
Hispanic or Latino (of any race)	312	4.9%

=== 2000 census ===
As of the census of 2000, 5,586 people, 2,315 households, and 1,537 families were residing in the city. The population density was 810.1 inhabitants per square mile (312.8/km^{2}). The 2,511 housing units had an average density of 364.2 units per square mile (140.6 units/km^{2}). The racial makeup of the city was 86.6% White, 7.32% African American, 0.14% Native American, 1.61% Asian, 0.02% Pacific Islander, 0.41% from other races, and 1.97% from two or more races. Hispanics or Latinos of any race were 3.6% of the population.

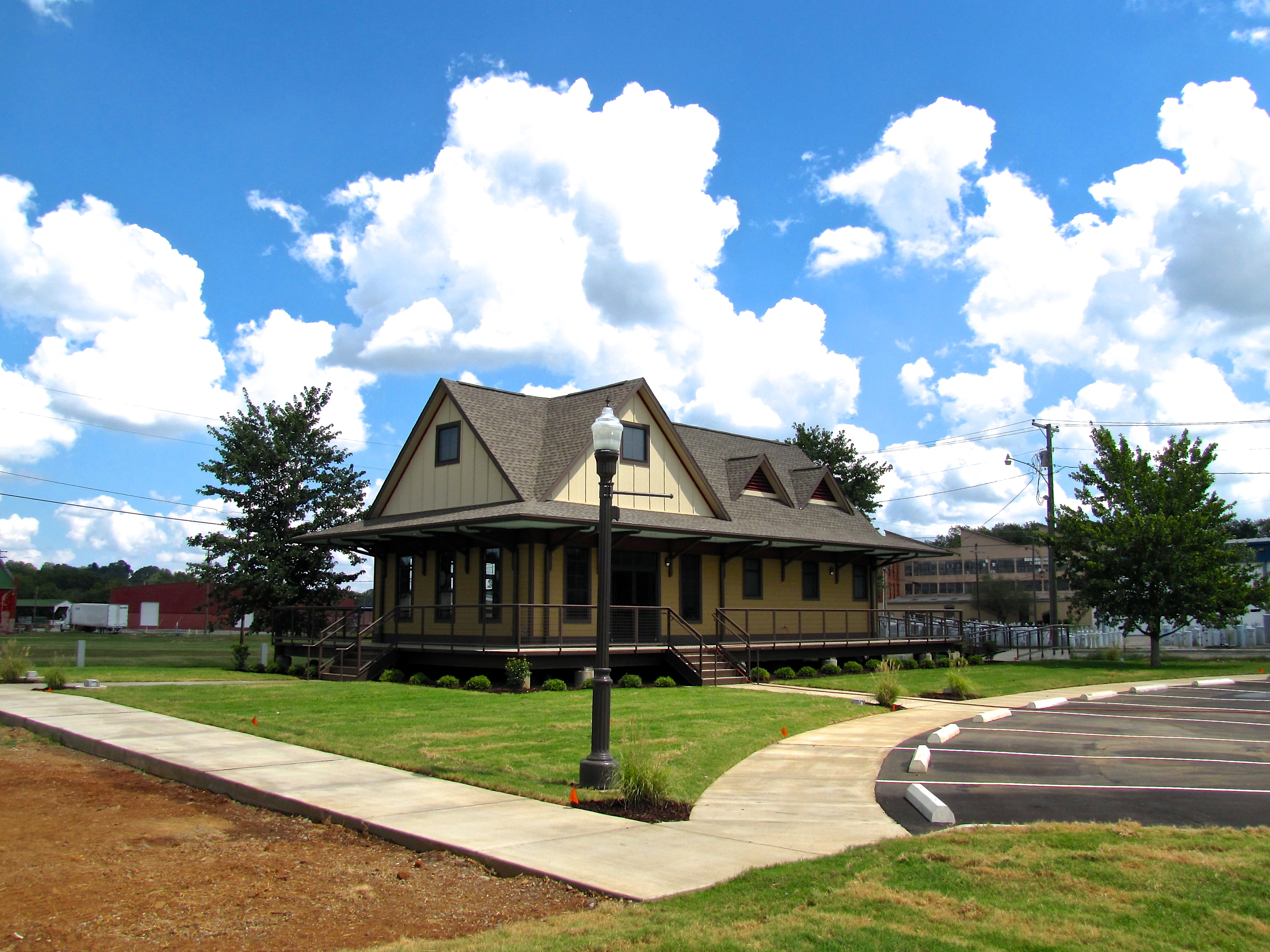
Sweetwater Depot, September 2016

Of the 2,315 households, 27.4% had children under 18 living with them, 49.0% were married couples living together, 13.9% had a female householder with no husband present, and 33.6% were not families. About 30.5% of all households were made up of individuals, and 14.3% had someone living alone who was 65 or older. The average household size was 2.32 and the average family size was 2.87.

In the city, the age distribution was 23.0% under 18, 8.1% from 18 to 24, 25.1% from 25 to 44, 23.3% from 45 to 64, and 20.5% who were 65 or older. The median age was 40 years. For every 100 females, there were 82.1 males. For every 100 females 18 and over, there were 77.4 males.

The median income for a household in the city was $28,323, and for a family was $35,269. Males had a median income of $29,982 versus $23,075 for females. The per capita income for the city was $16,746. About 11.5% of families and 16.4% of the population were below the poverty line, including 29.5% of those under 18 and 18.1% of those 65 or over.

== Economy ==
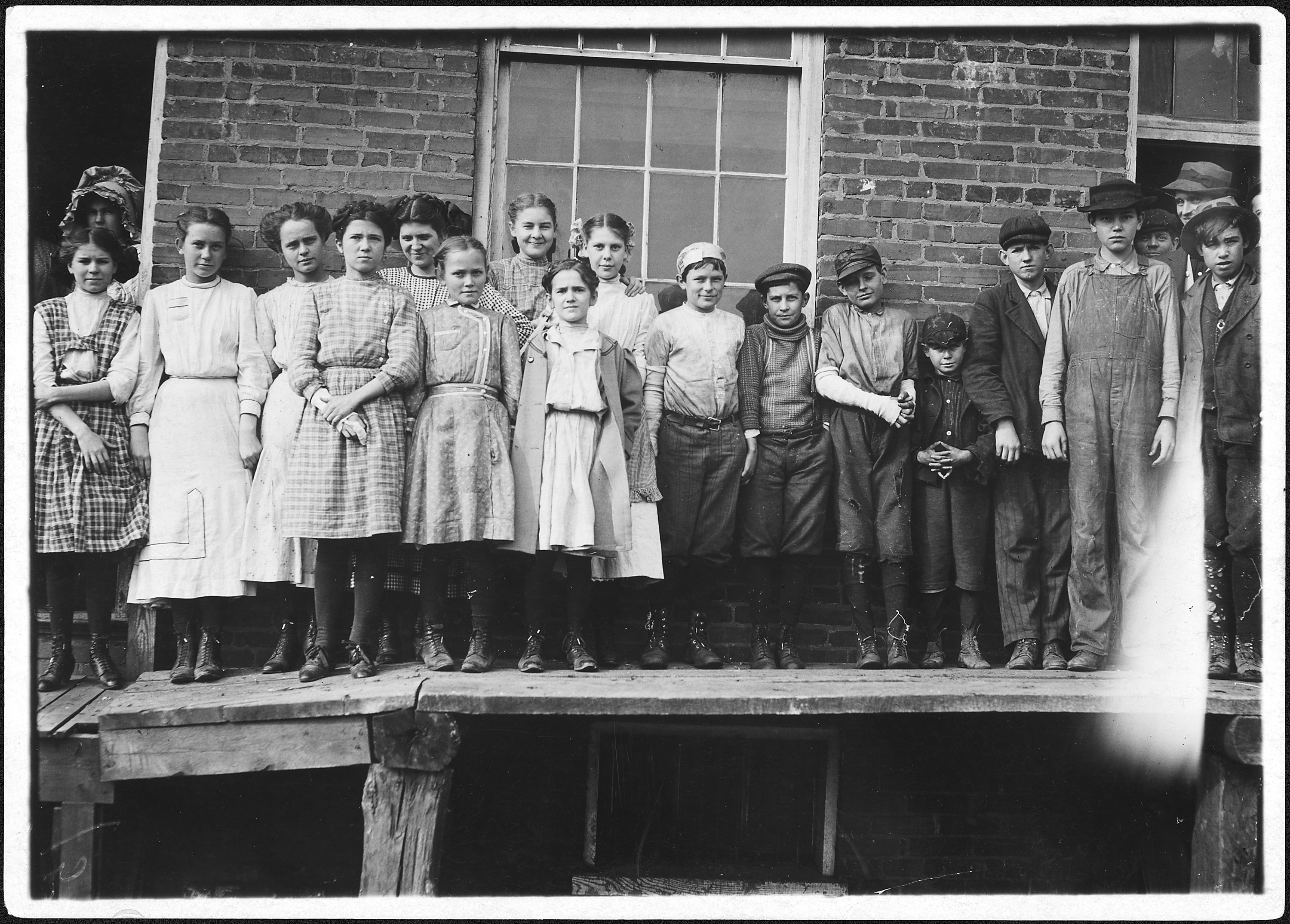
Sweetwater Hosiery Co., December 1910

As of 1989, most of the economy consisted of agriculture business. In addition, some light industry was located in Sweetwater, including a chemical factory, a hosiery mill, and a stove plant. A new Walmart Supercenter opened on September 11, 2013, and added 200 jobs to the Sweetwater area. A Rural King store opened in Feb 2018. On January 15, 2022, Red Stag Fulfillment announced plans to develop a 420-acre ecommerce distribution center along I-75, estimated to provide 3,500 jobs and annual tax revenue of $1.9 million to the city of Sweetwater.

== Education ==
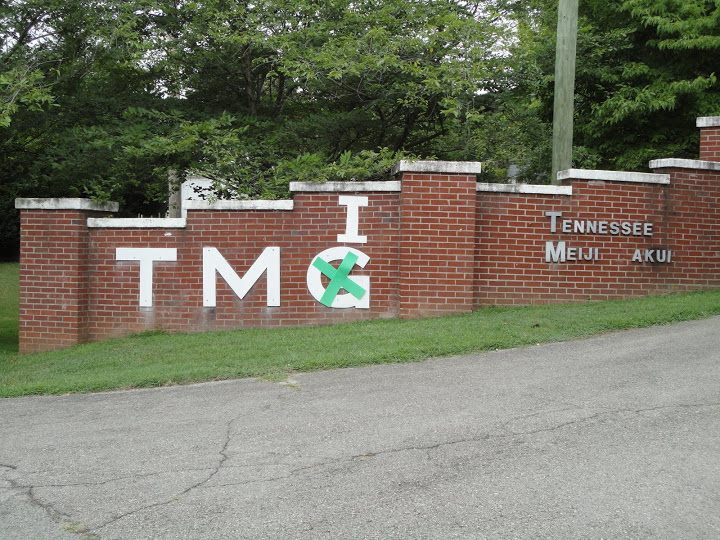
Tennessee Meiji Gakuin High School entrance sign, November 2014

Sweetwater City Schools operate public elementary and middle schools in the portion of the city in Monroe County, with Monroe County Schools operating high-school services. Sweetwater High School is part of the Monroe district.

The U.S. Census Bureau indicates the Sweetwater district is entirely in Monroe County, and that the small McMinn County portion of the city is in McMinn County Schools.

Tennessee Meiji Gakuin High School was located in Sweetwater from 1989 to 2007. It was located in the former Tennessee Military Institute.

Cross Creek Kindergarten - Grade 12 operates as a private Christian school. It was developed by Karen Darragh and Harold Jeffers Darragh, who also developed Willow Creek.

== Notable people ==
- Butch Baker, country music artist
- Gerald Brown, NFL and collegiate coach
- Kippy Brown, NFL and collegiate coach
- Harry T. Burn (1895–1977), a Tennessee legislator, broke the deadlock on the Nineteenth Amendment to the United States Constitution and gave women the right to vote in the United States.
- North Callahan, historian and journalist
- Dwight Henry, politician
- Paul Dean Holt, former NASCAR Winston Cup driver
- Frank North, collegiate coach
- Gerald North, climatologist

== See also ==
- List of cities in Tennessee
