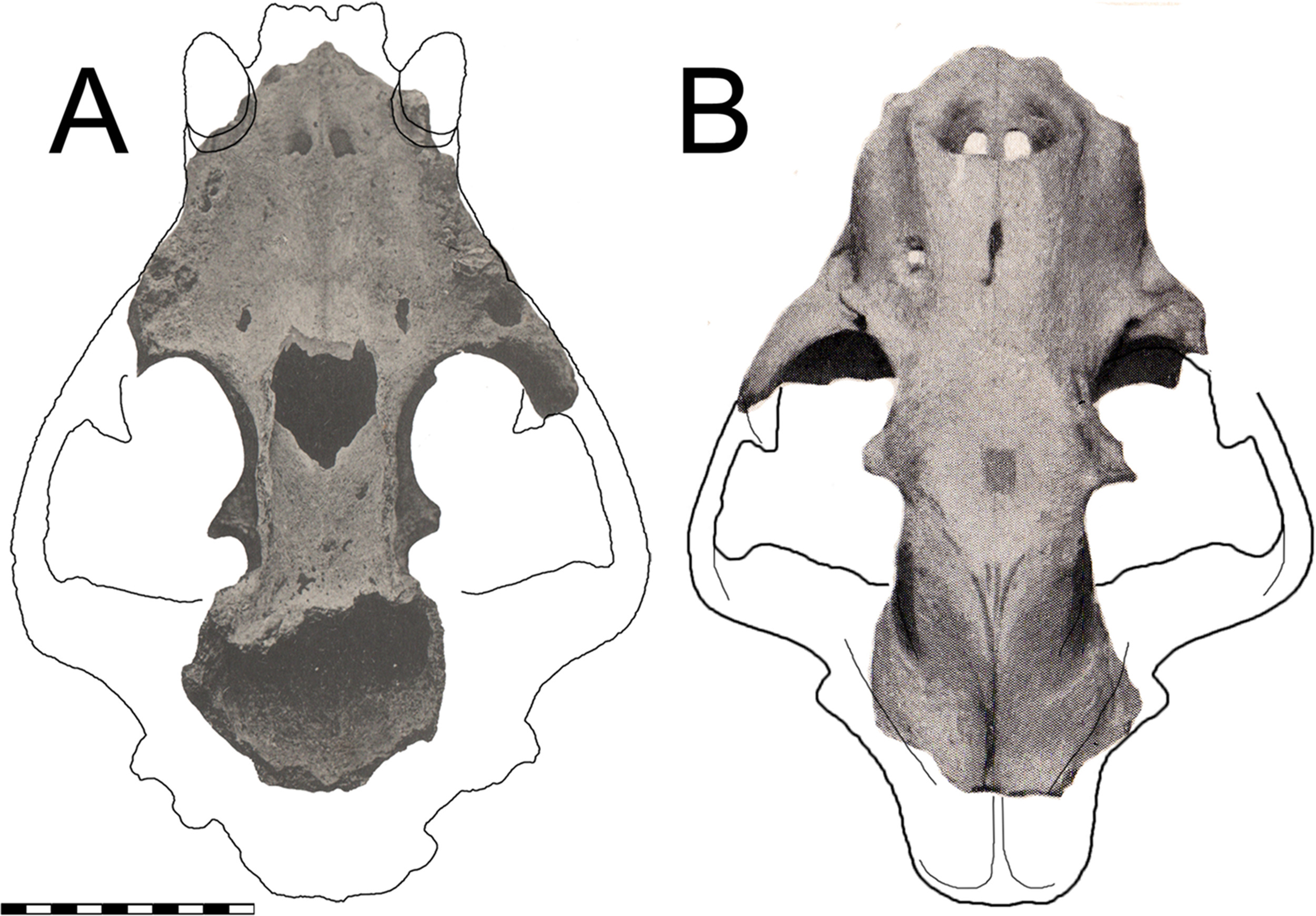
- Lost holotype skull of P. onca mesembrina

Scientific classification
- Kingdom: Animalia
- Phylum: Chordata
- Class: Mammalia
- Order: Carnivora
- Family: Felidae
- Genus: Panthera
- Species: P. onca
- Subspecies: †P. o. mesembrina

Trinomial name
- †Panthera onca mesembrina Cabrera, 1934

Synonyms
- Iemish listai Roth, 1899; Felis listai Roth, 1904

= Panthera onca mesembrina =

Panthera onca mesembrina Temporal range: Late Pleistocene ~0.016–0.012 Ma

Extinct subspecies of carnivore

Panthera onca mesembrina, also known as the Patagonian panther, is an extinct subspecies of jaguar (Panthera onca) that was endemic to southern Patagonia during the late Pleistocene epoch. It is known from several fragmentary specimens, the first of which found was in 1899 at "Cueva del Milodon" in Chile. These fossils were referred to a new genus and species "Iemish listai" by naturalist Santiago Roth, who thought they might be the bones of the mythological iemisch of Tehuelche folklore. A later expedition recovered more bones, including the skull of a large male that was described in detail by Angel Cabrera in 1934. Cabrera created a new name for the giant felid remains, Panthera onca mesembrina, after realizing that its fossils were near-identical to modern jaguars'. P. onca mesembrina's validity is disputed, with some paleontologists suggesting that it is a synonym of Panthera atrox.

The bones of P. onca mesembrina are nearly double the size of the largest living jaguars (P. onca onca), and estimates place it at over 231 kilograms (509 lb) in weight. This would make it the largest jaguar and one of the heaviest known felids. Fragments of skin have been collected from "Cueva del Milodon", showing that it was dark red with lighter, yellowish stripes on its forelimbs. Cave paintings made by indigenous peoples possibly depicting the animal have been found in the El Ceibo, which features a red coat with stripes and spots. P. onca mesembrina was carnivorous and hunted a variety of large mammals, including the ground sloth Mylodon, horse Hippidion, and camelid Lama.

== History and taxonomy ==
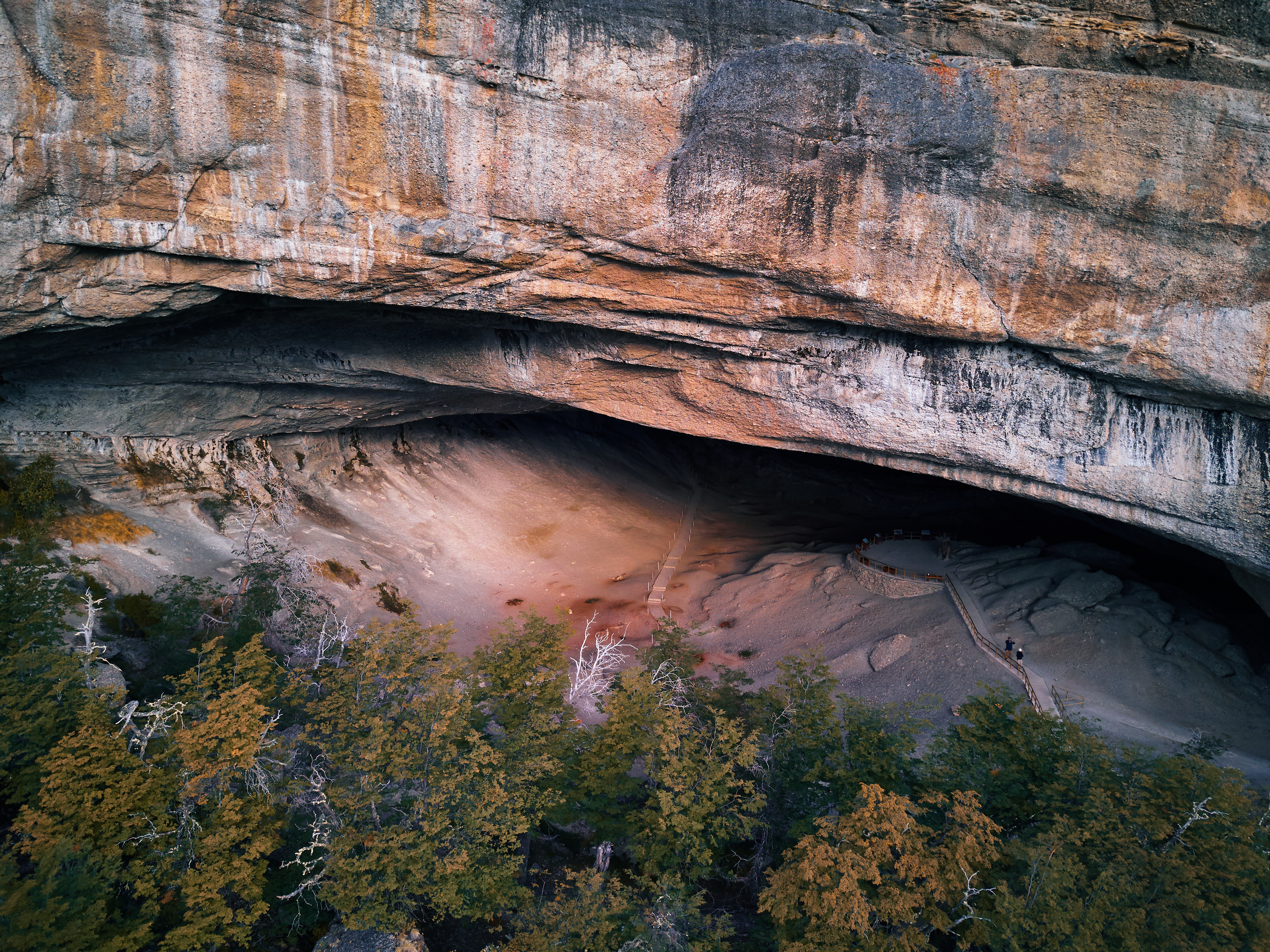
The "Cueva del Milodon" in southern Chile, where the fossils of P. onca mesembrina were found

=== Discovery and myth ===
Near his farm in the mountains of Última Esperanza Province, Chile, German explorer Hermann Eberhard came across a cave bearing fossils of the ground sloth Mylodon, leading it to be dubbed "Cueva del Milodón". These fossils date to the late Pleistocene, making them as recent as 12,000 BP, dating them to the Lujanian SALMA (South American Land Mammal Ages; a series of fauna-based geological ages). In March of 1899, Swedish adventurers Erland and Otto Nordenskjöld found a radius and ulna that they assigned to a jaguar. Later that year, German naturalist Rodolfo Hauthal and his crews found several isolated postcranial elements coming from a giant felid, which he donated to the Museo de La Plata (MLP).

At the MLP, the museum's director Santiago Roth described the fossils in 1899 as being from a novel genus and species of feline, which he designated "Iemish listai". This name references iemisch, a mythological monster of native Patagonian folklore. Roth noted that the size of the fossils fit descriptions of the myth made by Tehuelche locals and by Argentine naturalist Florentino Ameghino in the 1880s. This led Roth to believe it could still be living, which was further supported by a Tehuelche story about an extant individual that lived near Lake Buenos Aires. However, this name is now considered a nomen nudum (invalid name) as Roth based it on the legends and fossils, violating Article 72.5 of the ICZN, which stipulates that species can only be based on physical specimens or depictions. The next year, English paleontologist Arthur Smith Woodward assigned the material to Felis, noting the bones' similarities to those of extant jaguars. Later that year, Hauthal collected additional felid elements from the cave including a partial skull, two mandibles (lower jaws), other postcranial remains, and isolated portions of skin. In 1904, Roth described the remains and, following Woodward's hypothesis, abandoned the genus name "Iemish" and instead made "I. listai" a species of Felis, but argued that it was distinct from Felis onca due to its size.

=== Reanalysis ===
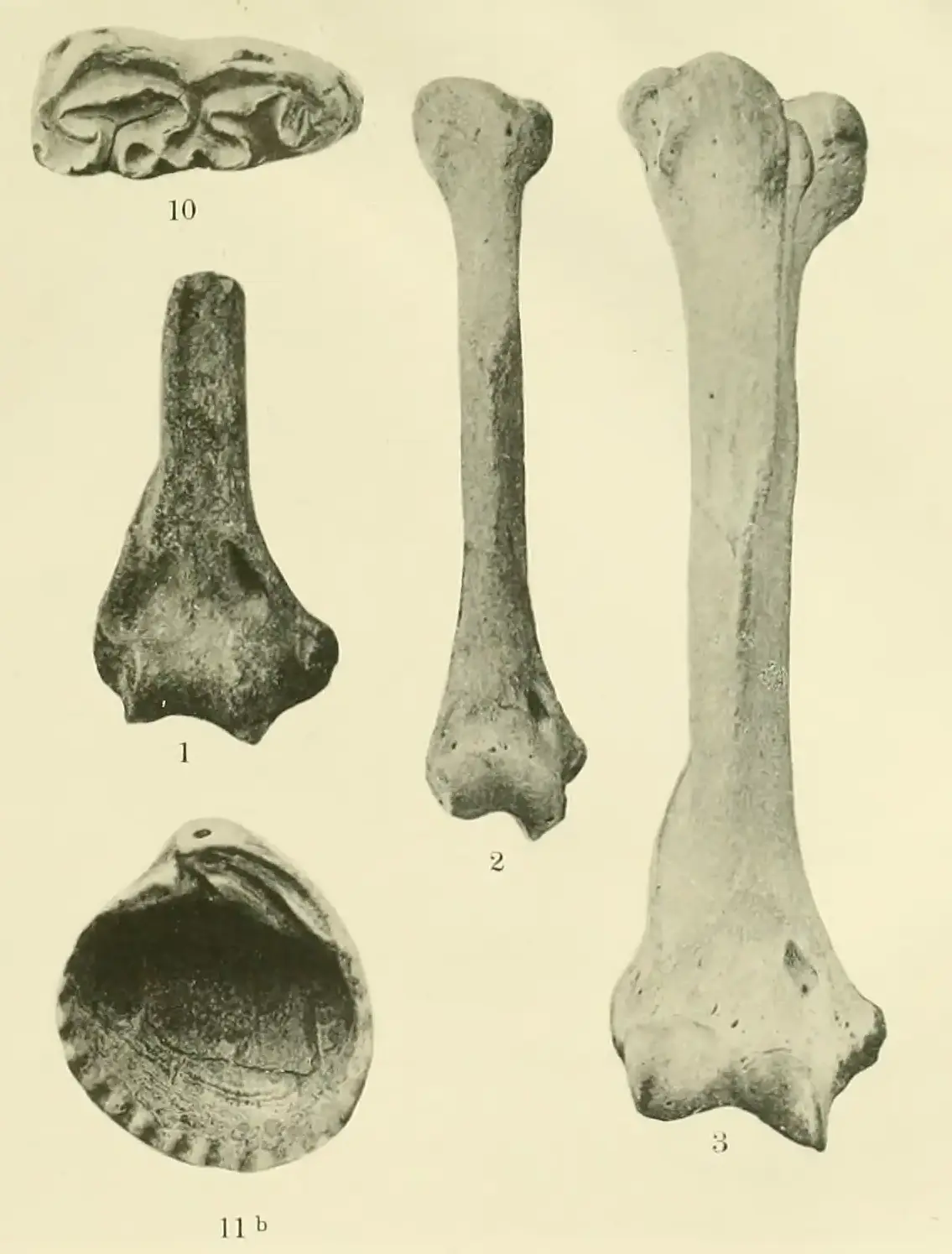
Humerus (upper arm bone) of "Iemisch" (1) compared to those of the puma (2) and lion (3)

In 1934, an analysis by Argentine paleontologist Angel Cabrera concluded that some of the bones described were from Neomylodon, a synonym of Mylodon. Furthermore, he stated that because Iemish was a title used for the mythical beast recorded by Ameghino and for the Neomylodon material, the name should be considered invalid. He went on to note that the bones were near identical to those of modern jaguars, though size was greater than that of any known jaguar. Due to "Iemish listai" being unusable, he proposed a new name, Panthera onca mesembrina, with the incomplete skull (MLP 10-90) selected as the holotype (name-bearing) specimen. The subspecies name mesembrina derives from the Greek word mesembrinos, which translates to "southern". This is due to the origin of the fossils, which come from Patagonia in southern Argentina. The holotype was subsequently lost, but both Cabrera and Roth published illustrations of it. Cabrera stated that the jaguar may have been seen or hunted by native peoples, stating that a pathology on the skull matched those characteristic of arrow wounds. More fossils were later found at the cave, including feces. Caves across Patagonia produced additional fossils, including those of juveniles and elderly individuals. In a cave near Sofia Lake, many isolated specimens from juveniles were unearthed.

A 2016 study of a mitochondrial DNA sequence obtained from bones attributed to P. onca mesembrina found that they represented those of a true jaguar, but belonged to a mitochondrial lineage highly divergent from those found in living jaguars. This supported its validity and independence from other P. onca subspecies. However, in 2017 morphological research of the holotype and other remains by Chimento et al instead referred it to the lion relative Panthera atrox. This conclusion has seen acceptance by some authors. In his 2020 thesis, researcher Nicholas Freymueller argued that this could be a case of Bergmann's rule, as traits correlated with larger body size were used to justify the synonymy in Chimento et al's study. In 2024, it was suggested that the validity of subspecific assignments on both P. o. mesembrina and the North American P. o. augusta remains unresolved, since both fossil and living jaguars show a considerable variation in morphometry.

== Description ==
Panthera onca mesembrina is the largest subspecies of P. onca, with a 2017 estimate placing its body mass at 231 kilograms (509 lb) based on the type material. This makes it not only the heaviest known jaguar by as much as 90 kilograms (200 lb), but one of the largest known felids. The trend of large body size among Pleistocene felids was likely due to a multitude of factors such as: prey size, environmental conditions of the epoch, and, for P. onca mesembrina specifically, Bergmann's Rule. A similar trend of gigantism is observed in the North American subspecies P. o. augusta, which was around 15-20% larger than modern jaguars at around 190 kilograms (420 lb). P. onca mesembrina shared the robust, stocky build of P. onca onca but to an even greater degree.

P. o. mesembrina and P. o. augusta share many similarities that are lacking in living jaguars, such as on the skull, with the presence of exposed foramina (small holes) near the nasal (nose bone) and an expanded nasal aperture (nose opening). While the skulls of extant P. onca onca individuals are short, heavy, and wider at the end of the snout, P. onca mesembrina's skull had a longer snout which tapered slightly at the premaxilla. The teeth of P. onca mesembrina were remarkably large compared to those of other Panthera species, a trait shared by living jaguars. However, few teeth are known from this subspecies. In the first molar, the paraconid (mesial cusp) is much shorter than the protoconid (distal cusp), a feature present in P. atrox and P. onca mesembrina but absent in most other pantherines.

In the postcranial anatomy, P. onca mesembrina also stands out from other P. onca in its robusticity. The humerus (upper arm bone) is thicker overall and has an expanded epicondylar crest, similar to P. atrox. The dorsal vertebrae feature short, dorsally projected processes (bony projections), characteristics absent in most jaguars.

=== Skin and coloration ===
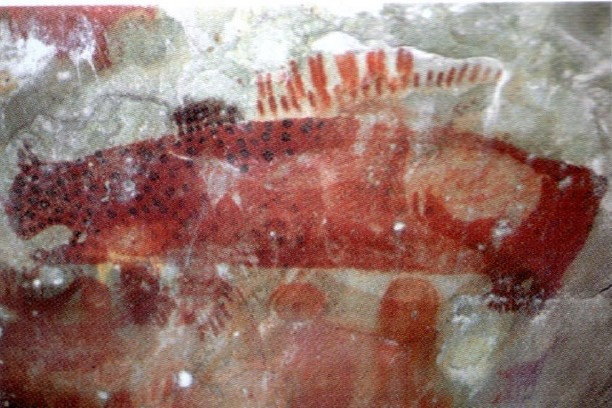
Cave painting of P. onca mesembrina in El Ceibo archaeological locality, Santa Cruz, Patagonia, Argentina.

In his 1904 description, Roth assigned pieces of skin from the face and limbs as well as a piece of leather to F. "listai", now P. onca mesembrina. These fragments had been collected from Cueva del Milodon in 1900, though a piece of Mylodon fur had earlier been misidentified as belonging to the cryptid iemisch. Roth described these portions in detail, noting that the skin from the face was reddish with hints of "shiny chestnut" while the limbs are dark overall with yellowish striping. He later called it a "cat of beautiful colors". Notably, a cave painting from El Ceibo archaeological locality in Santa Cruz Province bears an illustration matching this description. The cave, which also features art of guanacos and human handprints, features a 1.5 metres (4.9 ft) long depiction of a remarkably large, striped feline. The reasoning for the size of this painting compared to others may be due to native people revering the animal. The colors are also shown, with a reddish background, black spots, and lightly colored forelimbs. All of these characteristics coincide with the skin found at Cueva del Milodon, strongly implying that they come from the same animal.

== Paleobiology and paleoecology ==
The holotype of Panthera onca mesembrina preserved a shallow irregular pit on the lateral surface on the maxilla; this represents a puncture made by the canine of another jaguar, which healed during life. As George Simpson pointed out in 1941, all extant collected specimens with these punctures were males and no females with such scars have been found. The presence of this wound suggests that the specimen was a male based on this common social behavior between living male jaguars.

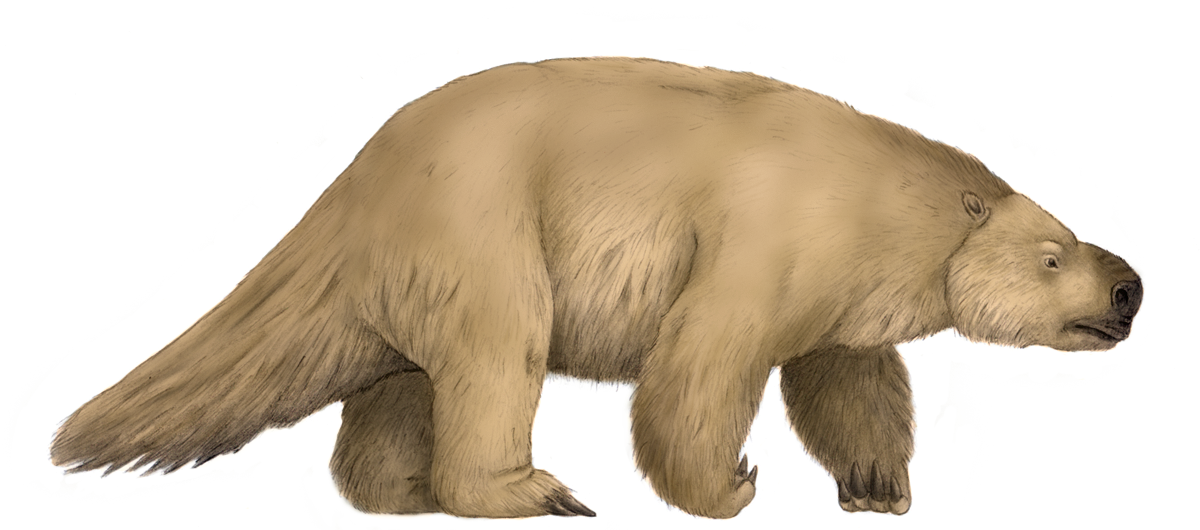
Life reconstruction of Mylodon, a prey item of P. onca mesembrina.

At Cueva del Milodon, fossils of the ground sloth Mylodon, horse Hippidion, and camelids have been found with tooth and scratch marks that match the teeth of P. onca mesembrina. Based on isotopic analyses, P. onca mesembrina preferred to hunt Hippidion and Lama, as well as juveniles of larger mammals like Mylodon. Evidence from dens of P. onca mesembrina backs this, as Lama and Hippidion fossils were more common than other herbivores. The majority of the fossils found were limb elements, a circumstance that happens with living felines' burrows and cave where food is taken and consumed. Though P. onca mesembrina is one of four known carnivores in the cave, its fossils are more common and better preserved, whereas species like Smilodon populator are represented by a handful of fossils. Modern jaguars and cougars are able to drag their kills long distances, which P. onca mesembrina was likely capable of as well. The discovery of isolated herbivore bones in largely carnivore-occupied dens in other caves supports this as they were likely kills taken to be eaten. Cueva del Milodon, however, was a frequent nest of Mylodons based on the occurrence of juvenile and newborn Mylodon individuals. It is possible that it was a recurring hunting spot for P. onca mesembrina due to this. Some of the prey items reached great sizes, such as a skull from a 3–4 metres (9.8–13.1 ft) long Mylodon that bears several bite marks. Coprolites containing Mylodon dermal ossicles were found there, which were likely defecated by P. onca mesembrina.

The majority of sites where P. onca mesembrina has been found in Argentina and Chile are very open and arid, contrasting to the lush rainforest habitats of modern jaguars. This conclusion is backed by their diets, with P. onca mesembrina hunting grazing animals whereas living jaguars prefer browsers like tapirs, anteaters, and peccaries. Fossils of P. onca mesembrina have been reported from eight sites according to Chimento et al (2017) and Paunero et al (2017), all of which are in southern Argentina and Chile. Cueva del Milodon is the southernmost site known to be occupied by jaguars. This region is extremely cold, with temperatures dropping as low as −16 °C (3 °F).

== See also ==
- Panthera gombaszogensis
