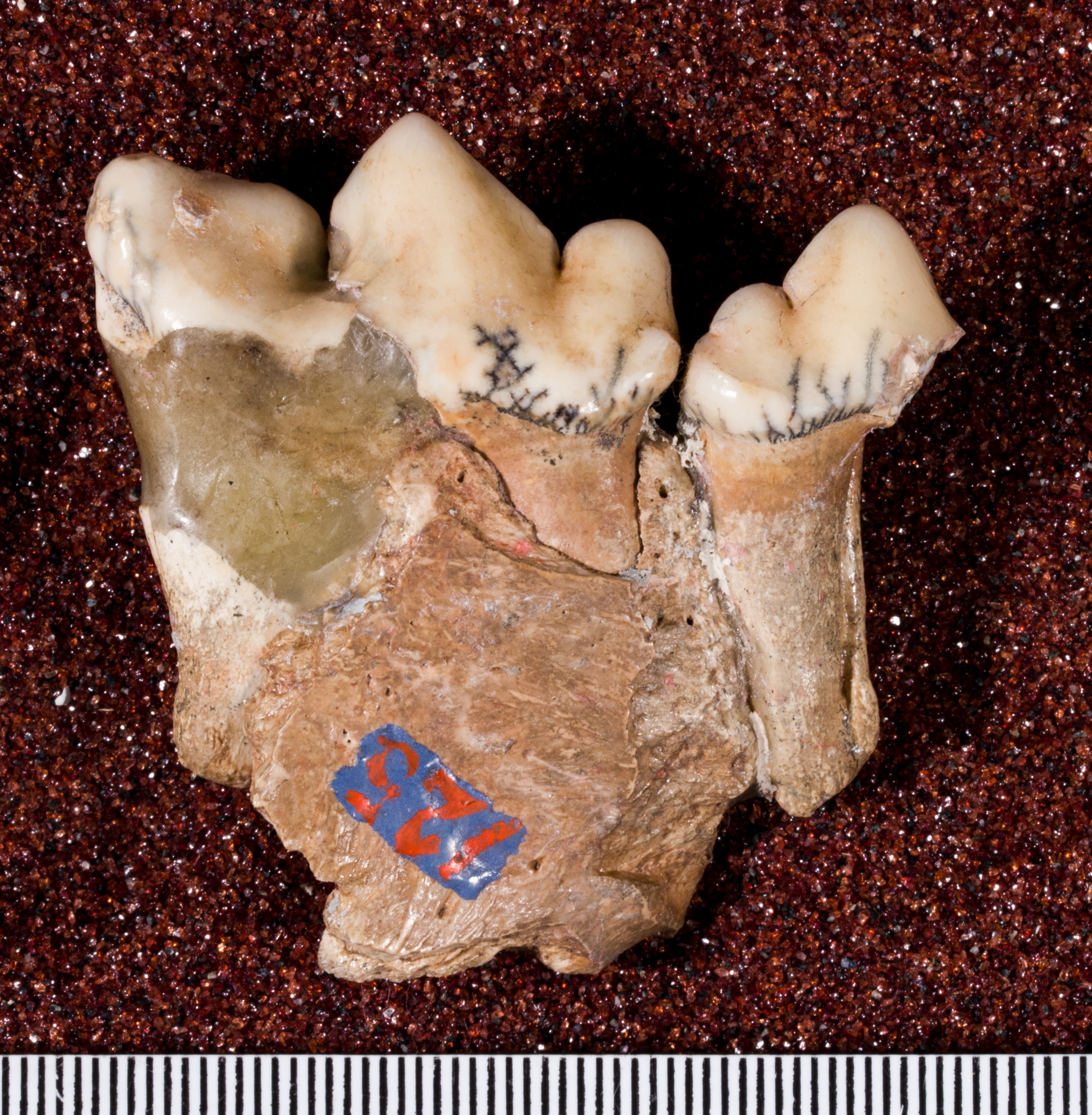
- USNM V 125, the syntype of P. onca augusta

Scientific classification
- Kingdom: Animalia
- Phylum: Chordata
- Class: Mammalia
- Order: Carnivora
- Family: Felidae
- Genus: Panthera
- Species: P. onca
- Subspecies: †P. o. augusta

Trinomial name
- †Panthera onca augusta (Leidy, 1872)

Synonyms
- Felis augustus Leidy, 1872; Felis veronis Hay, 1919; Panthera augusta (Leidy, 1872); Puma concolor augusta (Leidy, 1872)

= Panthera onca augusta =

Panthera onca augusta Temporal range: Middle Pleistocene–Late Pleistocene

Extinct subspecies of jaguar

Panthera onca augusta is an extinct subspecies of the jaguar that was endemic to North America from Middle to Late Pleistocene epoch.

== History and naming ==
=== Initial finds ===
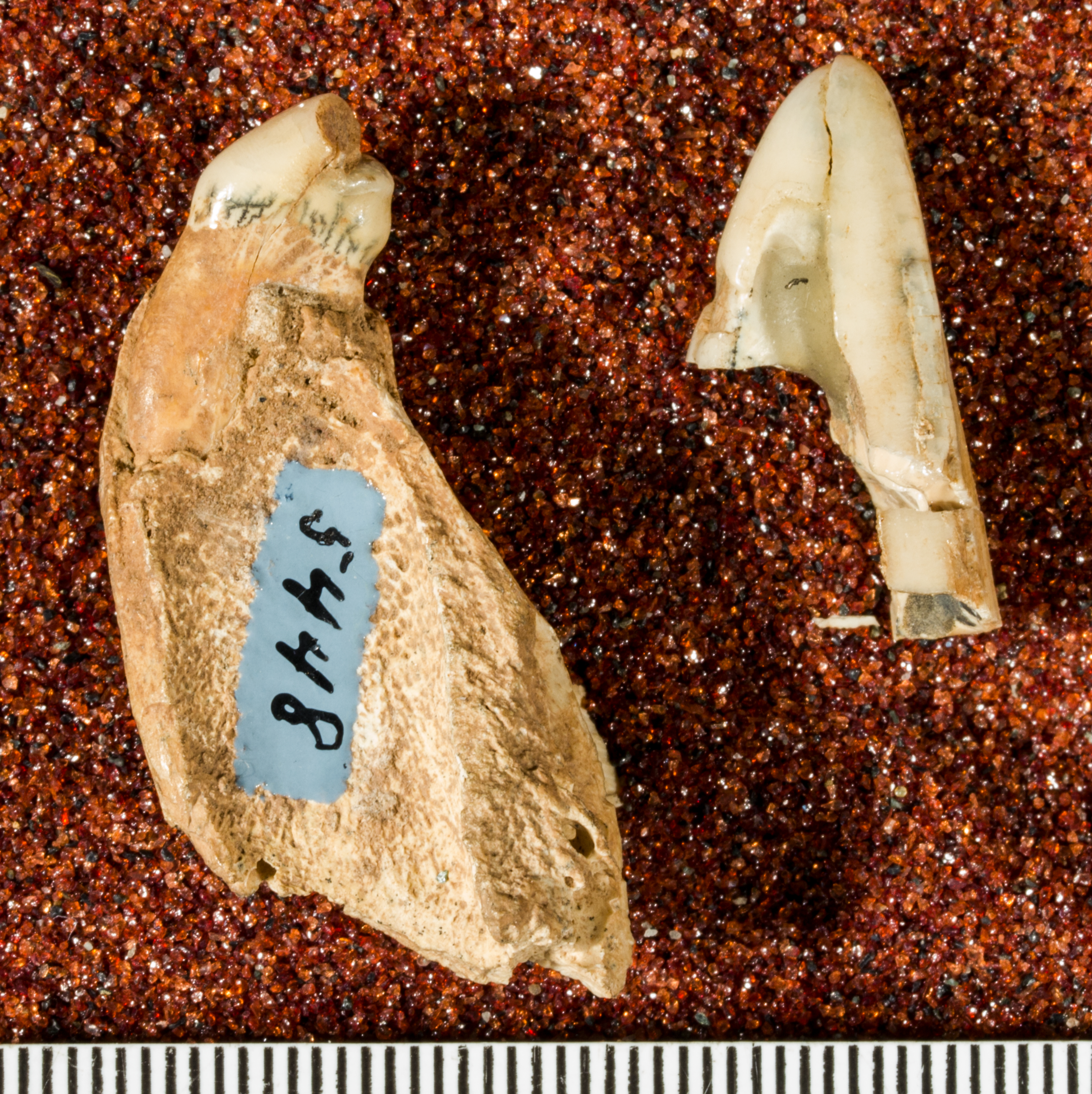
USNM V 5448, the paratype of P. onca augusta

The first published fossils were found on the Loup Fork of the Platte River in Nebraska, initially misinterpreted as the Niobrara River, by Ferdinand Vandeveer Hayden in 1857. Hayden sent the fossils to Joseph Leidy at the Academy of Natural Sciences in Philadelphia, who named Felis augustus in 1872 based on these remains. The syntype (USNM V 125) consisted of a partial left maxilla (upper jaw) associated with the third and fourth premolar, and the paratype (USNM V 5448) consisted of a partial right premaxilla (incisive bone) associated with the second incisor and the first and last alveoli.

Leidy further tentatively assigned a distal humerus (upper arm) also found by Hayden to this taxon, though he expressed uncertainty in his referral due to the specimen not being found in close proximity to the type locality. In 1951, McCrady and colleagues examined this humerus (USNM V 147) and suggested that it likely belongs to either Panthera atrox or Smilodon fatalis. In 1993, Seymour claimed that the specimen does belong to a jaguar, though did not comment on its subspecific validity. The Smithsonian Institution has since reclassified this fossil as that of the short-faced bear Arctodus pristinus. Leidy also mistakenly believed the fossils were from the Pliocene, but subsequent studies suggested that the type specimen is actually from the Pleistocene. While Guilday and McGinnis suggested that the specimen can be dated to the Late Pleistocene in 1972, subsequent studies have suggested that it comes from the Middle Pleistocene.

=== Subsequent research ===
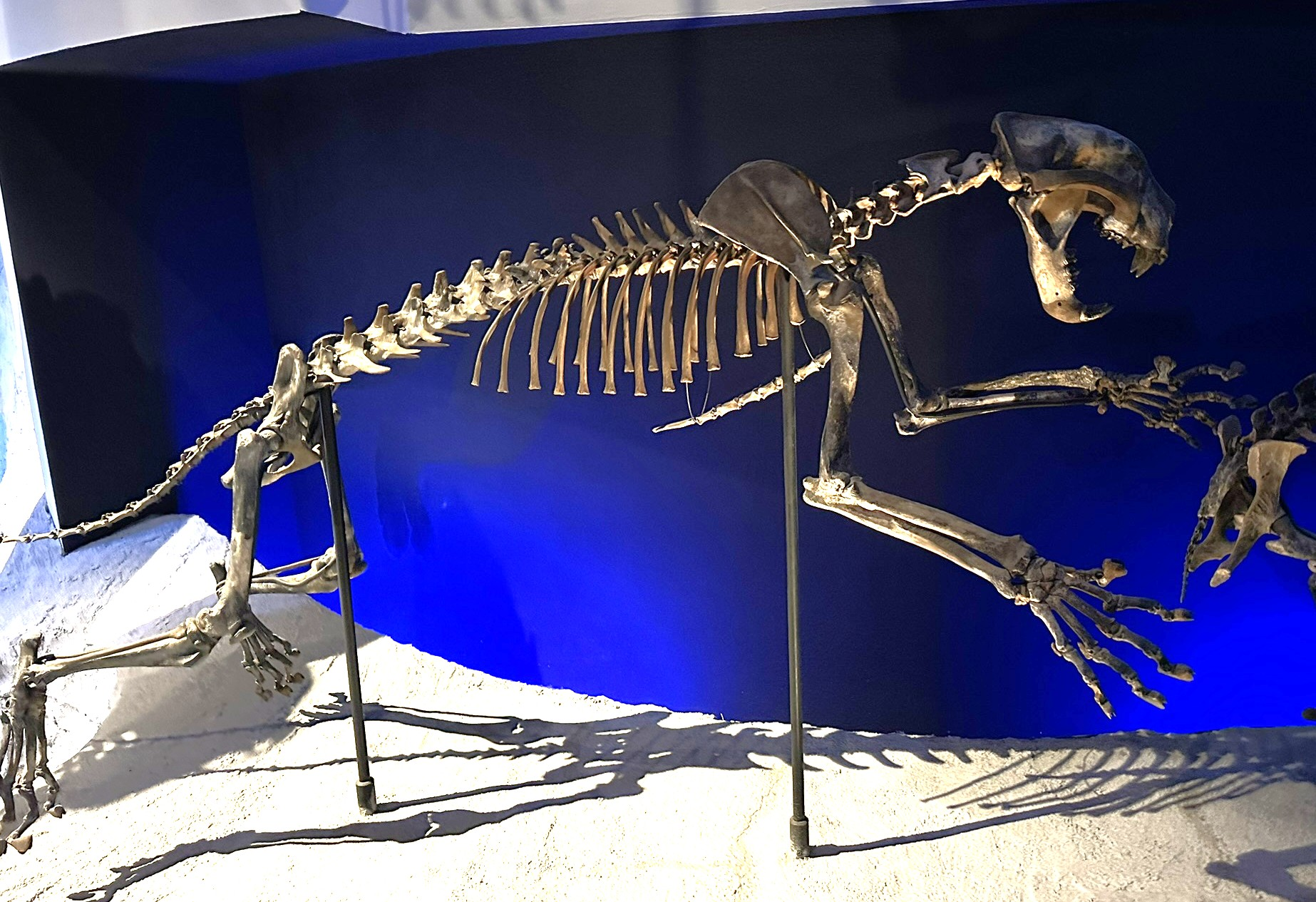
Reconstructed skeleton, Florida Museum of Natural History

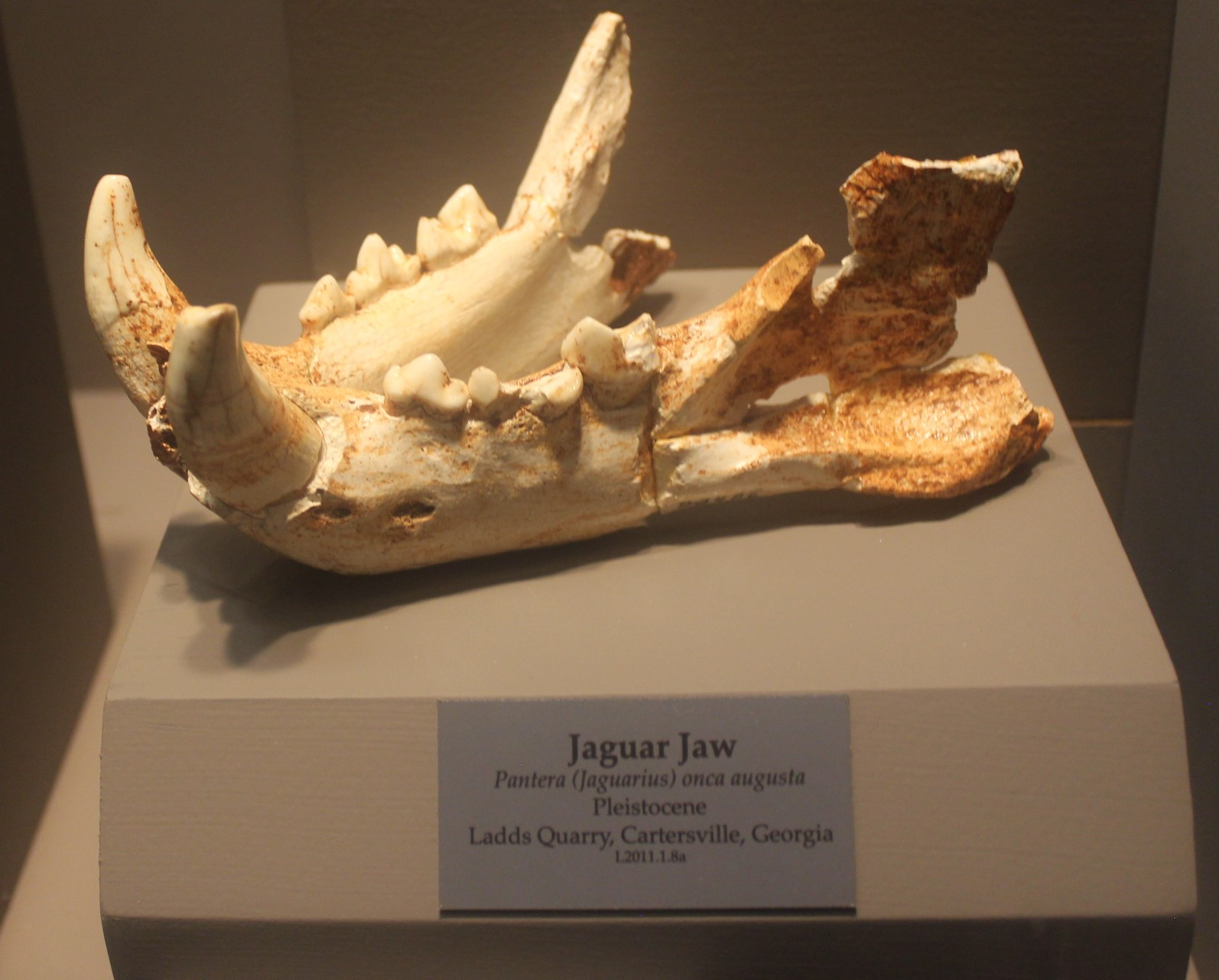
Mandible at the Tellus Science Museum

In 1919, Oliver Perry Hay described a left canine from Vero, Florida that he named Felis veronis, though it is now seen as a synonym of P. onca augusta. In 1929, George Simpson referred several teeth from Seminole Field, Florida to F. veronis and the same year a right mandible and several teeth from Melbourne, Florida were collected by Dr. J. W. Gidley. All material found has been referred to P. onca augusta, the mandible notably was the first complete one found of the taxon. Yet another discovery came in 1938, with the discovery of 2 fragmentary postcranial skeletons probably belonging to P. onca augusta in Cumberland Cave, Maryland, intermingled with that of a puma.

The most productive discoveries outside of California started since 1939 and 1940, with the discoveries of footprints and several fossils from the Craighead Caverns, Tennessee during these years; in 1941, Simpson identified them as jaguar fossils and considered F. augustus as a subspecies of the former, first proposing the trinomial name P. onca augusta. Two well-preserved skeletons found in 1944 from the Salt River Cave, Tennessee, had 2 partial skulls and many axial elements that clearly demonstrated this taxon's clear differences with other taxa. McCrady and colleagues referred to this taxon as P. augusta based on these differences in 1951, suggesting that it is a separate species from the jaguar. In 1972, Guilday and McGinnis followed the combination by Simpson (1941), which has since been followed by some subsequent studies, while other authors remained that neither combination is more optimal than the other. Many more fossils were later collected by the American Museum of Natural History at Craighead Caverns, including several mandibles and partial craniums.

== Paleobiology and paleoecology ==
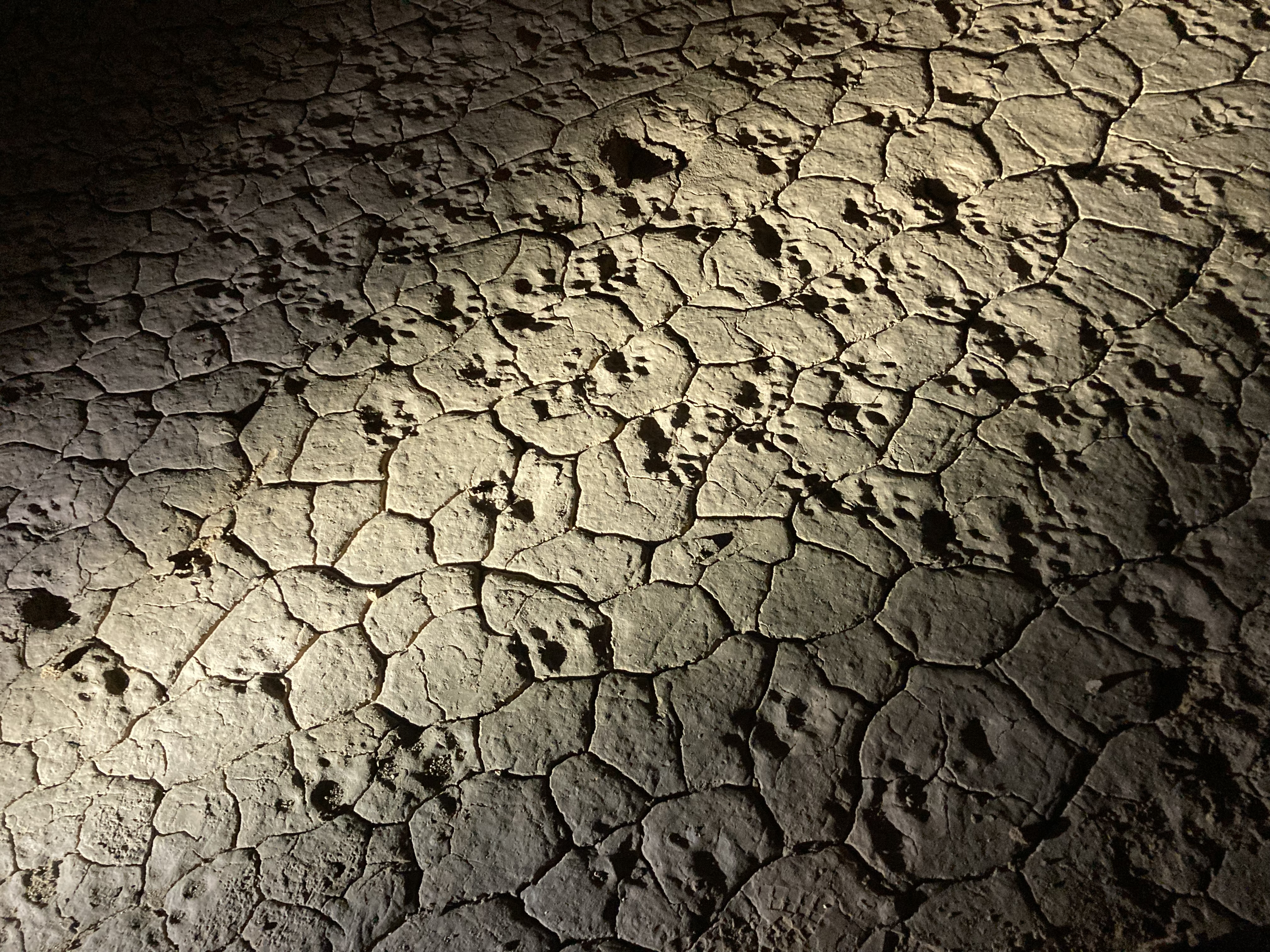
Probable footprints preserved within Blue Spring Cave

Fossils referable to P. onca augusta have been found in various parts of the United States, including Oregon and, most notably, the La Brea Tar Pits of California. P. onca augusta is most frequently found in Florida’s localities, as there are many fossil-bearing sites from the Pleistocene throughout Florida. A possible specimen of P. onca augusta is also known from Georgia, dated to 15,630-15,300 calibrated years BP, and mitogenomic analysis suggests that the specimen certainly belongs to P. onca, though its definitive subspecific assignment remains unresolved. In 2020, a partial mandible was referred to P. onca augusta from Chapala, Mexico, extending the range south to southwestern Mexico. Farther south, possible fossilised remains of this taxon have been reported in the same year as either Puma concolor augusta or P. onca augusta from the Extinction Cave, Belize.

P. onca augusta was 15-20% larger than most jaguar populations. During the middle to late Irvingtonian (late Early?-Middle Pleistocene), this subspecies may have averaged 104.8–106.1 kg (231–234 lb), with the largest individual weighing 128.4–128.9 kg (283–284 lb), but the subspecies went through a downsize with the Rancholabrean (late Middle-Late Pleistocene) populations weighing 88–92.9 kg (194–205 lb), smaller than the Irvingtonian populations. It has been suggested that the Late Pleistocene extinction event caused the loss of larger potential prey to an extent that the modern jaguar prefer to prey on relatively small species, and that this reduction in size among jaguars, especially having shorter metapodials, is an adaptation to hunt in closed habitats like forests.

== See also ==
- Panthera onca mesembrina
- Panthera gombaszogensis
