= Ahuizotl =

Ahuizotl may refer to:

- Ahuitzotl, also transcribed Ahuizotl, an Aztec emperor (r. 1486–1502)
- Ahuizotl (mythology), a Mesoamerican mythological creature
- Ahuizotl (Dungeons & Dragons), a creature from Dungeons & Dragons
- Ahuizotl, a My Little Pony: Friendship Is Magic character
