= Craighead Caverns =

Cave system in Tennessee, United States

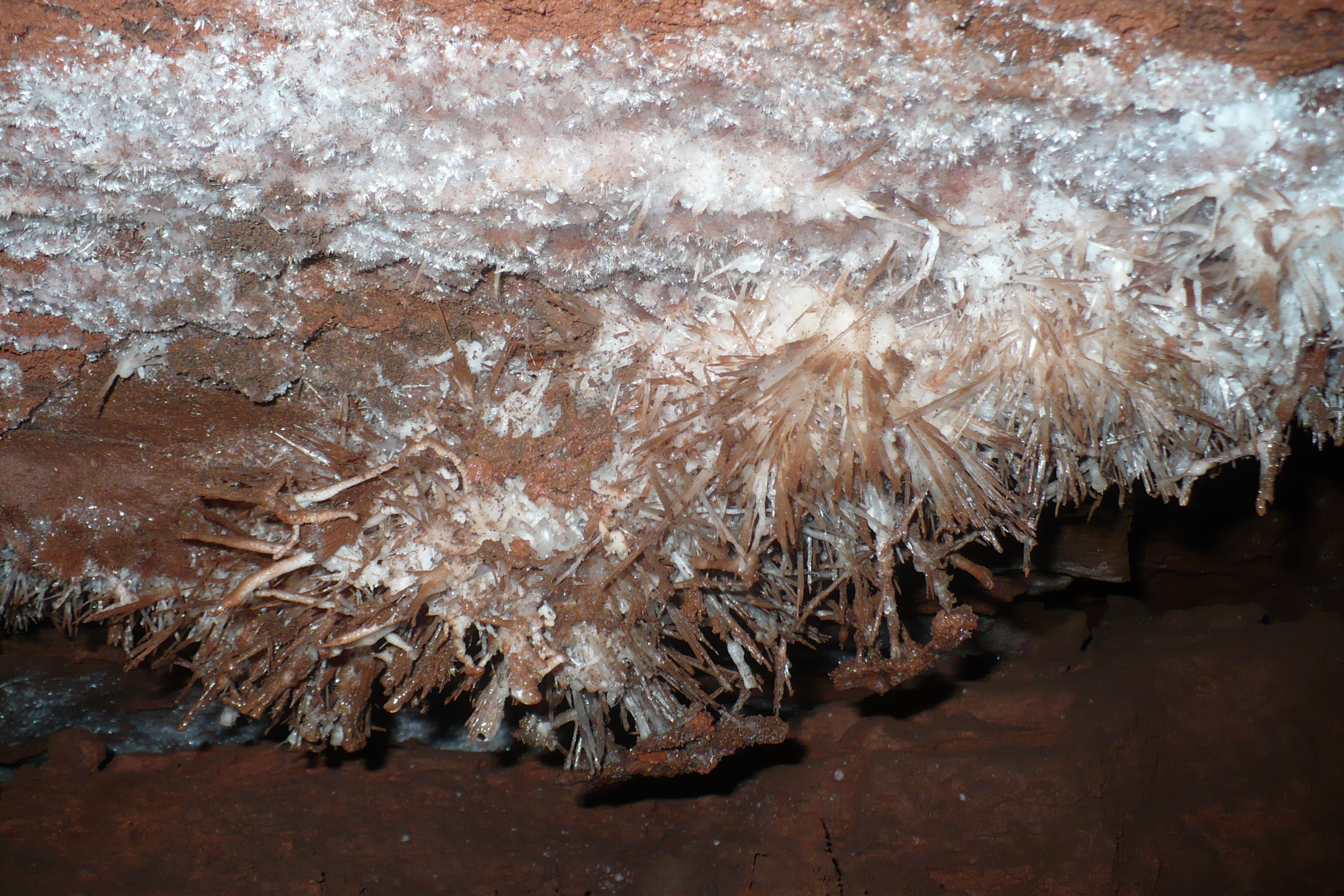
- Anthodite formation

- Location within Tennessee Location within the United States
- Location: Sweetwater, Tennessee
- Coordinates: 35°32′08″N 84°25′52″W
- Designated: 1974
- Website: Official website

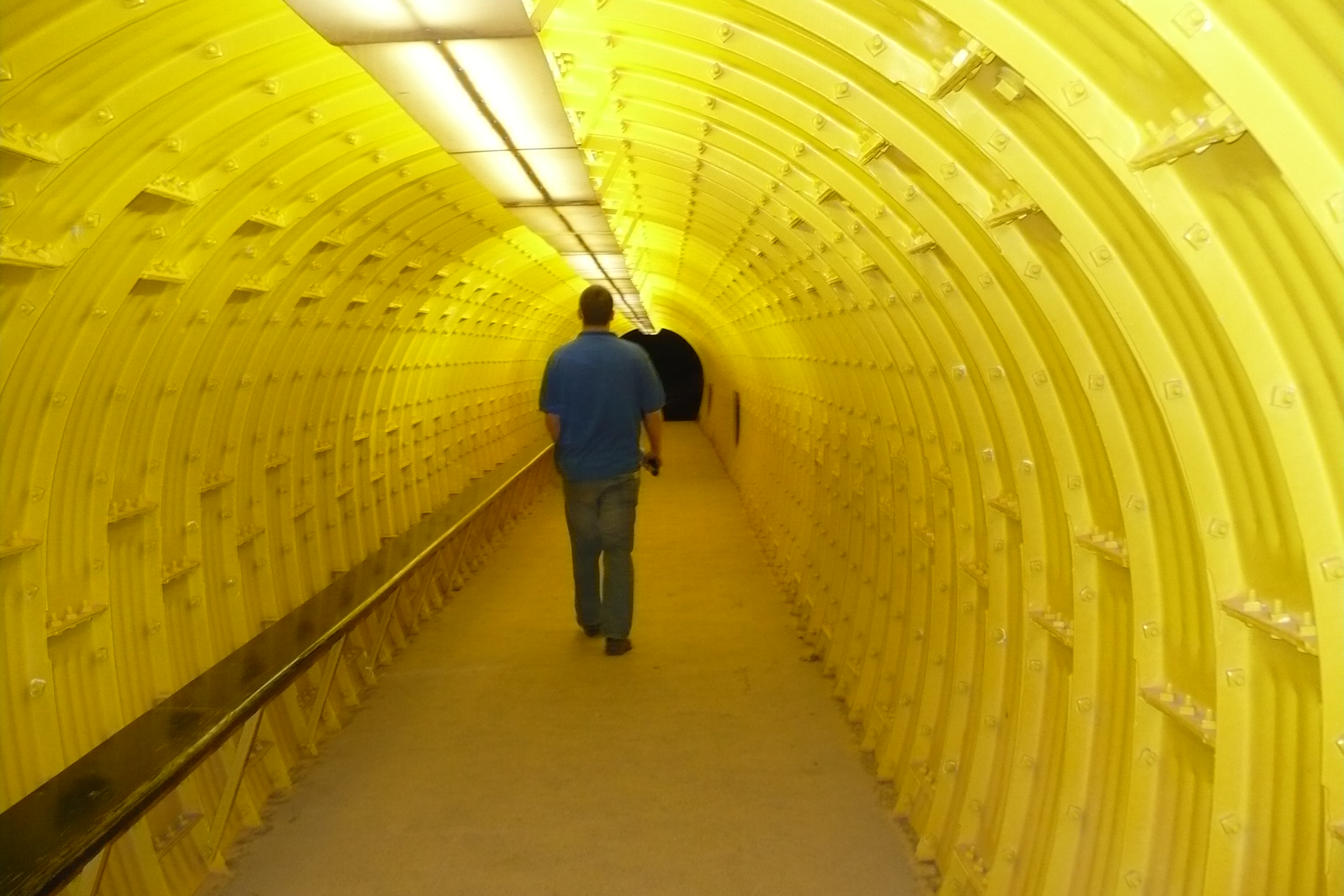
Entrance to cavern

Craighead Caverns is an extensive cave system located in between Sweetwater and Madisonville, Tennessee. It is best known for containing the United States' largest and the world's second largest non-subglacial underground lake, The Lost Sea. In addition to the lake, the caverns contain an abundance of crystal clusters called anthodites, stalactites, stalagmites, and a waterfall.

== History ==
Located in the foothills of the Great Smoky Mountains, the caverns are named after their former owner, a Cherokee Native American, Chief Craighead. The caverns were used by the Cherokee as a meeting place for their councils.

During the American Civil War, the caves were mined by Confederate soldiers for saltpeter, a commodity necessary to the manufacture of gunpowder. The major cave and lake area was also used as a hideout for moonshiners, especially during the Prohibition era.

In 1939, explorers found the fossilized remains of a Pleistocene jaguar. The persons who made the discovery were cave guides Jack Kyker and Clarence Hicks, who were exploring in the cave during their off hours. They reported their find to Dr. W. J. Cameron and W. E. Michael of Sweetwater, who then owned the cave.

The owners submitted the bones to the American Museum of Natural History in New York City, where they were identified as bones of a very large jaguar and an elk fawn. George Gaylord Simpson, a vertebrate paleontologist at the museum, subsequently visited Craighead Caverns in May 1940. During his visit, he recovered additional jaguar bones and made casts of several jaguar footprints in the mud floor of the cave. His excavation and findings are reported in American Museum Novitates, No. 1131 (August 6, 1941) on pages 1–12. The report includes photographs of the bones and footprints. Simpson referred the fossils to the large Panthera onca augusta, at that time the remains from Craighead Caverns were some of the best known of the subspecies.

A mushroom farm was operated in the cave from 1939 to 1940. The manure for this operation was supplied from Fort Oglethorpe, where many horses were stabled. The mushroom beds were located in the Big Room, a few hundred feet northeast of the historic entrance. In 1947, a wooden dance floor was built in this same area of the cave, and a nightclub, known as the "Cavern Tavern", was operated there.

Craighead Caverns was added to the National Park Service list of National Natural Landmarks in 1974.

== The Lost Sea ==
Visitor center

The lake was discovered in 1905 by a thirteen-year-old boy named Ben Sands. He was said to often play in the cave and, when he happened upon a small opening, crawled through. The room was so large he was unable to see the ends of the space with his lantern, so he threw balls of mud in all directions and heard splashes. When he went back home and told people of his discovery, they were hesitant to believe him. By the time Ben convinced his father to go back down with him to explore further, the water level had risen, hiding the cave entrance from them. It was rediscovered several years later by local explorers.

The visible surface of the lake measures 800 feet (240 m) long and 220 feet (67 m) wide (4.5 acres (1.8 ha)) at normal "full" capacity. Cave divers have explored several rooms that are completely filled with water, without reaching the end of the cave. This exploration was conducted in the 1970s.

For many years The Lost Sea was considered the world's largest underground lake; it is the largest in the United States and is still recognized as the world's second-largest, non-subglacial underground lake, after Dragon's Breath Cave, in Namibia.

Commercial boat tours of the lake are still given and for many people are the highlight of the cave tour. In times of extreme drought (such as 2007–08), the lake recedes significantly. Tour management had to extend the walkway and the boat dock in order to continue the boat tours. At the height of the drought, management of the Lost Sea said that the water level in the lake dropped 28 feet below its normal level. At such times visitors see a much larger cavern above the lake surface.

The sea was featured on CBS's America Wonders series.
