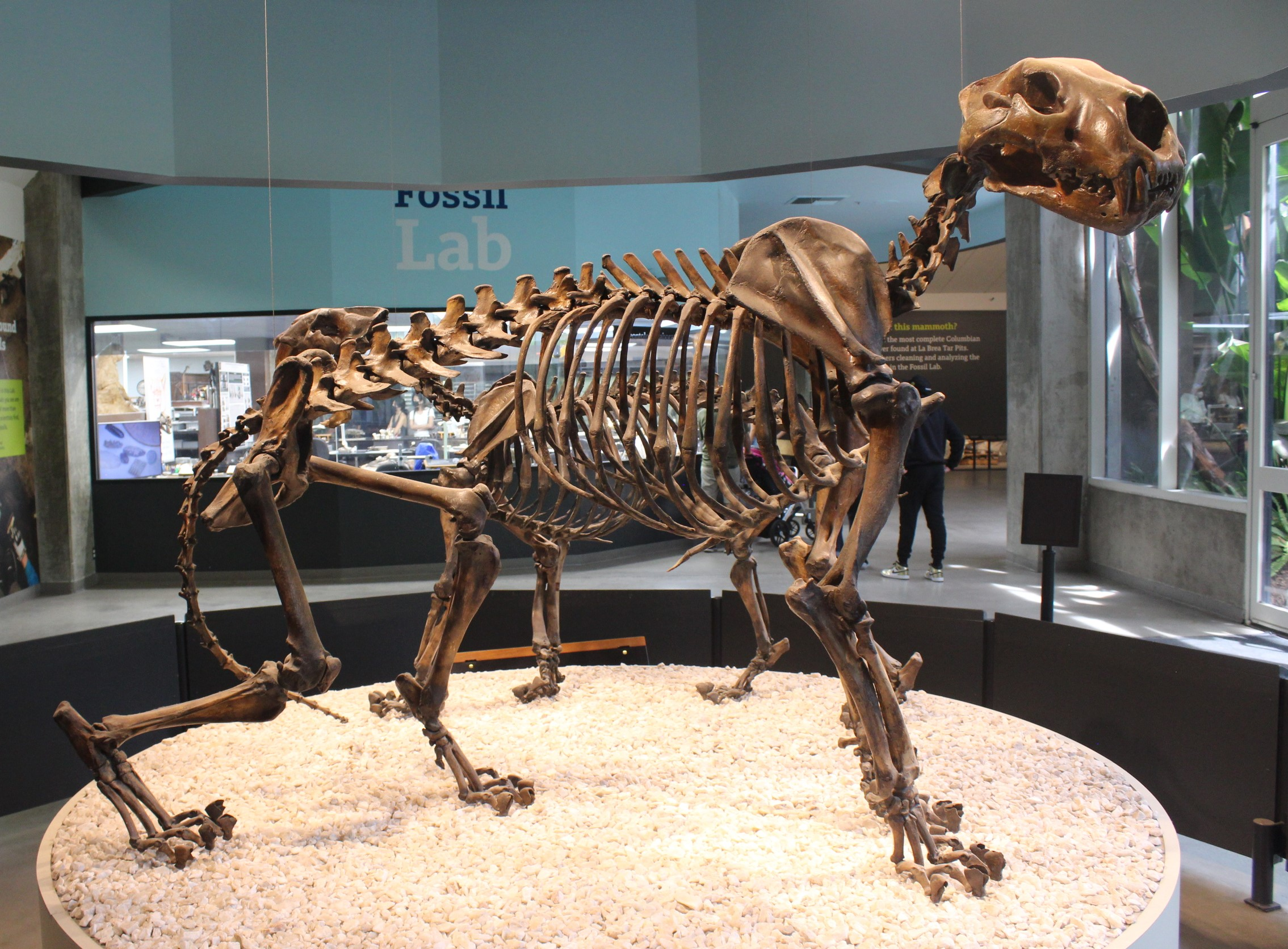
- Skeleton from the La Brea tar pits at the George C. Page Museum

Scientific classification
- Kingdom: Animalia
- Phylum: Chordata
- Class: Mammalia
- Order: Carnivora
- Family: Felidae
- Genus: Panthera
- Species: †P. atrox

Binomial name
- †Panthera atrox (Leidy, 1853)
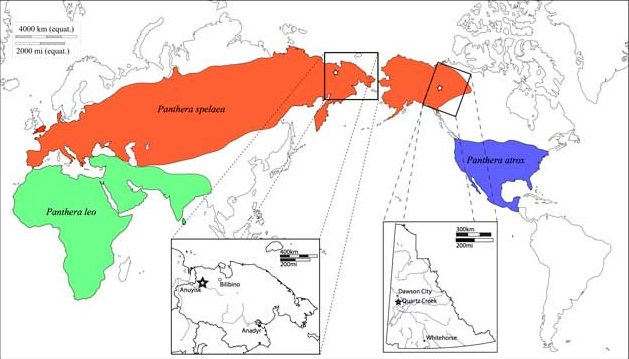
- The maximal range of lions: red indicates Panthera spelaea, blue Panthera atrox, and green Panthera leo. Range is outdated as it does not include some areas now known to be inhabited by P. spelaea, such as Japan.

Synonyms
- Felis imperialis Leidy, 1878; Iemish listai? Roth, 1899; Felis atrox bebbi Merriam, 1909; Felis atrox "alaskensis" Scott, 1930; Felis onca mesembrina? Cabrera, 1934; Panthera onca mesembrina? (Cabrera, 1934)

= American lion =

American lion Temporal range: Late Pleistocene,0.129–0.0131 Ma

Extinct species of carnivore

The American lion (Panthera atrox (/ˈpænθərə ˈætrɒks/), with the species name meaning "savage" or "cruel", also called the North American lion) is an extinct pantherine cat native to North America during the Late Pleistocene from around 129,000 to 13,100 years ago. Genetic evidence suggests that its closest living relative is the lion (Panthera leo), with the American lion representing an offshoot from the lineage of the largely Eurasian cave lion (Panthera spelaea), from which it is suggested to have split around 165,000 years ago. Its fossils have been found across North America, from Canada to Mexico. It was about 25% larger than the modern lion, making it one of the largest known felids to ever exist, and a dominant apex predator in North American ecosystems, alongside the sabertooth cats Smilodon and Homotherium. It has been suggested, like modern lions, they were social animals, although this is not known for sure. Unlike modern lions, American lions may have been a diurnal predator.

The American lion became extinct as part of the end-Pleistocene extinction event along with most other large animals across the Americas. The extinctions followed human arrival in the Americas. Proposed factors in its extinction include climatic change reducing viable habitat, as well as human hunting of herbivore prey causing a trophic cascade.

== History and taxonomy ==
=== Initial discovery and North American fossils ===
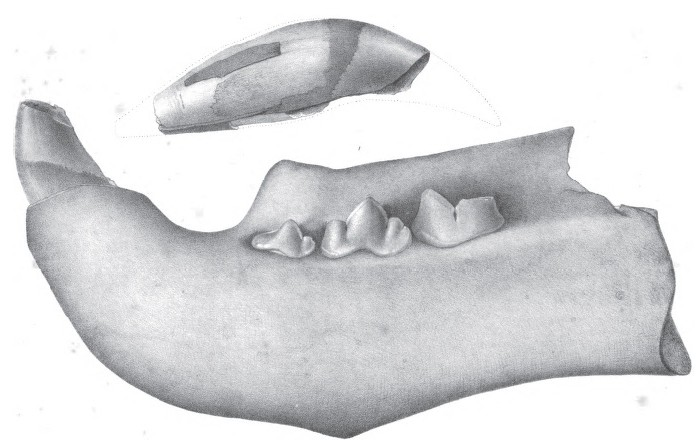
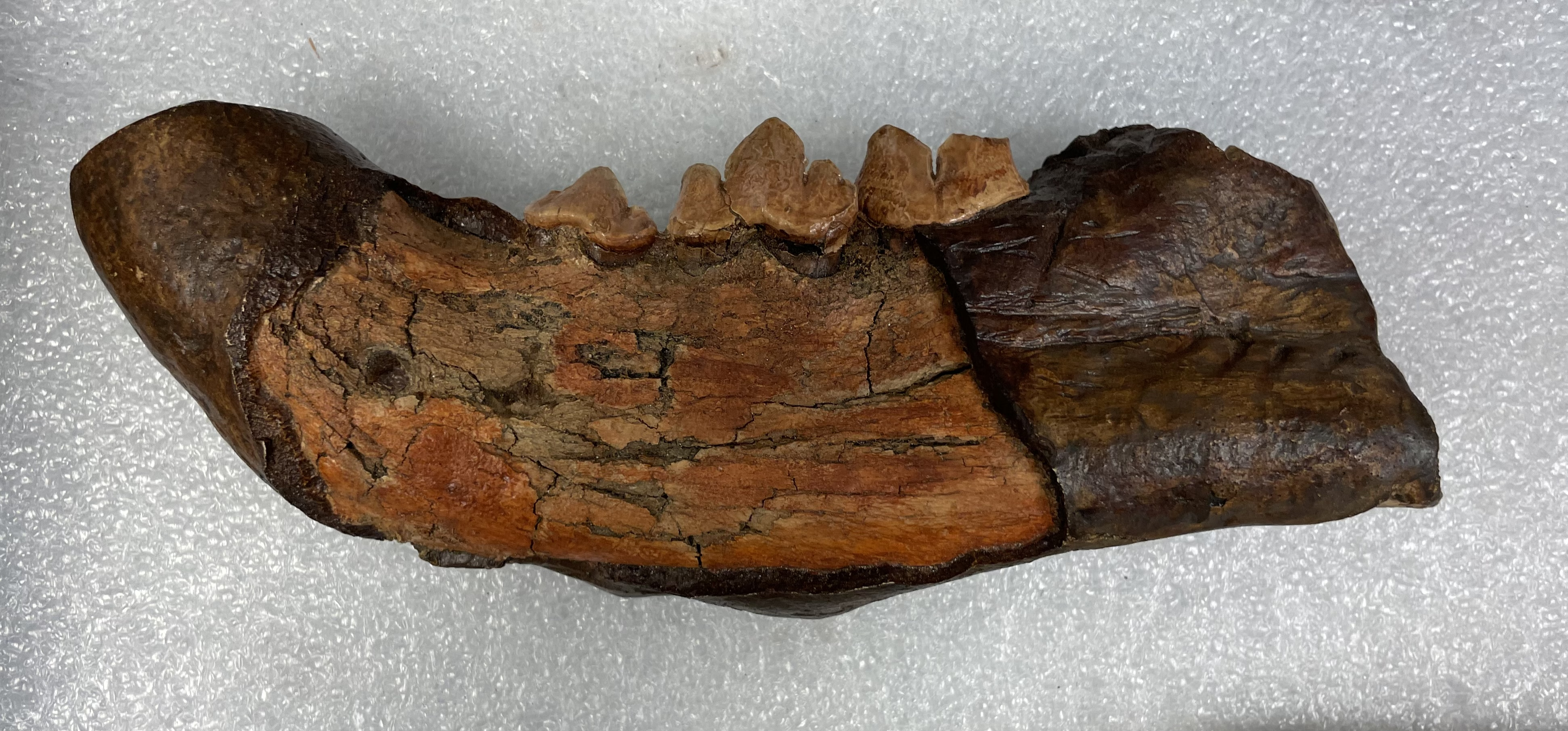
1852 illustration and cast of the holotype specimen

The first specimen now assigned to Panthera atrox was collected in the 1830s by William Henry Huntington, Esq., who announced his discovery to the American Philosophical Society on April 1, 1836 and placed it with other fossils from Huntington's collection in the Academy of Natural Sciences in Philadelphia. The specimen had been collected in ravines in Natchez, Mississippi that were dated to the Pleistocene; the specimen consisted only of a partial left mandible with three molars and a partial canine. The fossils did not get a proper description until 1853 when Joseph Leidy named the fragmentary specimen (ANSP 12546) Felis atrox ("savage cat"). Leidy named another species in 1873, Felis imperialis, based on a mandible fragment from Pleistocene gravels in Livermore Valley, California. F. imperialis however is considered a junior synonym of Panthera atrox. A replica of the jaw of the first American lion specimen to be discovered can be seen in the hand of a statue of famous paleontologist Joseph Leidy, currently standing outside the Academy of Natural Sciences in Philadelphia.

Few additional discoveries came until 1907, when the American Museum of Natural History and College, Alaska collected several Panthera atrox skulls in a locality originally found in 1803 by gold miners in Kotzebue, Alaska. The skulls were referred to a new subspecies of Felis (Panthera) atrox in 1930, Felis atrox "alaskensis". Despite this, the species did not get a proper description and is now seen as a nomen nudum synonymous with Panthera atrox. Further south in Rancho La Brea, California, a large felid skull was excavated and later described in 1909 by John C. Merriam, who referred it to a new subspecies of Felis atrox, Felis atrox bebbi. The subspecies is synonymous with Panthera atrox.

Throughout the early to mid 1900s, dozens of fossils of Panthera atrox were excavated at La Brea, including many postcranial elements and associated skeletons. The fossils were described by Merriam & Stock in detail in 1932, who synonymized many previously named taxa with Felis atrox. At least 80 individuals are known from La Brea Tar Pits and the fossils define the subspecies, giving a comprehensive view of the taxon. It was not until 1941 that George Simpson moved Felis atrox to Panthera, believing that it was a subspecies of jaguar. Simpson also referred several fossils from central Mexico, even as far south as Chiapas, as well as Nebraska and other regions of the western US, to P. atrox. 1971 witnessed the description of fragmentary remains from Alberta, Canada that extended P. atrox's range north. In 2009, an entrapment site at Natural Trap Cave, Wyoming was briefly described and is the second most productive Panthera atrox-bearing fossil site. It most importantly contains well-preserved mitochondrial DNA of many partial skeletons.

=== Panthera onca mesembrina and possible South American material ===
In the 1890s in the "Cueva del Milodón" in southern Chile, fossil collector Rodolfo Hauthal collected a fragmentary postcranial skeleton of a large felid that he sent to Santiago Roth. Roth described them as a new genus and species of felid, "Iemish listai" in 1899. However, the name is considered a nomen nudum. In 1904, Roth reassessed the phylogenetic affinities of "Iemish" and named it Felis listai and referred several cranial and fragmentary postcranial elements to the taxon. Notably, several mandibles, a partial skull, and pieces of skin were some of the specimens referred. In 1934, Felis onca mesembrina was named by Angel Cabrera based on that partial skull from "Cueva del Milodón" and the other material from the site was referred to it. The skull (MLP 10-90) was lost, and was only illustrated by Cabrera.

Further material, including feces and mandibles, was referred to as F. onca mesembrina from Tierra del Fuego, Argentina and other southern sites in Chile.

In 2016, the subspecies was referred to Panthera onca in a genetic study, which supported its identity as a subspecies of jaguar. Later in 2017, one study suggested that P. onca mesembrina represents a junior synonym of Panthera atrox based on morphological similarities, though other researchers disagreed with this identification.

=== Evolution ===
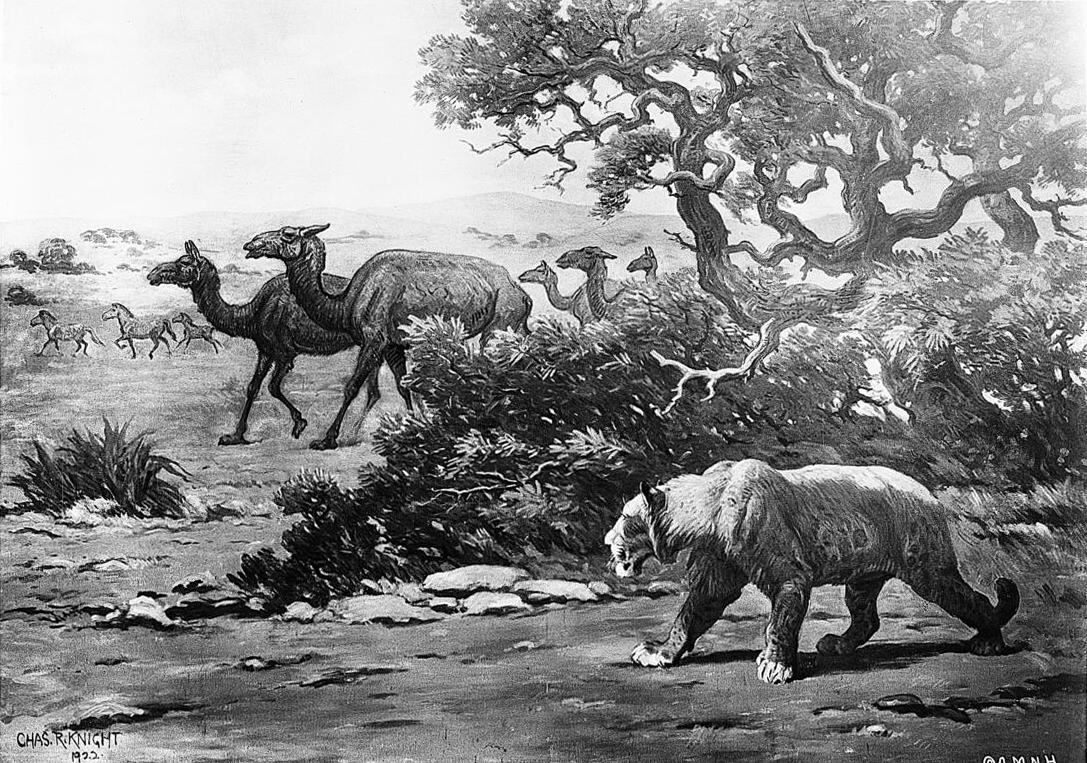
Restoration of an American lion following Camelops, by Charles R. Knight

The American lion was initially considered a distinct species of Pantherinae, and designated as Panthera atrox, which means "cruel" or "fearsome panther" in Latin. Some paleontologists accepted this view, but others considered it to be a type of lion closely related to the modern lion (Panthera leo) and its extinct relative, the Eurasian cave lion (Panthera leo spelaea or P. spelaea). It was later assigned as a subspecies of P. leo (P. leo atrox) rather than as a separate species. Most recently, both spelaea and atrox have been treated as full species.

Cladistic studies using morphological characteristics have been unable to resolve the phylogenetic position of the American lion. One study considered the American lion, along with the cave lion, to be most closely related to the tiger (Panthera tigris), citing a comparison of the skull; the braincase, in particular, appears to be especially similar to the braincase of a tiger. Another study suggested that the American lion and the Eurasian cave lion were successive offshoots of a lineage leading to a clade which includes modern leopards and lions. A more recent study comparing the skull and jaw of the American lion with other pantherines concluded that it was not a lion but a distinct species. It was proposed that it arose from pantherines that migrated to North America during the mid-Pleistocene and gave rise to American lions and jaguars (Panthera onca). Another study grouped the American lion with P. leo and P. tigris, and ascribed morphological similarities to P. onca to convergent evolution, rather than phylogenetic affinity.

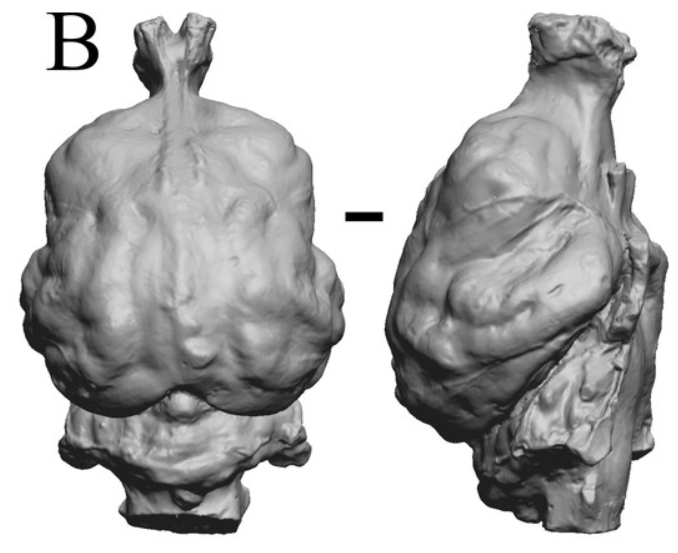
Digital endocast of the cranial cavity of P. atrox (LACMHC 2900-1).

However, genetic studies indicate that the living lion is the closest living relative of P. atrox and P. spelaea. Lion-like pantherines first appeared in the Tanzanian Olduvai Gorge about 1.7 to 1.2 million years ago. These felids then dispersed into Eurasia from East Africa around the end of the Early Pleistocene and the beginning of the Middle Pleistocene, giving rise to Panthera (spealea) fossilis. The oldest widely accepted fossils of P. fossilis in Europe date to around 700,000-600,000 years ago, such as that from Pakefield in England, with possible older fossils from Western Siberia and Spain dating to around 1 Mya of the late Early Pleistocene.

Mitochondrial genomic analysis suggests that Eurasian cave lions and modern lions split off around 1.85 Ma. On the other hand, nuclear DNA analysis found that modern lions and Eurasian cave lions suggests that the lineage of the cave lion and American lion diverged from that of the modern lion around 500,000,

Mitochondrial DNA sequence data from fossil remains suggests that the American lion (P. atrox) represents a sister lineage to Late Pleistocene populations of the Eurasian cave lion (P. spelaea), and likely arose when an early cave lion population became isolated south of the North American continental ice sheet. While initial studies suggested that the divergence between American and Eurasian cave lions took place around 340,000 years ago, later studies suggested that the split took place considerably later, around 165,000 years ago, consistent with the earliest appearance of cave lions in eastern Beringia (now Alaska) during the Illinoian (190-130,000 years ago).

Cladogram after Tseng et al. (2014):

- Felidae
  - Felinae
  - Pantherinae
    - Neofelis (clouded leopards)
    - Panthera
      - † Panthera palaeosinensis
      - - Panthera tigris (tiger)
        - Panthera uncia (snow leopard)
      - - Panthera onca (jaguar)
        - - Panthera pardus (leopard)
          - - Panthera leo (lion)
            - - †Panthera spelaea (cave lion)
              - †Panthera atrox (American lion)

== Description ==
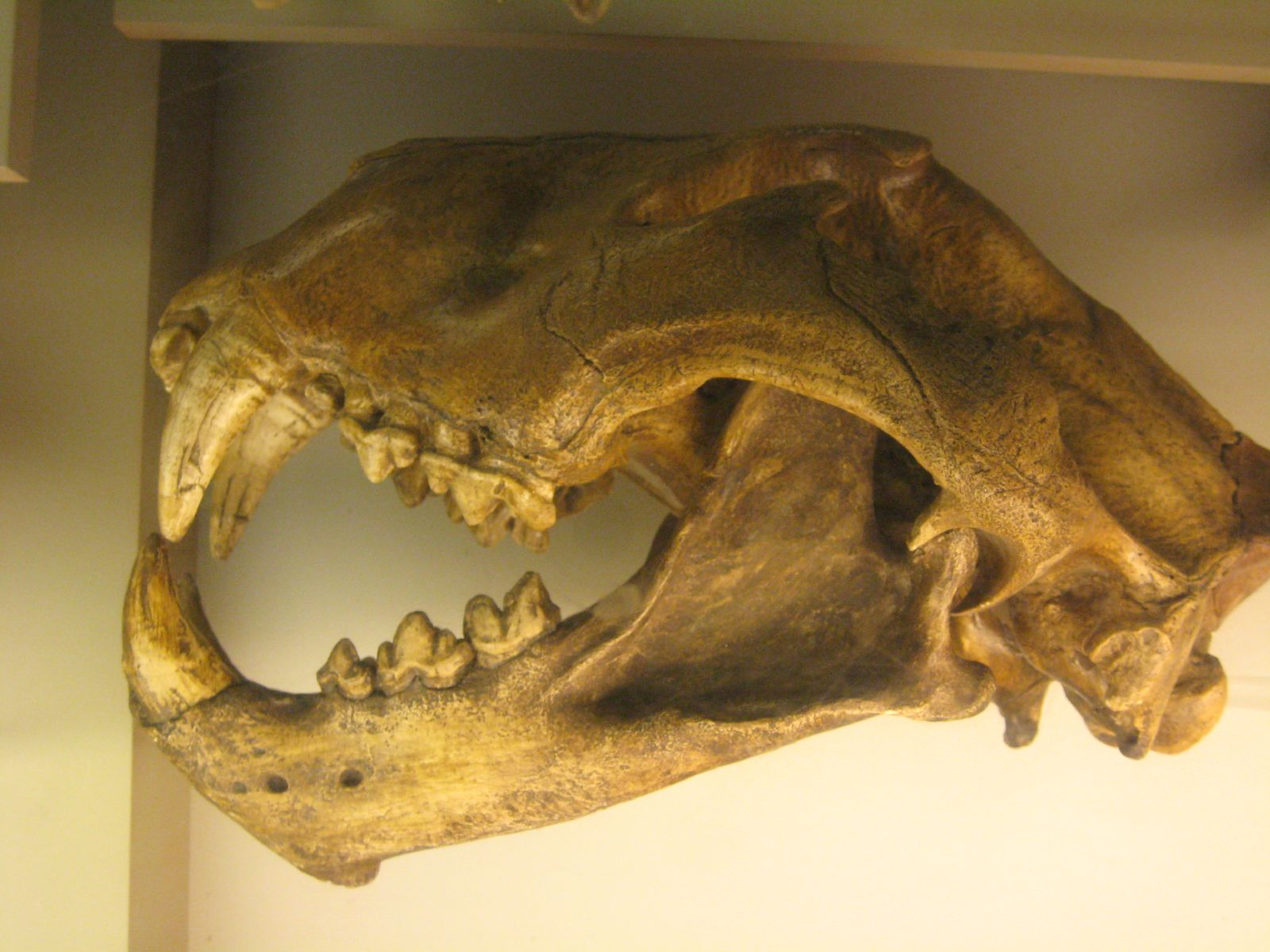
Skull at the National Museum of Natural History

=== Size ===
The American lion is estimated to have measured 1.6 to 2.5 m (5 ft 3 in to 8 ft 2 in) from the tip of the nose to the base of the tail and stood 1.2 m (3.9 ft) at the shoulder. Panthera atrox was sexually dimorphic, DeSantis et al. (2012) estimated that male American lions weighed between 235–523 kg (518–1,153 lb) in males, with females weighing between 175–365 kg (386–805 lb). Wheeler and Jefferson (2009) study found American lions were more sexually dimorphic than modern lions in terms of size: American lion males being 1.4 times larger than females, compared to modern male lions being 1.26 times larger. The study estimates that average males could've weighed 247 kg (545 lb), with the largest male within the sample weighing 457 kg (1,008 lb). While females averaged 177 kg (390 lb), with the largest female weighing 262 kg (578 lb). Sorkin (2008) estimated that the American lion may have weighed up to 420 kg (930 lb). Christiansen and Harris (2009) showed an average weight of 256 kg (564 lb) for males and 351 kg (774 lb) for the largest specimen analyzed.

=== Anatomy ===
About 80 American lion individuals have been recovered from the La Brea Tar Pits in Los Angeles, so their morphology is well known. Their features strongly resemble those of modern lions, but they were considerably larger, similar to Panthera spelaea and the Pleistocene Natodomeri lion of eastern Africa. Panthera atrox had limb bones more robust than those of an African lion, and comparable in robustness to the bones of a brown bear; also its limbs were 10% longer than extant African lion in relation to skull length. Regressions found both P. spealea and P. atrox having more robust limbs than the large machairodont Nimravides. The robustness of the humeri was likely the result being part of lineages of felids that possessed humeri significantly more robust than similar sized felids. Analysis of the cranial endocast suggests that the brain was similar to those of other patherine big cats, though the brain was less flexed in shape. The encephalization quotient (relative size of the brain compared to the body) is higher than the living lion, with the brain being among the largest in absolute size of any cat.

=== External Features ===
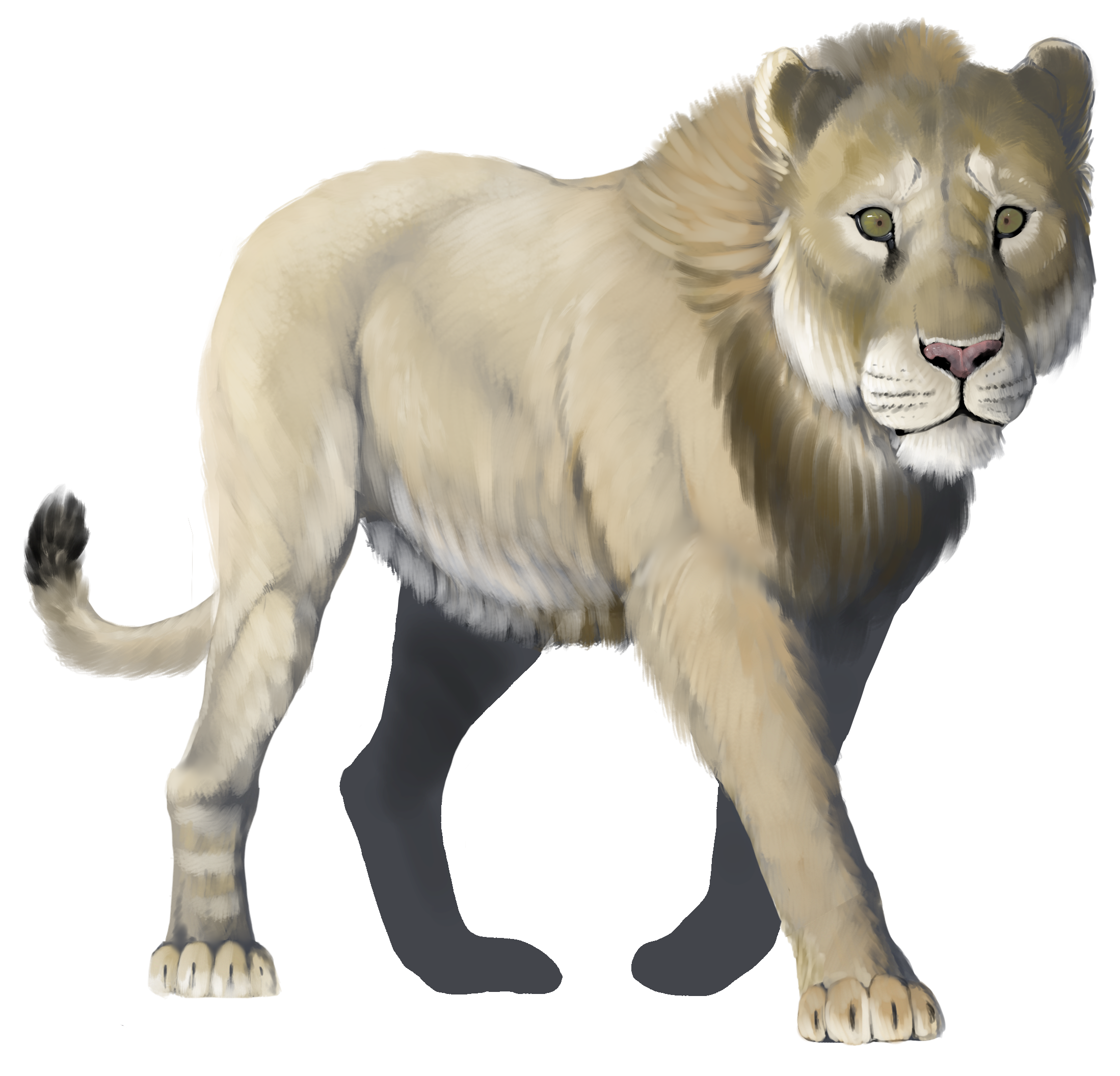
Reconstruction of an American lion with a visible mane, however the possibility of manes evolving in the Panthera spelaea lineage has been questioned by experts.

Preserved skin remains found with skeletal material considered by some to belong to the American lion found in caves in Patagonia is reddish in colour, though the attribution of Patagonian Panthera remains to P. atrox is highly controversial and not accepted by many authors. Preserved fur of the closely related P. spelaea found in Siberia suggests P. spelaea had similar colorations to the modern lion, although slightly lighter. It likely had a thick, as well as dense, undercoat comprising closed and compressed yellowish-to-white wavy downy hair with a smaller mass of darker-coloured guard hairs. Boeskorov et al. (2021) suggested while juveniles had yellowish fur, adults probably had grey fur. While it is unknown if American lions were maned or maneless, cave art of P. spelaea indicating that males lacked manes or at best had small manes. Manes was likely unique to the modern lion lineage as it postdated the split between cave lions and modern lions, likely evolving around 320-190 kya in modern lions. This hypothesis would suggest that manes likely didn't evolve in the cave lion lineage.

== Paleobiology ==
=== Predatory behavior and diet ===
American lions have been suggested to be diurnal predators unlike modern lions and other pantherines, who are primarily nocturnal or crepuscular. The American lion was thought to have been an ambush predator based on the limb proportions.

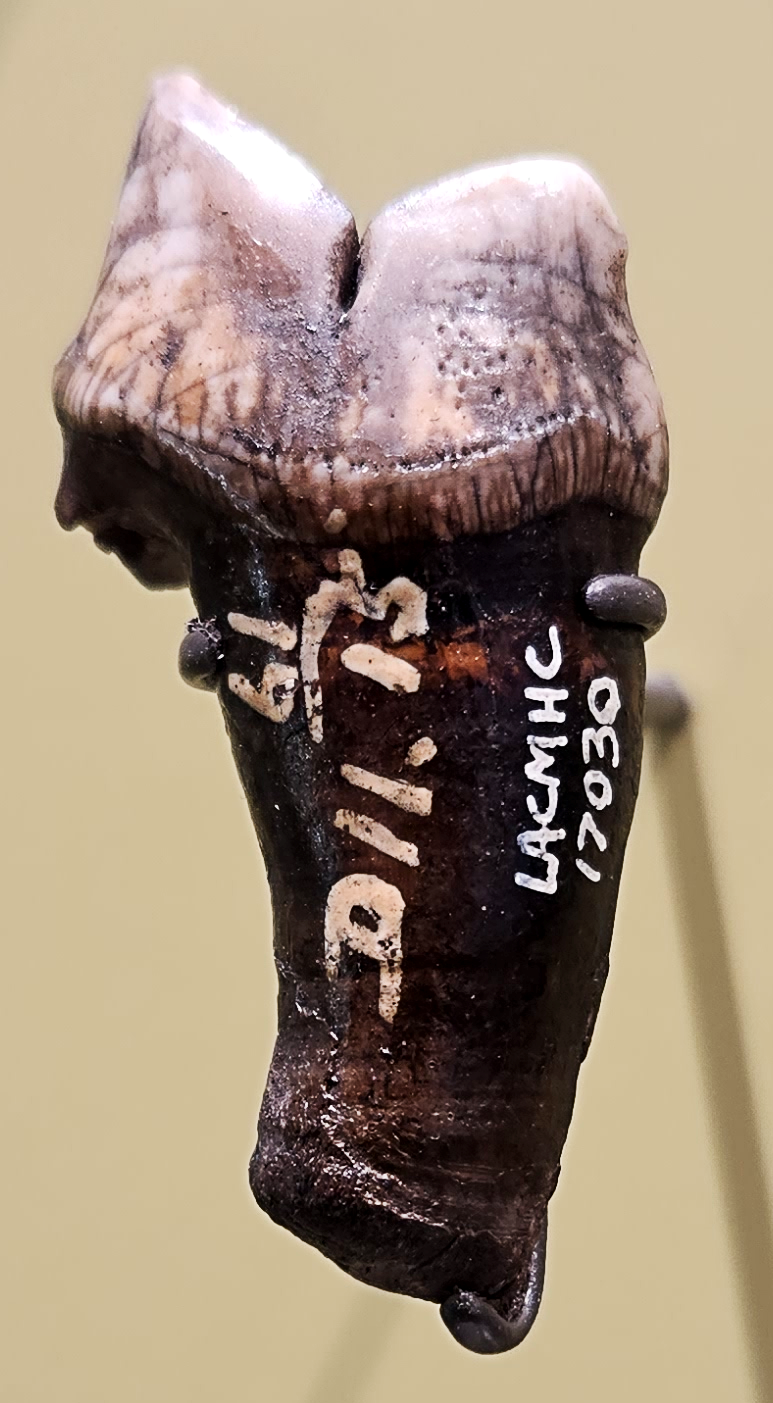
Molar recovered from the La Brea Tar Pitsassigned to P. atrox.

The mandibular geometry of American lions unambiguously indicates they were specialised to hunt large prey. American lions likely preyed on mammoths, deers, horses, camels, tapirs, the American bison, and other large ungulates (hoofed mammals). Paired nitrogen and carbon isotopic evidence from Natural Trap Cave in Wyoming reveals that the extant pronghorn was an important food source for American lions, which probably hunted them regularly, although probably also could be due to kleptoparasitism from the kills of Miracinonyx (sometimes called the "American cheetah"). Other than pronghorns, they seem to balance the rest of their diet equally between horses, bisons, and sheep. In San Luis Potosí, carbon isotopic reveals that American lions hunted in open forests, with its main prey being C_{4} mixed feeders such as bisons, pronghorns, horses, and mammoths, strontium isotopic analysis found that the American lion probably didn't travel long distances in the search for food and instead stayed close to the springs. At La Brea tar pits, isotopic analysis of δ^{15}N and δ^{13}C based on bone collagen found that American lion had overlapping values with Smilodon fatalis and dire wolves (Aenocyon dirus), suggesting high levels of competition between the three large carnivorans. However, more recent isotopic analysis of δ^{13}C based on tooth enamel revealed dire wolves had significantly higher mean δ^{13}C than American lions and Smilodon, with minimal overlap. Dire wolves focused more on open environments compared the American lion, who preferred forested-dwelling prey much like the contemporary Smilodon. The availability of prey in the Rancho La Brea area was likely comparable to modern East Africa.

Analyses of dental microwear suggest that the American lion actively avoided bone just like the modern cheetah (more so than Smilodon). Panthera atrox has the highest proportion of canine breakage in La Brea, suggesting a consistent preference for larger prey than contemporary carnivores. Dental microwear additionally suggests that carcass utilization slightly declined over time (~30,000 BP to 11,000 radiocarbon BP) in Panthera atrox. The fragment of a femur from a Furlong's wolf from the La Brea Tar Pits shows evidence of a violent bite which possibly amputated the leg. Researchers believe that Panthera atrox is a prime candidate for the injury, due to its bite force and bone shearing ability. Based on skull width, it is estimated that a 347 kg (765 lb) American lion would have a bite force of 2,830 newtons.

=== Social behavior ===
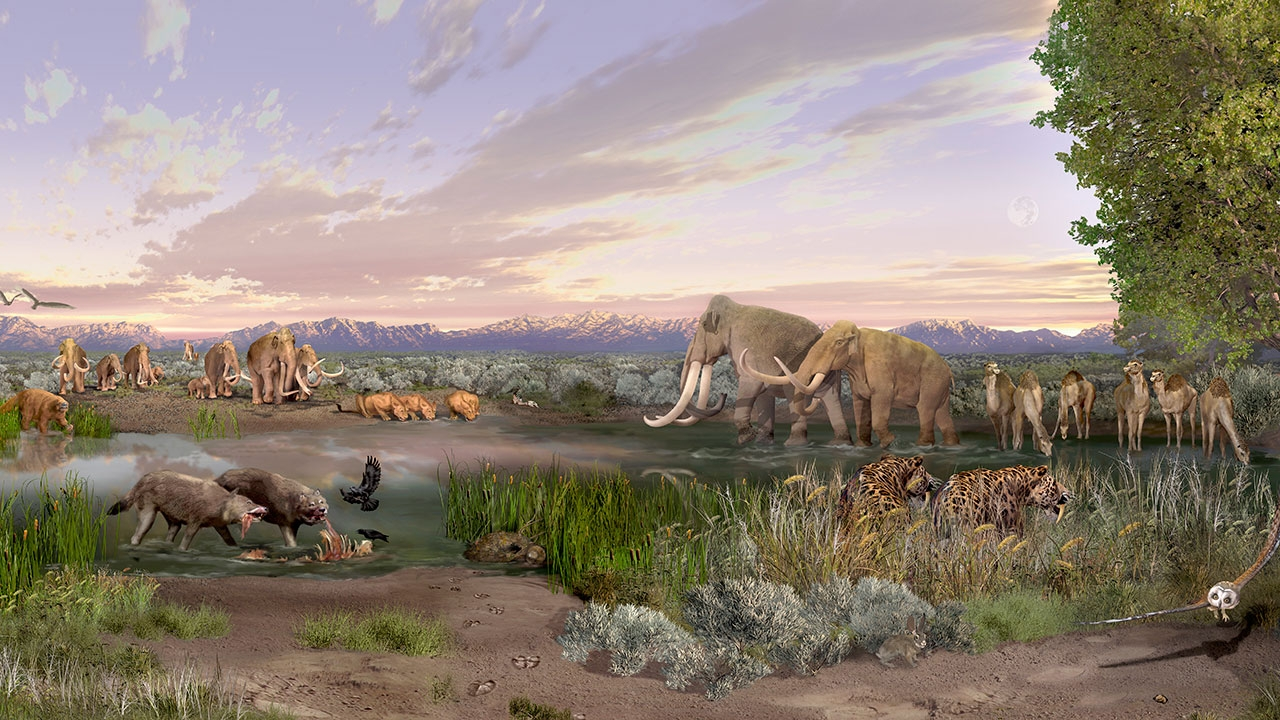
Environment of what is now White Sands National Park, with American lions drinking in the background

Like most Panthera species, based on the nature of their hyoid bones, American lions may have been capable of roaring. Whether American lion were gregarious like modern lions or lived solitary lives like tigers is unknown. Yamaguchi et al. argues for gregariousness in both Panthera spelaea and American lions because of their similar sexual dimorphism seen in modern lions and group-living probably evolved early in the lineage, on the other hand, Van Valkenburgh and Sacco, in their 2002 paper, warned that high levels of sexual dimorphism is not a reliable way to determine group behavior, as leopards have similar sexual dimorphism to lions, but are in contrasts solitary predators. Additionally, fossil evidence and several isotopic analysis found that P. spelaea was likely a solitary animal. In their 2009 study, Christiansen and Harris suggested American lions were in fact not part of the lion lineage and were solitary. However, genetic analysis suggests this is inaccurate and difference in representation in RLB suggests behavioral dissimilarities between the two species.

Some scientists suggested if American lions were gregarious, they likely had a larger brain to body mass than to solitary predators found at the La Brea Tar Pits. However, studies have shown there is no correlation in brain size to sociality in big cats. The remains of American lions are not as abundant as those of other predators like Smilodon fatalis or dire wolves (Aenocyon dirus) at the La Brea Tar Pits. This may suggest that they were better at evading entrapment, possibly due to greater intelligence. But the abundance of the seemingly intelligent dire wolf at the tar pits calls this hypothesis into question.

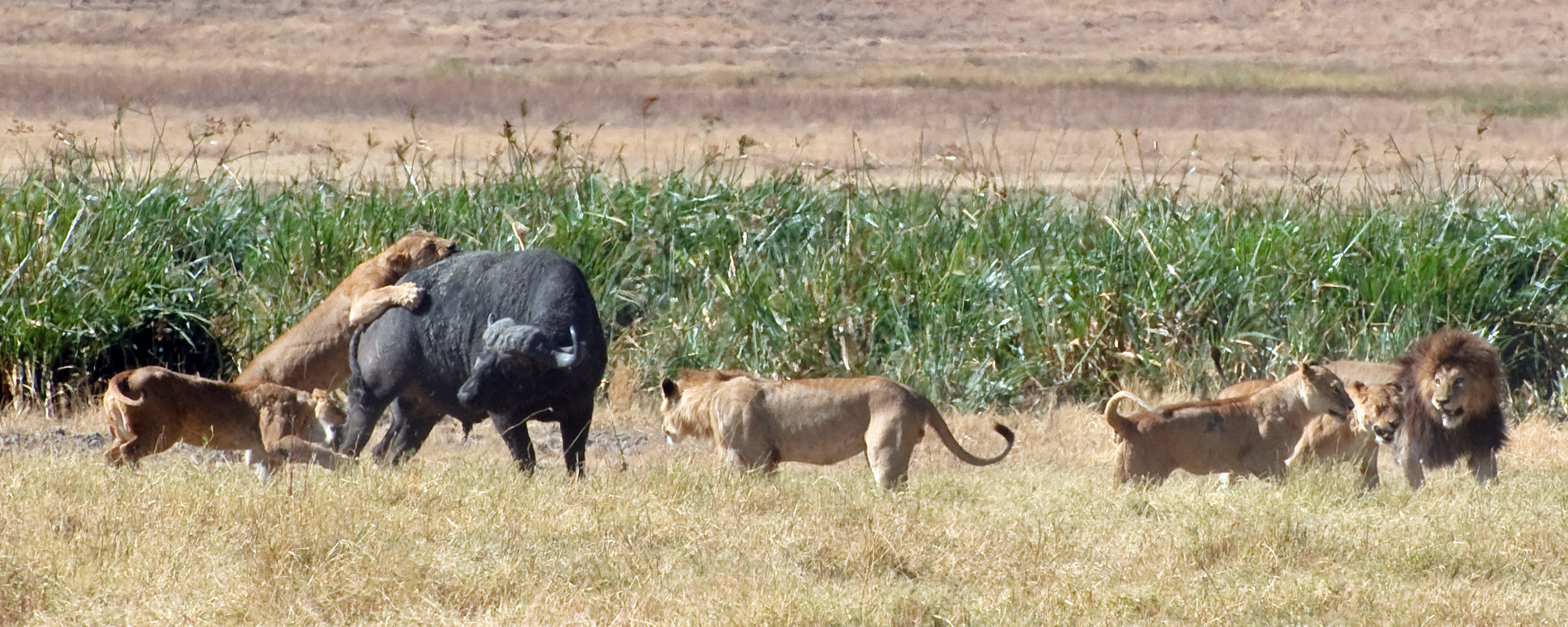
Lion pride attacking an African buffalo in Tanzania. Much like its modern relative, American lions may have hunted and lived in prides.

Despite its rarity, the high ratio of juveniles to adults recovered at the tar pits would suggest possible gregariousness in Panthera atrox. But its rarity in the tar pits would suggest that it was possibly more solitary than Smilodon and Aenocyon or was gregarious but lived in low densities similar to African wild dogs. Wheeler and Jefferson suggest American lions probably lived in prides like modern lions due to the large amounts of young males at dispersal age and the low number of young females found at the tar pits. They argued that female American lions were less likely to end up in the tar pits because they were more likely to remain in their natural prides in the youngest pits between 14 and 11 kya. However, the authors of the paper admit the small sample size of remains prior to 14 kya does not support or refute evidence of forming prides.

Compared to other Late Pleistocene large carnivores of North America, American lions exhibited a high rate of canine tooth breakage, with about 36% of a sample taken from La Brea showing evidence of canine tooth breakage. Because tooth breakage is more common among aggressive species, it is possible that this high rate of tooth fracture reflects a high degree of competition and aggression among American lions.

== Distribution ==
The earliest lions known in the Americas south of Alaska are from the Sangamonian Stage (equivalent to the global Last Interglacial ~130-115,000 years ago) during which American lions rapidly dispersed across North America, with their distribution ultimately ranging from Canada to southern Mexico and from California to the Atlantic coast. It was generally not found in the same areas as the jaguar, which favored forests over open habitats. It was absent from eastern Canada and the northeastern United States, perhaps due to the presence of dense boreal forests in the region. Farther south, fossilised remains of the American lion have been discovered in Extinction Cave, Belize. The American lion was formerly believed to have colonized northwestern South America as part of the Great American Interchange. Fossils of the American lion were reported from tar pits in Talara, Peru, however, the fossil remains actually belong to an unusually large jaguar. On the other hand, fossils of a large felid from late Pleistocene localities in southern Chile and Argentina traditionally identified as an extinct subspecies of jaguar, Panthera onca mesembrina, have been considered by some authors to actually represent the American lion, though other researchers remain skeptical of this identification.

The American lion is believed to have inhabited savannas and grasslands like the modern lion. Isotopic analysis suggests that American lions also inhabited forests and areas with sparse tree coverings, suggesting this species lived in a wide variety of environments.

== Extinction ==
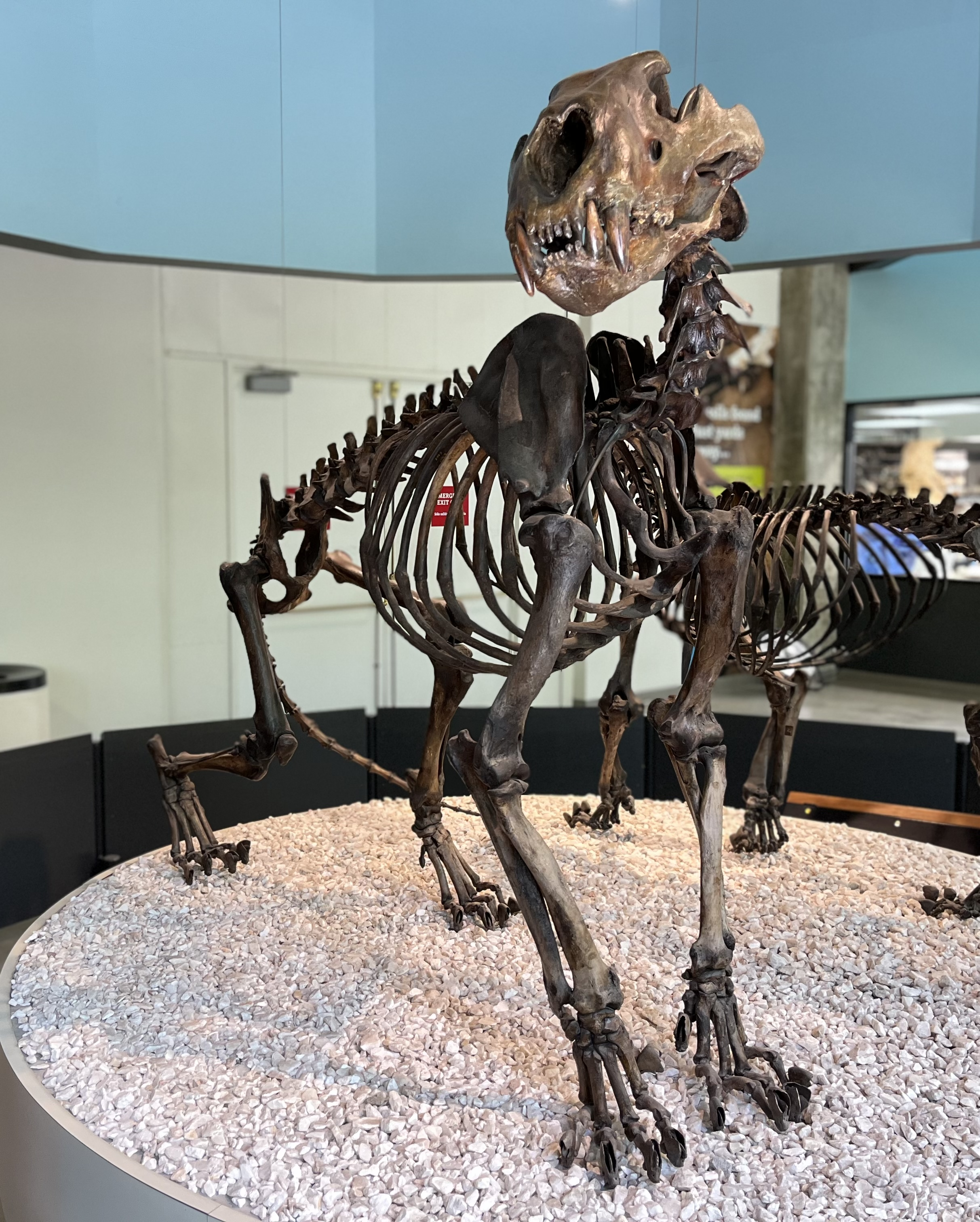
Skeletons of the American lion and Smilodon fatalis (back), two large North American felids which went extinct during the Late Pleistocene, George C. Page Museum

The American lion became extinct as part of the end-Pleistocene extinctions around 13-12,000 years ago, approximately simultaneously with most large (megafaunal) mammals in North America. The most recent fossil, from Edmonton, Canada, dates to ~12,877 calibrated years Before Present, and is 400 years younger than the youngest cave lion in Alaska. However, O'Keefe et al. (2023) found the most recent fossils within Rancho La Brea dating to 13,100 years ago. Within the same paper, they noted it was the youngest reliable occurrences in North America.

The causes of the extinctions have been long the subject of controversy, with most authors positing climate change, human hunting or some combination of the two as the causes of the extinctions. Arias-Alzate et al. (2017) suggested that the viable habitat for the American lion in North America had been greatly reduced over the course of the Last Glacial Period, which would have made it more vulnerable to extinction. Valkenburgh and Hertz (1993) argued that the higher levels of dental fractures suggests prey abundance was limited, at least seasonally, which increased consumption of carcasses and reflect tough times for large carnivores up until their extinction. However, the argument of dental microwear reflecting tough times has been questioned by DeSantis et al. (2012). They argued that larger carnivores have relatively weaker teeth, which suggests the reason for increased levels of canine breakage seen in Smilodon and the American lion was the result of consuming large prey. In addition, carcass utilization declined among American lions during more recent times, contradicting the claims that life was getting tougher in La Brea.

Ripple and Valkenburgh (2010) have suggested that the extinction of the American lion and other competing carnivores like dire wolves, and the sabertooth cats Smilodon and Homotherium may have been due to trophic cascade effects caused by Paleoindian hunting of herbivores. These authors suggested that the herbivores already probably existed at low population numbers prior to Paleoindian arrival due to their abundance being limited by predators rather than being at the carrying capacity of the ecosystem based on food resources. Due to humans having a more flexible omnivorous diet they may have been less subject to competition with other apex predators, allowing their population numbers to increase even as the number of herbivores declined.

At La Brea, the American lion and most mammalian megafauna disappeared in a tight span of just 300 years, closely related to the first arrival of humans in the area. The extinction of the American lion predated the Younger Dryas and coincided with the Bølling-Allerød warming. During the Bølling-Allerød, there was an increase in temperature and opening of habitats which correlated to the decline of herbivores. Fire activity increased dramatically, likely as a result of human activity, and the dominant vegetation switched from forest dominated to chaparral. The increasing number of extinct carnivores trapped in the La Brea Tar Pits as time passed, including lions just before their final extinction, has been theorized as an effect of predators increasingly seeking carcasses trapped in the asphalt to scavenge as a way to make up for the depletion of herds available to hunt elsewhere, due to prey animals being decimated by human competitors.

== See also ==
- Panthera spelaea
- Panthera fossilis
- List of largest carnivorans
- List of largest prehistoric carnivorans
- Megafauna
