= Iemisch =

Supposed Patagonian creature

Creature information
- Other name(s): Iemisch Listai; Mapinguari; Neomylodon
- Grouping: Cryptid
- Similar entities: Bunyip; Ahuizotl

Origin
- Region: Patagonia

The Iemisch (a.k.a. Iemisch Listai) is a supposed cryptid from Patagonia, specifically in the mountains near the Lake Colhué region. First attested to by Florentino Ameghino in 1897, a full study on the creature was published in the 1955 book On the Track of Unknown Animals.

From the original letter:

The animal is of nocturnal habits, and it's said to be so strong that it can seize horses with its claws and drag them to the bottom of the water. According to the description I have been given, it has a short head, big canine teeth, and no external ears: its feet are short and plantigrade, with three toes on the forefeet and four on the hind, three toaes are formed by a membrane for swimming, and are also armed with formidable claws. Its tail is long, flat and prehensile.

— Florentino Ameghino,

During follow-up research by Bernard Heuvelmans, the local population described the iemisch as a mixture of a jaguar and otter, though by some accounts it was as big as an ox. He claimed the creature was also referred to as a tigre d'acqua, similar to the ahuizotl. It reportedly could move as quickly on land as in the water, and was described as having a "soul-wrenching scream".

Robert Lehmann-Nitsche, a German anthropologist working in Argentina, claimed to have a sample of the iemisch's skin given to him by a local rancher. He stated that there were small bone plates embedded in its skin, which protected the creature from arrowheads. The rancher reported that the sample was found near human remains, leading him to believe that the iemisch had been hunted.

Robert Lehmann-Nitsche and Santiago Roth would eventually publish more iemisch tales, concluding that the iemisch must be an unknown type of otter. Upon peer review, paleontologist John Bell Hatcher noted that though he had spent equal amounts of time with Patagonian natives, he had never heard of such a creature. Later scholars also cast doubt on research by Heuvelmans, noting that the word 'Iemisch' isn't associated with any language spoken in Patagonia.

== See also ==
- Ahuizotl
