= Blue Spring Cave =

Cave in White County, Tennessee

Blue Spring Cave is a cave located in White County, Tennessee, on the north side of Blue Spring Cove. Blue Spring Cave is Tennessee's 2nd longest cave and the 10th longest cave in the United States.

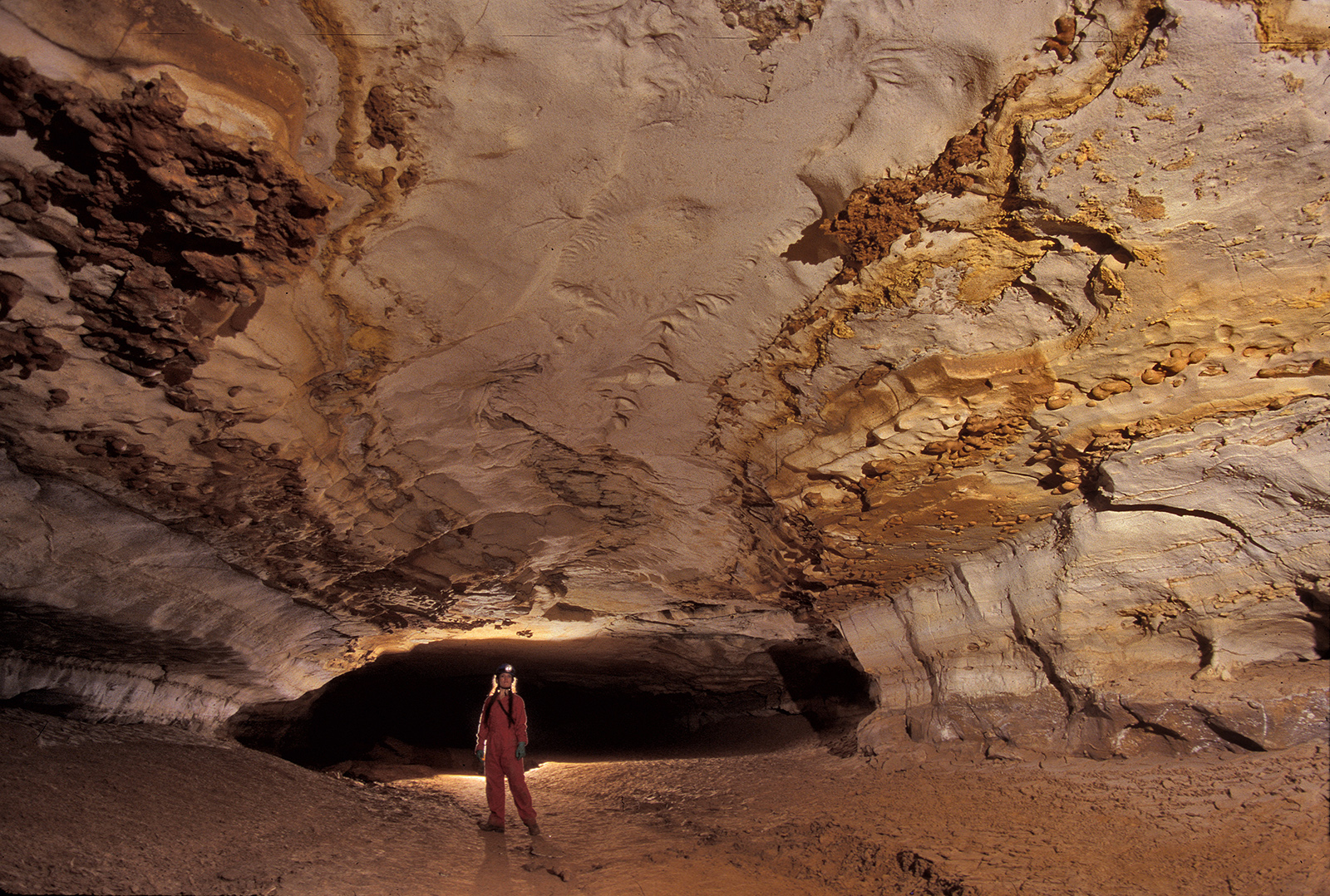
Typical passage in Blue Spring Cave, TN

Blue Spring Cave had an explored length of only 500 feet as recently as 1989. In that year a group of cavers enlarged a hole with air movement at the rear of the cave that dropped into a large passage which they named Johnson Avenue, in honor of the owner of the property on which the cave's entrance is located.

A second, artificial entrance to the cave was excavated in 2001. This new entrance is named the Carr Entrance, in honor of the family that owns the land on which it is located. This new entrance makes it possible to enter directly into Johnson Avenue and bypass the tight crawlway that connects the historical front 500 feet of the cave to the new discoveries. This entrance is securely gated, and entrance is by permission only.

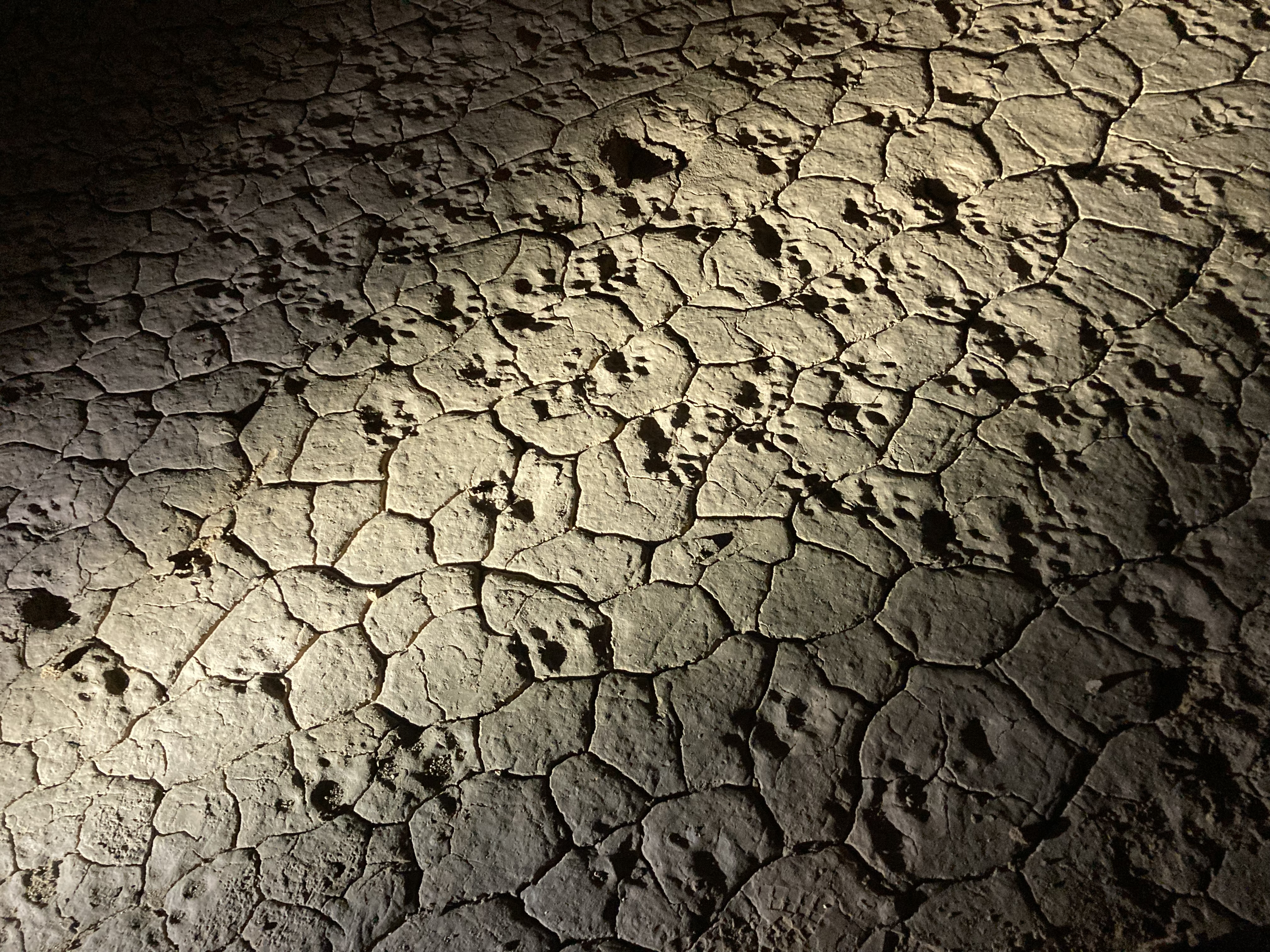
The preserved panther footprints inside the cave.

On October 2, 2010, cave divers made the connection from Blue Spring Resurgence to Blue Spring Cave, making the new mapped length of Blue Spring Cave 36.42 miles. This made Blue Spring Cave the 9th longest mapped cave in the United States.

As of February 11, 2012, the surveyed length of Blue Spring Cave is 38.4 miles. This new length was announced by Bill Walter at the 2012 SERA Winter Business Meeting.

Blue Spring Cave is one of several Tennessee caves where footprints of Ice Age (Pleistocene) jaguars (Panthera onca augusta) have been discovered. It weighed an estimated 450 to 500 pounds, compared to the modern jaguar which weighs only 200 to 225 pounds. The footprints in Blue Spring Cave were first noticed by Bill Walter in 1990, but he did not realize how old they were. Additional jaguar footprints were discovered by Hal Love on November 15, 2003, and, based on this discovery, their age and significance were recognized. These tracks are not close to any existing entrance, and it is surmised that the animal entered through a nearby entrance that has since collapsed.

== See also ==
- List of longest caves in the United States
