= Ahuizotl (mythology) =

Aztec mythological creature

Ahuízotl
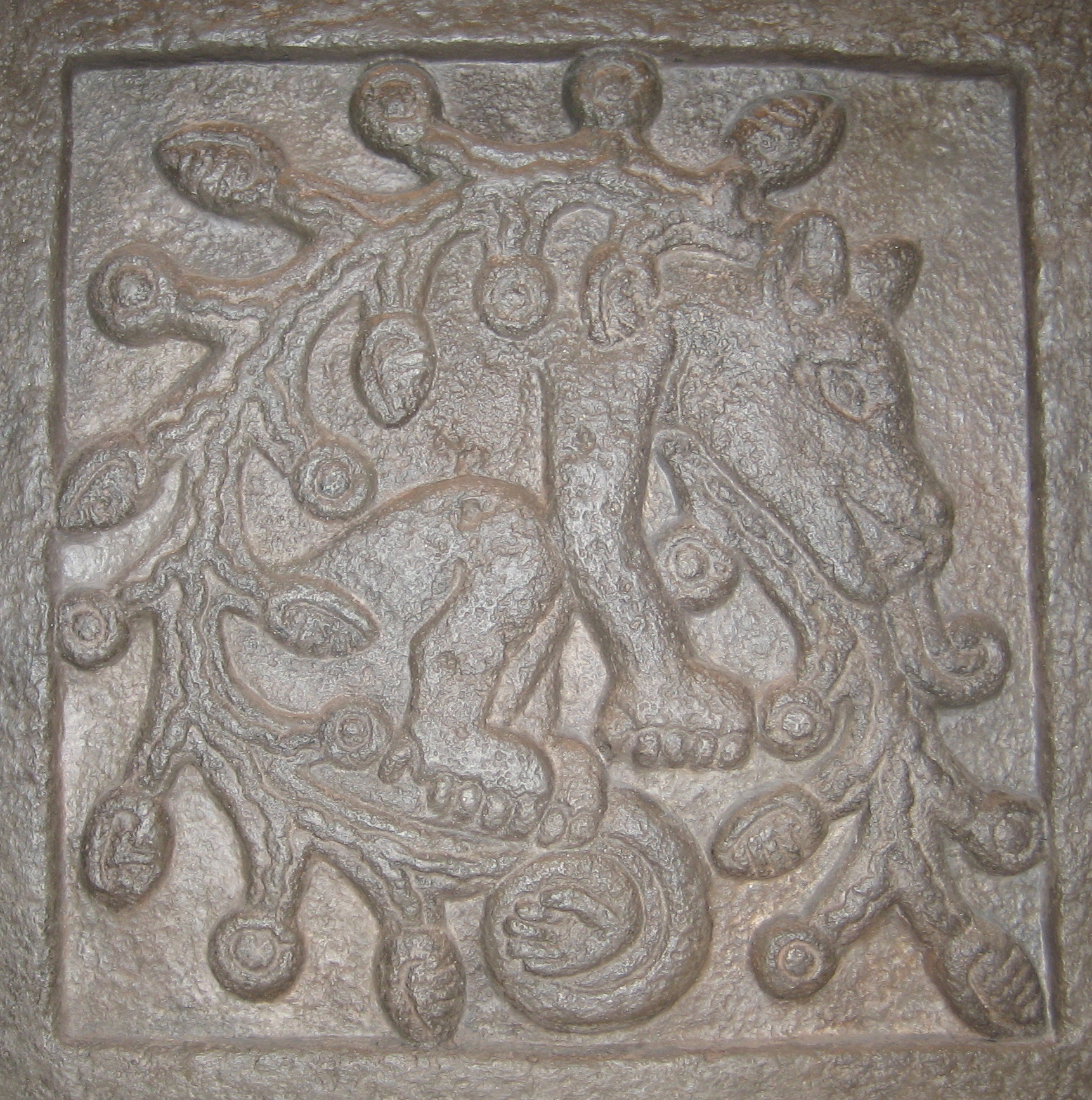
- An ahuizotl glyph, from Tepoztlan.

Creature information
- Other name: Water Dog
- Similar entities: Nguruvilu, Kelpie, Underwater panther, Iemisch
- Folklore: Legendary creature

Origin
- Country: Mexico
- Region: Lake Texcoco

The ahuizotl (from the Classical Nahuatl: āhuitzotl for "spiny aquatic thing", a.k.a. "water dog") is a legendary creature in Aztec mythology. It is said to lure people to their deaths. The creature was taken as an emblem by the ruler of the same name, and was said to be a "friend of the rain gods". The ahuizotl is most likely a water opossum, which possesses dexterous hands "like a raccoon's or a monkey's", as well as a prehensile tail (the hand most likely represents this prehensile nature), waterproof marbled black and grey fur, and small pointed ears.

The conquistador Hernán Cortés once reported to the King of Castile that one of his men had been killed by an ahuizotl.

The name of the revolutionary anti-porfirist periodical El Hijo del Ahuizote (The Son of the Ahuizote) is in reference to the ahuízotl.

== Appearance ==
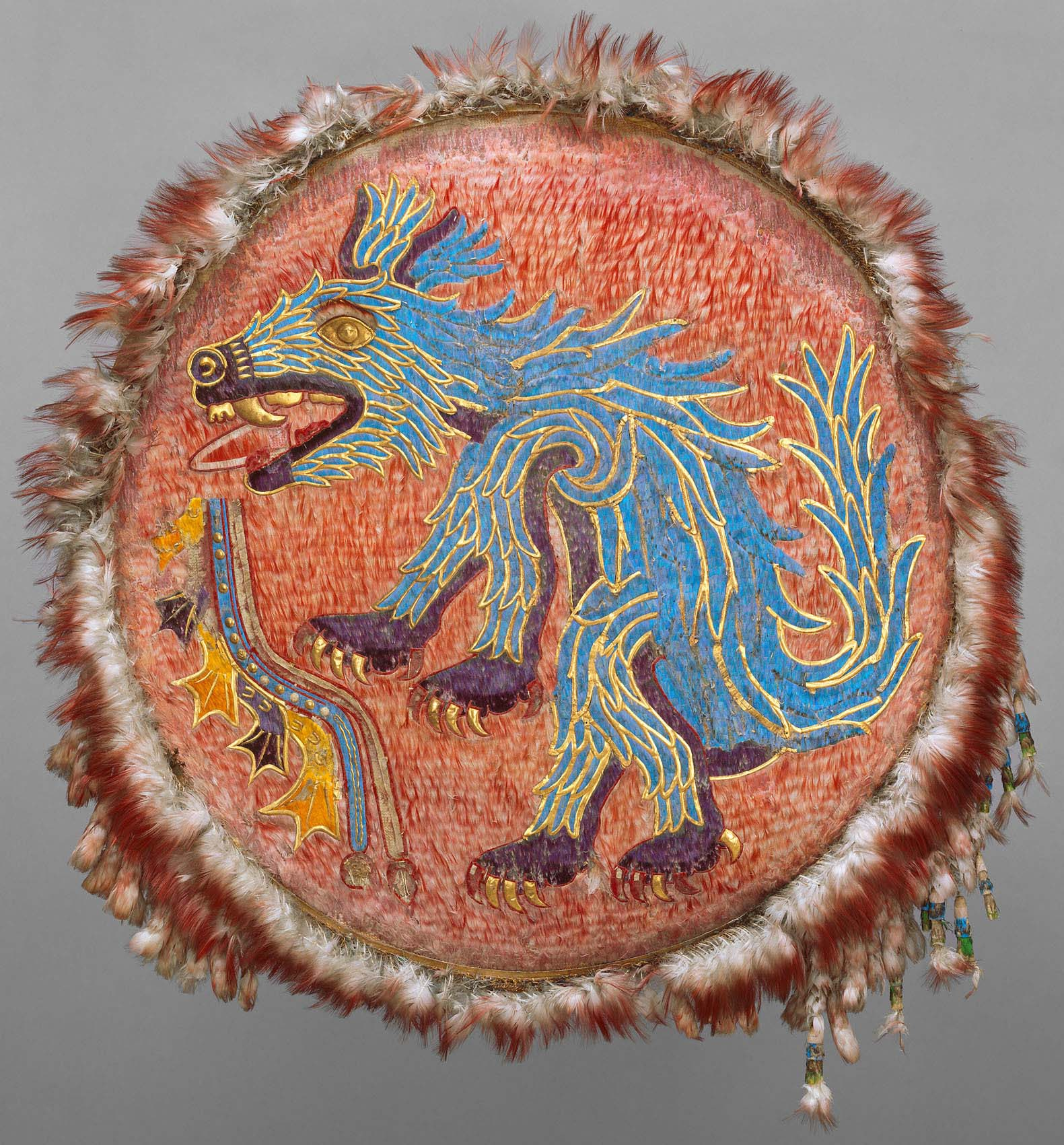
An ahuizotl depicted on the shield of the ruler Ahuizotl

The creature is described as being the size of a small dog, with waterproof fur. Its name comes from the propensity of its fur to spike when it leaves the water. The ahuizotl has hands similar to a monkey's, which are capable of manipulation, both on its arms and on its tail.

The ahuizotl was included within Book 11 of the Florentine Codex, which describes it as:

...very like the teui, the small teui dog; small and smooth, shiny. It has small, pointed ears, just like a small dog. It is black, like rubber; smooth, slippery, very smooth, long-tailed. And its tail is provided with a hand at the end; just like a human hand is the point of its tail. And its hands are like a raccoon's hands or like a monkey's hands....

== Behavior ==
One telling of the story says that the ahuizotl was the guardian of lakes, whose purpose was to protect the fish therein. In other versions, it was sent by the gods Tlaloc and Chalchiuhtlicue to collect the souls of mortals they liked. Due to their close link with the water gods, victims of the ahuizotl were said to be destined for the paradise of the god Tlaloc.

It is described as living in deep pools of water, or caverns. Sightings have mostly been reported in the Lake Texcoco area, though a few have been reported even outside of the borders of what would have been the Aztec Empire.

By most accounts, the ahuizotl would snatch people from the water's edge, so that it could feast on their eyes, nails, and teeth. Alternatively, the victim was chosen by the water gods because it possessed the wrong type of precious stones. Some fishermen claimed that the ahuizotl would sink their boats, and would offer a portion of their catch to appease the creature.

When the ahuizotl hadn't successfully caught a human in some time, it had two methods by which to draw victims to the water. It could lure people to their deaths by emitting a cry similar to a human baby's wail. It could also cause all of the frogs and fish in the body of water to jump to the surface, which would bring fishermen to the water's edge.

The ahuizotl was said to use the hand on the end of its tail to snatch its prey.

If a person was suspected of being killed by an ahuizotl, only priests were allowed to touch the body, which should be buried in a house surrounded by water (or "ayauhcalco"). If a layman were to touch the body, it's said that he would either be the ahuizotl's next victim, or else suffer from gout.
