= Santiago Roth =

Swiss Argentine paleontologist and academic

Santiago Roth (14 June 1850 – 4 August 1924) was a Swiss Argentine paleontologist and academic known for his fossil collections and Patagonian expeditions.

== Life ==
Kaspar Jakob (Spanish: Santiago) was born and raised in Herisau, Canton Appenzell Ausserrhoden, Switzerland, as the oldest of 12 children. He attended school in the nearby town of St. Gallen, where his teacher Bernhard Wartmann raised his interest in the science of nature. Wartmann was a well known botanist and director of the Museum of History of Nature in St. Gallen.

For economic reasons the Roth family emigrated to Argentina in 1866, where they initially settled in the Colonia Baradero (Buenos Aires Province). There, Roth started a small business with leather goods. In his spare time he collected plants, butterflies and rocks. He married Elisabeth Schuetz, a teacher educated in Switzerland, who emigrated with her family to Argentina in 1872 as well.

After finding his first fossils he became an ardent explorer and collector of extinct mammals. Already in 1878 he was able to sell a collection of fossils to Dr. Laussen, a Dane, who gave these bones to the Museum of Zoology in Copenhagen. Roth was encouraged to continue finding and collecting rare prehistoric mammals as a profession. He contacted Prof. Carl Vogt at the University of Geneva, who was interested to buy a further collection from Roth. The transport arrived in Geneva heavily damaged. Therefore, Roth traveled to Switzerland in 1880 to repair the skeletons in the laboratories of the university. There, he had the additional benefit of being able to attend lectures on geology, zoology and osteology.

After his return to Argentina, he continued his search in the basin of the Paraná River and in the Entre Ríos Province belonging to the Pampas. He published his findings in his mother tongue, German.

Roth was continuously looking for buyers to generate income for his large family. Such an opportunity arose in 1887 when he traveled to Switzerland with his family. The Swiss geologist Prof. Albert Heim, ETH Zurich had recommended that the Swiss authorities should buy his collection nr. 5. Today, this collection is held by the Museum of Zoology at the University of Zurich and includes a huge, extinct ground sloth (Megatherium) as well as a large armored mammal (Glyptodon). A special exhibition including the Roth collection was organized in 2000. During his stay in Switzerland he joined Albert Heim on his hydrogeological excursions to study subterranean water flows. These experiences were of much value in his country of residence, Argentina.

Roth extended his range of paleontological expeditions to Patagonia, including the areas along the Rio Negro, Limay River and Chubut River, partly together with F. Machon, another researcher from Switzerland from 1885 to 1891. There, he saw Nahuel Huapi Lake for the first time.

Francisco Moreno (known as Perito Moreno, the famous Perito Moreno Glacier in Patagonia is named after him), first director of the La Plata Museum in the new capital of the Province Buenos Aires, named Roth as head of the Department of Paleontology at this museum in 1895. His friend Florentino Ameghino worked at this institution as well.

Moreno had a mandate from the Government of Argentina to work out a solution for the border disputes with Chile in the Andes region. Roth joined Moreno in 1897 – 1899 and again in 1902 on his expeditions. While at Lake Nahuel Huapi Moreno asked Roth to find a suitable place for a new settlement on the shores of this lake. He proposed a particular site and filed corresponding land claims for Swiss and German families already living in the area. This was the origin of the town to be named San Carlos de Bariloche later on.

In a publication dated 1903 Roth defined the order of Notoungulata as a category of prehistoric hoofed mammals found only in South America.

Roth was named professor for paleontology at the National University of La Plata in 1905. In 1908 he also became director of the Geological-Topographical Institute of the Buenos Aires Province. In this capacity he organized a series of wells to find groundwater. The Argentine government sent him to the arid regions of the Santiago del Estero Province where he installed many wells. The local population was very grateful to get better access to drinking water.

His last expedition to Patagonia took place from 1921 to 1922.

== Honors ==
- The University of Zurich honored him with the title Dr. phil. honoris causa in 1900
- Roth was elected as member of the International Committee of Geological Correlation, New York, the only member from South America.
- A species of South American lizard, Liolaemus rothi, is named in his honor, as is the fossil mammal Santiagorothia.

== Literature ==
- Fernández, M.: Catalogue des principales publications du Prof. Dr. Santiago Roth, in: Machon F.: Le géologue Prof. Dr. Santiago Roth, 1850-1924, Verh. Schweizerische Naturforschende Gesellschaft, Aarau 1925, pp. 35–41 (including list of work)
- Kraglievich, L.: En Memoria del Doctor Santiago Roth, Geólogo y Paleontólogo, Physis, Buenos Aires, 1925/7, pp. 412–417
