= 1995 All-Western Athletic Conference football team =

American football team

The 1995 All-Western Athletic Conference football team consists of American football players chosen for their All-Western Athletic Conference ("WAC") teams for the 1995 NCAA Division I-A football season. Five teams dominated the 1995 All-WAC first team as follows:

- Conference co-champion BYU placed six players on the first team: tight end Chad Lewis, offensive lineman Larry Moore, linebackers Shay Muirbrook and Stan Raass, and defensive lineman John Raass.
- Conference co-champion Colorado State placed five players on the first team: offensive lineman James Cregg, defensive linemen Sean Moran and Brady Smith, and defensive backs Ray Jackson and Greg Myers.
- Wyoming finished in sixth place but placed five players on the first team: wide receiver Marcus Harris, offensive lineman Steve Scifres, defensive lineman Joe Cummings, placekicker Cory Wedel, and punter Brian Gragert.
- Fifth-place San Diego State placed four players on the first team: running back George Jones, wide receiver Will Blackwell, offensive lineman Chris Finch, and defensive back Ricky Parker.
- Conference co-champion Air Force placed three players on the first team: quarterback Beau Morgan, offensive lineman Bret Cillessen, and linebacker Brian McCray.

== Offensive selections ==
=== Quarterbacks ===
- Beau Morgan, Air Force (Coaches-1)
- Billy Blanton, San Diego State (Coaches-2)

=== Running backs ===
- George Jones, San Diego State (Coaches-1)
- Winslow Oliver, New Mexico (Coaches-1)
- Hema Heimuli, BYU (Coaches-2)
- Toraino Singleton, UTEP (Coaches-2)
- E. J. Watson, Colorado State (Coaches-2)

=== Wide receivers ===
- Will Blackwell, San Diego State (Coaches-1)
- Marcus Harris, Wyoming (Coaches-1)
- Charlie Jones, Fresno State (Coaches-1)
- Jahine Arnold, Fresno State (Coaches-2)
- Az-Zahir Hakim, San Diego State (Coaches-2)
- Rocky Henry, Utah (Coaches-2)

=== Tight ends ===
- Chad Lewis, BYU (Coaches-1)
- Henry Lusk, Utah (Coaches-2)

=== Offensive linemen ===
- Bret Cillessen, Air Force (Coaches-1)
- James Cregg, Colorado State (Coaches-1)
- Chris Finch, San Diego State (Coaches-1)
- Larry Moore, BYU (Coaches-1)
- Steve Scifres, Wyoming (Coaches-1)
- Jay Korth, Wyoming (Coaches-2)
- Chris Rae, Utah (Coaches-2)
- Kyle Turley, San Diego State (Coaches-2)
- Brandon Turner, New Mexico (Coaches-2)
- Matt Tyner, New Mexico (Coaches-2)

== Defensive selections ==
=== Defensive linemen ===
- Joe Cummings, Wyoming (Coaches-1)
- Sean Moran, Colorado State (Coaches-1)
- John Raass, BYU (Coaches-1)
- Brady Smith, Colorado State (Coaches-1)
- Avo Avetisyan, San Diego State (Coaches-2)
- Cameron Curry, Air Force (Coaches-2)
- La'Roi Glover, San Diego State (Coaches-2)
- Henry Kaufusi, Utah (Coaches-2)

=== Linebackers ===
- Michael Comer, UTEP (Coaches-1)
- Brian McCray, Air Force (Coaches-1)
- Shay Muirbrook, BYU (Coaches-1)
- Stan Raass, BYU (Coaches-1)
- Karl Ballard, Colorado State (Coaches-2)
- Jason Holanda, Wyoming (Coaches-2)
- George Noga, Hawaii (Coaches-2)
- Craigus Thompson, San Diego State (Coaches-2)

=== Defensive backs ===
- Raymond Jackson, Colorado State (Coaches-1)
- Harold Lusk, Utah (Coaches-1)
- Greg Myers, Colorado State (Coaches-1)
- Ricky Parker, San Diego State (Coaches-1)
- LeRon Hudgins, Air Force (Coaches-2)
- Kelvin King, Air Force (Coaches-2)
- Tim McTyer, BYU (Coaches-2)
- Omar Stoutmire, Fresno State (Coaches-2)

== Special teams ==
=== Placekickers ===
- Cory Wedel, Wyoming (Coaches-1)
- Dan Pulsipher, Utah (Coaches-2)

=== Punters ===
- Brian Gragert, Wyoming (Coaches-1)
- Noel Prefontaine, San Diego State (Coaches-2)

=== Return specialist ===
- James Dye, BYU (Coaches-1)
- Greg Myers, Colorado State (Coaches-2)

== See also ==
- 1995 College Football All-America Team
