= Wilbert Brown =

American football player (born 1977)

No. 59, 60, 74
- Position: Guard / Center

Personal information
- Born: May 9, 1977 (age 49); Texarkana, Texas, U.S.

Career information
- High school: Hooks (TX)
- College: Houston
- NFL draft: 1999: undrafted

Career history
- San Diego Chargers (1999-2000); Tampa Bay Buccaneers (2001)*; Frankfurt Galaxy (2001-2002); Washington Redskins (2002-2003); New England Patriots (2003)
- * Offseason or practice squad member only

Awards and highlights
- Super Bowl champion (XXXVIII); Second-team All-Conference USA (1998)

Career NFL statistics
- Games played: 20
- Games started: 9
- Stats at Pro Football Reference

Wilbert Lemon Brown (born May 9, 1977) is an American former professional football player who was a guard and center in the National Football League (NFL) for the San Diego Chargers, Washington Redskins, and New England Patriots. He played college football for the Houston Cougars.

Brown has also played for the Frankfurt Galaxy of the NFL Europe League.

== Early life ==
Brown played high school football at Hooks High School in Hooks, Texas.

== College career ==
Brown played college football at the University of Houston. In his senior season in 1998, he started all 11 games at guard and earned second-team All-Conference USA honors. During his collegiate career, Brown played in 41 games with 31 starts.

== Professional career ==
=== San Diego Chargers ===
Brown was signed by the San Diego Chargers as an undrafted free agent in 1999. As a rookie, he saw action in five games.
