= Gerald Brown (American football) =

American football coach (born 1959)

Personal information
- Born: September 4, 1959 (age 67); Sweetwater, Tennessee

Career information
- High school: Sweetwater (TN)
- College: Memphis State (1979–1981)

Career history
- Tennessee (1983) Graduate assistant; Tennessee (1984–1988) Scout and Computer analyst; Tennessee Tech (1989–1998) Assistant coach; Memphis Maniax (2001) Running backs coach; Indiana (2002–2007) Running backs coach; Atlanta Falcons (2008–2014) Running backs coach; Tennessee (2017–2018) Offensive analyst; Birmingham Iron (2019) Running backs coach

Gerald Brown (born September 4, 1959) is an American football coach who was the Atlanta Falcons running backs coach from 2008 to 2014. During his time with the Falcons, he coached two Pro Bowl selections, Michael Turner and Ovie Mughelli. While on staff with the Falcons, the team won NFC South Championships in 2010 and 2012, and achieved five straight winning seasons, with playoff appearances in four of seven seasons.

Brown has logged 22 years in coaching, including six seasons at Indiana University. In his first five seasons at Indiana, Hoosier running backs averaged 1,549 rushing yards per season. In his first year, Indiana gained 1,398 yards despite not having a running back with more than 90 career carries entering the 2002 season. In 2003, Ben Jarvus Green-Ellis became the seventh true freshman in Indiana history to rush for 100 yards in a game and just the third freshman to reach the 200-yard plateau in a single-game.

A native of Sweetwater, Tennessee, and a graduate of the University of Memphis, Brown coached at the University of Tennessee from 1983 to 1988, initially as a graduate assistant, and afterward as an administrative assistant and scout. Coaches he worked with during his time with the Vols included Johnny Majors, Phillip Fulmer, David Cutcliffe, Jon Gruden, Ron Zook, Kevin Steele, and his older brother, Kippy Brown. He was running backs coach of the XFL's Memphis Maniax during the league's lone season in 2001.

Brown is divorced and has one daughter, Caitlin.
