= Shane Halter =

American baseball player (born 1969)

- Utility player
- Born: November 8, 1969 (age 56); La Plata, Maryland, U.S.
- Batted: Right Threw: Right

MLB debut
- April 6, 1997, for the Kansas City Royals

Last MLB appearance
- October 3, 2004, for the Anaheim Angels

MLB statistics
- Batting average: .246
- Home runs: 45
- Runs batted in: 197
- Stats at Baseball Reference

Teams
- Kansas City Royals (1997–1998); New York Mets (1999); Detroit Tigers (2000–2003); Anaheim Angels (2004)

Shane David Halter (born November 8, 1969) is an American former Major League Baseball utility player.

== Early life ==
Halter attended Hooks High School in Hooks, Texas and was a letterman in football, basketball, baseball, track, and golf. Halter played for the Norfolk Tides, a minor league baseball team located in Norfolk, Virginia.

== Major League Baseball career ==
Halter played for the Kansas City Royals (1997–1998), New York Mets (1999), Detroit Tigers (2000–2003), and Anaheim Angels (2004). Although he was essentially a backup player, he had notable power and he was adequate defensively in all infield and outfield positions.

On October 1, 2000, Halter showed his versatility by playing all nine positions in a single game, joining Bert Campaneris (Kansas City Athletics, September 8, 1965), César Tovar (Minnesota Twins, September 22, 1968), Scott Sheldon (Texas Rangers, September 6, 2000), and Andrew Romine (Detroit Tigers, September 30, 2017), in the select list of players to play all nine positions in a Major League game. Halter went 4 for 5 at the plate with 3 RBI, and also scored the game-winning run against the Minnesota Twins in the bottom of the ninth.

In his 644-game career, Halter batted .246, with 45 home runs and 197 runs batted in.
