= Bill Dupes =

American football player and coach (1929–2011)

Biographical details
- Born: October 8, 1929; Sweetwater, Tennessee, U.S.
- Died: January 8, 2011 (aged 81); Knoxville, Tennessee, U.S.

Playing career
- 1949–1951: Tennessee Tech
- Positions: Fullback, center, guard, linebacker

Coaching career (HC unless noted)
- 1954–1961: Tennessee Tech (assistant)
- 1962: Millsaps
- 1963–1972: Austin Peay
- 1976–1982: Tennessee Military Institute
- 1983–1998: Sweetwater HS (TN)

Head coaching record
- Overall: 43–62–4 (college)

Accomplishments and honors

Awards
- OVC Coach of the Year (1964)

William Donald Dupes (October 9, 1929 – January 8, 2011) was an American football player and coach. He served as the head football coach at Millsaps College in Jackson, Mississippi in 1962 and at Austin Peay State University from 1963 to 1972, compiling a career college football coaching record of 43–62–4.

== Head coaching record ==
=== College ===
Year	Team	Overall	Conference	Standing	Bowl/playoffs
Millsaps Majors () (1962)
1962	Millsaps	3–4–2			
Austin Peay Governors (Ohio Valley Conference) (1963–1972)
1963	Austin Peay	1–9	0–7	8th	
1964	Austin Peay	8–1–1	5–1–1	2nd	
1965	Austin Peay	8–1	6–1	2nd	
1966	Austin Peay	6–4	4–3	T–3rd	
1967	Austin Peay	2–8	2–5	T–7th	
1968	Austin Peay	5–5	3–4	5th	
1969	Austin Peay	2–7–1	2–5	7th	
1970	Austin Peay	3–7	2–5	T–6th	
1971	Austin Peay	2–8	1–6	7th	
1972	Austin Peay	3–8	1–6	8th	
Austin Peay:		40–58–2	26–43–1		
Total:		43–62–4			
