= Beau Morgan =

American football player (born 1975)

No. 32
- Position: Running back

Personal information
- Born: August 4, 1975 (age 51); Nacogdoches, Texas, U.S.
- Listed height: 5 ft 10 in (1.78 m)
- Listed weight: 192 lb (87 kg)

Career information
- High school: Trinity Christian Academy (Addison, Texas)
- College: Air Force
- NFL draft: 1997: undrafted

Career history
- Dallas Cowboys (1997–1999)*; Memphis Maniax (2001)
- * Offseason or practice squad member only

Awards and highlights
- Third-team All-American (1996); 2× All-WAC (1995, 1996); WAC Pacific Division Offensive Player of the Year (1996)

Career XFL statistics
- Games played: 10

Beau Martin Morgan (born August 4, 1975) is an American former professional football player who was a running back in the National Football League (NFL) for the Dallas Cowboys. He also was a member of the Memphis Maniax in the XFL. He played college football for the Air Force Falcons, earning third-team All-American honors in 1996.

== Early life ==
Morgan attended Trinity Christian Academy, where he was coached by his father Barry. He was the starter at quarterback in a pro-style offense that also featured QB option runs and rollout passes that took advantage of his elite running ability.

He led the school to two consecutive state championships as a junior and senior, while being named MVP of both championship games. He finished with 5,000 passing yards and 70 passing touchdowns, while rushing for 2,200 yards and 25 rushing touchdowns. He also practiced track, where he recorded a best long jump of 23' 6 3/4" and 100 meter time of 10.8. Morgan finished 3rd at the Texas Relays in the long jump his senior year.

== College career ==
Morgan accepted a football scholarship from the United States Air Force Academy, after most schools viewed him as an athlete more than a quarterback during his recruiting process. Although he saw no varsity playing time during his freshman season, he did start 5 games for the program's junior varsity team.

As a sophomore, he became the starter for the final 3 games at quarterback, after Preston McConnell suffered a separated right shoulder against the United States Military Academy. He rushed 140 times for 600 yards and 5 rushing touchdowns, while completing 41-of-89 passes for 873 yards and 5 passing touchdowns. His first start was a win in Colorado Springs against #10 ranked Utah, 44-38.

As a junior, he rushed 229 times for 1,285 yards (fourth in school history) and 19 rushing touchdowns (second in school history), while completing 90-of-169 passes for 1,165 yards and 12 passing touchdowns (fourth in school history). His 31 total touchdowns were a school record. He also became the eighth player in NCAA history to both pass (1,165) and rush (1,285) for more than 1,000 yards in a single-season.

As a senior, he rushed 225 times for 1,498 yards and 18 rushing touchdowns, while completing 95-of-180 passes for 1,210 yards and 8 passing touchdowns. He finished tenth in the Heisman Trophy voting. His 1,498 rushing yards set an NCAA Division I single-season-record for quarterbacks. He became the first player in NCAA history to pass and rush for over 1,000 yards in two different seasons. He also became the second player (Brian Mitchell was the first) in NCAA history to both pass (3,248) and rush (3,379) for more than 3,000 yards in a career. Against the University of Notre Dame, he rushed for 183 yards to lead his team to a 20-17 overtime upset win against the #8 ranked Irish. Against Colorado State University, he rushed for 243 yards (second in school history).

He finished his college career with 594 carries for 3,379 yards (second in school history), 42 rushing touchdowns (school record), 3,248 passing yards (fifth in school history), 25 passing touchdowns (third in school history), 6,627 total offense yards (school record), 67 total touchdowns (school record) and 252 points (tied school record).

=== Statistics ===
Season	Team	Games			Passing								Rushing			
Season	Team	GP	GS	Record	Cmp	Att	Pct	Yds	Y/A	TD	Int	Rtg	Att	Yds	Avg	TD
1993	Air Force	0	0	—	DNP											
1994	Air Force	12	3	2–1	41	89	46.1	873	9.8	5	2	142.5	140	600	4.3	5
1995	Air Force	12	12	8–4	90	169	53.3	1,165	6.9	12	7	126.3	229	1,285	5.6	19
1996	Air Force	11	11	6−5	95	180	52.8	1,210	6.7	8	6	117.2	225	1,494	6.6	18
Career		35	26	16−10	226	438	51.6	3,248	7.4	25	15	125.9	594	3,379	5.7	42
Bowl games		1	1	0–1	5	11	45.5	51	4.6	0	0	84.4	22	159	5.9	1

== Professional career ==
=== Dallas Cowboys ===
Morgan was signed as an undrafted free agent by the Dallas Cowboys after the 1997 NFL draft on April 25. He dropped because of his two-year military commitment with the United States Air Force and the lack of a defined playing position. He was converted into a running back during training camp. He played in the preseason opener against the Oakland Raiders, making 3 receptions for 12 yards and 8 carries for 8 yards. He spent just over 2 weeks with the team and was placed on the reserve/military list on August 4.

In 1998, he spent 3 weeks in training camp. In the preseason opener against the Seattle Seahawks, he had 16 carries for 53 yards (led the team), 2 receptions for 21 yards and a 24-yard kickoff return. In the second preseason game against the Oakland Raiders, he rushed 5 times for 27 yards (led the team). He was placed on the reserve/military list on August 12.

In 1999, he was released before the start of the season on September 5 and signed to the practice squad on September 7. He was placed on the injured reserve list with a foot injury on October 16.

In 2000, he was moved to safety during the preseason. He was released before the start of the season on July 13.

=== Memphis Maniax (XFL) ===
Morgan signed with the Memphis Maniax of the XFL for its lone season in 2001. He was the third-string quarterback behind Jim Druckenmiller and Marcus Crandell, but mostly played running back and wide receiver. He led the team in special teams tackles on the season, and he collected 17 carries for 37 yards, 10 receptions for 82 yards and 2 receiving touchdowns.

== Personal life ==
In 1997, he fulfilled his military obligation by serving as an assistant football coach at the United States Air Force Academy. In 1998, he fulfilled his military obligation by serving as a public affairs officer at Peterson Air Force Base.

His brother Blane was also a starting quarterback for the United States Air Force Academy and would later become an assistant football coach at the school.
