= Ketric Sanford =

American football player (born 1978)

No. 26
- Position: Running back

Personal information
- Born: July 6, 1978 (age 48); Corsicana, Texas, U.S.
- Listed height: 5 ft 8 in (1.73 m)
- Listed weight: 207 lb (94 kg)

Career information
- High school: Corsicana (TX)
- College: Houston
- NFL draft: 2000: undrafted

Career history
- Memphis Maniax (2001)

Awards and highlights
- First-team All-C-USA (1999); 3x Second-team All-C-USA (1996–1998)

Ketric Sanford (born July 6, 1978) is an American former football running back.

A native of Corsicana, Texas, Sanford played high school football at Corsicana High School under coach Tom Wilson from 1993 to 1995. Sanford carried the ball 1,058 times and, as of 2020, was sixth all-time in Texas high school football behind Johnathan Gray, Jacquizz Rodgers, Robert Strait, Billy Sims, and Eno Benjamin. During the 1994 season he carried the ball 475 times, setting a state record for rushing attempts in a single season that held until 2010.

He played collegiately at the University of Houston, where he finished his career as the Cougars’ all-time leading rusher with 3,636 yards, rushing touchdowns and all-purpose yards. As a senior, he was given an honorable mention All-America choice by College Football News, as well as a first-team All-Conference USA selection. Sanford first topped the 1,000-yard mark as a junior with 1,054 rushing yards.

Sanford was undrafted in the 2000 NFL draft and played the 2001 season for the Memphis Maniax.
