= John Williams (defensive back, born 1974) =

American football player (born 1974)

No. 36, 21, 11
- Position: Cornerback

Personal information
- Born: July 26, 1974 (age 52); Hammond, Louisiana, U.S.
- Listed height: 5 ft 7 in (1.70 m)
- Listed weight: 180 lb (82 kg)

Career information
- High school: Hammond High School
- College: Southern
- NFL draft: 1997: undrafted

Career history
- Baltimore Ravens (1997–1998); → Berlin Thunder (1999); Chicago Bears (2000)*; Memphis Maniax (2001); Nashville Kats (2001); Tampa Bay Storm (2002–2003); Detroit Fury (2004)
- * Offseason or practice squad member only
- Stats at Pro Football Reference
- Stats at ArenaFan.com

John Wesley Williams (born July 26, 1974) is an American former professional football player who was a cornerback for the Baltimore Ravens of the National Football League (NFL). He played college football for the Southern Jaguars. He also played in NFL Europe, the XFL, and the Arena Football League (AFL).

== Early life ==
John Wesley Williams was born on July 26, 1974, in Hammond, Louisiana. He attended Hammond High School.

== College career ==
Williams enrolled at Southern University to play college football for the Jaguars. He was a member of the team from 1993 to 1996.

== Professional career ==
After going undrafted in the 1997 NFL draft, Williams signed with the Baltimore Ravens on April 25. He was released on August 24 and signed to the practice squad on August 26. He was promoted to the active roster on November 26. He played in the final four games of the 1997 regular season as a reserve cornerback and special teams player, posting one solo tackle and two assisted tackles. Williams appeared in all 16 games in 1998, recording one fumble recovery. In 1999, the Ravens allocated Williams to NFL Europe to play for the Berlin Thunder. During the 1999 NFL Europe season, he totaled 39 tackles on defense, six special teams tackles, two interceptions, five pass breakups, four kickoff returns for 75 yards, and one punt return for 14 yards. He was released by Baltimore on September 5, 1999, after the final preseason game.

Williams was signed by the Chicago Bears on February 3, 2000. He was released on July 26, 2000.

Williams started all ten games for the Memphis Maniax of the XFL in 2001, totaling 38 tackles, two interceptions for 35 yards, and two kickoff returns for 21 yards. The XFL had a rule allowing nicknames to be worn on the back of players' jerseys instead of their legal names. Williams wore the name "Christian" on his jersey. The Maniax finished the year with a 5–5 record.

Williams signed with the Nashville Kats of the Arena Football League (AFL) on April 10, 2001. The AFL played under ironman rules, where most players were required to play both offense and defense. However, Williams was designated as a defensive specialist, meaning he only played defense. He appeared in two games for the Kats during the 2001 AFL season, accumulating eight solo tackles, three assisted tackles, and three pass breakups. He was placed on injured reserve on April 24, 2001.

Williams signed with the AFL's Tampa Bay Storm on May 8, 2002. He was placed on injured reserve on June 13 and activated on June 28. He played in nine games, starting six, overall for the Storm in 2002, totaling 39 solo tackles, 20 assisted tackles, one interception, eight pass breakups, two forced fumbles, and one fumble recovery. He was placed on injured reserve again on March 27, 2003, missing the entire 2003 season.

On December 19, 2003, Williams was signed by the Detroit Fury of the AFL for the 2004 season. He was placed on injured reserve on March 15 and activated on April 9. He played in 13 games in 2004, recording 29 solo tackles, 16 assisted tackles, one interception, and two pass breakups.

== Personal life ==
Williams became an ordained gospel minister on July 28, 1996. His younger brother, Brock Williams, also played in the NFL.
