= 1999 NFL expansion draft =

Selection of players for the Cleveland Browns

General information
- Sport: American football
- Date: February 9, 1999
- Location: Pro Football Hall of Fame; Canton, Ohio

Overview
- League: NFL
- Expansion teams: Cleveland Browns (reactivated team)
- Expansion season: 1999

The Cleveland Browns had spent three years with its operations suspended after Art Modell had relocated the Browns' organization and players to Baltimore, Maryland to form the Baltimore Ravens at the end of the 1995 NFL season. Upon returning to the league, in order to become competitive with existing teams, the Browns were awarded the first pick in the 1999 NFL draft, and the league gave the Browns the opportunity to select current players from the other teams. That selection was provided by the 1999 National Football League expansion draft, held on February 9, 1999. 150 players were left unprotected by their teams for the Browns to draft.

== Format ==
Each of the 30 existing teams were required to expose five players to the draft. Cleveland was allowed to select between 30 and 42 players. No more than two players could be drafted from a single team; after drafting one player from a team, that team had the option to remove up to two of the remaining four players from the draft pool.

== Reception ==
Three years later The New York Times said that the Houston Texans would use the 1999 draft as an example of what not to do in the 2002 NFL expansion draft: "The Browns went for the usual mix of promising young players and veterans who were not over the hill. Apparently, Cleveland did not draft much of either. Only three of the 37 players the Browns took are still with the team and they all play on special teams." The team had the opportunity to draft quarterback Kurt Warner, that 1999 season's eventual NFL MVP and Super Bowl champion, but declined to do so. However, prior to the 1999 season Warner had not yet started an NFL game and only had four completions in 11 passing attempts in the league.

== Player selections ==
Pick	Player	Position	Original NFL team
1	Jim Pyne	C	Detroit Lions
2	Hurvin McCormack	DE	Dallas Cowboys
3	Scott Rehberg	OT	New England Patriots
4	Damon Gibson	WR	Cincinnati Bengals
5	Steve Gordon	C	San Francisco 49ers
6	Tarek Saleh	LB	Carolina Panthers
7	Jeff Buckey	G	Miami Dolphins
8	Jason Kyle	LS	Seattle Seahawks
9	Rod Manuel	DE	Pittsburgh Steelers
10	Lenoy Jones	LB	Tennessee Titans
11	Tim McTyer	CB	Philadelphia Eagles
12	Elijah Alexander	LB	Indianapolis Colts
13	Pete Swanson	OT	Kansas City Chiefs
14	Gerome Williams	S	San Diego Chargers
15	Marlon Forbes	S	Chicago Bears
16	Justin Armour	WR	Denver Broncos
17	Paul Wiggins	OT	Washington Redskins
18	Duane Butler	S	Minnesota Vikings
19	Fred Brock	WR	Arizona Cardinals
20	Kory Blackwell	CB	New York Giants
21	Kevin Devine	CB	Jacksonville Jaguars
22	Raymond Jackson	CB	Buffalo Bills
23	Jim Bundren	G	New York Jets
24	Ben Cavil	G	Baltimore Ravens
25	Michael Blair	RB	Green Bay Packers
26	Antonio Anderson	DT	Dallas Cowboys
27	Orlando Bobo	G	Minnesota Vikings
28	James Williams	LB	San Francisco 49ers
29	Scott Milanovich	QB	Tampa Bay Buccaneers
30	Eric Stokes	S	Seattle Seahawks
31	Ronald Moore	RB	Miami Dolphins
32	Clarence Williams	RB	Buffalo Bills
33	Freddie Solomon	WR	Philadelphia Eagles
34	Brandon Sanders	S	New York Giants
35	Mike Thompson	NT	Cincinnati Bengals
36	Jerris McPhail	RB	Detroit Lions
37	Antonio Langham	CB	San Francisco 49ers
