= Hooks High School =

Location
- 401 Avenue A Hooks, Bowie County, Texas 75561; United States; 33.467681°N 94.284403°W

Information
- School type: Public, high school
- Locale: Town: Fringe
- School district: Hooks ISD
- NCES School ID: 482349002382
- Principal: Beverly Shannon
- Teaching staff: 30.78 (on an FTE basis)
- Grades: 9‍–‍12
- Enrollment: 309 (2023‍–‍2024)
- Student to teacher ratio: 10.04
- Colors: Blue and White
- Team name: Hornets
- Website: Official website

Hooks High School is a public high school located in Hooks, Texas. It is the sole high school in the Hooks Independent School District and is classified as a 3A school by the University Interscholastic League (UIL). During 2022‍–‍2023, Hooks High School had an enrollment of 319 students and a student to teacher ratio of 10.97. The school received an overall rating of "B" from the Texas Education Agency for the 2024‍–‍2025 school year

== Athletics ==
The Hooks Hornets compete in the following sports:

- Baseball
- Basketball
- Cross Country
- Football
- Golf
- Powerlifting
- Softball
- Tennis
- Track and Field
- Volleyball

== Notable alumni ==
Billy Sims – NFL running back

Jeremiah Trotter - NFL linebacker
