= Eric Stokes (American football executive) =

American football scout and executive (born 1973)

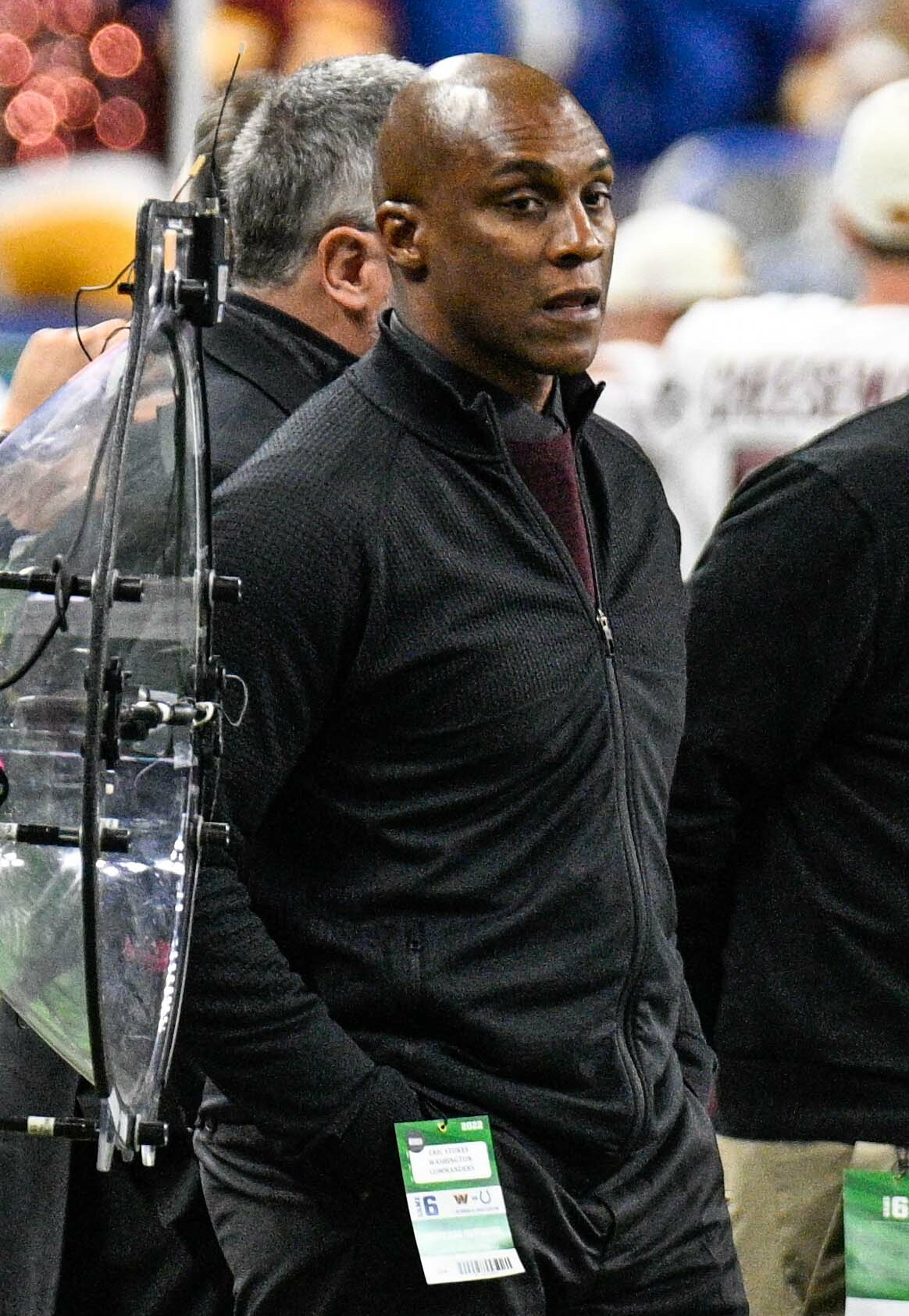
- Stokes in 2022

No. 37 – Seattle Seahawks
- Title: West Coast Area Scout

Personal information
- Born: December 18, 1973 (age 52); Lincoln, Nebraska, U.S.
- Listed height: 5 ft 11 in (1.80 m)
- Listed weight: 200 lb (91 kg)

Career information
- High school: Lincoln East (Lincoln)
- College: Nebraska (1992–1996)
- NFL draft: 1997: 5th round, 142nd overall pick
- Expansion draft: 1999: 1st round, 30th overall pick

Career history

Playing
- Seattle Seahawks (1997–1998); Cleveland Browns (1999)*
- * Offseason or practice squad member only

Operations
- Seattle Seahawks (2000–2001) Scout; Seattle Seahawks (2002–2004) Pro personnel assistant; Seattle Seahawks (2005–2009) Scout; Seattle Seahawks (2010–2011) Assistant director of college scouting; Tampa Bay Buccaneers (2012–2013) Director of college scouting; Miami Dolphins (2014–2015) Assistant general manager; Carolina Panthers (2016–2019) Director of college scouting; Washington Football Team/Washington Commanders (2020-2023); Director of pro personnel (2020); Senior director of player personnel (2021-2023); Seattle Seahawks (2026-present) West coast area scout

Awards and highlights
- 2× CFB national champion (1994, 1995)

Career NFL statistics
- Tackles: 11
- Stats at Pro Football Reference

Eric Stokes (born December 18, 1973) is an American football scout and executive who currently serves as a West Coast area scout for the Seattle Seahawks of the National Football League (NFL). He played college football for the Nebraska Cornhuskers, winning two National championships. He was selected by the Seahawks in the fifth round of the 1997 NFL draft, playing two seasons for the team.

== Career ==
Stokes played college football for the Nebraska Cornhuskers, winning two National championships prior to being drafted by the Seattle Seahawks in the fifth round of the 1997 NFL draft. He played safety for them for two seasons and was selected by the Cleveland Browns in the 1999 expansion draft before suffering an injury and retiring.

In 2000, Stokes rejoined the Seahawks as a scout and worked in other personnel roles with them for a decade. He held other executive roles with the Tampa Bay Buccaneers, Miami Dolphins, and Carolina Panthers throughout the 2010s. In 2020, Stokes was named director of pro personnel for the Washington Football Team and was promoted to senior director of player personnel the following year. His contract was not renewed for the 2024 season.

In early 2026, Stokes worked as a Football Evaluation Specialist for SūmerSports, and is a featured scout in SūmerSports’ NFL draft evaluation show, THE EVALUATION.

On July 9, 2026, the Seattle Seahawks hired Stokes as a West Coast area scout.
