= Marcus Wimberly =

American football player (born 1974)

No. 48, 24
- Position: Defensive back

Personal information
- Born: July 8, 1974 (age 52); Memphis, Tennessee, U.S.
- Listed height: 5 ft 11 in (1.80 m)
- Listed weight: 192 lb (87 kg)

Career information
- High school: East (Memphis)
- College: Miami (FL)
- NFL draft: 1997: 5th round, 133rd overall pick

Career history
- Atlanta Falcons (1997); Philadelphia Eagles (1998)*; Miami Dolphins (1999)*; Memphis Maniax (2001)
- * Offseason or practice squad member only
- Stats at Pro Football Reference

Marcus Wimberly (born July 8, 1974) is an American former professional football defensive back. He was selected in the fifth round of the 1997 NFL draft with the 133rd overall pick. He played for the Atlanta Falcons in 1997 and the Memphis Maniax in 2001. Wimberly is currently the head coach of Orange Park High School in Orange Park, Florida.
