= Rafael Cooper =

American football player (born 1975)

No. 23
- Position: Running back

Personal information
- Born: January 8, 1975 (age 51); Detroit, Michigan
- Listed height: 5 ft 11 in (1.80 m)
- Listed weight: 205 lb (93 kg)

Career information
- High school: Chadsey High School (Detroit, Michigan)
- College: Minnesota (1994–1995); Louisville (1998)
- NFL draft: 2000: undrafted

Career history
- Erie Invaders (2000); Green Bay Packers (2000–2001)*; Memphis Maniax (2001); Tennessee Titans (2001-2002)*; Amsterdam Admirals (2002); Detroit Lions (2002); Myrtle Beach Stingrays (2003)
- * Offseason or practice squad member only
- Stats at Pro Football Reference

Rafael Cooper (born January 8, 1975) is an American former football running back who played with the Erie Invaders of the Indoor Football League, Detroit Lions of the NFL, Memphis Maniax of the XFL, and the Amsterdam Admirals of NFL Europe. He finished his professional football career by playing with the Myrtle Beach Stingrays of the National Indoor Football League in 2003. He played college football at Minnesota and Louisville.
