= Brock Williams =

American football player (born 1979)

No. 28, 22, 29
- Positions: Cornerback, safety

Personal information
- Born: August 11, 1979 (age 47); Hammond, Louisiana, U.S.
- Listed height: 5 ft 10 in (1.78 m)
- Listed weight: 195 lb (88 kg)

Career information
- High school: Hammond
- College: Notre Dame
- NFL draft: 2001: 3rd round, 86th overall pick

Career history
- New England Patriots (2001–2002); Oakland Raiders (2002–2003)*; Chicago Bears (2003); Oakland Raiders (2004)
- * Offseason or practice squad member only

Awards and highlights
- Super Bowl champion (XXXVI)

Career NFL statistics
- Games played: 12
- Tackles: 10
- Stats at Pro Football Reference

Brock Williams (born August 11, 1979) is an American former professional football player who was a cornerback in the National Football League (NFL). He was selected by the New England Patriots in the third round of the 2001 NFL draft. Later, he won Super Bowl XXXVI with the team. He played college football for the Notre Dame Fighting Irish.

Williams was also a member of the Oakland Raiders and Chicago Bears.

== Early life ==
Williams was born on August 11, 1979, in Hammond, Louisiana. He was one of five children and his brother John Williams, Jr. played at Southern.

Williams attended Hammond High School where as a junior he recorded 55 tackles and five interceptions in 1995. As a senior in 1997 he had 102 tackles and 15 pass deflections. He was named to the Super Southern 100 by the Atlanta Journal-Constitution and a third-team pick on the All-South team by Fox Sports South. The coaches in the Louisiana area also chose Williams as district MVP after he played running back, cornerback and returned kicks.

== College career ==
Williams attended the University of Notre Dame and majored in sociology. As a freshman in 1997, he played in eight games making 97 appearances on special teams. For the first time in his college career he played cornerback against Pittsburgh. He broke into the starting lineup against Purdue in week four and played in all 12 of the Irish's games. He had eight tackles against Stanford, six against Boston College and seven against LSU. After not playing in 1999 as a junior, he was named the Irish's starting left cornerback in 2000. He led defenders in playing time during 2000 and played in all 13 games which included the Tostitos Fiesta Bowl game against Oregon State. Williams made three tackles against Texas A&M, eight tackles against Michigan State and had seven tackles against Stanford, a game in which he recorded his first sack.

== Professional career ==
=== New England Patriots ===
Williams was drafted by the New England Patriots in the third round of the 2001 NFL draft. As a rookie, Williams tore his anterior cruciate ligament and was placed on injured reserve after being active for only one game but not playing. In 2002, Williams was hampered by an ankle injury throughout the offseason and was eventually released on September 1, 2002. On September 3, 2002, Williams was re-signed to the Patriots practice squad before being released on October 22.

=== Oakland Raiders (first stint) ===
On October 24, 2002, Williams was signed to the Oakland Raiders practice squad. But after suffering a knee injury, Williams was released from the practice squad on November 19. He was re-signed by the Raiders during the 2003 offseason. On August 28, 2003, Williams was once again released by the Raiders.

=== Chicago Bears ===
Shortly after his release, Williams signed with the Chicago Bears. In 2003, he played in 10 games for the Bears. Williams was released on August 26, 2004.

=== Oakland Raiders (second stint) ===
Williams was re-signed by the Oakland Raiders on October 20, 2004. He was waived on October 27. He was re-signed to the Raiders active roster on December 21, 2004. After spending the 2005 offseason, Williams was released at the end of training camp on August 29, 2005.

== Post-football ==
Williams pawned his Super Bowl ring for $2,600 at the Gold & Silver Pawn Shop that is now featured on the TV series Pawn Stars and never picked it back up. Williams was offered $15,000 to sell the ring but declined. It is listed for sale at the pawn shop for $100,000.
