= Kippy Brown =

American football player and coach (1955–2026)

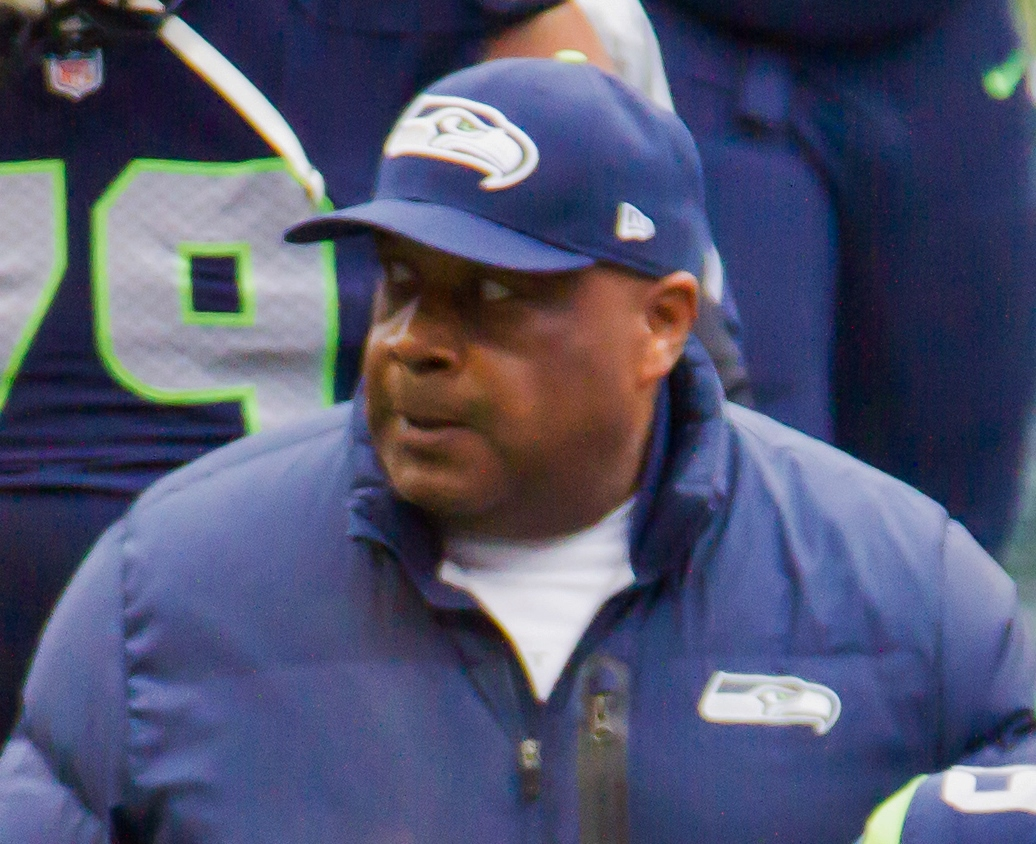
- Brown in 2013

Personal information
- Born: March 6, 1955; Sweetwater, Tennessee, U.S.
- Died: August 31, 2026 (aged 71)

Career information
- High school: Sweetwater
- College: Memphis

Career history
- Memphis State (1978–1980) Running backs coach & wide receivers coach; Louisville (1982) Wide receivers coach; Tennessee (1983–1989) Wide receivers coach; New York Jets (1990–1992) Running backs coach; Tennessee (1993–1994) Wide receivers coach; Tampa Bay Buccaneers (1995) Running backs coach; Miami Dolphins (1997) Running backs coach; Miami Dolphins (1998–1999) Offensive coordinator; Green Bay Packers (2000) Running backs coach; Memphis Maniax (2001) Head coach; Houston Texans (2002–2005) Wide receivers coach; Detroit Lions (2006–2007) Wide receivers coach; Detroit Lions (2008) Associate head coach & passing game coordinator; Tennessee (2009) Wide receivers coach; Seattle Seahawks (2010–2014) Wide receivers coach

Awards and highlights
- Super Bowl champion (XLVIII)

Head coaching record
- Regular season: XFL: 5–5 (.500)
- Coaching profile at Pro Football Reference

Charles Henry "Kippy" Brown (March 6, 1955 – August 2026) was an American football player and coach. He was a college-level starting quarterback for Memphis and coached in various capacities at both the college and professional levels of American football. Brown retired in May 2015.

== Playing career ==
Kippy Brown began his football career at Sweetwater High School in Sweetwater, Tennessee, under long-time Sweetwater coach King Berrong (1925–2013). He led Sweetwater to the 1971 and 1972 state championships, and helped the team lead the state in scoring in 1972 and 1973.

Following his high school career, Brown attended Memphis State University (now known as University of Memphis) where he was quarterback for the Tigers from 1975 to 1977. Notably, Brown's Tigers upset seventh-ranked Auburn University 31–20 in 1975. Brown engineered this victory by completing 7 of 11 passes for 103 yards and two touchdowns, including a 37-yard strike to Keith Wright in the fourth quarter that put the game out of reach.

== Coaching career ==
=== 1978–1999 ===
After graduating from MSU in 1977 with a B.A. in Communications, Brown switched gears from playing to coaching at his alma mater and served as running backs coach in 1978 under head coach Richard Williamson and receivers coach from 1979 to 1980.

After coaching two years with the Tigers, he moved to Louisville, Kentucky to coach receivers at the University of Louisville (U of L) Cardinals for the 1982 campaign. One of his pupils was Mark Clayton, who would go on to become a five-time Pro Bowl receiver for the Miami Dolphins from 1983 to 1992.

Following the 1982 season at U of L, Brown returned to his roots in the state of Tennessee helping coach the Johnny Majors-run University of Tennessee Volunteers football team. During his first stint with the Vols from 1983 to 1989, Brown helped Tennessee acquire the nickname "Wide Receiver U.," coaching numerous pass catchers to greatness. Receivers Lenny Taylor, Clyde Duncan, Tim McGee, Joey Clinkscales, Anthony Miller, Alvin Harper, Anthony Morgan, and Carl Pickens all benefited from Brown's tutelage prior to their joining the professional ranks.

Brown caught the attention of the New York Jets while with Tennessee and coached for the Jets from 1990 to 1992. While with the Jets in 1991, he coached running backs for New York head coach Bruce Coslet and saw his backs rank fifth in the NFL in rushing. That 1991 squad also returned to the playoffs for the first time since 1986.

He later returned to Tennessee when the Vols' new head coach Phillip Fulmer convinced him to return to the collegiate ranks as assistant head coach and wide receivers coach for two seasons (1993–1994). He brought an offensive flair from the professional ranks to the UT offensive package as the Vols compiled an 18–6 record and outscored their opponents 847–383 over the course of those two years. Receivers he worked with during this period included Cory Fleming, Billy Williams, Joey Kent, and Marcus Nash. A young Peyton Manning also benefited from Brown's guidance during his freshman campaign as the Vols' signal caller.

Following a highly successful 1994 Tennessee season, Brown was again called to the pro ranks, joining Tampa Bay Buccaneers in 1995. Then-Tampa Bay head coach Sam Wyche named Brown running backs coach stating, "Getting Kippy is a major coup for us." While in Tampa, he also worked closely with former Bucs head coach and former head coach of the Indianapolis Colts, Tony Dungy.

From 1996 to 1999, he was on Jimmy Johnson's Miami Dolphins coaching staff, where he was the offensive coordinator from 1998 to 1999 and the running backs coach from 1996 to 1997. In 1996, Brown helped running back Karim Abdul-Jabbar become the first Dolphins running back to reach 1,000 yards in 18 years, and in 1997, Abdul-Jabbar tied a league-high 15 rushing touchdowns.

=== 2000–2015 ===
In 2000, Brown joined the Green Bay Packers as running backs coach under head coach Mike Sherman. Following the creation of the XFL in 2001, Brown took command of his hometown Memphis Maniax finishing the year 5–5; second in the Western Division and was the only team to defeat eventual XFL champions Los Angeles Xtreme twice. The team disbanded after one year as the XFL league collapsed.

After the demise of the XFL, Brown spent four seasons as the Houston Texans wide receivers coach. Among his pupils in Texas was WR Andre Johnson, who was taken by Houston with the third overall pick in the 2003 draft. Johnson became the first Texans offensive player to earn a trip to the Pro Bowl, selected for his outstanding 2004 season that included club records of 79 receptions for 1,129 yards.

Brown arrived in Detroit, Michigan for the 2006 season with the Detroit Lions. There, he reunited with Larry Beightol, with whom Brown worked on the New York Jets in 1990–92, Miami in 1996–98 and Green Bay Packers in 2000. For the 2008 Season, Brown served as assistant head coach and passing game coordinator.

On December 17, 2009, Brown accepted an offer from University of Tennessee head coach Lane Kiffin to coach wide receivers and also become their passing game coordinator. This appointment was brief, however, as within a few weeks Kiffin resigned to become head coach at Southern Cal. Brown was named the Vols' interim head coach, and expressed interest in becoming head coach permanently, but the university hired Derek Dooley. On January 16, 2010, after not being named Kiffin's successor, he left to join Pete Carroll's staff as wide receivers coach of the Seattle Seahawks. He won his first Super Bowl title when the Seahawks defeated the Denver Broncos in Super Bowl XLVIII. Brown retired in March 2015.

In June 2014, Brown's hometown of Sweetwater named the road circling Sweetwater High School "Kippy Brown Way."

== Personal life and death ==
Brown was born on March 6, 1955. He and his wife, Deon (Wilson), were married in Memphis in 1974. Deon is a native Memphian who taught locally at Craigmont High School from 1978 to 1981. The couple had two children, Jerome (born 1975), and Jennifer (born 1980). Jerome earned a basketball scholarship at the University of Tennessee under former Vol head coach Wade Houston, and competed on the Buy.com golf tour. Jennifer studied at Spelman College in Atlanta, Georgia.

He was the older brother of former Atlanta Falcons running backs coach Gerald Brown.

Brown died in August 2026, at the age of 71.

== Head coaching record ==
=== XFL ===
Team	Year	Regular season					Postseason			
Team	Year	Won	Lost	Ties	Win %	Finish	Won	Lost	Win %	Result
MEM	2001	5	5	0	.500	3rd in Western Division	did not qualify			
Total		5	5	0	.500		0	0	.000	
