= Charles Jordan (American football) =

American football player (born 1969)

No. 80, 85, 82, 88
- Position: Wide receiver

Personal information
- Born: October 9, 1969 (age 57); Los Angeles, California, U.S.
- Listed height: 5 ft 11 in (1.80 m)
- Listed weight: 185 lb (84 kg)

Career information
- High school: Morningside (Inglewood, California)
- College: Long Beach City College
- NFL draft: 1993: undrafted

Career history
- Los Angeles Raiders (1993); Green Bay Packers (1994–1995); Miami Dolphins (1996–1998); Seattle Seahawks (1999); Green Bay Packers (1999); Memphis Maniax (2001)

Career NFL statistics
- Receptions: 46
- Receiving yards: 817
- Receiving touchdowns: 5
- Stats at Pro Football Reference

Charles Alexander Jordan (born October 9, 1969) is an American former professional football player who was a wide receiver for seven seasons in the National Football League (NFL) from 1993 to 1999. He also played in the XFL.

== Early life ==
Jordan was born in Los Angeles, California, USA. His parents are Charles Jordan Sr. and Roxie Jordan. Retired NFL wide receiver Curtis Conway is his cousin.

In addition to playing football at Morningside High School in Inglewood, California, he was a wrestler and a track star. Jordan set a CIF Southern Section 2-A State track record in the 200-meters at 21:59 in 1987, the year he graduated. He planned on playing college football at the University of Utah but felt the student/athlete challenge wasn't a good match, so he enrolled at Long Beach City College in Long Beach, California. Surgery put him on the injured reserve list, and with LBCC running an option offense that didn't match Jordan's talents, he left the program in 1988 with fellow Morningside wide receiver Alex Williams.

Jordan became a member of the Family Swans, a Bloods set. He was shot four times, and he spent time in county jail. At one point, he was charged with murder, though the charges were later dismissed. Jordan also worked as a cook at Little Rascals, his uncle's soul food restaurant in South Central Los Angeles, and assisted at his aunt's beauty salon. Eventually, Jordan decided to return to college and play out his eligibility.

== Career ==
Invited to the Los Angeles Raiders' mini-camp for draft choices in 1993, he made the team, though he didn't play a single game for the Raiders that season. In 1994 and 1995, he played for the Green Bay Packers. In 1996, he was signed by the Miami Dolphins as a restricted free agent, receiving a three-year, $2.6 million contract. Coach Jimmy Johnson cut Jordan in the last of the three seasons following a November 1998 arrest after a nightclub fight that included charges of trespassing, battery on a law enforcement officer, and resisting arrest with and without violence. In his final NFL season, 1999,.he first played for the Seattle Seahawks and then returned to Green Bay. In 2001, he joined the Memphis Maniax, an XFL team.
