= Gerome Williams =

American football player (born 1973)

No. 23
- Position: Safety

Personal information
- Born: July 9, 1973 (age 53); Houston, Texas, U.S.
- Listed height: 6 ft 2 in (1.88 m)
- Listed weight: 210 lb (95 kg)

Career information
- High school: Kempner (Sugar Land, Texas)
- College: Houston
- NFL draft: 1996: undrafted
- Expansion draft: 1999: 1st round, 14th overall pick

Career history
- San Diego Chargers (1997–1998); Cleveland Browns (1999)*
- * Offseason or practice squad member only
- Stats at Pro Football Reference

Meltrix Gerome Williams (born July 9, 1973) is an American former professional football player who was a safety for the San Diego Chargers of the National Football League (NFL) from 1997 to 1998. He played college football for the Houston Cougars.
