= Ben Cavil =

American football player (born 1972)

No. 65, 62, 63
- Position: Guard

Personal information
- Born: January 31, 1972 (age 54); Galveston, Texas, U.S.
- Listed height: 6 ft 2 in (1.88 m)
- Listed weight: 310 lb (141 kg)

Career information
- High school: La Marque (TX)
- College: Oklahoma
- NFL draft: 1995: undrafted
- Expansion draft: 1999: 1st round, 24th overall pick

Career history
- San Diego Chargers (1995–1996)*; Philadelphia Eagles (1996-1997)*; Baltimore Ravens (1997–1998); Cleveland Browns (1999)*; Scottish Claymores (2000); New York/New Jersey Hitmen (2001)
- * Offseason or practice squad member only

Career NFL statistics
- Games played: 31
- Games started: 14
- Stats at Pro Football Reference

Ben Anthony "Honey Buns" Cavil (born January 31, 1972) is an American former professional football player who was a guard for two seasons with the Baltimore Ravens of the National Football League (NFL). He played college football for the Oklahoma Sooners. In addition to Baltimore, Cavil played professionally with the San Diego Chargers, Philadelphia Eagles, Cleveland Browns, Scottish Claymores and New York/New Jersey Hitmen.

== Early life and education ==
Ben Cavil was born on January 31, 1972, in Galveston, Texas. He attended high school at La Marque (TX). Cavil then went to college and played football for the Oklahoma Sooners. He lettered from 1991 to 1994 before being signed by the San Diego Chargers.

== Professional career ==
=== San Diego Chargers ===
Cavil went undrafted in the 1995 NFL draft and was then signed as an undrafted free agent by the San Diego Chargers. He dislocated his wrist in training camp and was subsequently placed on injured reserve, ending his season. He did not make the roster in his second season.

=== Philadelphia Eagles ===
After being released by San Diego, Cavil was signed by the Philadelphia Eagles. He would be released at roster cuts but later signed to the practice squad, where he stayed all season. He was traded to the Baltimore Ravens in exchange for a 7th round draft pick the next year.

=== Baltimore Ravens ===
After being traded, Cavil was able to make the roster of Baltimore. He would then make an appearance in 15 out of 16 games, missing only the final week. He started 8 of those games. He had 4 penalties in the season. The next year Cavil came back and appeared in all 16 games, but only starting 6. Cavil was nicknamed "Honey Buns" by Ravens teammates. He would leave the Ravens the next year after being drafted in the 1999 NFL expansion draft.

=== Cleveland Browns ===
Cavil was then selected in the 1999 NFL expansion draft by the Cleveland Browns. He was released at roster cuts.

=== Scottish Claymores ===
In 2000, Cavil played for the Scottish Claymores of NFL Europe.

=== New York/New Jersey Hitmen ===
His final season was in 2001 with the New York/New Jersey Hitmen of the XFL.

== Personal life ==
After his professional career Cavil worked in real estate. He also enjoyed collecting comic books.
