= Jim Kitts =

American football player (born 1972)

No. 48, 34
- Positions: Fullback, linebacker

Personal information
- Born: December 28, 1972 (age 53); Portsmouth, Virginia, U.S.
- Listed height: 6 ft 2 in (1.88 m)
- Listed weight: 248 lb (112 kg)

Career information
- High school: Great Bridge
- College: Ferrum
- NFL draft: 1995: undrafted

Career history
- Albany Firebirds (1996–1996); Washington Redskins (1996)*; Frankfurt Galaxy (1997); Washington Redskins (1997)*; Green Bay Packers (1997)*; Miami Dolphins (1997); Washington Redskins (1998); Green Bay Packers (1998); Tampa Bay Buccaneers (2000)*; Memphis Maniax (2001)
- * Offseason or practice squad member only
- Stats at Pro Football Reference

James Matthew Kitts (born December 28, 1972) is an American former professional football fullback and linebacker.

Kitts was born in 1972 in Portsmouth, Virginia, and attended Great Bridge High School in Chesapeake, Virginia. He then enrolled at Ferrum College where he played college football from 1990 to 1993.

Kitts also played professional football in the Arena Football League for the Albany Firebirds (1995–1996), in the World League of American Football for the Frankfurt Galaxy, in the National Football League (NFL) for the Miami Dolphins (1997), Washington Redskins (1998), and Green Bay Packers (1998), and in the XFL for the Memphis Maniax in 2001.
