= Roosevelt Potts =

American football player (born 1971)

No. 42, 35
- Position: Fullback

Personal information
- Born: January 8, 1971 (age 55); Rayville, Louisiana, U.S.
- Listed height: 6 ft 0 in (1.83 m)
- Listed weight: 250 lb (113 kg)

Career information
- High school: Rayville
- College: Northeast Louisiana
- NFL draft: 1993: 2nd round, 49th overall pick

Career history
- Indianapolis Colts (1993–1997); Miami Dolphins (1997); Baltimore Ravens (1998); Miami Dolphins (1999)*; Memphis Maniax (2001)
- * Offseason or practice squad member only

Career NFL statistics
- Rushing yards: 1,475
- Rushing average: 4.1
- Receptions: 106
- Receiving yards: 863
- Total touchdowns: 5
- Stats at Pro Football Reference

Roosevelt Bernard Potts (born January 8, 1971) is an American former professional football player who was a fullback in the National Football League (NFL) for six seasons from 1993 to 1998 for the Indianapolis Colts, Miami Dolphins, and Baltimore Ravens. He played college football for the Northeast Louisiana Indians (now Louisiana–Monroe Warhawks). He was selected in the second round of the 1993 NFL draft with the 49th overall pick.

At 6', 267 lbs, Potts was often used in short yardage situations. Career: (ULM Most Rushes record 658, Roosevelt Potts, 1990–92) (ULM most yards gained: Career: 3,061, Roosevelt Potts, 1990–92). During his rookie season with the Colts he rushed for 771 yards, and caught 26 passes. He had one rushing and four receiving touchdowns for his career. Roosevelt Potts graduated from Rayville High School in Rayville Louisiana in 1989.
