= Antonio Anderson (American football) =

American football player and coach (born 1973)

No. 96, 97
- Positions: Defensive tackle, defensive end

Personal information
- Born: June 4, 1973 (age 53); Brooklyn, New York, U.S.
- Listed height: 6 ft 6 in (1.98 m)
- Listed weight: 311 lb (141 kg)

Career information
- High school: Midwood (Brooklyn)
- College: Syracuse
- NFL draft: 1997: 4th round, 101st overall pick
- Expansion draft: 1999: 1st round, 26th overall pick

Career history

Playing
- Dallas Cowboys (1997–1998); Cleveland Browns (1999)*; Carolina Panthers (1999)*; Oakland Raiders (2000)*; Memphis Maniax (2001)
- * Offseason or practice squad member only

Coaching
- Hempstead High School Defensive assistant; Rhein Fire Defensive line assistant; Nassau Community College Defensive line assistant; ASA College Defensive line assistant

Awards and highlights
- PFWA All-Rookie Team (1997); Second-team All-Big East (1996)

Career NFL statistics
- Tackles: 28
- Sacks: 2
- Stats at Pro Football Reference

Antonio Kenneth Anderson (born June 4, 1973) is an American former professional football player who was a defensive lineman in the National Football League (NFL) for the Dallas Cowboys. He also was a member of the Memphis Maniax in the XFL. He played college football for the Syracuse Orange.

== Early life ==
Anderson attended Midwood High School, where he was a two-way player at defensive tackle and offensive tackle. He transferred to Milford Academy, where he focused on playing defensive tackle.

As a senior, he registered 90 tackles (30 for loss), 13 sacks, and 3 blocked punts, while receiving Super Prep Al-American and All-Northeast honors.

== College career ==
Anderson accepted a football scholarship from Syracuse University. As a redshirt freshman, he played in every game (3 starts) at defensive tackle, registering 13 tackles, one sack and one quarterback pressure. He had 2 tackles and one sack in the season opener against Ball State University. He made 4 tackles (one for loss) against the University of Pittsburgh.

As a sophomore reserve left defensive tackle, he made 17 tackles (2 for loss), one sack and 4 quarterback pressures. He had 5 tackles, one sack and one quarterback pressure against Virginia Tech. He had 4 tackles (one for loss), one quarterback pressures and one fumble recovery against Temple University.

As a junior, he started 6 games at left defensive tackle and 2 contests at right defensive tackle, posting 42 tackles (3 for loss), 8 quarterback pressures (led team), 3.5 sacks, 2 fumble recoveries and one pass defensed. He had 4 tackles and one fumble recovery against Rutgers University. He tallied 6 tackles against West Virginia University. He made 5 tackles and 2 quarterback pressures against Virginia Tech. He had 7 tackles (one for loss) against the University of Pittsburgh. He made 2.5 sacks against Boston College.

As a senior, he started all of the games, recording 45 tackles (9 for loss), 4 sacks, 27 quarterback pressures, 2 passes defensed and 3 forced fumbles. He had 6 tackles, half a sack and 4 quarterback pressures in the season opener against the University of North Carolina. He collected 6 tackles, 4 quarterback pressures, one sack and one forced fumble against Virginia Tech. He had 7 tackles and 2 sacks against Boston College. He tallied 5 tackles (one for loss) and 7 quarterback pressures against Army.

== Professional career ==
Pre-draft measurables
Height	Weight	Arm length	Hand span
6 ft 6 5/8 in (2.00 m)	314 lb (142 kg)	37 3/4 in (0.96 m)	10 in (0.25 m)

=== Dallas Cowboys ===
Anderson was selected by the Dallas Cowboys in the fourth round (101st pick overall) of the 1997 NFL draft, after dropping because his physical skills didn't match his on-field production. As a rookie, he registered 40 tackles (2 for loss), 2 sacks, 3 quarterback pressures and 2 passes defensed. He started five games and received NFL All-rookie team honors.

He had 7 tackles in the third game against the Philadelphia Eagles, starting in place of an injured Chad Hennings. He collected 2 tackles, one quarterback pressure and one pass defensed against the Chicago Bears. He made 4 tackles and one sack against the Jacksonville Jaguars. He had 6 tackles in the eighth game against the Philadelphia Eagles. He totaled 5 tackles against the San Francisco 49ers.

In 1998, he was limited to only five games and 5 tackles (one for loss) due to a right knee injury, eventually falling out of the defensive line rotation. He was left unprotected for the 1999 NFL expansion draft.

=== Cleveland Browns ===
The Browns selected him in the 1999 NFL expansion draft. He was released on April 22.

=== Carolina Panthers ===
On June 24, 1999, he signed with the Carolina Panthers. He was released before the season started on July 21.

=== Memphis Maniax ===
In 2001, Anderson joined the Memphis Maniax of the XFL. He was a backup defensive tackle and registered 4 tackles. The league ceased operations in May 2001.

== Personal life ==
Anderson was a defensive assistant coach at Hempstead High School. He was a defensive line coach with the Rhein Fire in NFL Europe. He was a defensive assistant at the Merchant Marine Academy. He was a defensive line coach at Nassau Community College. He is currently a defensive line coach and recruiting coordinator at ASA College in New York.

He is one of 14 children. He has 3 cousins that played professional sports: Stanford Jennings (NFL), Keith Jennings (NFL) and John Salley (NBA).
