= Omar Stoutmire =

American football player (born 1974)

No. 24, 26, 23
- Position: Safety

Personal information
- Born: July 9, 1974 (age 52); Pensacola, Florida, U.S.
- Listed height: 5 ft 11 in (1.80 m)
- Listed weight: 205 lb (93 kg)

Career information
- High school: Long Beach Polytechnic (Long Beach, California)
- College: Fresno State
- NFL draft: 1997: 7th round, 224th overall pick

Career history
- Dallas Cowboys (1997–1998); Cleveland Browns (1999); New York Jets (1999); New York Giants (2000–2004); Washington Redskins (2005); New Orleans Saints (2006); Washington Redskins (2007)

Awards and highlights
- All-WAC (1996); Second-team All-WAC (1995)

Career NFL statistics
- Total tackles: 421
- Sacks: 5
- Forced fumbles: 6
- Interceptions: 7
- Defensive touchdowns: 1
- Stats at Pro Football Reference

Omar Array Stoutmire (born July 9, 1974) is an American former professional football player who was a safety in the National Football League (NFL) for the Dallas Cowboys, Cleveland Browns, New York Jets, New York Giants, and Washington Redskins. He played college football for the Fresno State Bulldogs. He was selected by the Cowboys in the seventh round of the 1997 NFL draft.

== Early life ==
Stoutmire attended Long Beach Polytechnic High School, where he was a two-way player, as a defensive back and tight end. In his senior season, he received Super Prep All-American, All-Moore League, All-city and Fresno State's Scholar-Athlete of the Year honors.

He accepted a football scholarship from Fresno State University, where he became a starter at strong safety as a freshman. He recorded 93 tackles (2 for loss), 2 interceptions, 2 passes defensed, 2 forced fumbles, 2 fumble recoveries, one sack and one quarterback pressure. He had 20 tackles against Utah State University.

As a sophomore, he had 80 tackles (fourth on the team), 5 sacks (led the team), 8 passes defensed (second on the team) and 3 fumble recoveries. He missed 3 games with an ankle injury. He collected 12 tackles against Ohio State University and Oregon State University.

As a junior he was switched to free safety, setting the Western Athletic Conference and the school record for tackles in a season (198). He averaged 16.5 tackles per-game and had double-digit tackles in 11 out of 12 contests. He also registered 2 interceptions, 2 passes defensed, 3 quarterback pressures, one tackle for loss, one forced fumble and one fumble recovery. He had a career-high 24 tackles against the University of Utah, 23 tackles against UCLA and 20 tackles against Brigham Young University.

As a senior, he was moved back to strong safety and was named to the All-WAC team, after posting 87 tackles (2 for loss), one pass defensed and one quarterback pressure. He had 11 tackles against the University of Auburn, 15 tackles against the University of Wyoming and 12 against the University of Colorado. He ended his college eligibility with school records for career tackles (458) and most tackles in a single-season (198).

In 2013, he was inducted into the Fresno Athletic Hall of Fame.

== Professional career ==
=== Dallas Cowboys ===
Stoutmire was selected in the seventh round (224th overall pick) of the 1997 NFL draft by the Dallas Cowboys. As a rookie, he played strong safety in the nickel defense and displayed excellent run-support skills. When Darren Woodson sustained a knee injury, he started against the Philadelphia Eagles and registered 13 tackles—the first time a rookie started at safety for the Cowboys in a nonstrike game since Michael Downs in the 1981 season. He produced 7 special teams tackles, 2 interceptions (tied for the team lead), 2 sacks, 2 passes defensed, one forced fumble and was sixth on the team and seventh for NFL rookies in tackles with 76.

In 1998, he earned the free safety starting position over George Teague and Kenny Wheaton. In the last 4 games he lost his starting position to Teague. He made 12 starts, 77 tackles (fifth on the team), 5 tackles for loss (tied for second on the team) and 2 forced fumbles. On September 5, 1999, he was waived because of his weaknesses in pass coverage.

=== Cleveland Browns ===
On September 6, 1999, he was claimed off waivers by the expansion Cleveland Browns. He wasn't activated for any games and was released on September 21.

=== New York Jets ===
On October 6, 1999, he signed with the New York Jets. He started at free safety for 5 games. He was cut on August 26, 2000.

=== New York Giants ===
On August 30, 2000, he was signed by the New York Giants and played in Super Bowl XXXV. In 2001, he finished second on the team in special teams tackles (15). He played in the nickel defense and special teams until 2002, when he earned the starting free safety position. In 2003, he was third on the team in tackles with a career-high 109.

In 2004, he was replaced in the starting lineup with Brent Alexander, before tearing his anterior cruciate ligament in the season opener and being placed on the injured reserve list. He was waived on February 22, 2005.

=== Washington Redskins (first stint) ===
On July 29, 2005, he signed with the Washington Redskins. He played in 12 games including both playoff games. He made four tackles and one sack, in a 17–10 playoff win against the Tampa Bay Buccaneers.

=== New Orleans Saints ===
On March 17, 2006, he signed with the New Orleans Saints. He earned the strong safety position (9 starts). He helped the team reach the playoffs, while registering 56 tackles, 5 passes defensed and 2 interceptions.

=== Washington Redskins (second stint) ===
On March 20, 2007, he returned to the Washington Redskins for his final NFL campaign. He played in 3 games after being on and off the roster during the season. He wasn't re-signed after the season.

== NFL career statistics ==
Legend
**Bold**	Career high

=== Regular season ===
Year	Team	Games		Tackles				Interceptions				Fumbles			
Year	Team	GP	GS	Comb	Solo	Ast	Sck	Int	Yds	TD	Lng	FF	FR	Yds	TD
1997	DAL	16	2	46	38	8	**2.0**	**2**	8	0	8	0	**1**	0	0
1998	DAL	16	12	52	36	16	1.0	0	0	0	0	1	**1**	0	0
1999	NYJ	12	5	37	30	7	1.0	**2**	**97**	**1**	**67**	0	**1**	0	0
2000	NYG	16	0	9	9	0	0.0	0	0	0	0	0	0	0	0
2001	NYG	16	0	17	13	4	0.0	0	0	0	0	0	0	0	0
2002	NYG	16	16	88	70	18	0.0	0	0	0	0	**2**	0	0	0
2003	NYG	16	16	**95**	**74**	**21**	1.0	1	34	0	34	**2**	0	0	0
2004	NYG	1	0	3	1	2	0.0	0	0	0	0	0	0	0	0
2005	WAS	11	0	18	15	3	0.0	0	0	0	0	1	0	0	0
2006	NOR	13	9	55	43	12	0.0	**2**	10	0	10	0	0	0	0
2007	WAS	3	0	1	0	1	0.0	0	0	0	0	0	0	0	0
		136	60	421	329	92	5.0	7	149	1	67	6	3	0	0

=== Playoffs ===
Year	Team	Games		Tackles				Interceptions				Fumbles			
Year	Team	GP	GS	Comb	Solo	Ast	Sck	Int	Yds	TD	Lng	FF	FR	Yds	TD
1998	DAL	1	0	1	1	0	0.0	0	0	0	0	0	0	0	0
2000	NYG	3	0	2	1	1	0.0	0	0	0	0	0	0	0	0
2002	NYG	1	1	6	**6**	0	0.0	0	0	0	0	0	0	0	0
2005	WAS	2	0	**8**	5	**3**	**1.0**	0	0	0	0	0	0	0	0
		7	1	17	13	4	1.0	0	0	0	0	0	0	0	0

== Personal life ==
Stoutmire founded the North Texas Jackrabbits, a track and field program for youths. He currently coaches the Prestonwood Christian Academy track team.
