= Daryl Hobbs =

American gridiron football player (born 1968)

No. 80, 18, 82
- Position: Wide receiver

Personal information
- Born: May 23, 1968 (age 58); Victoria, Texas, U.S.
- Listed height: 6 ft 2 in (1.88 m)
- Listed weight: 175 lb (79 kg)

Career information
- High school: University (Los Angeles, California)
- College: Pacific
- NFL draft: 1992: undrafted

Career history
- Los Angeles/Oakland Raiders (1992–1996); New Orleans Saints (1997); Seattle Seahawks (1997); Kansas City Chiefs (1998)*; Montreal Alouettes (1999); Saskatchewan Roughriders (2000); Memphis Maniax (2001)
- * Offseason or practice squad member only

Career NFL statistics
- Receptions: 94
- Receiving yards: 1,172
- Receiving touchdowns: 7
- Stats at Pro Football Reference

Daryl Hobbs (born May 23, 1968, in Victoria, Texas) is an American former professional football player who was a wide receiver for five seasons in the National Football League (NFL). He played college football for the Pacific Tigers. Hobbs played in the NFL for the Los Angeles/Oakland Raiders, New Orleans Saints, and Seattle Seahawks. He played in the Canadian Football League from 1999 to 2000 with the Montreal Alouettes and Saskatchewan Roughriders. Hobbs also played in the XFL for the Memphis Maniax. He was also a member of the Kansas City Chiefs.

In 2012, Daryl Hobbs took over the head coach position with Robert E. Lee High School in Houston, Texas. Previous to that assignment, Hobbs served as the head coach at Legacy Christian High School for two years in Beaumont, Texas. At Legacy Christian, he turned a winless team to have a 13–8 record and in 2011, his best season, Legacy Christian was within one game of going to playoffs.

== See also ==
- List of NCAA major college football yearly receiving leaders
