= Jeremiah Trotter =

American football player (born 1977)

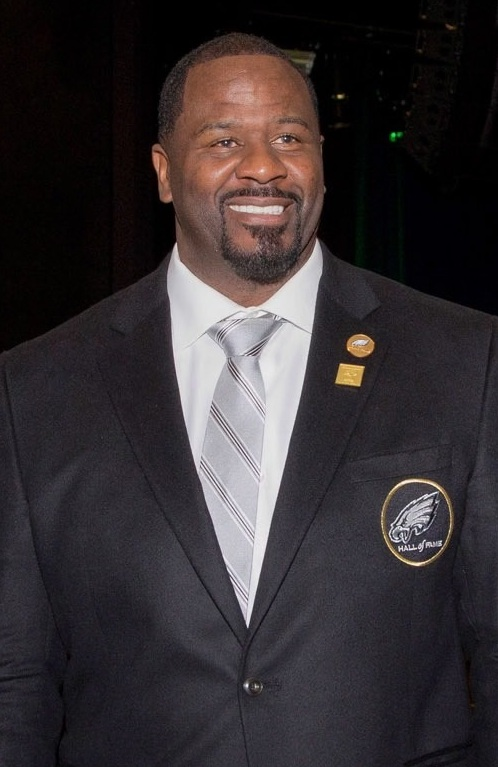
- Trotter in 2023

No. 54, 50
- Position: Linebacker

Personal information
- Born: January 20, 1977 (age 49); Hooks, Texas, U.S.
- Listed height: 6 ft 1 in (1.85 m)
- Listed weight: 262 lb (119 kg)

Career information
- High school: Hooks
- College: Stephen F. Austin (1995–1997)
- NFL draft: 1998: 3rd round, 72nd overall pick

Career history
- Philadelphia Eagles (1998–2001); Washington Redskins (2002–2003); Philadelphia Eagles (2004–2006); Tampa Bay Buccaneers (2007); Philadelphia Eagles (2009)

Awards and highlights
- First-team All-Pro (2000); Second-team All-Pro (2001); 4× Pro Bowl (2000, 2001, 2004, 2005); Philadelphia Eagles Hall of Fame; Consensus All-American (1997); Consensus All-SLC (1997)

Career NFL statistics
- Tackles: 914
- Sacks: 12.5
- Forced fumbles: 9
- Fumble recoveries: 3
- Interceptions: 9
- Defensive touchdowns: 2
- Stats at Pro Football Reference

Jeremiah Trotter (born January 20, 1977) is an American former professional football player who was a linebacker in the National Football League (NFL) for 11 seasons. He played college football for the Stephen F. Austin Lumberjacks and was selected by the Philadelphia Eagles in the third round of the 1998 NFL draft.

Trotter is one of just four linebackers in Eagles history to earn four or more Pro Bowl invitations, joining Chuck Bednarik, Maxie Baughan, and Bill Bergey in that select group. Trotter was also a member of the Washington Redskins and Tampa Bay Buccaneers.

== Early life ==
Trotter attended Hooks High School in Hooks, Texas and was a letterman in football. In football, he was a three-time all district honoree and was named the District MVP as a senior.

== Professional career ==
Pre-draft measurables
Height	Weight	Arm length	Hand span	40-yard dash	10-yard split	20-yard split	20-yard shuttle	Three-cone drill	Vertical jump	Broad jump	Bench press
6 ft 0 1/2 in (1.84 m)	261 lb (118 kg)	34 3/8 in (0.87 m)	10 1/8 in (0.26 m)	4.68 s	1.66 s	2.72 s	4.14 s	7.62 s	34.0 in (0.86 m)	9 ft 9 in (2.97 m)	32 reps

=== Philadelphia Eagles (first stint) ===
Trotter was selected by the Philadelphia Eagles in the third round of the 1998 NFL draft. In his first year with the Eagles as a backup, he recorded only six tackles. In his second season, newly hired Head Coach Andy Reid named Trotter the starting middle linebacker. Over the next three seasons, he led the team in tackles. In four seasons with the Eagles, he had accumulated 361 tackles, nine sacks, five interceptions and four forced fumbles. He also made two straight Pro Bowls in the 2000 and 2001 seasons.

Trotter and the Eagles defense ranked second in the NFL in 2001, earning them their first NFC East championship since 1988. The Eagles would go to the NFC Championship that year for the first time since 1980, but lost to the St. Louis Rams. Following the loss, Trotter became a free agent. He was designated with the franchise tag by the Eagles, but after failing to agree on a contract, became a free agent.

=== Washington Redskins ===
Trotter signed a seven-year, $36 million contract with the Washington Redskins on April 19, 2002. On June 1, 2004, after just two seasons into his contract, Trotter was released. In his two seasons with the Redskins, Trotter recorded over 200 tackles and 1.5 sacks.

=== Philadelphia Eagles (second stint) ===
Trotter tackling LaDainian Tomlinson at the 2006 Pro Bowl.

Trotter returned to the Eagles for the 2004 season, signing a one-year contract worth the veteran minimum.

Trotter became the starter midway through the 2004 season, and immediately improved the defense. That year, the Eagles advanced to their first Super Bowl since 1980, marking Trotter's first appearance in the championship game, though they would lose by a narrow margin to the defending champion New England Patriots, 24–21. At the end of the season, Trotter re-signed with the Eagles to a five-year contract worth $15 million, opting to return despite a larger contract offer from Kansas City.

During the 2005 season opener, about 40 minutes before kickoff between the Eagles and Atlanta Falcons, Trotter and Falcons' cornerback Kevin Mathis got into a fight during pregame warmups. After officials reviewed video to see who instigated the fight, both Trotter and Mathis were ejected before kickoff. Terry Bradshaw said about the incident, "No one's been thrown out of a house that fast since my last divorce". The fight led to an NFL rules change where non-kickers cannot enter a neutral zone between the 45-yard-lines prior to the game.

Trotter was voted to the Pro Bowl in 2005, being the only Eagle to be voted outright by the fans that season (Brian Dawkins was named to the Pro Bowl as an alternate). He was once again named to the Pro Bowl in 2006. On August 21, 2007, the Philadelphia Eagles released the veteran linebacker from the remainder of his second contract. The position of middle linebacker was filled by two-year veteran Omar Gaither.

=== Tampa Bay Buccaneers ===
On September 3, 2007, the Tampa Bay Buccaneers signed Trotter to a one-year deal.

=== Philadelphia Eagles (third stint) ===
After Stewart Bradley tore his ACL during training camp, the Eagles needed an experienced middle linebacker to take his place for the season. Trotter worked out on September 25, 2009, with the Eagles and signed a one-year contract. The following offseason, after allowing Brian Dawkins to leave via free agency, the Eagles cut ties with most of their NFC Championship squad, by trading Donovan McNabb, releasing Brian Westbrook, and not re-signing Trotter.

== NFL statistics ==
=== Regular season ===
Year	Team	GP	Tackles				Fumbles		Interceptions					
Year	Team	GP	Comb	Solo	Ast	Sack	FF	FR	Int	Yds	Avg	Lng	TD	PD
1998	PHI	8	3	3	0	0.0	0	0	0	0	0.0	0	0	0
1999	PHI	16	120	88	32	2.5	2	1	2	30	15.0	30	0	7
2000	PHI	16	120	100	20	3.0	0	0	1	27	27.0	27	1	4
2001	PHI	16	115	93	22	3.5	2	1	2	64	32.0	50	1	10
2002	WSH	12	91	59	32	0.0	0	0	1	2	2.0	2	0	4
2003	WSH	16	113	90	23	1.5	1	1	1	21	21.0	21	0	11
2004	PHI	16	69	60	9	1.0	0	0	0	0	0.0	0	0	1
2005	PHI	15	119	101	18	1.0	2	0	1	2	2.0	2	0	9
2006	PHI	16	113	88	25	0.0	1	0	1	17	17.0	17	0	4
2007	TB	3	13	9	4	0.0	0	0	0	0	0.0	0	0	0
2009	PHI	13	32	29	3	0.0	0	0	0	0	0.0	0	0	0
Career		147	908	720	188	12.5	8	3	9	163	18.1	50	2	50

=== Postseason ===
Year	Team	GP	Tackles				Fumbles		Interceptions					
Year	Team	GP	Comb	Solo	Ast	Sack	FF	FR	Int	Yds	Avg	Lng	TD	PD
2000	PHI	2	17	13	4	1.0	0	0	0	0	0.0	0	0	0
2001	PHI	3	23	21	2	0.0	0	0	0	0	0.0	0	0	1
2004	PHI	3	19	17	2	0.5	0	0	1	35	35.0	35	0	2
2006	PHI	2	13	12	1	0.0	1	0	0	0	0.0	0	0	0
2009	PHI	1	1	1	0	0.0	0	0	0	0	0.0	0	0	0
Career		11	73	64	9	1.5	1	0	1	35	35.0	35	0	4

== Business ventures ==
Trotter has been involved in various business ventures in addition to his football career. In 2000, he opened a salon called T&I Unisex Salon, located in Willingboro, New Jersey. In 2003, Trotter opened a car wash business called Trott's Spot Car Wash, located in Cherry Hill, New Jersey, and he also owns two car washes in neighboring Voorhees. The car wash in Cherry Hill, New Jersey has since closed down.

== Personal life ==
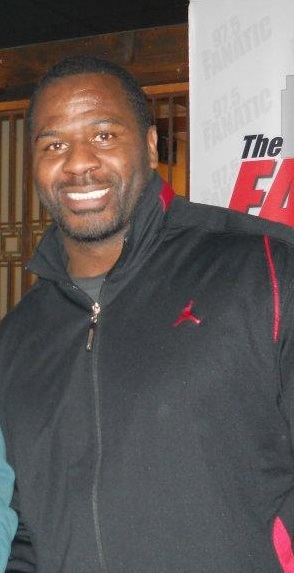
Trotter in 2013

Trotter was married to Tammi Trotter (née Johnson), who died on February 28, 2023. The couple had three children. Trotter is a Christian. While playing with the Eagles, Trotter was a resident of Hainesport, New Jersey.

Trotter's two sons, Jeremiah Jr. and Josiah, each played linebacker in high school at St. Joseph's Preparatory School in Philadelphia. Jeremiah Jr. played college football for the Clemson Tigers, and was drafted by the Eagles in the fifth round of the 2024 NFL draft. Josiah currently plays football for the Tampa Bay Buccaneers.

Trotter was captain of the Philadelphia Benjamins dodgeball team on the 3rd season of GSN's Extreme Dodgeball.

Trotter made his acting debut in 2013 in the independent film The North Star.

Trotter was inducted into the Philadelphia Eagles Hall of Fame on November 28, 2016.

Trotter is the uncle of former St. Louis Rams running back Terrance Ganaway.
