= Rod Manuel =

American football player (born 1974)

No. 97
- Position: Defensive end

Personal information
- Born: October 8, 1974 (age 52); Fort Worth, Texas, U.S.
- Listed height: 6 ft 5 in (1.96 m)
- Listed weight: 290 lb (132 kg)

Career information
- High school: Western Hills (Benbrook, Texas)
- College: Oklahoma (1993–1996)
- NFL draft: 1997: 6th round, 199th overall pick
- Expansion draft: 1999: 1st round, 9th overall pick

Career history
- Pittsburgh Steelers (1997–1998); Cleveland Browns (1999)*; Green Bay Packers (2000)*; Grand Rapids Rampage (2001–2004); Philadelphia Soul (2005)*; Grand Rapids Rampage (2005); Los Angeles Avengers (2006)
- * Offseason or practice squad member only

Awards and highlights
- ArenaBowl champion (2001)

Career NFL statistics
- Games played: 3
- Total tackles: 1
- Stats at Pro Football Reference

Career AFL statistics
- Total tackles: 52.5
- Sacks: 5.5
- Forced fumbles: 3
- Fumble recoveries: 1
- Pass deflections: 12
- Stats at ArenaFan.com

Roderick Demond Manuel (born October 8, 1974) is an American former professional football player who was a defensive end for two seasons with the Pittsburgh Steelers of the National Football League (NFL). He was selected by the Steelers in the sixth round of the 1997 NFL draft after playing college football for the Oklahoma Sooners. Manuel also played in the Arena Football League (AFL).

== Early life and college ==
Roderick Demond Manuel was born on October 8, 1974, in Fort Worth, Texas. He attended Western Hills High School in Benbrook, Texas.

Manuel was a four-year letterman for the Sooners of the University of Oklahoma from 1993 to 1996.

== Professional career ==
Manuel was selected by the Pittsburgh Steelers in the sixth round, with the 199th overall pick, of the 1997 NFL draft. He officially signed with the June 17, 1997. He played in one game for the Steelers during the 1997 season. Manuel appeared in two games in 1998 and posted one solo tackle.

On February 9, 1999, Manuel was selected by the Cleveland Browns with the ninth overall pick of the 1999 NFL expansion draft. He was released by the Browns on August 16, 1999.

Manuel signed with the Green Bay Packers on February 21, 2000, and was released on May 4, 2000.

Manuel signed with the Grand Rapids Rampage of the Arena Football League (AFL) on July 17, 2001, late in the 2001 AFL season. He played in one game for the Rampage in 2001 but did not record any statistics. He was an offensive lineman/defensive lineman during his time in the AFL as the league played under ironman rules. Manuel re-signed with the team on February 18, 2002. On August 19, 2001, the Rampage won ArenaBowl XV against the Nashville Kats by a score of 64–42. He played in 12 games, starting eight, during the 2002 season, recording seven solo tackles, four assisted tackles, 0.5 sacks, two pass breakups, and nine receptions for 113 yards and two touchdowns. He re-signed with Grand Rapids for the second straight year on December 11, 2002. Manuel was placed on refuse to report on January 7, 2003, and the physically unable to perform list on January 10. He was activated on January 28, 2003. He appeared in 15 games, all starts, for the Rampage during the 2003 season, totaling six solo tackles, ten assisted tackles, 0.5 sacks, four pass breakups, seven catches for 68 yards, and one kick return for a ten-yard touchdown. Grand Rapids finished 2003 with an 8–8 record and lost in the first round of the playoffs to the Detroit Fury by a score of 55–54. Manuel was placed on injured reserve on May 4, 2004. He played in 12 games in 2004, accumulating 14 solo tackles, 12 assisted tackles, 2.5 sacks, two forced fumbles, one fumble recovery, and four pass breakups.

Manuel was signed to the practice squad of the AFL's Philadelphia Soul on February 25, 2005.

On March 3, 2005, Manuel was signed to the Rampage's active roster off of the Soul's practice squad. He appeared in seven games for the Rampage in 2005, posting two solo tackles while also catching two passes for 12 yards.

On October 13, 2005, Manuel signed with the Los Angeles Avengers of the AFL for the 2006 season. He was placed on injured reserve on January 23, 2006, and later activated on February 24. Overall, he played in 12 games for the Avengers in 2006, recording seven solo tackles, seven assisted tackles, two sacks, one forced fumble, and two pass breakups. Manuel was released on October 12, 2006.

== Personal life ==
Manuel ran a recording studio for a year after leaving the NFL. After his AFL career, he worked as an AT&T technician for four years and later became a mentor in the Fort Worth Independent School District.
