= Billy Sims =

American football player (born 1955)

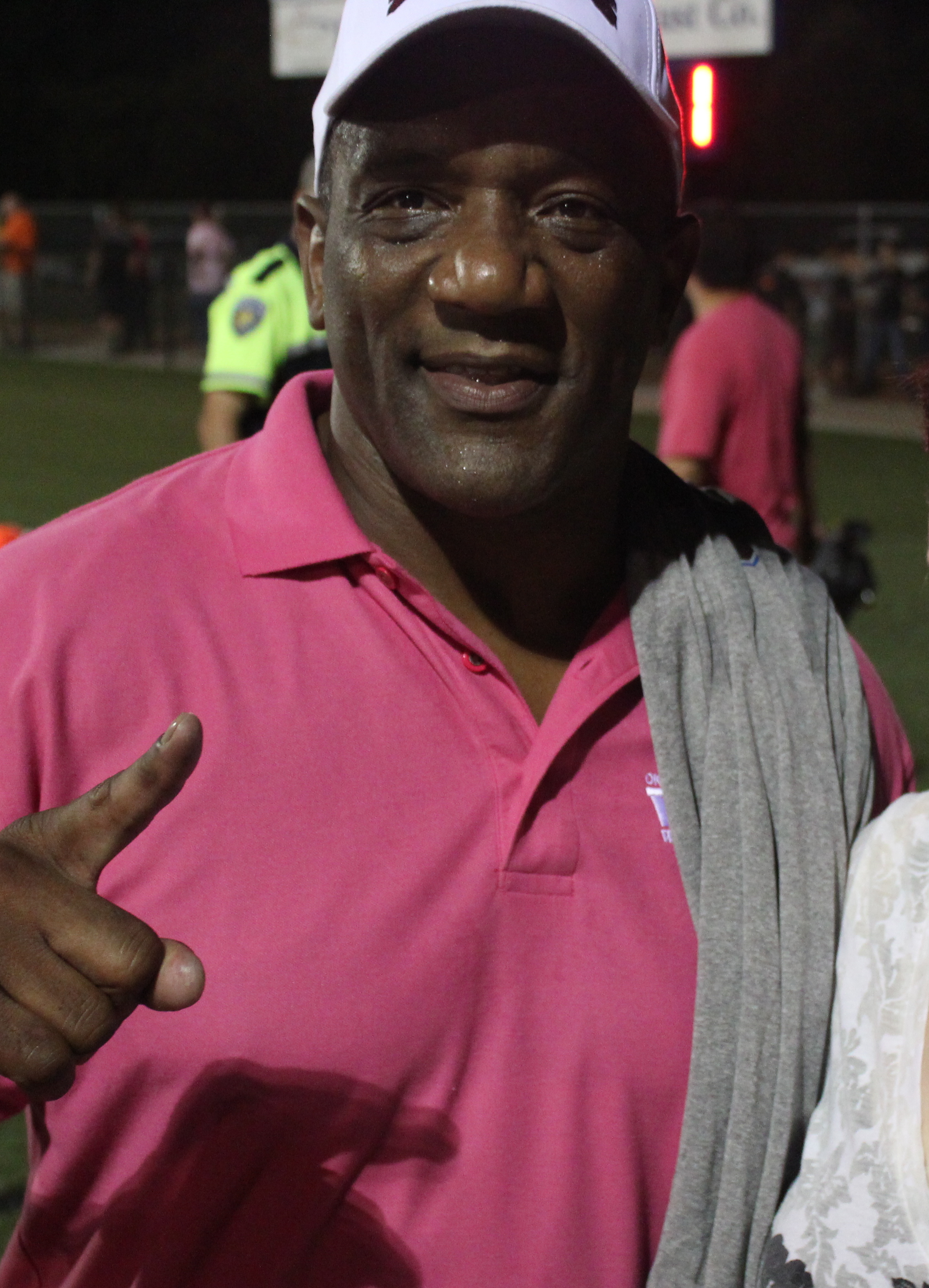
- Sims in 2010

No. 20
- Position: Running back

Personal information
- Born: September 18, 1955 (age 71); St. Louis, Missouri, U.S.
- Listed height: 6 ft 0 in (1.83 m)
- Listed weight: 212 lb (96 kg)

Career information
- High school: Hooks (Hooks, Texas)
- College: Oklahoma (1975–1979)
- NFL draft: 1980: 1st round, 1st overall pick

Career history
- Detroit Lions (1980–1984)

Awards and highlights
- NFL Offensive Rookie of the Year (1980); First-team All-Pro (1981); Second-team All-Pro (1980); 3× Pro Bowl (1980–1982); NFL rushing touchdowns co-leader (1980); Detroit Lions 75th Anniversary Team; Detroit Lions All-Time Team; Detroit Lions No. 20 retired; National champion (1975); Heisman Trophy (1978); 2× Unanimous All-American (1978, 1979)

Career NFL statistics
- Rushing yards: 5,106
- Rushing average: 4.5
- Rushing touchdowns: 42
- Receptions: 186
- Receiving yards: 2,072
- Receiving touchdowns: 5
- Stats at Pro Football Reference
- College Football Hall of Fame

Billy Ray Sims (born September 18, 1955) is an American former professional football player who was a running back for five seasons with the Detroit Lions of the National Football League (NFL) from 1980 to 1984. Sims played college football for the Oklahoma Sooners, earning consensus All-American honors twice, and winning the Heisman Trophy in 1978. He was selected by the Lions with first overall pick of the 1980 NFL draft. After three Pro Bowl selections, his career was prematurely ended by a knee injury suffered in 1984.

Sims was the last Oklahoma player taken number one overall in the NFL draft until quarterback Sam Bradford was taken first in the 2010 draft.

Sims was nicknamed "Kung Fu Billy Sims" by ESPN's Chris Berman, following a game between the Lions and the Houston Oilers. In the NFL Films highlight, rather than be tackled during a rushing attempt, Sims ran at, jumped, and, while fully airborne, kicked Oilers cornerback Steve Brown in the head.

== Early life ==
Sims was born in St. Louis, Missouri, and grew up in the Pruitt-Igoe public housing project. In eighth grade, he moved to Hooks, Texas, to live with his grandmother. Sims initially played baseball and grew up a St. Louis Cardinals fan. He showed no interest in football until moving to Texas.

In three years of varsity football at Hooks High School, he rushed 1,128 times, setting a state record at the time that is currently second behind Robert Strait, for 7,738 yards, including 441 carries in 1973, another state record at the time, currently tied for second behind Ketric Sanford. Sims' 38 games with 100 yards or more rushing from 1972 to 1974 is tied for third in all-time Texas high school records with Ken Hall and Steve Worster and behind Robert Strait's 41 games, and Wes Danaher's 43 100-yard games.

== College career ==
Sims attended the University of Oklahoma, where he played for coach Barry Switzer's Oklahoma Sooners football team from 1975 to 1979. After playing only one game in his freshman year of 1975, injuries kept Sims out of the lineup for most of his sophomore season, which allowed him to red-shirt to gain an extra year of eligibility. Injuries continued to plague Sims for half of his (red-shirt) sophomore season in 1977 (he rushed for only 545 yards total in two seasons in 1975 and 1977, plus one game in 1976.) In 1978, Sims rushed for 1,762 yards on 231 carries as a red-shirt junior, averaging 7.6 yards per carry. Including the postseason, Sims had 1,896 yards. Both the before and after bowl game totals led the NCAA. He also set a total yardage school record that stood until 2004, when freshman Adrian Peterson ran for 1,925 yards. Subsequently, Sims was awarded the Heisman Trophy for the 1978 season, becoming only the sixth junior to do so. He was runner-up for the Heisman the following season in 1979, coming in second to Charles White of USC.

In 1979, against then-unbeaten Nebraska, who had the No. 1 rushing defense in the country at the time, Sims ran for 247 yards and helped the Sooners to a 17–14 win. Including the bowl game he had 248 attempts for 1,670 yards, averaging 6.7 yards per carry, and scored 23 touchdowns. He also became the first running back in Big 8 Conference (now merged to form the Big 12 Conference) history to rush for 200-yards in three consecutive games, and had four 200-yard games in a single season.

After losing to the Arkansas Razorbacks 31–6 in 1978, Sims led the Sooners to two consecutive Orange Bowl titles in three straight appearances. In the Orange Bowl following the 1978 season, he rushed for 134 yards and scored two touchdowns in a 31–24 win over the Nebraska Cornhuskers. In his final game, he ran for 164 yards as Oklahoma beat the previously undefeated Florida State Seminoles by a score of 24–7. Sims ended his career at OU with 3,813 yards; most of those yards came in his final two seasons.

== Professional career ==
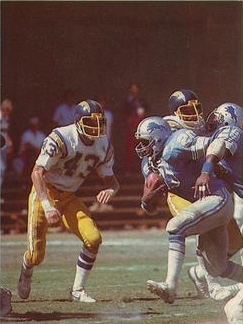
Sims (with ball) against the San Diego Chargers in 1981

As was widely expected, Sims was the first overall pick in the 1980 NFL draft. He spent his career with the Detroit Lions, making the Pro Bowl in 1980, 1981, and 1982. Sims led Detroit to the playoffs in 1982 and 1983, but they lost in their first game in both appearances. In the 1983 NFC divisional playoff game at Candlestick Park against the San Francisco 49ers, Sims ran for 114 yards on 20 carries, but Joe Montana led the 49ers to a comeback victory, as Detroit kicker Eddie Murray missed a potential game-winning field goal in the waning moments.

In 1983, Sims' agent, Jerry Argovitz, took control of a USFL expansion franchise, the Houston Gamblers. On July 1, 1983, while seeking a new pact from the Lions, Sims secretly signed a five-year, $3.5 million contract with the Gamblers; in December, he also signed a new, five-year, $4.5 million contract extension with Detroit. The matter wound up in court, and on February 10, 1984, a federal judge voided the Houston pact, sending Sims back to Detroit.

Sims' career ultimately ended midway through the 1984 season when he suffered a catastrophic right knee injury in a game against the Minnesota Vikings on October 21; in that game, Sims set the all-time Lions rushing record (now held by Barry Sanders) with 5,106 yards on 1,131 carries, or 4.5 yards per carry. Sims also caught 186 passes for 2,072 yards (11.1 yards per catch). He spent two years attempting to rehabilitate his knee before finally retiring on July 24, 1986.

Sims remains a popular sports figure in Detroit. His team uniform number 20 was worn five years after his retirement by Barry Sanders, and is currently retired as an unofficial "triumvirate" of the greatest Lions in the modern era to ever wear the number, which also includes Hall of Fame defensive back Lem Barney. Sims retired with 47 touchdowns in five seasons, which is the most for any player to play in five seasons or less.

=== Comeback attempt ===
In 1988, four years after the knee injury that forced his retirement, Sims announced he was attempting a comeback with the Lions for the 1989 season, which would be Sanders' rookie year. He told Detroit Free Press columnist Mitch Albom, that he was "as fit as he was in 1983." He offered to play the season with a blank check, allowing Lions management to assess his value and fill in the salary amount accordingly. Sims hoped to meet with Lions general manager Russ Thomas and owner William Clay Ford Sr. to discuss a spot on the team's roster. Despite some interest from Lions head coach Wayne Fontes, Sims never returned to the NFL.

== Career statistics ==
=== NFL ===
Year	Team	GP	Rushing					Receiving				
Year	Team	GP	Att	Yds	Avg	Lng	TD	Rec	Yds	Avg	Lng	TD
1980	DET	16	313	1,303	4.2	52	13	51	621	12.2	87	3
1981	DET	14	296	1,437	4.9	51	13	28	451	16.1	81	2
1982	DET	9	172	639	3.7	29	4	34	342	10.1	52	0
1983	DET	13	220	1,040	4.7	41	7	42	419	10.0	54	0
1984	DET	8	130	687	5.3	81	5	31	239	7.7	20	0
Career		60	1,131	5,106	4.5	81	42	186	2,072	11.1	87	5

=== College ===
Legend
	Big 8 record
	Led the Big 8
	NCAA record
	Led the NCAA
**Bold**	Career high

Season	Team	GP	Rushing				Receiving			
Season	Team	GP	Att	Yds	Avg	TD	Rec	Yds	Avg	TD
1975	Oklahoma	1	15	95	6.3	0	—	—	—	—
1976	Oklahoma	11	3	44	**14.7**	0	—	—	—	—
1977	Oklahoma	**12**	71	413	5.8	6	—	—	—	—
1978	Oklahoma	11	**231**	**1,762**	7.6	20	**1**	35	35.0	0
1979	Oklahoma	11	224	1,506	6.7	**22**	**1**	**42**	**42.0**	0
Career		56	544	3,820	7.0	48	2	77	38.5	0

* Includes bowl games.

== Recognition ==
In 2007, a bronze statue of Sims was dedicated on the University of Oklahoma campus in Heisman Park, commemorating his 1978 award. The life and one half size statue was created by sculptor Jim Franklin in his studio in Perry, Oklahoma. The bronze was cast by the Bronze Horse Foundry in Pawhuska, Oklahoma.

Sims has led a "Boomer! Sooner!" chant at the Heisman Trophy presentation whenever a Sooner wins the trophy. He has done so for the four most recent Sooner winners, Jason White, Sam Bradford, Baker Mayfield, and Kyler Murray. He held up a sign reading "Boomer" during the 2009 Heisman ceremony.

In 1995, he was inducted into the College Football Hall of Fame. Sims is honored in Hooks, Texas with Billy Sims Road named in his honor. The local library displays a collection of his photos; Sims said while at Oklahoma that he preferred his home town to big cities. He maintains 30+ Billy Sims Barbecue restaurants franchises with co-founder Jeff Jackson. Before Joe Burrow was announced to win the 2019 Heisman, Sims yelled "Boomer", in hopes Jalen Hurts would win the Heisman Trophy.

=== Career accomplishments ===
- High school (Hooks High School, 1972–74, High School Coach: Jack Coleman)
  - Consecutive 100-yard games: 38 (state record)
  - Total 100-yard games: 38
  - Total points: 516
  - Carries-season: 441 (1973; 378 in 1974)
  - Rushing yards in a seasons: 3,080 (1973; 2,885 in 1974)
  - Career carries: 1,128
  - Total yards: 7,738
- Collegiate
  - Two-time All-American (1978, 1979)
  - 1978 Heisman Trophy Winner
  - 1978 Walter Camp Award
  - 1978 AP & UPI College Player of the Year
  - 1978 UPI Player of the Year
  - 1978 Sporting News Player of the Year
  - 1978 Harley Award Winner
  - 1979 Heisman Runner-Up
  - Orange Bowl Hall of Fame Trophy
  - Big Eight Player of the Year (1978, 1979)
  - Career carries: 538
  - Rushing yards per-carry: 7.1
  - Total yards: 4,118 (4,041 rushing; 3,890 regular season; 3,813 rushing – 77 receiving)
  - Touchdowns: 52 (50 rushing)
  - Total points: 312 (126 in 1978, 132 in 1979)
- NFL
  - 3-Time Pro-Bowl selection
  - 32nd – NFL All-Time Rushing Yards Per-Carry (4.515)
  - 75th, along with Calvin Hill & Don Perkins, – NFL All-Time Rushing Touchdowns (42)
  - 135th – NFL All-Time Rushing Yardage (5,106)
  - 1st player to score 3 touchdowns in first NFL game.

== Post-NFL life ==
=== Financial difficulties ===
When Sims retired from the Detroit Lions in 1984, he received a $1.9 million insurance settlement from Lloyd's of London, in addition to several million dollars he earned during his playing career. Sims lost his accumulated wealth through a series of failed business ventures. His numerous businesses included a nightclub, a radio station, a dry cleaner, and a car parts manufacturer.

==== Selling the Heisman ====
In 1995, he sold his Heisman Trophy to Texas businessman Bob White, who had been a father figure to Sims since he was in the ninth grade; White's son played high school football with Sims. The trophy was sold to White with the agreement that it could be re-purchased by Sims by paying the original price plus 8.5% interest.

== See also ==
- List of NCAA Division I FBS running backs with at least 50 career rushing touchdowns
