= Sweetwater High School (Sweetwater, Tennessee) =

Public school in Monroe County, Tennessee

Location
- 414 S High Street; Sweetwater, Monroe County, Tennessee; United States; 35.5978°N 84.47075°W

Information
- Type: Public
- School district: Sweetwater City Schools
- Principal: Kim Vineyard
- Staff: 34.17 (FTE)
- Enrollment: 610 (2024-2025)
- Student to teacher ratio: 13.5
- Colors: Royal Blue and Gold
- Mascot: Wildcat
- Website: https://shs.sweetwatercityschools.com/

Sweetwater High School is a four-year public high school in Sweetwater, Tennessee operated by Sweetwater City Schools.

== History ==
On August 27, 1898, the school directors of the City of Sweetwater purchased the Bachman Building on College Street for $6,000 for use by Sweetwater City Schools. On September 9, 1912, Sweetwater High School opened at this location under Principal E. Gatewood Hall. Initially, there were three teachers and 35 students. On May 5, 1914, Essie Pennington became the school's first graduate. In September 1916, the school moved to a new site, the former home of Sweetwater Military College, and the future home of Sweetwater Hospital.

In July 1926, the Monroe County Court voted to fund the current site of the school. Fourteen acres of the Cannon Farm on Athens Pike were purchased for a price of $7,500. In September, Young and Stoner were awarded the contract to build the school building. Total cost was $136,000. This brick, two-story building was approximately 28,000 square feet and contained 14 classrooms, a gymnasium, an auditorium/study hall, and an apartment for the principal or caretaker. The distinctive "bowl" in front of the building was created at this time, due to the excavation of needed fill dirt. The building was completed by September 1928. By now, the school have five teachers, 240 students, and Principal R.M. Ivins. The curriculum included business, science, math, history, home economics, English, French, and Latin.

In 1927, the school adopted the "Wild Cats" mascot, previously being known as the "Tornadoes", this being the current mascot of cross-county rivals Madisonville. On March 7, 1930, the Sweetwater PTA approved a $10 expenditure for the installation of the "SWEETWATER HIGH" letters on the side of "The Bowl".

In 1935, the Works Progress Administration began work on a football field adjacent to the school. Previously, home games had been played at the fairgrounds, Kiwanis Field, or the neighboring Tennessee Military Institute. The cost of the field was $4,722.

In 1963, the current cafeteria was built. The previous cafeteria was converted into a library and offices. In 1964, the school became integrated. In 1965, the aptly-named "Round Building" was built, including classrooms and locker rooms around the perimeter, and a 1,500-seat gymnasium in the center. The former gymnasium was converted into a band room and agricultural shop.

During the 1980s, a new football stadium was built, seating 3,500. In the mid-1990s, the main building was renovated. Eight classrooms were added, and an elevator and chairlift were installed. In 2004, an 11-room addition was built, at a cost of $1.9 million.

== Student demographics ==
In 2020, Sweetwater High School had 602 students: 82% Caucasian, 4% African-American, 9% Hispanic, 3% two or more races, and 2% Asian.

== Athletics ==
Sweetwater has a diversified athletics program, including football, basketball, cross country, softball, soccer, golf, baseball, and cheerleading. Sweetwater won state championships in football in 1971 and 1972 (coached by King Berrong), and 1993 (coached by Bill Dupes Sr.) In 1993, Sweetwater won both the TSSAA AA State Championship in football and the TSSAA AA State Championship in basketball. They also went to the state tournament in TSSAA AA baseball. In 2012, the Wildcats football team reached the Tennessee State 6AA finals, coming in second, as did the girls' soccer team. In 2013, the Wildcats competitive cheerleading team came in second in the State finals.

Kippy Brown a Sweetwater High School graduate, also helped his prep team lead the state in scoring in 1972 and 1973. Following his high school career, Brown attended Memphis State University (currently known as University of Memphis), where he was quarterback for the Memphis State University Tigers from 1975 to 1977. Brown's Tigers upset sixth-ranked Auburn University 31–20 in 1975. Brown engineered this victory by completing seven of 11 passes for 103 yards and two touchdowns. Brown was the interim coach for the University of Tennessee Vols, after former head coach, Lane Kiffin, announced that he was leaving the program to take a position at the University of Southern California. Brown had experience at UT under former head coaches Johnny Majors and Phillip Fulmer.

== Notable alumni ==
- Kippy Brown, Seattle Seahawks Wide Receiver Coach
- Gerald Brown, Atlanta Falcons Running Backs Coach
