= Hooks, Texas =

- City
- Logo

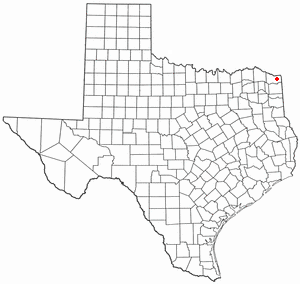
- Location of Hooks, Texas

- Coordinates: 33°28′14″N 94°17′03″W
- Country: United States
- State: Texas
- County: Bowie

Area
  - Total: 2.09 sq mi (5.41 km^{2})
  - Land: 2.08 sq mi (5.40 km^{2})
  - Water: 0.0039 sq mi (0.01 km^{2})
- Elevation: 371 ft (113 m)

Population (2020)
  - Total: 2,518
  - Density: 1,300.4/sq mi (502.08/km^{2})
- Time zone: UTC-6 (Central (CST))
  - Summer (DST): UTC-5 (CDT)
- ZIP code: 75561
- Area codes: 903, 430
- FIPS code: 48-34736
- GNIS feature ID: 2410789
- Website: www.cityofhooks.org

Hooks is a city in Bowie County, Texas, United States. It is part of the Texarkana metropolitan area and had a population of 2,518 at the 2020 U.S. census.

== Geography ==
According to the United States Census Bureau, the city has a total area of 2.1 square miles (5.4 km^{2}), all land.

== Demographics ==
Historical population
| Census | Pop. | Note | %± |
|---|---|---|---|
| 1950 | 2,319 | | — |
| 1960 | 2,048 | | −11.7% |
| 1970 | 2,545 | | 24.3% |
| 1980 | 2,507 | | −1.5% |
| 1990 | 2,684 | | 7.1% |
| 2000 | 2,973 | | 10.8% |
| 2010 | 2,769 | | −6.9% |
| 2020 | 2,518 | | −9.1% |
U.S. Decennial Census; 1850–1900 1910; 1920 1930 1940; 1950 1960 1970; 1980 1990 2000; 2010

=== 2020 census ===
As of the 2020 census, Hooks had a population of 2,518, 1,033 households, and 760 families residing in the city. The median age was 37.7 years. 25.0% of residents were under the age of 18 and 15.6% of residents were 65 years of age or older. For every 100 females there were 92.7 males, and for every 100 females age 18 and over there were 88.1 males.

There were 1,033 households in Hooks, of which 32.2% had children under the age of 18 living in them. Of all households, 39.8% were married-couple households, 20.0% were households with a male householder and no spouse or partner present, and 32.9% were households with a female householder and no spouse or partner present. About 30.6% of all households were made up of individuals and 12.4% had someone living alone who was 65 years of age or older.

0.0% of residents lived in urban areas, while 100.0% lived in rural areas.

There were 1,213 housing units, of which 14.8% were vacant. The homeowner vacancy rate was 2.8% and the rental vacancy rate was 13.6%.

Racial composition as of the 2020 census
| Race | Number | Percent |
|---|---|---|
| White | 1,780 | 70.7% |
| Black or African American | 374 | 14.9% |
| American Indian and Alaska Native | 18 | 0.7% |
| Asian | 15 | 0.6% |
| Native Hawaiian and Other Pacific Islander | 0 | 0.0% |
| Some other race | 112 | 4.4% |
| Two or more races | 219 | 8.7% |
| Hispanic or Latino (of any race) | 238 | 9.5% |

=== 2020 American Community Survey ===
In 2020, the median household income grew to $49,020.

=== 2000 census ===
At the 2000 census, there were 2,973 people, 1,215 households, and 840 families residing in the city. The population density was 1,444.5 inhabitants per square mile (557.7/km^{2}). There were 1,345 housing units at an average density of 653.5 units per square mile (252.3 units/km^{2}). The racial makeup of the city was 84.02% White, 10.12% African American, 0.98% Native American, 0.44% Asian, 0.07% Pacific Islander, 1.45% from other races, and 2.93% from two or more races. Hispanic or Latino of any race were 2.96% of the population.

In 2000, there were 1,215 households, of which 33.9% had children under the age of 18 living with them, 50.3% were married couples living together, 15.3% had a female householder with no husband present, and 30.8% were non-families. 28.1% of all households were made up of individuals, and 14.1% had someone living alone who was 65 years of age or older. The average household size was 2.45 and the average family size was 2.96.

The age distribution was 27.2% under the age of 18, 9.0% from 18 to 24, 27.2% from 25 to 44, 21.8% from 45 to 64, and 14.7% who were 65 years of age or older. The median age was 35 years. For every 100 females, there were 86.6 males. For every 100 females age 18 and over, there were 82.5 males at the 2000 census.

The median household income was $32,083, and the median family income was $37,793. Males had a median income of $30,711 versus $20,982 for females. The per capita income for the city was $15,385. About 12.1% of families and 17.1% of the population were below the poverty line, including 22.3% of those under age 18 and 8.8% of those age 65 or over.

== Education ==
The city of Hooks is served by the Hooks Independent School District.

== Notable people ==
- Wilbert Brown, lineman with the NFL San Diego Chargers, Washington Redskins, New England Patriots
- Shane Halter, MLB player Kansas City Royals, New York Mets, Detroit Tigers, Anaheim Angels
- Durwood Merrill (1938–2003), MLB umpire (1977–1999)
- Billy Sims, running back with the NFL Detroit Lions, 1978 Heisman Trophy winner at the University of Oklahoma
- Jeremiah Trotter, linebacker with NFL teams and four-time Pro Bowler
- Gary Wright, race car driver
