= Memphis Maniax =

American football team in the XFL

Logo

General information
- Founded: 2001
- Folded: 2001; 25 years ago
- Stadium: Liberty Bowl Memorial Stadium
- Headquartered: Memphis, Tennessee
- Colors: Teal, burgundy, gold, black

Personnel
- General manager: Steve Ehrhart
- Head coach: Kippy Brown

League / conference affiliations
- XFL; Western Division

The Memphis Maniax were an American football team based in Memphis, Tennessee. The team was part of the XFL begun by Vince McMahon of World Wrestling Entertainment and by NBC, a major television network in the United States. Home games were played at Liberty Bowl Memorial Stadium.

== History ==
The team's name and logo were designed to lead the team's fans into calling the team "The Ax", a shortened form of the word "maniacs".

The Maniax Director of Player Personnel was Steve Ortmayer, who had become respected in the pro football world for helping to build the Super Bowl XVIII-champion Los Angeles Raiders. Steve Ehrhart, who had managed both the Memphis Showboats and Memphis Mad Dogs, returned as general manager for the Maniax. The head coach was Kippy Brown.

At slightly over 20,000 fans per game, the Maniax were in the lower half of league average attendance; this figure was higher than the Mad Dogs had drawn, and comparable to that of the NFL's Tennessee Oilers during their lone season in Memphis, but lower than the Showboats.

They were in the Western Division with the Los Angeles Xtreme, San Francisco Demons, and Las Vegas Outlaws. They finished tied for second place at 5-5 with the Demons, but did not make the playoffs as the Demons had the better division record during the season. The Maniax were one of two teams to beat the eventual league champion Xtreme, and the only team to beat them twice, going 2-0 vs. their divisional rivals in the regular season; not coincidentally, they, along with the Xtreme and Demons, were the only three XFL teams to maintain the same starting quarterback through the entire season.

NBC officials wanted to move the XFL games to afternoons after the first season (2001) due to dismal ratings, and when, somewhat to McMahon's surprise and disappointment the United Paramount Network (UPN) wanted to follow suit, the league was then folded and the team disbanded.

Ehrhart would later claim that he was originally approached by the XFL to sell the intellectual property rights of the United States Football League to them, but that he owned the rights to the league, received royalties from them, and refused to sell. (Ehrhart's claims are somewhat dubious as he never held any ownership stake in the league, the original XFL had an Attitude Era aesthetic which did not match the brands the USFL had, and the United States Patent and Trademark Office has never recognized any claims from any vestige of the USFL, which dissolved in 1990, regarding the league's intellectual properties and has allowed other organizations to register the trademarks.)

== Season by season ==
Season records
Season	W	L	T	Finish	Playoff results
2001	5	5	0	3rd Western	Did not survive

=== Schedule ===
==== Regular season ====
Week	Date	Opponent	Result	Record	Venue	Attendance
1	February 4	at Birmingham Thunderbolts	W 22–20	1–0	Legion Field	35,321
2	February 11	Las Vegas Outlaws	L 3–25	1–1	Liberty Bowl Memorial Stadium	30,117
3	February 17	San Francisco Demons	L 6–13	1–2	Liberty Bowl Memorial Stadium	17,063
4	February 25	at Los Angeles Xtreme	W 18–12	2–2	Los Angeles Memorial Coliseum	18,341
5	March 4	Orlando Rage	L 19–21	2–3	Liberty Bowl Memorial Stadium	16,176
6	March 10	Chicago Enforcers	W 29–23	3–3	Liberty Bowl Memorial Stadium	17,434
7	March 17	at New York/New Jersey Hitmen	L 15–16	3–4	Giants Stadium	22,269
8	March 24	at San Francisco Demons	L 12–21	3–5	Pacific Bell Park	35,109
9	April 1	Los Angeles Xtreme	W 27–12	4–5	Liberty Bowl Memorial Stadium	21,191
10	April 7	at Las Vegas Outlaws	W 16–3	5–5	Sam Boyd Stadium	15,378

== Personnel ==
=== Roster ===
2001 Memphis Maniax roster
Quarterbacks (QB): 5 Marcus Crandell; 16 Jim Druckenmiller; Running backs (RB): 48 Jim Kitts FB; 33 Brent Moss; 32 Beau Morgan QB; 42 Roosevelt Potts FB; 22 Ketric Sanford; Wide receivers (WR): 86 Keith Crawford; 80 Daryl Hobbs; 88 Charles Jordan; Tight ends (TE): 85 Mark Thomas	Offensive linemen (OL): 79 Harry Boatswain T; 69 Isaac Davis G; 70 Jesse James C; 75 Glenn Rountree G; 71 Earl Scott C; 77 Mike Sheldon T; 74 Bernard Williams T; Defensive linemen (DL): 79 Antonio Anderson DT; 93 Shante Carver DE; 73 D. J. Cooper DE; 53 Tramont Lawless DE; 92 Leonta Rheams DT; 60 Marvin Thomas DE	Linebackers (LB): 59 Richard Hogans; 51 Paris Lenon; 40 Cornell Menafee; 99 Patrick Sapp; 50 Caspor Stiles; Defensive backs (DB): 35 Tyrone Bell; 27 Rico Clark; 25 Kevin Cobb; 3 Jackie Kellogg; 10 Corey Sawyer; 21 John Williams; 29 Marcus Wimberly; Special teams (ST): 4 Jeff Hall K/P	Practice squad: 81 Damien Dodson WR; 96 T. J. Frier DT; 52 Paul Lacoste LB; 62 Tim Seymour C; 46 Shinzo Yamada DB; Reserve: 20 Rafael Cooper RB (IR); 12 Kevin Prentiss WR (IR); 31 Rashaan Salaam RB (IR); Rookies in italics, 5 practice squad

=== Jersey nicknames ===
The XFL allowed its players to wear a nickname on the back of their jersey, as opposed to the legal last name most professional sports leagues have required since the 1960s.

Player	Nickname	Notes
Jim Druckenmiller	Druck	Shortened version of his last name.
John Williams	Christian	Believes strongly in his faith and is an ordained minister.
Kevin Cobb	Kev Cobb	Play on name.
Shinzo Yamada	Samurai	Nickname, that was given by the Japan Sky Sports crew that came to Memphis in mid-February.
Shante Carver	Chaka	Nickname, physical appearance of Shaka.
Daryl Hobbs	The Mantis	Nickname, physical attributes reminded others of a praying mantis.
Antonio Anderson	Big Cat	Nickname.

== Standings ==
Western Division
Team	W	L	T	PCT	PF	PA	STK
Los Angeles Xtreme	7	3	0	.700	235	166	W1
San Francisco Demons	5	5	0	.500	156	161	L1
Memphis Maniax	5	5	0	.500	167	166	W2
Las Vegas Outlaws	4	6	0	.400	169	143	L3

== Team leaders ==
Legend
Led the league

=== Passing ===
Passing statistics (Note: Whelihan was traded to Chicago and the team took his statistics off of the final season statistics. Morgan threw two passes that were credited to Crandell. For the purpose of this chart, Whelihan and Morgan's statistics are included.)
NAME	GP	GS	Record	Cmp	Att	Pct	Yds	TD	Int	Rtg
Jim Druckenmiller	8	7	4–3	109	199	54.8	1,499	13	7	86.2
Marcus Crandell	4	3	1–2	32	67	47.8	463	1	2	63.2
Craig Whelihan	1	0	—	5	12	41.7	46	0	1	18.1
Beau Morgan	—	—	—	1	2	50.0	10	0	0	64.6
Totals	10	10	5–5	147	280	52.5	2,018	14	10	77.6

=== Rushing ===
Rushing statistics
NAME	Att	Yds	Avg	Lng	TD
Rashaan Salaam	114	528	4.6	39t	5
Brent Moss	33	135	4.1	18	0
Jim Druckenmiller	31	208	6.7	36	0
Ketric Sanford	26	93	3.6	30t	2
Rafael Cooper	19	87	4.6	28	0
Beau Morgan	17	37	2.2	16	0
Roosevelt Potts	5	39	7.8	24	0
Marcus Crandell	5	11	2.2	10	0
Charles Jordan	2	19	9.5	12	0
Kevin Prentiss	1	-9	-9.0	-9	0
Totals	253	1,148	4.5	39	7

=== Receiving ===
Receiving statistics
NAME	Rec	Yds	Avg	Lng	TD
Charles Jordan	45	823	18.3	49	4
Daryl Hobbs	30	419	14.0	49t	5
Kevin Prentiss	25	383	15.3	53	0
Mark Thomas	13	133	10.2	23	3
Beau Morgan	10	82	8.2	17	2
Rashaan Salaam	6	41	6.8	8	0
Keith Crawford	4	46	11.5	17	0
Jim Kitts	4	35	8.8	14	0
Rafael Cooper	3	16	5.3	12	0
John Jennings	2	12	6.0	9	0
Roosevelt Potts	2	5	2.5	5	0
Jahine Arnold	1	10	10.0	10	0
Alvin Harper	1	8	8.0	8	0
Brent Moss	1	5	5.0	10	0
Totals	147	2,018	13.7	53	14

=== Scoring ===
8-21 (38.1)% on extra point conversion attempts

Total Scoring
NAME	Rush	Rec	Return	XPM	FGM	PTS
Jeff Hall	0	0	0	0	11	33
Rashaan Salaam	5	0	0	2	0	32
Daryl Hobbs	0	5	0	2	0	32
Charles Jordan	0	4	0	0	0	24
Mark Thomas	0	3	0	0	0	18
Ketric Sanford	2	0	0	3	0	15
Beau Morgan	0	2	0	1	0	13
Totals	7	14	0	8	11	167
