= Jahine Arnold =

American football player (born 1973)

No. 80, 88, 87, 8, 11
- Position: Wide receiver

Personal information
- Born: June 19, 1973 (age 53); Rockville, Connecticut, U.S.
- Listed height: 6 ft 0 in (1.83 m)
- Listed weight: 187 lb (85 kg)

Career information
- High school: Homestead (Cupertino, California)
- College: Fresno State
- NFL draft: 1996: 4th round, 132nd overall pick

Career history
- Pittsburgh Steelers (1996–1998); Green Bay Packers (1999); Memphis Maniax (2001); Tampa Bay Storm (2002); Los Angeles Avengers (2003); Austin Wranglers (2004)

Career NFL statistics
- Receptions: 6
- Receiving yards: 76
- Return yards: 528
- Stats at Pro Football Reference

Career AFL statistics
- Receptions: 22
- Receiving yards: 368
- Touchdowns: 6
- Stats at ArenaFan.com

Jahine Amid Arnold (born June 19, 1973) is an American former professional football player who was a wide receiver in the National Football League (NFL).

== Professional career ==
Arnold was drafted 132nd overall in the fourth round of the 1996 NFL draft by the Pittsburgh Steelers. As a member of the Steelers, Arnold was primarily used for kick returns. In his two seasons with the Steelers, Arnold appeared in twelve games.

After being cut by the Steelers, Arnold played one game with the Green Bay Packers but did not record any yardage.

Arnold was drafted by the XFL's Birmingham Thunderbolts on the second day of the draft and was chosen 194th overall. On March 16, 2001, Arnold was waived by the Thunderbolts and was claimed by the Memphis Maniax. In the XFL's lone season, Arnold played two games, both with the Maniax. He finished with 10 yards receiving 48 yards on returned kickoffs, and 50 yards on returned punts.

Arnold also played several years of arena football before retiring in 2004.
