= Rocky Henry =

Canadian gridiron football player (born 1975)

Lloyd "Rocky" Henry (born April 25, 1975) is a former Canadian football wide receiver in the Canadian Football League who played for the BC Lions, Winnipeg Blue Bombers, and Saskatchewan Roughriders. He played college football for the Utah Utes.
