= Jim Druckenmiller =

American football player (born 1972)

No. 14, 16
- Position: Quarterback

Personal information
- Born: September 19, 1972 (age 54); Allentown, Pennsylvania, U.S.
- Listed height: 6 ft 5 in (1.96 m)
- Listed weight: 234 lb (106 kg)

Career information
- High school: Northampton (Northampton, Pennsylvania)
- College: Virginia Tech (1992–1996)
- NFL draft: 1997: 1st round, 26th overall pick

Career history
- San Francisco 49ers (1997–1998); Miami Dolphins (1999); Memphis Maniax (2001); Los Angeles Avengers (2001); Indianapolis Colts (2003)*
- * Offseason or practice squad member only

Awards and highlights
- Big East Co-Offensive Player of The Year (1996); All-Big East (1996)

Career NFL statistics
- Passing attempts: 52
- Passing completions: 21
- Completion percentage: 40.4%
- TD–INT: 1–4
- Passing yards: 239
- Passer rating: 29.2
- Stats at Pro Football Reference

James David Druckenmiller Jr. (born September 19, 1972) is an American former professional football player who was a quarterback in the National Football League (NFL). He played college football for the Virginia Tech Hokies. Druckenmiller was selected by the San Francisco 49ers in the first round of the 1997 NFL draft with the 26th overall pick. In his career, he played in the NFL for the 49ers, Miami Dolphins, and Indianapolis Colts, as well as the Memphis Maniax of the XFL and the Los Angeles Avengers of the Arena Football League (AFL).

== Early life ==
James David Druckenmiller Jr. was born on September 19, 1972, in Allentown, Pennsylvania. He attended Northampton Area High School in Northampton, Pennsylvania. Druckenmiller then played a post-graduate year at Fork Union Military Academy in Fork Union, Virginia, before committing to Virginia Tech.

== College career ==
Druckenmiller started two years at quarterback for the Virginia Tech Hokies football team. As a senior, he won all-Big East accolades. Druckenmiller's Hokies won the Big East Conference championship in 1995 and 1996. In 1995, they defeated the Texas Longhorns in the Sugar Bowl. Druckenmiller finished his college career with totals of 4,383 passing yards, 34 touchdowns, and 18 interceptions. In December 1996, he graduated from Virginia Tech with a degree in physical education.

== Professional career ==
Pre-draft measurables
Height	Weight	Arm length	Hand span	20-yard shuttle	Vertical jump
6 ft 4 5/8 in (1.95 m)	234 lb (106 kg)	33 1/4 in (0.84 m)	11 1/4 in (0.29 m)	4.28 s	29.0 in (0.74 m)
All values from NFL Combine

=== National Football League ===
Druckenmiller was drafted in the first round (26th overall) of the 1997 NFL draft by the San Francisco 49ers, which intended to groom him as Steve Young's successor; after the draft, 49ers coach Steve Mariucci commented about Druckenmiller: "I would like to think he's our quarterback of the future." Because Young had a concussion, Mariucci decided to start Druckenmiller for the week 2 game (September 7, 1997) against the St. Louis Rams. Although the 49ers won 15–12, Druckenmiller completed only 10 of his 28 attempted passes for 102 yards with one touchdown pass and three interceptions. In the fourth quarter, Druckenmiller was 0-for-5 with one interception and two near-interceptions.

Druckenmiller played in three more games: first in week 3 backing up Steve Young in the 49ers' 33–7 win over the New Orleans Saints. In that game, Druckenmiller completed 4 of 6 pass attempts for 41 yards, was sacked once for 9 yards, and lost one yard on a rush attempt. The following week, the 49ers beat the Atlanta Falcons 34–7. Druckenmiller was 2-for-7 for 32 yards and a 6-yard sack, and -3 yards rushing. Druckenmiller's next game action was in the 49ers' final 1997 regular season game, a 38–9 loss to the Seattle Seahawks in which Druckenmiller was 5-for-11 for 64 yards, one interception, one sack, and one rushing yard. He finished the 1997 season 21-for-52 with one touchdown pass and four interceptions.

In the 1998 season, Druckenmiller played only two games: week 2 against the Washington Redskins and week 6 against the New Orleans Saints. After the season, General Manager Bill Walsh belittled his football skills and implied that Druckenmiller would have been released but for salary cap ramifications.

On September 6, 1999, the 49ers traded Druckenmiller to the Miami Dolphins for a conditional draft choice. Druckenmiller did not play a down in 1999. In a preseason game on August 9, 2000, Druckenmiller completed 13 of 21 pass attempts in the Dolphins' 13–10 loss to the Pittsburgh Steelers for 141 yards including the 78-yard first touchdown drive. The Dolphins cut Druckenmiller on August 16.

In 2008, ESPN named him the 11th-biggest bust since the AFL-NFL merger.

=== Later career ===
In 2001, he had limited action as a backup with the Arena Football League's Los Angeles Avengers.

He also played for the Memphis Maniax of the XFL in 2001. The XFL used the angle of Druckenmiller's history and his unusually strong arm and passing range to promote Maniax games. He ranked 13th in the league in rushing yards (208, leading all quarterbacks) and fourth in passer rating, with 13 touchdowns and seven interceptions.

In 2003, just as Druckenmiller was offered a job as a sales manager for a Little Rock, Arkansas-based cargo trailer company, the Indianapolis Colts offered Druckenmiller a tryout to be Peyton Manning's third-string backup, but the Colts ultimately signed Jim Kubiak.

== Career statistics ==
=== Professional ===
Year	Team	Games			Passing								Rushing			
Year	Team	GP	GS	Record	Cmp	Att	Pct	Yds	Y/A	TD	Int	Rtg	Att	Yds	Avg	TD
1997	SF	4	1	1–0	21	52	40.4	239	4.6	1	4	29.2	10	-6	-0.6	0
1998	SF	1	0	—	0	0	0.0	0	0.0	0	0	0.0	3	-4	-1.3	0
1999	MIA	0	0	—	DNP											
2001	MEM	8	7	4–3	109	199	54.8	1,499	7.5	13	7	54.8	31	208	6.7	0
2001	LA	1	0	—	5	13	38.5	82	6.3	2	1	67.9	0	0	0.0	0
Career		14	8	5–3	135	264	51.1	1,820	6.9	16	12	74.7	44	198	4.5	0

=== College ===
Season	Team	Games (Note: Druckenmiller’s statistics from his bowl game appearances are excluded, as bowl game statistics were not officially counted toward season or career totals prior to 2002.)			Passing								Rushing			
Season	Team	GP	GS	Record	Cmp	Att	Pct	Yds	Y/A	TD	Int	Rtg	Att	Yds	Avg	TD
1992	Virginia Tech	0	0	—	Redshirted (redshirt)											
1993	Virginia Tech	7	0	—	10	18	55.6	134	7.4	2	1	143.6	4	–25	–6.3	0
1994	Virginia Tech	7	0	—	10	20	50.0	75	3.8	1	1	88.0	3	9	3.0	0
1995	Virginia Tech	12	12	10–2	151	294	51.4	2,103	7.2	14	11	119.7	61	57	0.9	0
1996	Virginia Tech	12	12	10–2	142	250	56.8	2,071	8.3	17	5	144.8	74	205	2.8	0
Career		38	24	20–4	313	582	53.8	4,383	7.5	34	18	130.1	142	246	1.7	0

== Legal troubles ==
=== Malicious wounding ===
In 1996, Druckenmiller was charged with malicious wounding in connection with a bar brawl. One witness quoted Druckenmiller as saying to him, "Did you see me kick that guy's butt?" The judge held that the evidence against Druckenmiller was not sufficient to convict him and threw out the charge.

=== Rape allegations ===
On April 24, 1999, police in Blacksburg, Virginia, reported that Druckenmiller had been charged with rape, stemming from an incident in a house between 3 and 4 a.m. on March 4 of that year. According to Assistant Commonwealth Attorney Curtis "Skip" Schwab, Druckenmiller "went downstairs to have sex with a woman who had vomited twice and fallen on a couch," and that Druckenmiller did not know the woman's correct first or last name.

The accuser testified that she vaguely remembered a friend putting her to bed after a night of drinking. She passed out and awoke to find Druckenmiller on top of her. When asked what he was doing by a Montgomery County assistant commonwealth's attorney, the accuser responded, "Having sex. It took me a while to realize what was going on. I was disoriented. I had no idea where I was." According to Druckenmiller, he had carried the woman to a bed after she vomited for the second time that night and slumped on a couch, and stated he went to check on her a few minutes later and asked how she was. When she told him she was drunk but doing fine, he asked her if she was going to make good on a promise she made to him earlier in the evening to have sex.

On July 22, 1999, Druckenmiller was acquitted.

== After-football career ==
Since 2004, Druckenmiller has lived in Memphis and worked in various sales, business management, and information technology positions with companies including ChoicePoint, LexisNexis, and A.S. Barboro.
