= Hooks Independent School District =

School district in Texas

- Hooks, Bowie, Texas

District information
- Grades: PK-12

Other information
- Website: http://www.hooksisd.net/

Hooks Independent School District is a public school district based in Hooks, Texas, United States.

In 2009, the school district was rated "academically acceptable" by the Texas Education Agency.

== Schools ==
- Hooks High School (Grades 9‍–‍12)

During 2022‍–‍2023, Hooks High School had an enrollment of 319 students in grades 9‍–‍12 and a student to teacher ratio of 10.97.

- Hooks Junior High (Grades 5‍–‍8)

During 2022‍–‍2023, Hooks Junior High School had an enrollment of 284 students in grades 5‍–‍8 and a student to teacher ratio of 11.2.

- Hooks Elementary (Grades PK‍–‍4)

During 2022‍–‍2023, Hooks Elementary School had an enrollment of 317 students in grades PK‍–‍4 and a student to teacher ratio of 17.41.

== Notable alumni ==
- Dave Richard Palmer, class of 1952.
- Billy Sims, class of 1975.
