= Robert Strait =

American football player (born 1969)

No. 35
- Position: Running back

Personal information
- Born: November 14, 1969 (age 56); Cuero, Texas, U.S.

Career information
- High school: Cuero (TX)
- College: Baylor
- NFL draft: 1994: 6th round, 171st overall pick

Career history
- Cleveland Browns (1994)*
- * Offseason or practice squad member only

Robert Strait (born November 14, 1969) is an American former football running back.

Strait is considered one of the best high-school football players in Texas history. While playing at Cuero High School from 1985 to 1988, Strait rushed for 8,411 yards on a state-record 1,131 carries, and scored 841 points. He had 41 games with more than 100 yards rushing for his career, which was then second to Emmitt Smith's national record of 45 games and was the Texas state record until Wes Danaher broke the record in 1995 with 43 100-yard games. In 1987, Strait scored 372 points, which is second in Texas football history only to Ken Hall (395 points in 1953), while Cuero High won the 3A state championship. In 1985 and 1986, Cuero had lost the title game.

Considered the state's top recruit in 1989 alongside Jessie Armstead, Strait accepted a scholarship offer by Grant Teaff to play for Baylor University. At the time, he was considered “the most heralded recruit in Baylor school history.” In the 1994 NFL draft he was picked by the Cleveland Browns in the sixth round with the 171st pick overall. He never played in the NFL, though.
