= Crabtree =

Crabtree may refer to:

== People ==
- Crabtree (surname)

== Places ==
- Crabtree, California
- Crabtree, North Carolina, an unincorporated community in Haywood County, United States
- Crabtree, Oregon
- Crabtree, Pennsylvania
- Crabtree, Plymouth, a suburb of Plymouth in the county of Devon, England
- Crabtree, Quebec, Canada
- Crabtree, Tasmania, Australia
- Crabtree, West Sussex, a hamlet in the parish of Lower Beeding and in Horsham District in England
- Crabtree Creek (disambiguation)
- Crabtree Falls, Virginia
- Crabtree Falls (North Carolina), a waterfall in Yancey County, United States
- Crabtree Hot Springs, California, a closed, private hot springs in Lake County, United States
- Crabtree Ledge Light, a sparkplug lighthouse on Frenchman Bay, Maine, United States
- Crabtree, North Carolina
- John A. Crabtree House, a house located in Montgomery in Orange County, New York, United States
- Lake Crabtree, a reservoir in Cary, North Carolina, United States
- Lake Crabtree County Park, a park in Wake County, North Carolina, United States
- Mount Crabtree, a mountain in Marie Byrd Land, West Antarctica
- Thomas Crabtree Three-Decker, a historic house in Worcester, Massachusetts, United States

== Companies ==
- Crabtree & Evelyn, an American retailer of body and home products
- Crabtree Modular Switches, a company now merged in the Indian electrical equipment Havells
- Crabtree Publishing, a children's book publishing company

== Science ==
- Crabtree's catalyst, a complex of iridium with 1,5-cyclooctadiene, tris-cyclohexylphosphine and pyridine
- Crabtree effect, a phenomenon whereby the yeast, Saccharomyces cerevisiae, produces ethanol aerobically in the presence of high external glucose concentrations rather than producing biomass via the tricarboxylic acid cycle

== Plants ==
- The crabapple tree

== Asteroids ==
- 4137 Crabtree, a main-belt asteroid discovered in 1970
