= Spencer, Tennessee =

- Town
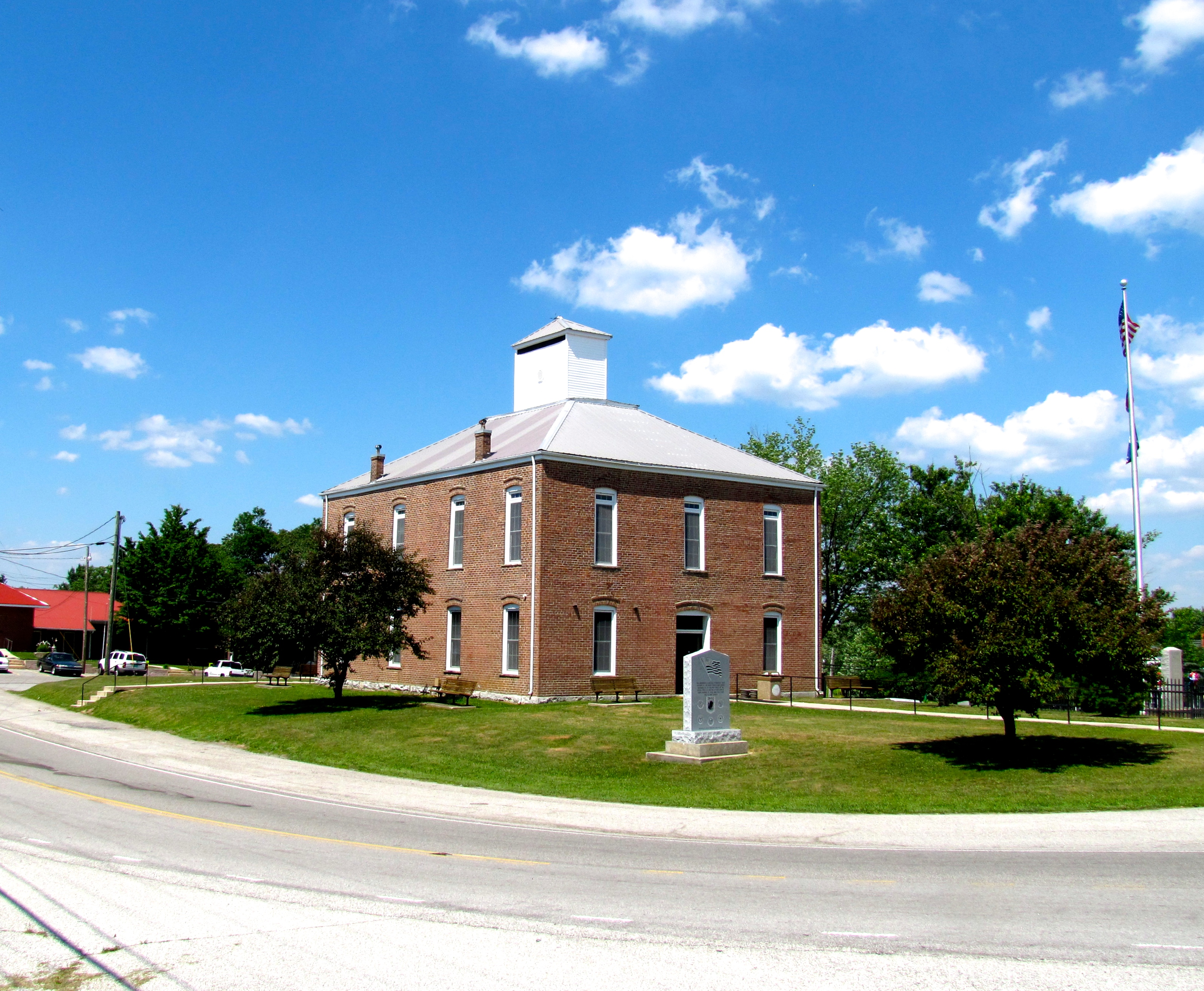
- Van Buren County's former Courthouse in Spencer

- Location of Spencer in Van Buren County, Tennessee.
- Coordinates: 35°44′37″N 85°27′30″W
- Country: United States
- State: Tennessee
- County: Van Buren
- Founded: 1850
- Incorporated: 1909

Area
  - Total: 6.56 sq mi (16.98 km^{2})
  - Land: 6.56 sq mi (16.98 km^{2})
  - Water: 0 sq mi (0.00 km^{2})
- Elevation: 1,798 ft (548 m)

Population (2020)
  - Total: 1,462
  - Density: 223.0/sq mi (86.12/km^{2})
- Time zone: UTC-6 (Central (CST))
  - Summer (DST): UTC-5 (CDT)
- ZIP code: 38585
- Area code: 931
- FIPS code: 47-70240
- GNIS feature ID: 1270985
- Website: https://www.cityofspencertn.com/

Spencer is a town in Van Buren County, Tennessee, United States. As of the 2020 census, Spencer had a population of 1,462. It is the county seat of Van Buren County. It is home to Fall Creek Falls State Park.

== History ==
Spencer is named after Thomas Sharp Spencer (d. 1794), a long hunter who passed through the Van Buren County area in the mid-18th century. The town was established in 1850 and incorporated in 1909.

In 1942, Spencer elected a full slate of women officials.

Burritt College was located in Spencer from 1848 until its closure in 1939.

=== Fall Creek Falls State Park History ===
In 1937, the U.S. government began purchasing the badly eroded land around Fall Creek Falls. The following year, the Works Progress Administration and the Civilian Conservation Corps began the work of restoring the forest and constructing park facilities. The National Park Service transferred ownership of the park to the State of Tennessee in 1944.

Millikan's Overlook is named after Glenn Millikan, who was head of the Department of Physiology at Vanderbilt University School of Medicine and son of Nobel Laureate Robert A. Millikan. Millikan was killed by a falling rock on May 25, 1947, while rock climbing "Buzzard's Roost," the cliff beneath the overlook.

In 2006, the State of Tennessee purchased 12,500 acres (51 km^{2}) of land along the White-Van Buren County line, in the vicinity of Bledsoe State Forest. The purchase was part of an effort to create an unbroken corridor of publicly owned land between Fall Creek Falls State Park and Scott's Gulf, a few miles to the north in White County.

The Fall Creek Falls Inn and Conference Center offered 144 guest rooms and over 5,000 square feet (460 m^{2}) of banquet space in five conference rooms, which accommodated up to 400 people. The buildings were designed with a brutalist architecture, having a combination of dark brick, and gray concrete with an exposed aggregate of smooth white, beige, tan, and brownish river stones. Built in the 1960s, with a rooms-only annex in the 1970s, they were closed in early April 2018 and demolished later that year, after Tennessee Governor Bill Haslam pushed for privatization and potential concessionaires refused to bid on serving the older facilities at the state's resort parks.

Cost overruns and underestimates, and a tight labor market in such a rural area, led to a need for more money from the Tennessee General Assembly in 2019, in turn allowing construction to resume in the autumn. It is expected to finally reopen in late summer or early autumn of 2021, with only 75 to 95 guest rooms, at a cost of slightly over $40 million (up from $29 million originally). It is currently unknown how much nightly room rates will be increased.

Both counties objected to the long-term closure of the inn due to the significant loss of lodging taxes and sales taxes, as well as employees who would be left without a job or forced to relocate or commute long distances to other state parks, even when the closure and reconstruction were expected to be far shorter. Proposals to build on the opposite side of the lake before closing the original inn were declined, largely due to the lack of sufficient sewerage facilities there.

=== Burritt College History ===
The idea for a school in Spencer was first proposed by Nathan Trogdon, a brick mason who had built the second Van Buren County Courthouse in the town. By the late 1840s, a 12-member board of trustees had been formed with Charles Gillentine as president. In 1848, the Tennessee General Assembly passed a law chartering the institution, which was named in honor of activist Elihu Burritt. Funds for the school were raised from among the residents of White, Warren, and Van Buren counties. When classes began on February 26, 1849, the college had an enrollment of 73 students and employed three teachers.

The first president of the college, Isaac Newton Jones, was a graduate of Irving College in nearby McMinnville. He established the college's curriculum, but left after only one year. His successor, William Davis Carnes, played a critical role in shaping the college's policies, most notably introducing coeducation in 1850 and instituting a strict moral and religious code. The policy allowing coeducation met staunch opposition at first, but Carnes defended it, stating, "It is God's law that the young of the opposite sexes should exert a healthful influence in the formation of each other's characters, and no place is better suited to this purpose than the classroom and lecture room." To alleviate fears, Carnes modified the school's code to bar all communication between the sexes outside classrooms or other supervised events.

Carnes' moral code barred swearing, gambling, smoking and drinking. He struggled to curtail drinking, however, in spite of introducing increasingly stringent measures, including the expulsion of anyone caught in possession of alcoholic beverages. He finally turned to local law enforcement, pleading with them to hunt down moonshiners operating in the Spencer area, and destroy their stills. In an apparent act of retaliation, the president's house and the girls' dormitory were burned in 1857. Disgusted, Carnes resigned to become president at East Tennessee University (the modern University of Tennessee). He was succeeded by John Powell, who had been president of the Central Female Institute in McMinnville.

The college closed at the outset of the Civil War in 1861 as many of its male students left to fight in the Confederate army. The college's relative isolation protected it during the first half of the war, though it was eventually occupied by Union troops. With the help of Carnes, who had returned to the area to escape the horrors of the war, the school briefly reopened in 1864. It was forced to close by the Union Army, however, due to concerns over Confederate guerrilla activity in the area. The Union Army occupants used the main hall as a barracks, and dormitories were converted into stables. The campus grounds were trampled and damaged, and the buildings were left in a state of ruin. At the end of the war, the college's trustees sold part of its campus to raise funds for repairs. With Carnes' help, the school managed to reopen shortly after the close of the war. Martin White, a Burritt graduate remembered by students for having walked the entire distance from his home in North Carolina to Spencer to enroll at the school, was hired as president. Carnes was rehired as president in 1872.

During the 1870s, Thomas Wesley Brents, a physician who had recently relocated to Spencer, offered his assistance to Burritt, and began raising money for the college. With his help, the campus more than doubled in size, and a new administration building was constructed. However, Brents demanded he be made president. This angered Carnes, who resigned in 1878, allowing Brents to take over. During his four-year tenure, Brents increased the college's enrollment and overhauled its curriculum. By the time he had resigned in 1882, however, enrollment had started to decline. In subsequent years, the school struggled financially, and was finally forced to close in 1889. The Board of Trustees considered selling the college's campus, but ultimately decided to reopen the school.

In hopes of reviving the college, the Board hired a Burritt graduate, William Newton Billingsley, as president. Billingsley stabilized the college's finances, and managed to increase enrollment to over two hundred students by the end of the decade. In 1897, the college reported an annual income of $25,000, 164 students, 10 teachers, and three thousand books. The early 1900s were among the most prosperous in the school's history, as enrollment never dipped below 200 during this period.

On March 5, 1906, the college's main building was destroyed by fire. At a meeting the following day, the college's administrators and students agreed to finish the year and make plans to rebuild. Classes were held at the campus church and in private residences until the end of the term. The college was closed for several months while a new building was constructed. In spite of fundraising struggles, the new building was completed in 1907.

Burritt again suffered with enrollment issues following the departure of Billingsley in 1911, due in part to the opening of two state normal schools in the region: Middle Tennessee State in Murfreesboro and Tennessee Polytechnic Institute (modern Tennessee Tech) in Cookeville. The Board struggled to find a permanent president until the hiring of Henry Eugene Scott in 1918. During the 1920s, Scott overhauled the curriculum to bring it more in line with that of a typical preparatory school and junior college, offering courses in agriculture, typing, bookkeeping, and teacher training, as well as high school courses. By the 1930s, Burritt had become dependent on the Van Buren County school board for much of its funding. When the school board decided to build a county high school in 1936, Burritt was no longer able to compete for students. It finally closed in 1939.

== Geography ==
Spencer is located at 35°44′37″N 85°27′30″W (35.743740, -85.458408). The town is situated at the western edge of the Cumberland Plateau, just above the Caney Fork valley. The river forms Van Buren's boundary with White County several miles north of Spencer.

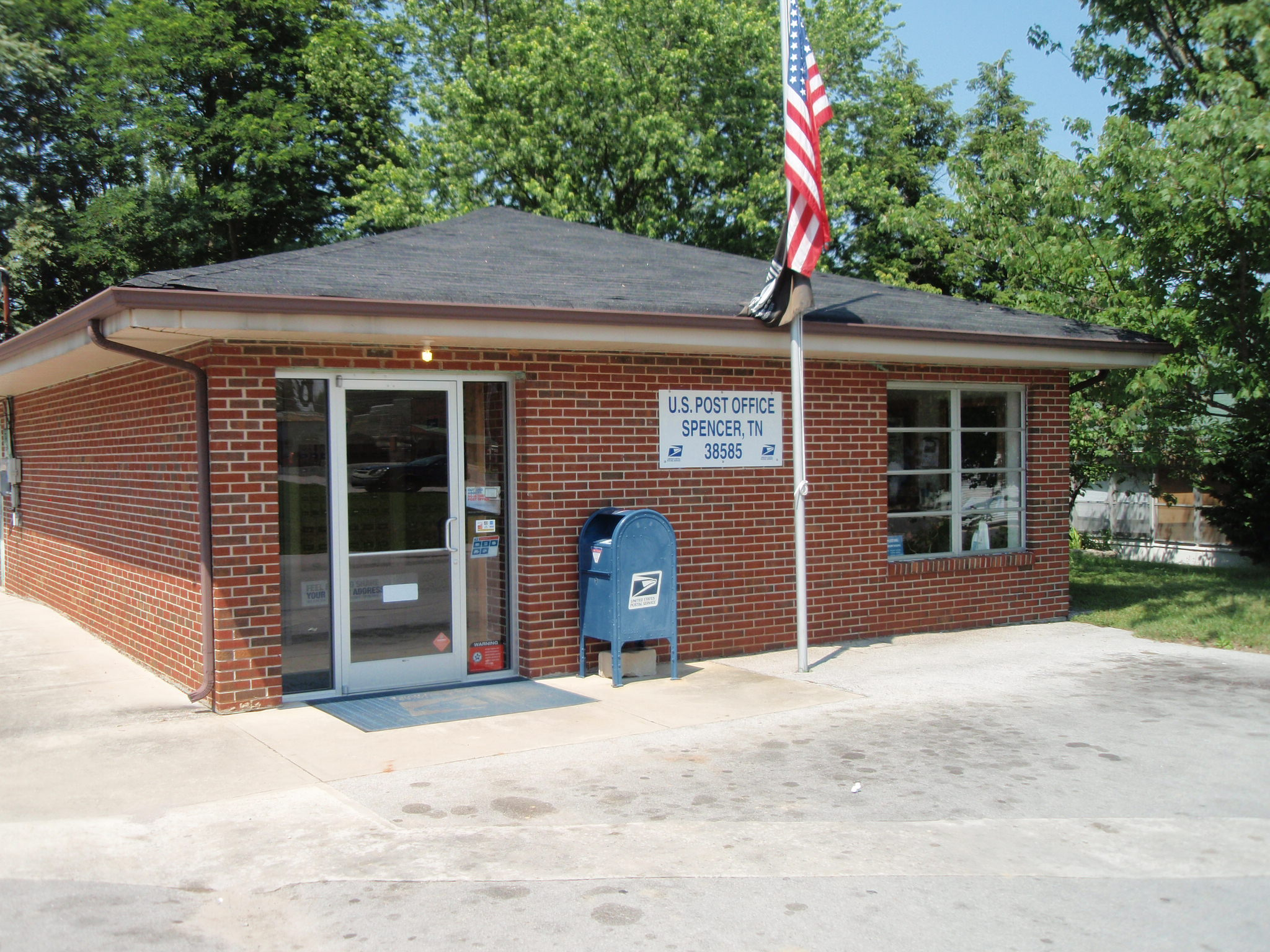
US Post Office - Spencer, Tennessee

Spencer is topographically isolated by the Cumberland Plateau's escarpment to the north and west, the Cane Creek Valley to the east, and the Dry Fork Gulf to the south. Cane Creek, along with its tributary, Dry Fork, slices a narrow valley as it spills down northward toward its confluence with the Caney Fork, effectively dividing the Spencer area from the rest of the plateau. Cane Creek's upper watershed, known for its scenic waterfalls and geological formations, comprises the bulk of Fall Creek Falls State Park.

Spencer is concentrated along State Route 30, which connects Spencer with Pikeville in the Sequatchie Valley to the east, and McMinnville to the west. State Route 111, which traverses the eastern part of Spencer, connects the town with Sparta and Cookeville to the north, and Dunlap in the Sequatchie Valley to the south. Spencer is approximately 30 miles south of Cookeville and 25 miles west of Pikeville.

According to the United States Census Bureau, the town has a total area of 6.8 square miles (18 km^{2}), all land.

== Demographics ==
Historical population
Census	Pop.	Note	%±
1870	147		—
1880	217		47.6%
1890	138		−36.4%
1910	210		—
1930	390		—
1940	508		30.3%
1950	721		41.9%
1960	870		20.7%
1970	1,179		35.5%
1980	1,126		−4.5%
1990	1,125		−0.1%
2000	1,713		52.3%
2010	1,601		−6.5%
2020	1,462		−8.7%

=== 2020 census ===
Spencer racial composition
Race	Number	Percentage
White (non-Hispanic)	1,396	95.49%
Black or African American (non-Hispanic)	6	0.41%
Native American	4	0.27%
Asian	2	0.14%
Other/Mixed	31	2.12%
Hispanic or Latino	23	1.57%

As of the 2020 United States census, there were 1,462 people, 561 households, and 363 families residing in the town.

=== 2010 census ===
As of the census of 2010, there were 1,601 people residing in 632 households, with an average household size of 2.35. The racial makeup of the town was 97.2% White, 1.0% African American, 0.2% Native American, 0.2% Asian, and 1.4% from two or more races. Hispanic or Latino of any race were 0.6% of the population.

Within the 632 households, 29.0% had children under the age of 18 living with them, 47.8% were married couples living together, 14.1% had a female householder with no husband present, and 33.7% were non-families. 30.1% of all households were made up of individuals, and 32.1% had someone who was 65 years of age or older.

The town's population age spread was: 23.0% up to the age of 19, 10.4% from 20 to 29, 12.1% from 30 to 39, 11.7% from 40 to 49, 16.5% from 50 to 59, 14.7% from 60 to 99, and 11.6% who were 70 years of age or older. The median age was 43.4 years. Women comprise 51.2% of the population.

The median income for a household in the town was estimated at $19,033, while the per capita income was $13,555. 34.3% of the population was estimated to be below the poverty line. No data was available as to health insurance coverage.

== Tourism ==
- Fall Creek Falls State Resort Park- is a state park in Van Buren and Bledsoe counties, in the U.S. state of Tennessee. The over 26,000-acre (110 km^{2}) park is centered on the upper Cane Creek Gorge, an area known for its unique geological formations and scenic waterfalls. The park's namesake is the 256-foot (78 m) Fall Creek Falls, the highest free-fall waterfall east of the Mississippi River.
- Fall Creek Falls, a 256-foot (78 m) plunge waterfall located just west of the creek's confluence with Cane Creek. A short trail leads from the parking lot atop the plateau down to the base of the gorge, giving access to the waterfall's plunge pool.
- Cane Creek Falls, an 85-foot (26 m) plunge waterfall located along Cane Creek, above the creek's confluence with Rockhouse Creek and Fall Creek. The waterfall is visible from the Gorge Trail and from the base of the Cane Creek Gorge, which can be accessed via the Cable Trail.
- Cane Creek Cascades, a 45-foot (14 m) cascade located along Cane Creek, just above Cane Creek Falls.
- Rockhouse Falls, a 125-foot (38 m) plunge waterfall that marks Rockhouse Creek's confluence with Cane Creek. The waterfall, which shares a plunge pool with Cane Creek Falls, is visible from the Gorge Trail and from the base of the Cane Creek Gorge.
- Piney Creek Falls, a 95-foot (29 m) waterfall located along Piney Creek, a mile or so above its confluence with Cane Creek. Trails lead to the base of the falls and an overlook above the falls.
- Coon Creek Falls, a 250-foot (76 m) plunge waterfall that drops into the Fall Creek Gorge, nearly adjacent Fall Creek Falls. Its proximity to Fall Creek Falls renders it less conspicuous.
- Lost Creek Falls, a 60-foot (18 m) plunge waterfall where water emerges from a cave above the falls and disappears from the pool at the base.
- Cane Creek Overlook, located just off the Gorge Trail, looks out over Cane Creek Falls and Rockhouse Falls.
- Cane Creek Gorge Overlook, located just off the Gorge Trail, looks northward across the Cane Creek Gorge.
- Rocky Point Overlook, located just off the Gorge Trail on an exposed cliff, looks northward across the Cane Creek Gorge.
- Millikan's Overlook, located just off the road in the Piney Creek section of the park, looks northward across the Cane Creek Gorge, near the confluence of Piney Creek and Cane Creek.
- Buzzard's Roost, a cliff located near Millikan's Overlook.
- Rumbling Falls Cave, which has the second largest cave chamber in the United States, is located in the park's Dry Fork section, near Spencer.
- Camps Gulf Cave is another large cave located in the park that contains very large chambers.
- Lost Creek Cave has five entrances, contains a waterfall and 7 miles (11.3 km) of passageways.

== Education ==
Van Buren County Schools operates public schools.

== In The Arts ==
Artist Gilbert Gaul, who gained national acclaim for his Civil War illustrations, operated from a studio south of Spencer on land currently owned by the park. The Gaul's Gallery restaurant at the inn was named for him.

Fall Creek Falls State Park was used as one of the primary filming locations for 20th Century Fox's fantasy adventure film Turbo: A Power Rangers Movie, Disney's live action film adaptation of The Jungle Book and the comic science fiction film Dr. Otto and the Riddle of the Gloom Beam, starring Jim Varney. Scenes from the 1986 movie King Kong Lives, starring Linda Hamilton, were filmed in the area of Cane Creek Cascades and Cane Creek Falls.

== Notable people ==
- H. Leo Boles, preacher and academic administrator
- Foster V. Brown, U.S. congressman
- Charles Dickens Clark, U.S. district court judge
- Andrew Jackson Clements, U.S. congressman
- Joe H. Eagle, U.S. congressman
- Thomas A. Kercheval, state legislator and Nashville mayor
- John W. Preston, California state supreme court justice
- Thomas M. Shackleford, Florida state supreme court justice
