= Crabtree (surname) =

Crabtree is a surname. Notable people with the surname include:

- Arthur Crabtree (1900–1975), a British cinematographer
- Bill Crabtree (1915–2001), an Australian politician
- Brian Crabtree (born 1938), a British wrestling announcer
- Carl Crabtree (1952–2025), an American rancher and politician in Idaho
- Clem Crabtree (1918–1981), an American football player and military officer
- Clyde Crabtree (1905–1994), an American college and professional football player
- David Crabtree (born 1975), also known as Deadly the Roadie, musician (The Rock of Travolta, The Moneyshots), radio presenter & roadie for John Otway
- David Crabtree, an American journalist and newscaster
- Don Crabtree (1912–1980), an American flintknapper and pioneering experimental archaeologist
- Eorl Crabtree (born 1982), a British rugby league player
- Eric Crabtree (born 1944), a former NFL player
- Estel Crabtree (1903–1967), a Major League Baseball player in the 1930s and 1940s
- George Crabtree (1944–2023), an American physicist
- Gerald Crabtree (born 1946), an American biochemist
- Grant Crabtree (1913–2008), an award-winning cinematographer, director and photographer
- Helen Crabtree (1915–2002), an important woman in the history of Saddle Seat Riding
- Herbert Grace Crabtree, an English biochemist
- Jack Crabtree (American football) (1935–2026), a former American football player
- Jack Crabtree (artist), an English contemporary artist
- Jane Crabtree (born 1981), an Australia badminton player
- Jimmy Crabtree (1871–1908), an English football player
- Jimmy Crabtree (footballer, born 1895) (1895–1965), English footballer
- Joe Crabtree (born 1979), British drummer
- Julian Crabtree, a long-distance swimmer and adventurer
- Lotta Crabtree (1847–1924), an American actor and comedian
- Max Crabtree (1933–2023), a British wrestler promoter
- Michael Crabtree (born 1987), an American former NFL wide receiver for the San Francisco 49ers, Oakland Raiders, Baltimore Ravens, and Arizona Cardinals
- Mike Crabtree, a British racing driver
- Robert H. Crabtree (born 1948), a British chemist
- Shirley Crabtree aka Big Daddy (1930–1997), an English professional wrestler
- Susan Crabtree, senior editor of The Hill
- Tim Crabtree (born 1969), a Major League Baseball pitcher for the Toronto Blue Jays and Texas Rangers
- Tom Crabtree (born 1985), American football tight end
- William Crabtree (1610–1644), an astronomer, mathematician
- William Crabtree (architect) (1905–1991), an English architect

== Fictional characters ==
- Constance, Lady Crabtree, a comedy character created by the author and broadcaster Paul James in 1978
- Kelly Crabtree, a character from the UK television ITV soap opera Coronation Street
- Miss Crabtree, a schoolteacher in Our Gang a.k.a. "The Little Rascals" short subjects
- Officer Crabtree, a character from 'Allo 'Allo!
- Veronica Crabtree, a character from South Park
- Constable George Crabtree, a character in Murdoch Mysteries
- Chester and Clara Crabtree, Moose and Molly's cranky neighbors in the comic strip Moose & Molly

== See also ==
- Crabtree (disambiguation)
