= Fall Creek Falls State Park =

State park in Tennessee, United States

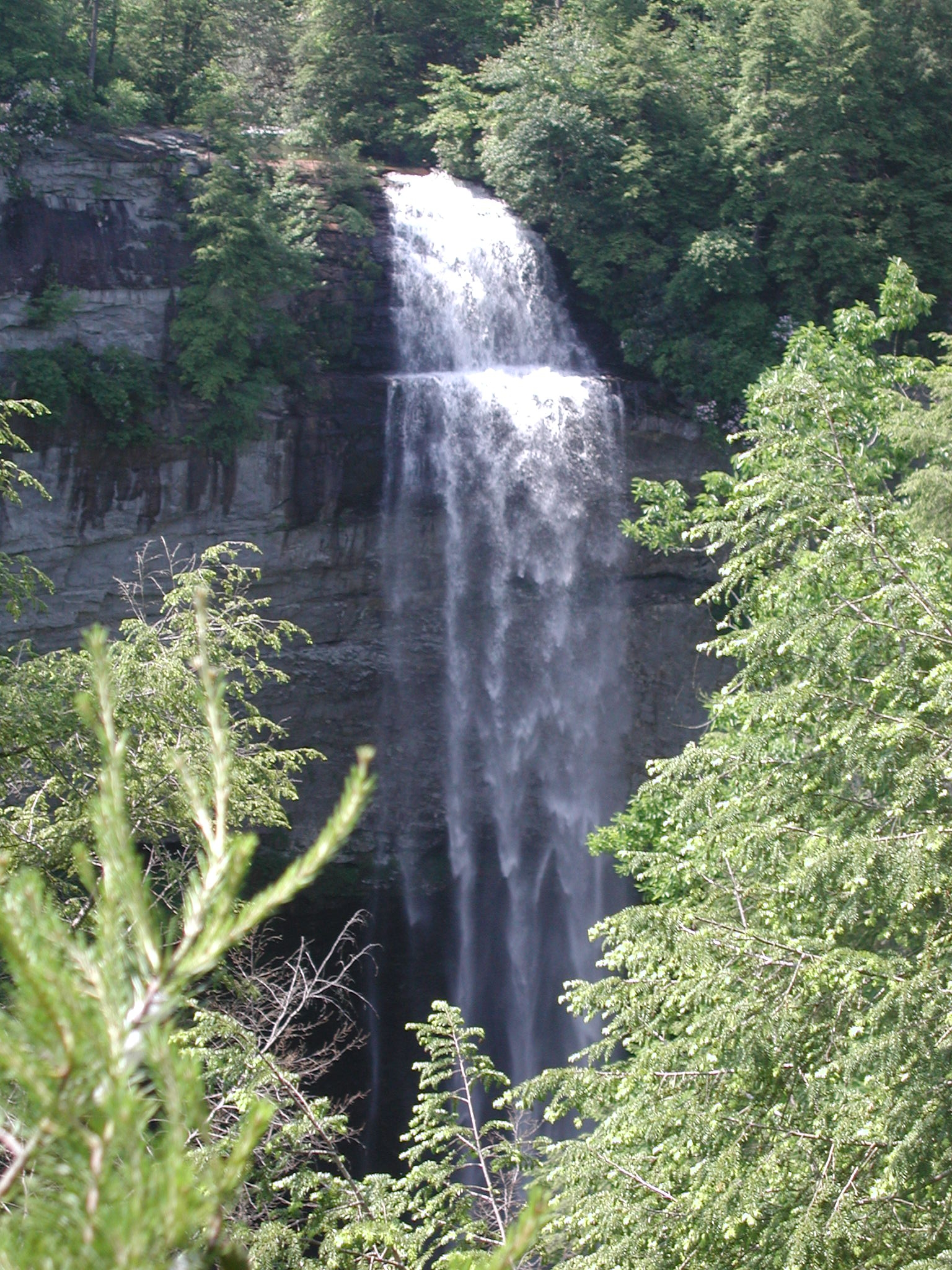
- Interactive map of Fall Creek Falls State Park
- Type: Tennessee State Park
- Location: Bledsoe and Van Buren counties
- Coordinates: 35.66211°N 85.34978°W
- Area: 30,638 acres (123.99 km^{2})
- Created: 1935
- Operator: Tennessee Department of Environment and Conservation
- Open: Year round
- Website: Fall Creek Falls State Park

Fall Creek Falls State Resort Park is a state park in Van Buren and Bledsoe counties, in the U.S. state of Tennessee. The over 30,638-acre (123.99 km^{2}) park is centered on the upper Cane Creek Gorge, an area known for its unique geological formations and scenic waterfalls. The park's namesake is the 256-foot (78 m) Fall Creek Falls, the highest free-fall waterfall east of the Mississippi River.

== Geography ==
=== Setting ===
The Cane Creek Gorge presents as a large gash in the western edge of the Cumberland Plateau, stretching for some 15 miles (24 km) from the Cane Creek Cascades to Cane Creek's mouth along the Caney Fork River. Cane Creek rises atop Little Mountain — which lines the plateau's eastern edge above Sequatchie Valley — and winds northward across the plateau.

Just beyond its source, Cane Creek slowly gains strength as it absorbs Meadow Creek and several smaller streams. As the creek enters the gorge, it drops several hundred feet in less than a mile, including 45 feet (14 m) over Cane Creek Cascades and 85 feet (26 m) over Cane Creek Falls. A few hundred meters north of Cane Creek Falls, Rockhouse Creek spills 125 feet (38 m) over a plunge waterfall. Over the next half-mile, Cane Creek absorbs Fall Creek and Piney Creek, both of which enter from smaller gorges to the immediate west. During this stretch, part of the creek disappears underground into limestone sinks and reemerges at a spring known as "Crusher Hole." Cane Creek continues to lose elevation before steadying near its confluence with Dry Fork. Beyond Dry Fork, the creek gradually descends to the Highland Rim, where it empties into the Caney Fork River.

The man-made Fall Creek Falls Lake, controlled by a earthen dam, assures continuing flow of water to Fall Creek Falls. The lake dominates the park's southern section.

=== Features ===
==== Waterfalls ====
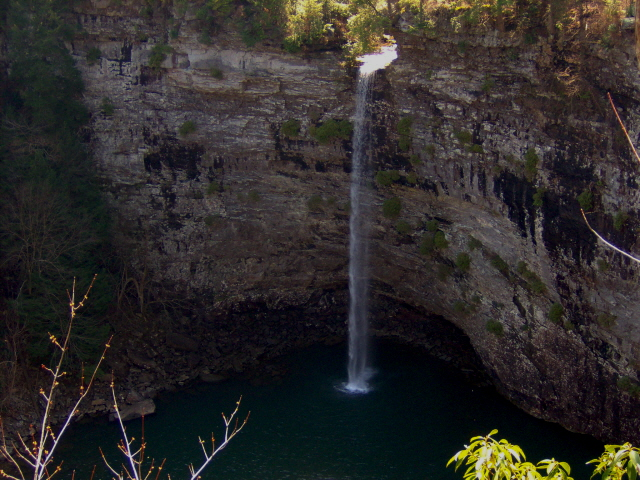
Rockhouse Falls

- Fall Creek Falls, a 256-foot (78 m) plunge waterfall located just west of the creek's confluence with Cane Creek. A short trail leads from the parking lot atop the plateau down to the base of the gorge, giving access to the waterfall's plunge pool.
- Cane Creek Falls, an 85-foot (26 m) plunge waterfall located along Cane Creek, above the creek's confluence with Rockhouse Creek and Fall Creek. The waterfall is visible from the Gorge Trail and from the base of the Cane Creek Gorge, which can be accessed via the Cable Trail.
- Cane Creek Cascades, a 45-foot (14 m) cascade located along Cane Creek, just above Cane Creek Falls.
- Rockhouse Falls, a 125-foot (38 m) plunge waterfall that marks Rockhouse Creek's confluence with Cane Creek. The waterfall, which shares a plunge pool with Cane Creek Falls, is visible from the Gorge Trail and from the base of the Cane Creek Gorge.
- Piney Creek Falls, a 95-foot (29 m) waterfall located along Piney Creek, a mile or so above its confluence with Cane Creek. Trails lead to the base of the falls and an overlook above the falls.
- Coon Creek Falls, a 250-foot (76 m) plunge waterfall that drops into the Fall Creek Gorge, nearly adjacent Fall Creek Falls. Its proximity to Fall Creek Falls renders it less conspicuous.
- Lost Creek Falls, a 60-foot (18 m) plunge waterfall where water emerges from a cave above the falls and disappears from the pool at the base.

==== Overlooks ====
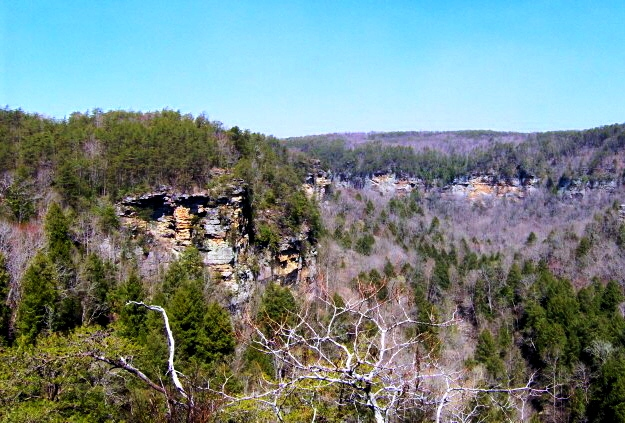
View of Cane Creek Gorge from the Rocky Point Overlook

- Cane Creek Overlook, located just off the Gorge Trail, looks out over Cane Creek Falls and Rockhouse Falls.
- Cane Creek Gorge Overlook, located just off the Gorge Trail, looks northward across the Cane Creek Gorge.
- Rocky Point Overlook, located just off the Gorge Trail on an exposed cliff, looks northward across the Cane Creek Gorge.
- Millikan's Overlook, located just off the road in the Piney Creek section of the park, looks northward across the Cane Creek Gorge, near the confluence of Piney Creek and Cane Creek.
- Buzzard's Roost, a cliff located near Millikan's Overlook.
- An overlook adjacent to the Fall Creek Falls parking lot looks down into the Fall Creek Gorge.

==== Caves ====
Along with waterfalls and overlooks, Fall Creek Falls State Park has the second-most caves of any park in the eastern U.S., behind Mammoth Cave National Park.

- Rumbling Falls Cave, which has the second largest cave chamber in the United States, is located in the park's Dry Fork section, near Spencer.
- Camps Gulf Cave is another large cave located in the park that contains very large chambers.
- Lost Creek Cave has five entrances, contains a waterfall and 7 miles (11.3 km) of passageways.
- Cave Hollow is another cave in the park.

== History ==
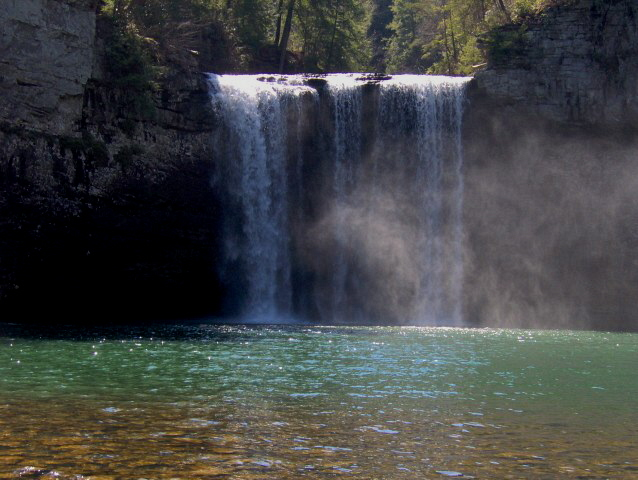
Cane Creek Falls

The plateau areas above the Cane Creek Gorge are characterized by poor soil and weak resource potential, both exacerbated by the area's limited accessibility (by the 1920s, no major railroads and one crude highway passed between Pikeville and Spencer). In the early 20th century, this section of Van Buren County still had only a handful of farms and no major coal mining or logging operations. Local historian Arthur Weir Crouch, referring to Fall Creek Falls, wrote, "In the beginning and for many years it was a true wilderness area."

The few residents who lived in the Cane Creek area were often at the mercy of the creek, which, like most of the Upper Caney Fork watershed, was prone to flash flooding. The Good Friday Flood of 1929, the most devastating of these floods, caused the Caney Fork and its tributaries to swell to record volumes and wiped out dozens of mills, houses, and bridges. Lawson Fisher, who operated a grist mill at the head of Cane Creek Falls at the time of the flood, recalled being awakened that night by the roar of the creek's rising waters. Racing into the mill to save the mill's account books, Fisher later testified:

I had taken perhaps four or five steps when I felt that old mill building quiver. I turned and ran for the door and stepped out on solid ground, and then turned around to see what was going to happen, but folks, it had already happened. The mill wasn't there. I could just see pieces of planking and timbers going over the falls and rushing on down into the valley of Cane Creek below.

Another resident recalled waking up to a cabin floor covered with several inches of water, and spending the night in the cabin loft watching helplessly as the water continued to rise. Several smaller farms in the lower part of the valley were completely destroyed. The Cane Creek Mill, which had stood above the falls since 1831, was never rebuilt.

=== State park ===
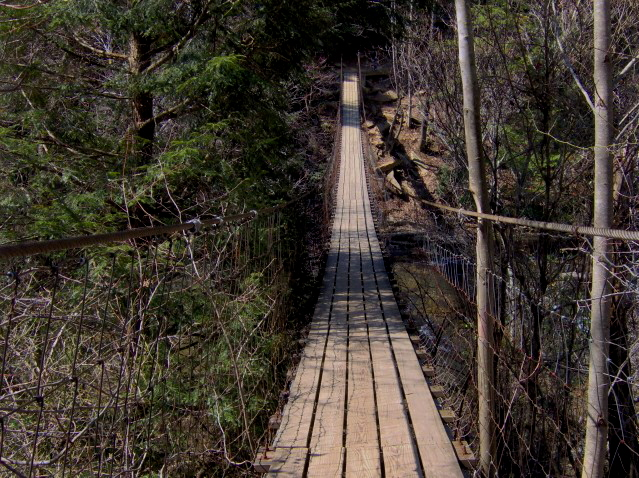
A swingbridge spans Cane Creek, near the nature center

In 1937, the U.S. government began purchasing the badly eroded land around Fall Creek Falls. The following year, the Works Progress Administration and the Civilian Conservation Corps began the work of restoring the forest and constructing park facilities. The National Park Service transferred ownership of the park to the State of Tennessee in 1944.

Millikan's Overlook is named after Glenn Millikan, who was head of the Department of Physiology at Vanderbilt University School of Medicine and son of Nobel Laureate Robert A. Millikan. Millikan was killed by a falling rock on May 25, 1947, while rock climbing "Buzzard's Roost," the cliff beneath the overlook.

The lake was constructed in 1966, with the valves closed on October 18 of that year. In 1968, work began on a modernization project that converted the state park into a resort park. This project included the construction of a new hotel, cabins, two pools, restaurant, amphitheater, general store, golf course, nature center, and trails. The $8 million (equivalent to $45.4 million in 2024) project was completed and dedicated by Governor Winfield Dunn on July 8, 1972.

In 2006, the State of Tennessee purchased 12,500 acres (51 km^{2}) of land along the White-Van Buren County line, in the vicinity of Bledsoe State Forest. The purchase was part of an effort to create an unbroken corridor of publicly owned land between Fall Creek Falls State Park and Scott's Gulf, a few miles to the north in White County.

== Park facilities and management ==
Fall Creek Falls State Park is open year-round and is managed by the Tennessee Department of Environment and Conservation. Park facilities currently include cabins, campgrounds, a visitor center, the Betty Dunn Nature Center, a marina, a general store, a snack bar, an 85 room hotel and a restaurant.

The park has 30 cabins – 20 fishermen cabins and 10 landside cabins. The park has 222 campsites in five different areas. All sites have tables, grills, water, and electricity and are served by six bathhouses.

An 18-hole golf course, Olympic-sized swimming pool, and several miles of hiking trails and paved biking trails are available in the park.

In 2013–2014, the park underwent some minor renovations of its facilities. The landside cabins and fisherman cabins were updated, and a privately operated zip line was installed at the Village Green.

=== Inn ===
The Fall Creek Falls Inn and Conference Center offered 144 guest rooms and over 5,000 square feet (460 m^{2}) of banquet space in five conference rooms, which accommodated up to 400 people. The buildings were designed with a brutalist architecture, having a combination of dark brick, and gray concrete with an exposed aggregate of smooth white, beige, tan, and brownish river stones. Built in the 1960s, with a rooms-only annex in the 1970s, they were closed in early April 2018 and demolished later that year, after Tennessee Governor Bill Haslam pushed for privatization and potential concessionaires refused to bid on serving the older facilities at the state's resort parks.

Cost overruns and underestimates, and a tight labor market in such a rural area, led to a need for more money from the Tennessee General Assembly in 2019, in turn allowing construction to resume in the autumn. It is expected to finally reopen in late summer or early autumn of 2021, with only 75 to 95 guest rooms, at a cost of slightly over $40 million (up from $29 million originally). It is currently unknown how much nightly room rates will be increased.

Both counties objected to the long-term closure of the inn due to the significant loss of lodging taxes and sales taxes, as well as employees who would be left without a job or forced to relocate or commute long distances to other state parks, even when the closure and reconstruction were expected to be far shorter. Proposals to build on the opposite side of the lake before closing the original inn were declined, largely due to the lack of sufficient sewerage facilities there.

== In the arts ==
Artist Gilbert Gaul, who gained national acclaim for his Civil War illustrations, operated from a studio south of Spencer on land currently owned by the park. The Gaul's Gallery restaurant at the inn was named for him.

Fall Creek Falls State Park was used as one of the primary filming locations for 20th Century Fox's fantasy adventure film Turbo: A Power Rangers Movie, Disney's live action film adaptation of The Jungle Book and the comic science fiction film Dr. Otto and the Riddle of the Gloom Beam, starring Jim Varney. Scenes from the 1986 movie King Kong Lives, starring Linda Hamilton, were filmed in the area of Cane Creek Cascades and Cane Creek Falls.
