= Van Buren County School District =

Van Buren County School District may refer to:

- Van Buren County Community School District - Iowa
- Van Buren County Schools - Tennessee
