= Cane Creek Cascades =

Waterfall in Tennessee, US

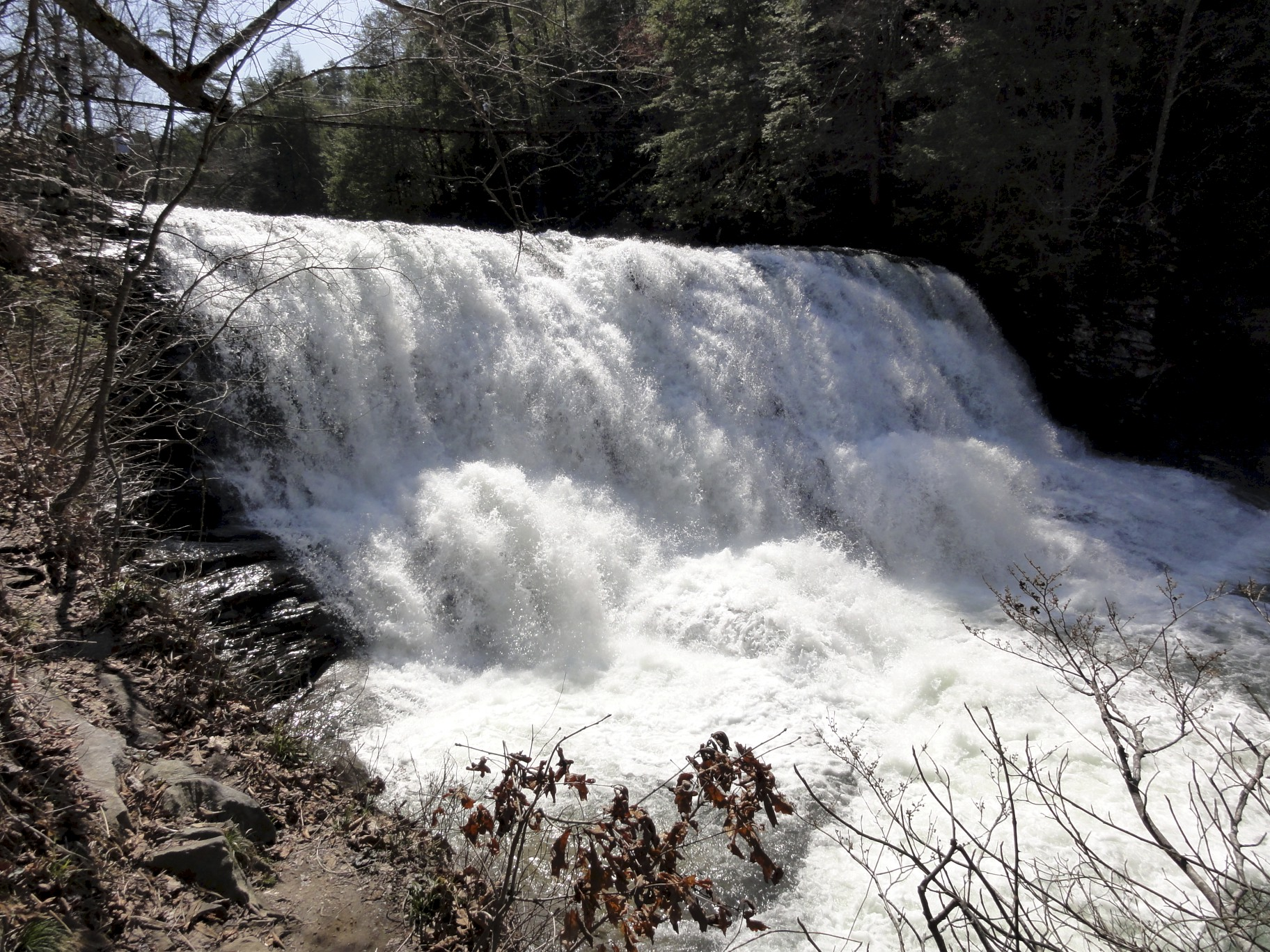
- Cane Creek Cascades
- Interactive map of Cane Creek Cascades
- Location: Spencer, Tennessee, US
- Coordinates: 35.661651°N 85.352138°W
- Type: Cascade
- Total height: 45 feet (14 m)
- Watercourse: Cane Creek

Cane Creek Cascades is a 45 feet (14 m) cascade located along Cane Creek, just above Cane Creek Falls. The falls are located near Spencer, Tennessee, in Fall Creek Falls State Park.
