= Rockhouse Falls =

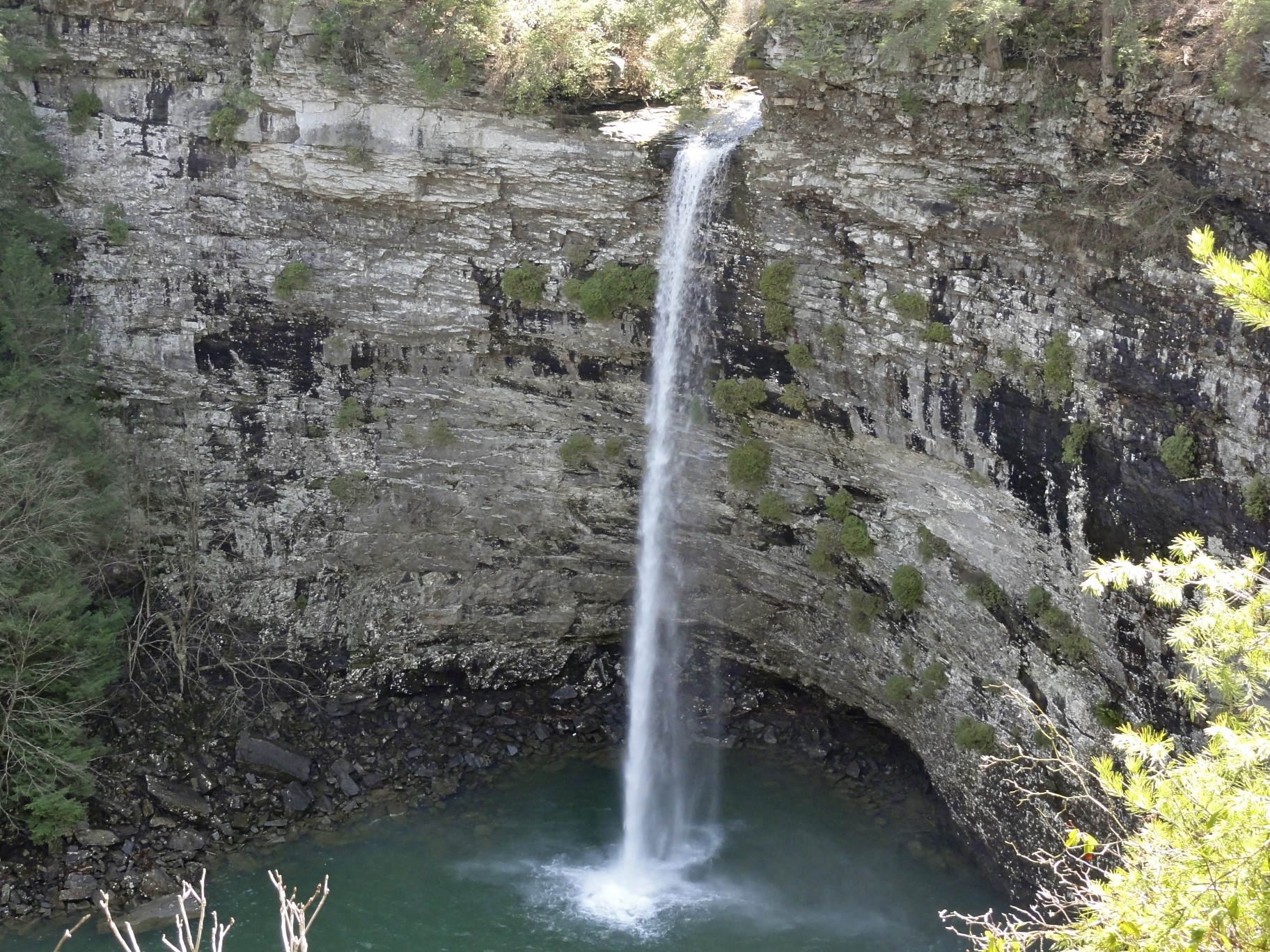
- Rockhouse Falls
- Interactive map of Rockhouse Falls
- Location: Spencer, Tennessee
- Coordinates: 35.663023°N 85.349783°W
- Type: Plunge
- Total height: 125 feet (38 m)
- Watercourse: Rockhouse Creek

Rockhouse Falls, is a 125 feet (38 m) plunge waterfall that marks Rockhouse Creek's confluence with Cane Creek. The waterfall, which shares a plungepool with Cane Creek Falls, is visible from the Gorge Trail and from the base of the Cane Creek Gorge. The falls are located near Spencer, Tennessee in Fall Creek Falls State Park.

== See also ==
- List of waterfalls
