= Coon Creek Falls =

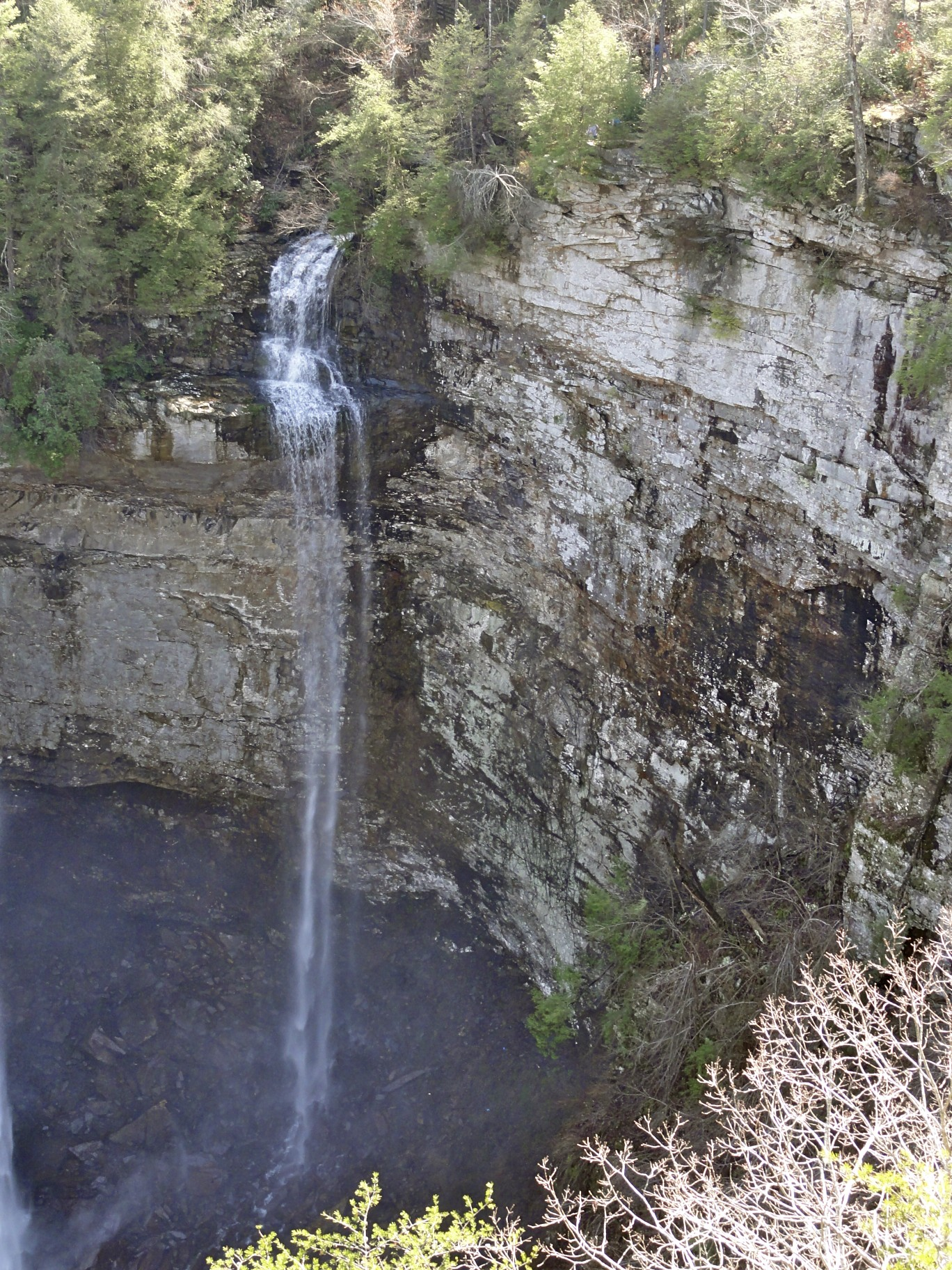
- Coon Creek Falls
- Interactive map of Coon Creek Falls
- Location: Spencer, Tennessee, United States
- Coordinates: 35.66642°N 85.35655°W
- Type: Plunge
- Total height: 250 feet (76 m)
- Watercourse: Coon Creek

Coon Creek Falls, is a 250 feet (76 m) plunge waterfall which shares a plunge pool with Fall Creek Falls. The falls are not always present, depending on the amount of precipitation in the area. The falls are located near Spencer, Tennessee in Fall Creek Falls State Park.
