= Julian Crabtree =

Julian Crabtree is a long distance swimmer and adventurer who works for Sky Sports. In 2009 he successfully swam all the waves of the Great Swim series. His 43-mile effort at the Great Swims was voted as the 2009's fourth Great Open Water Swim in the world.

In 2007 Julian also became the first South African and the third person to do the Arch to Arc solo. He ran from London down to Dover, swam the English Channel and then cycled from Calais to Paris. Only six people in the world have successfully achieved this.

In 2003 Julian ran over one thousand miles across the Alaskan Wilderness. Using a pulk to drag all his equipment, Julian followed the Serum Run trail from Nenana to Nome where he faced the plummeting temperatures of an Alaskan winter to compete the distance in 27 days.

== See also ==
- Great Swim
- Enduroman
