= Rumbling Falls Cave =

Cave in Tennessee, USA

Rumbling Falls Cave is a wild cave system within Fall Creek Falls State Park.

The cave contains the Rumble Room, the second largest cave chamber in the United States. The room has an area of around 26,400 square meters, and is 110 meters high.

Rumbling Falls is the 49th longest cave in the United States, with a total known length of 38.7 kilometers. Permits are required for visitation, and are available through Tennessee State Parks.

== See also ==
- List of caves
