= Crabtree Falls =

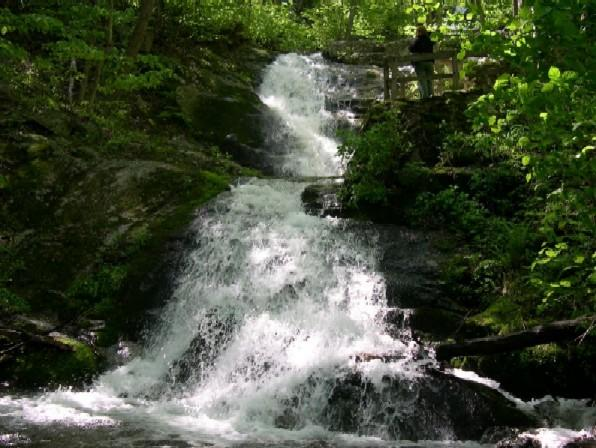
- A portion of Crabtree Falls
- Interactive map of Crabtree Falls
- Location: Nelson County, Virginia, U.S.
- Coordinates: 37.850833°N 79.078333°W
- Type: Cascade
- Total height: 1,200 feet (370 m)
- Number of drops: 5
- Longest drop: 400 feet (120 m)

Crabtree Falls is one of the tallest sets of waterfalls in the United States east of the Mississippi River. It is located in the George Washington National Forest in Nelson County, Virginia, off of Virginia State Route 56. The name of the falls is thought to have come from William Crabtree, who settled in this part of Virginia in 1777. L.A. Snead, former US Assistant Fuel Administrator (WWI), environmentalist and Nelsonian, spearheaded negotiations to secure land surrounding Crabtree Falls after plans to develop the falls into a resort area began in the late 1960s. Using personal and Congressional funds, the land deals were completed and the deeds transferred by LA Snead on June 3, 1968, to the National Forest System.

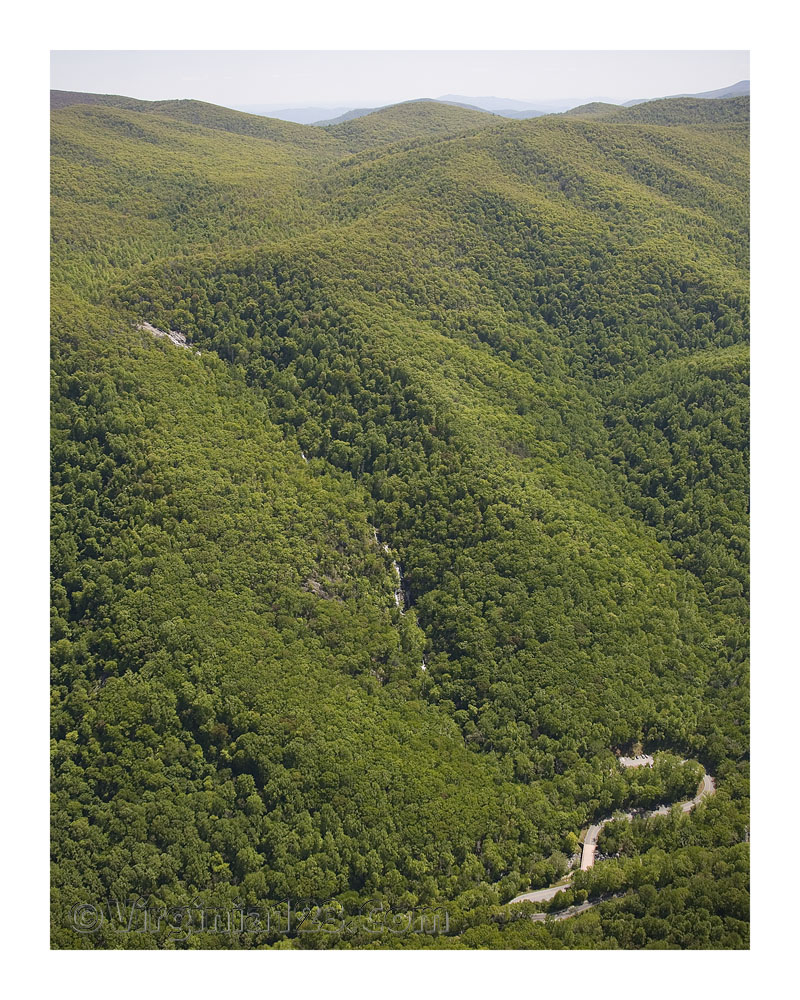
Aerial view

Fed by the Crabtree Creek upstream and draining into the Tye River downstream, the set of waterfalls which encompass the whole of Crabtree Falls are often credited with being 1,200 feet (370 m) high, but topographic maps show the total drop to be closer to 1,000 feet (300 m). Crabtree Falls is a series of cascading waterfalls, with five major cascades, the tallest of which drops about 400 feet (120 m), and several smaller cascades, all over a total distance of approximately 2,500 feet (760 m) horizontally. The cascade with a 400-foot (120 m) drop also gives Crabtree Falls the title of tallest vertical drop in a waterfall east of the Mississippi River. However, the title of tallest free-fall vertical drop goes to Fall Creek Falls in Tennessee's Fall Creek Falls State Park.

There is a trail to the waterfall maintained by the United States Forest Service called the Crabtree Falls Trail. Since the U.S. Forest Service first started tracking incidents in 1982, 30 known people have fallen to their deaths by slipping or from leaving the trail to gain further access to the waterfalls. Recent deaths occurred April 2013, June 2015, and most recently, August 29, 2015.

== See also ==
- List of waterfalls
- Fall Creek Falls
