= Fall Creek Falls =

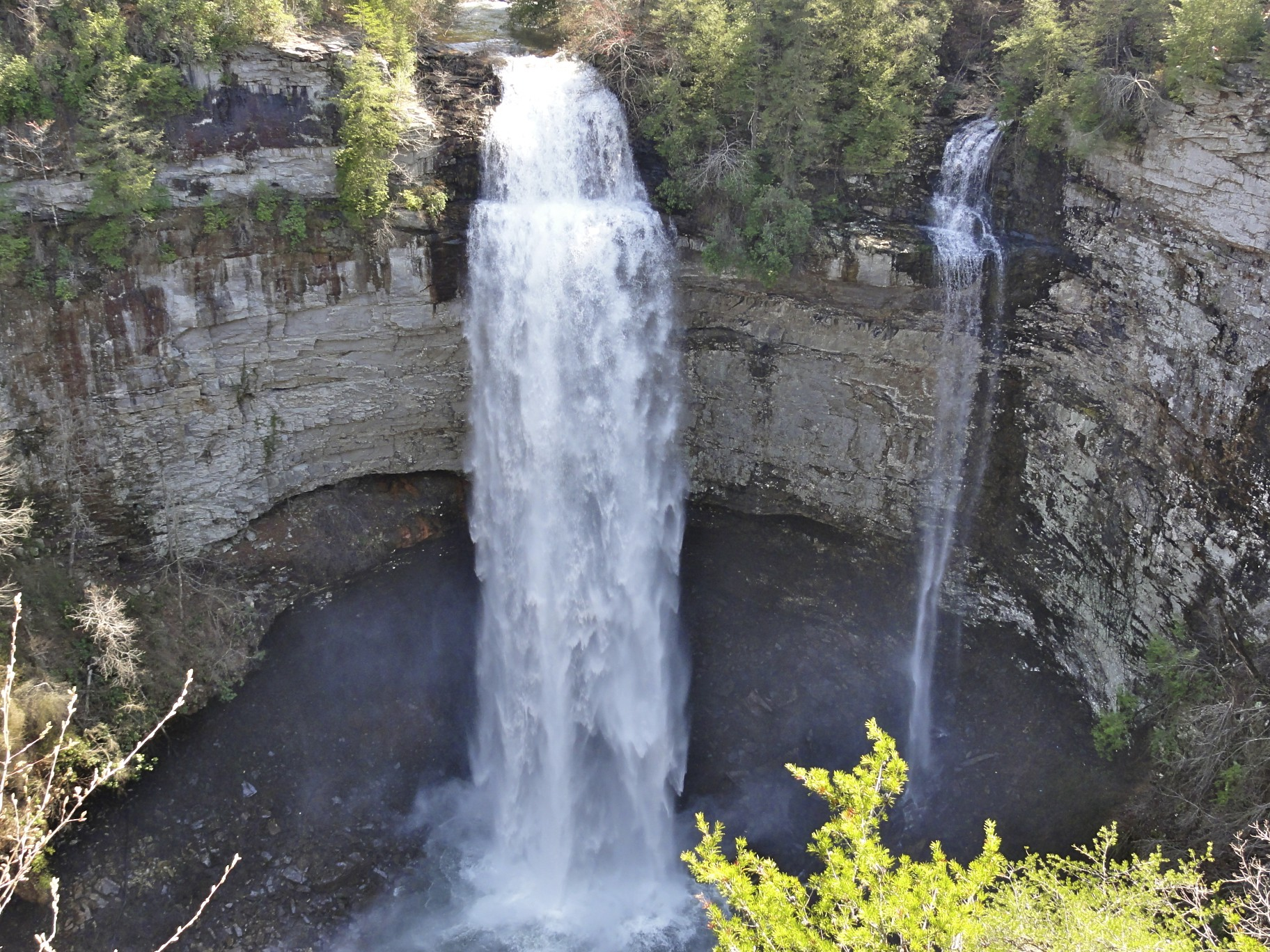
- Fall Creek Falls on the left, Coon Creek Falls on the right
- Interactive map of Fall Creek Falls
- Location: Spencer, Tennessee, United States
- Coordinates: 35°39′58″N 85°21′21″W
- Type: Plunge
- Total height: 256 feet (78 m)
- Watercourse: Fall Creek

Fall Creek Falls is a 256-foot (78 m) tall sheer-drop waterfall located in Fall Creek Falls State Park near Spencer, Tennessee. It is the tallest waterfall of such kind east of the Mississippi River (within the United States). A short trail leads from the parking lot atop the plateau down to the base of the gorge, giving access to the waterfall's plungepool. When water flow is sufficient, Coon Creek Falls shares a plungepool.

== See also ==
- List of waterfalls
- Crabtree Falls
