= Piney Creek Falls =

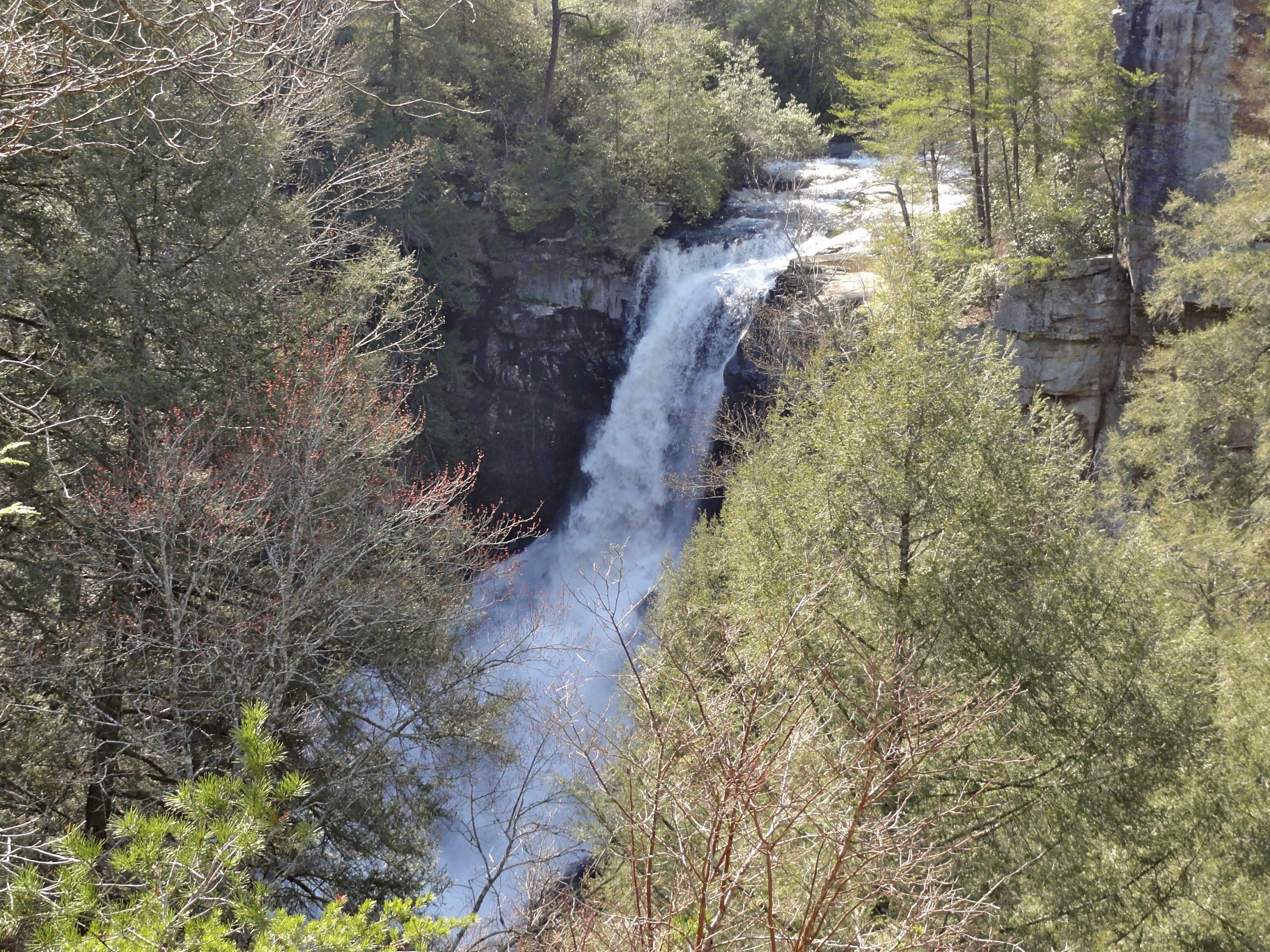
- Piney Creek Falls
- Interactive map of Piney Creek Falls
- Location: Spencer, Tennessee
- Coordinates: 35.677128°N 85.377255°W
- Type: Plunge/Cascade
- Total height: 95 feet (29 m)
- Watercourse: Piney Creek

Piney Creek Falls is a 95 feet (29 m) waterfall located along Piney Creek, a mile or so above its confluence with Cane Creek. A trail leads an overlook above the falls. There is no trail to the base of the falls which can only be accessed by rappel or a rugged hike up the Piney Creek Gorge. The falls are located near Spencer, Tennessee in Fall Creek Falls State Park.
