= Cave Hollow =

Valley in Tennessee, United States

Coordinates: 35.897873°N 87.323832°W

Cave Hollow is a valley in Hickman County, Tennessee, in the United States.

Cave Hollow was named from the presence of a cave at its mouth.
