= Thomas Crabtree Three-Decker =

- U.S. National Register of Historic Places
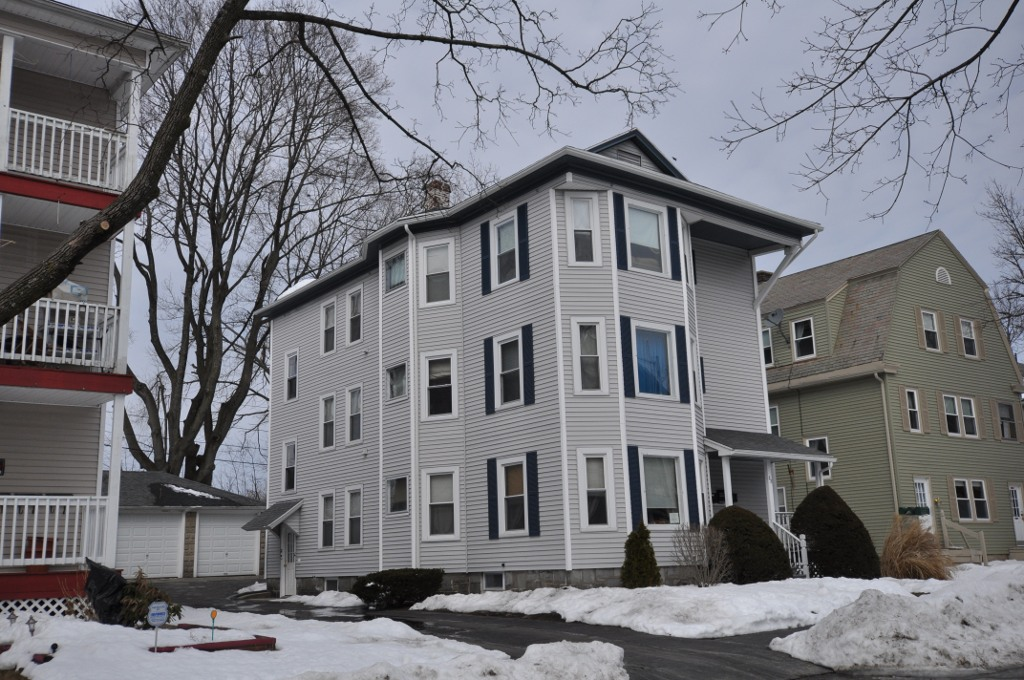

- Location within Massachusetts Location within the United States
- Location: 22 Haynes St., Worcester, Massachusetts
- Coordinates: 42°14′41″N 71°49′46″W
- Built: 1914
- Architectural style: Colonial Revival
- MPS: Worcester Three-Deckers TR
- NRHP reference No.: 89002383
- Added to NRHP: February 9, 1990

The Thomas Crabtree Three-Decker is historic triple-decker house in Worcester, Massachusetts. Built in 1914, it is a remarkably well-preserved and detailed example of the style in Worcester's University Park neighborhood. It has a typical side hall plan, and a hip roof that sports a small gable dormer on the front elevation. It has projecting bays on the front and left sides. Its builder and first owner was Thomas Crabtree, a local factory supervisor.

The building was listed on the National Register of Historic Places in 1990.

== See also ==
- National Register of Historic Places listings in southwestern Worcester, Massachusetts
- National Register of Historic Places listings in Worcester County, Massachusetts
