= Van Buren County Schools =

School district in Tennessee, United States

Location
- 293 Sparta Street; Spencer, Tennessee 38585

District information
- Type: County district for Van Buren County
- Motto: Where Kids Come First
- Director: Katina Simmons
- Schools: 2

Other information
- Website: vanburenschools.org

Van Buren County Schools is a school district headquartered in Spencer, Tennessee. It serves Van Buren County and operates two schools: Spencer Elementary School and Van Buren County High School.

== History ==
Van Buren County High School had a previous building used until 1939. The school board planned the development and construction of the current school building on September 10, 1936. The school board paid $309 for a 103-acre (42 ha) plot for the school and volunteers removed the trees. The school board paid an additional $20,000 to have the building constructed. In fall 1940 the current building opened. In 1956 the north side of the gymnasium had a dressing and stage area added on. Two new additions were installed to the current building in 1969 and 1974, the left and right wings, respectively. In 1985 a separate building for industrial arts was built.
