= Crabtree, Plymouth =

Suburb of Plymouth, Devon, England

Coordinates: 50°23′21″N 4°05′24″W

Crabtree
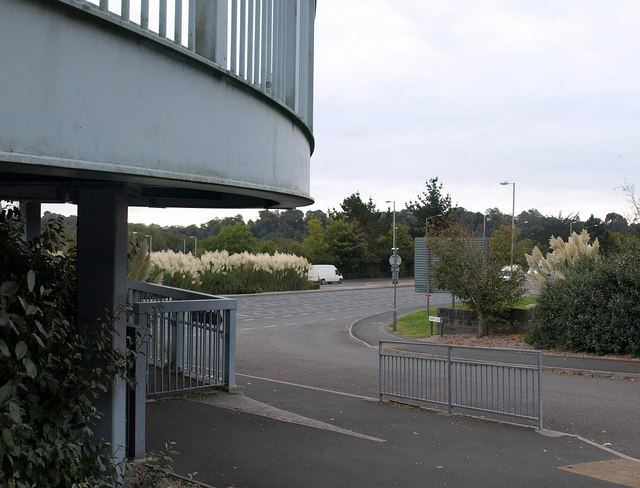

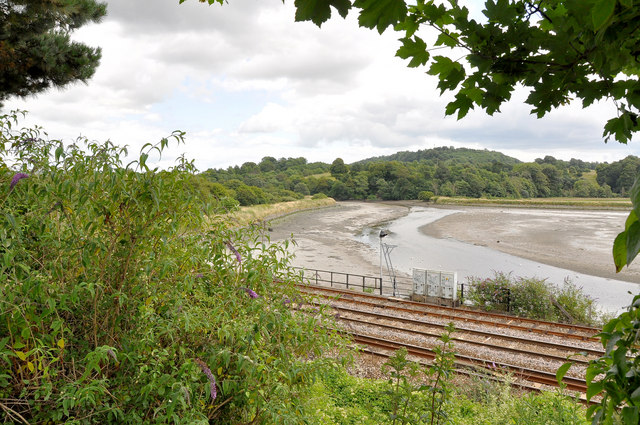
- Unitary authority: Plymouth
- Ceremonial county: Devon
- Region: South West
- Country: England
- Sovereign state: United Kingdom
- Post town: PLYMOUTH
- Postcode district: PL
- Police: Devon and Cornwall
- Fire: Devon and Somerset
- Ambulance: South Western

Crabtree is a suburb of Plymouth in the English county of Devon.

Originally, it was a small village beside the coaching route around the top of the Plym Estuary where travellers stopped before or after crossing the marshland known as Marsh Mills and the road to Plympton then Exeter and London. Now it is part of the city of Plymouth and has been substantially overbuilt by a superstore, one of the largest roundabouts in the west of England, and a flyover carrying the A38 road. There is now a travel lodge and small housing estate.

Additional hamlets also formerly stood on or near the site including 'Longbridge'. The city museum and art gallery collection, the National Trust at nearby Saltram House, and private collections contain paintings and water colours of the old Crabtree at the head of the estuary which was once one of the most attractive views in the area.

In 1872, John Marius Wilson's Imperial Gazetteer of England and Wales described Crabtree as: "a hamlet in Egg-Buckland parish, Devon; 2½ miles NNE of Plymouth. It has a post office under Plymouth."
