= Glenn Allan Millikan =

American physiologist (1906–1947)

- Born: May 23, 1906; Chicago, Illinois, U.S.
- Died: May 25, 1947 (aged 41); Fall Creek Falls State Park, Tennessee, U.S.
- Education: Harvard University; University of Cambridge
- Known for: Invention of practical Oximeter
- Father: Robert Andrews Millikan
- Scientific career
- Fields: Oximetry
- Workplaces: Vanderbilt University
- Doctoral advisor: Sir Joseph Bancroft; Lord Adrian

Glenn Allan Millikan (May 23, 1906 – May 25, 1947) was an American physiologist, inventor and mountaineer. Millikan invented the first practical, portable oximeter in 1940–1942. The Millikan oximeter "is generally acknowledged as the beginning of oximetry in physiology and clinical medicine." The word oximeter was introduced by Millikan.

== Early life ==
Millikan, son of physicist Robert Andrews Millikan, studied at the Harvard University and the University of Cambridge. During his doctorate studies in Cambridge he built a dual-wavelength colorimeter for blood oxygen level measurements. The Fellowship of Trinity College awarded Millikan a four-year scholarship for this work. The award allowed Millikan to continue research of myoglobin-oxygen reactions in Cambridge until 1937. After the outbreak of World War II Millikan was stranded in the United States. Unable to return to Cambridge, he accepted an unpaid laboratory appointment at the University of Pennsylvania and concentrated on bioluminescence research. Later, he obtained teaching assignments at the University of Pennsylvania and at Harvard.

== Career ==
In early 1940, Lord Adrian, Millikan's former advisor at Cambridge, asked Millikan to help the Royal Air Force with the development of a reliable breathing apparatus. According to Adrian, pilots regularly lost consciousness during high-altitude dogfights, and needed "an oxygen delivery system with a demand valve responsive to altitude and activity". Millikan built the device for monitoring the state of pilot's organism in flight (the Millikan oximeter) in 1940 and presented it to the American Physiological Society in 1941. The oximeter was integrated into the pilot's altitude mask and had to be clasped to the earlobe. The oxygen supply system, developed by Bendix Corporation, relied on the oximeter as the primary sensor in its feedback loop.

The earpiece of Millikan's oximeter (an open photocell-lamp assembly manufactured commercially by Coleman Electric) contained an incandescent light bulb, a set of red and green filters, and a selenium barrier level photocell. According to Millikan's early statements, light absorbance of green light was independent of blood oxygen level, absorbance of red light depended on it. However, in 1942 it was found that the flesh of human ear absorbs almost all green light. "Green light" sensed by Millikan's photocell was actually invisible infrared light emitted by the lamp and unaffected by green filter.

Millikan's wartime work outlined three basic problems of oximetry: absence of suitable theory, inability to differentiate between blood and other tissues in the path of light, and inability to differentiate between arterial, venous and capillary blood, of which only arterial blood was relevant to oxygen measurement. Millikan's own solutions to these challenges were poor. The third problem was solved by "fully flushing" the earlobe by heating it with the light bulb. The second one was not an issue in RAF breathing sets because they supplied pure oxygen. Calibration of the device for a patient breathing pure oxygen was quite straightforward.

In 1946, Millikan became head of the Department of Physiology at Vanderbilt University School of Medicine.

== Death ==
In 1938, Millikan married Frances Clare Leigh-Mallory, daughter of George Mallory, the mountaineer who died while climbing Mount Everest. In 1947 Millikan himself was killed by a falling rock while climbing "Buzzard's Roost" near Fall Creek Falls State Park, Tennessee.

After his death his parents sponsored a series of Glenn Millikan lectures at Vanderbilt.

== Sources ==
- Severinghaus, John W.; Astrup, Poul B. (1986). History of blood gas analysis. VI. Oximetry. Journal of Clinical Monitoring and Computing. Volume 2, Number 4, pp. 270–288. doi:10.1007/BF02851177.
- Zijlstra, Willem G. et al. (2000). Visible and near infrared absorption spectra of human and animal haemoglobin: determination and application. VSP. ISBN 90-6764-317-3.
