= Susan Crabtree =

American journalist

- Born: Susan Josephine Crabtree; Topeka, Kansas, U.S.
- Education: University of Southern California, B.S., broadcast journalism, political science, 1994
- Employer: RealClearPolitics
- Known for: Political journalism
- Title: White House correspondent
- Website: x.com/susancrabtree

Susan Crabtree is an American author and an award-winning journalist who currently serves as a senior national political correspondent for RealClearPolitics and a fellow with the Government Accountability Institute. She previously served as a senior writer for The Washington Free Beacon and spent five years as a White House Correspondent for the Washington Examiner. Prior stints include seven years as a senior editor and investigative reporter for The Hill. She is a frequent guest political analyst on Fox News, Newsmax, CNN, as well as numerous radio shows.

Crabtree also is the winner of the Dao Award for investigative reporting, which includes a $100,000 stipend. She won the award, which is sponsored by the Young Americans for Freedom's National Journalism Center, in November 2024 after breaking several blockbuster stories on the Secret Service's failures during and after the assassination attempts against Donald Trump, contributing to the resignation of Secret Service Director Kimberly Cheatle. Her previous reporting on Secret Service lapses and corruption preceded the resignation of a previous Secret Service director, Julia Pierson.

Crabtree is a native Californian who has spent three decades uncovering corruption, bribery, waste, and abuse in federal and state governments, prompting several investigations by the FBI, as well as House and Senate ethics committees. She is also known for her coverage of religious freedom issues and parental rights, and served as a 2016 media fellow at Stanford's Hoover Institution. In 2025, Crabtree appeared as a guest speaker at the Reagan Ranch Center in Santa Barbara and at the Heritage Foundation's annual symposium of lawyers and legal scholars.

Crabtree is also the author "Fool's Gold: The Radicals, Con-Artists, and Traitors Who Killed the California Dream and Now Threaten Us All." The book, released in March 2025, exposes California's corruption.

Peter Schweizer, the investigative author of several best-selling blockbusters, and Miranda Devine both endorsed the book with Schweizer also writing the forward. Fox News said the book "sounds the alarm about corruption in California" while spending several chapters detailing Newsom's ties to China's CCP. The Washington Examiner called "Fool's Gold," "a takedown of Gavin Newsom" and "an essential and exhilarating read" for "anybody seeking to understand the past, present, and future of the Democratic Party and the inner workings of its California stronghold."

Before joining The Hill in 2004, Crabtree covered Congress for Congressional Quarterly. She also spent three years as a reporter for Roll Call newspaper, chronicling the House Republican leadership, Congress' response to the September 11 attacks om 2001, as well as trade disputes and spending battles.

Crabtree has written for several magazines, including The Weekly Standard and The Economist-owned Capital Style, where she was a senior writer.

She graduated with honors in broadcast journalism and political science from the University of Southern California.

Crabtree was awarded the 2024 Dao Prize by the National Journalism Center for her investigation of the United States Secret Service after the assassination attempt on President Donald Trump.
