= Scott's Gulf =

Canyon in Tennessee

Coordinates: 35°49′44″N 85°17′42″W

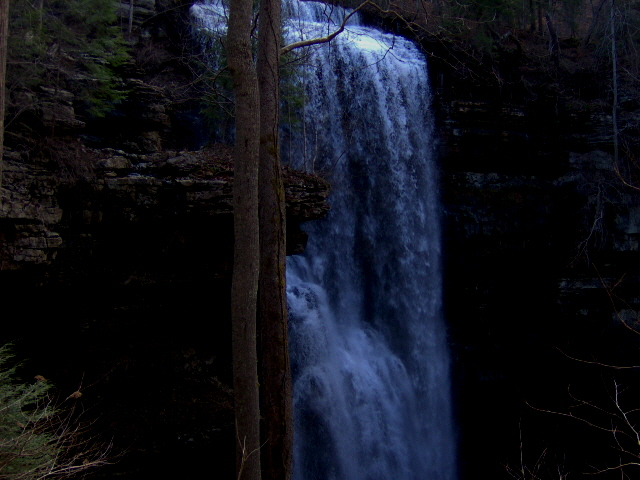
Virgin Falls

Scott's Gulf is a canyon situated along the Caney Fork River in White County, Tennessee, in the southeastern United States. The canyon stretches for approximately 18 miles (29 km) as the Caney Fork drops from the top of the Cumberland Plateau down to the eastern Highland Rim. This remote section of the river is home to a wilderness area consisting of a largely undisturbed deciduous forest, numerous waterfalls, caves and other geological formations, and Class IV and Class V whitewater rapids.

Roughly 10,000 acres (40 km^{2}) of Scott's Gulf is owned by the State of Tennessee, most of it situated within the Bridgestone/Firestone Centennial Wilderness, which is managed by the TWRA, and the Virgin Falls State Natural Area (Virgin Falls Pocket Wilderness Area), managed by TDEC through Fall Creek Falls State Park.

== Geography ==
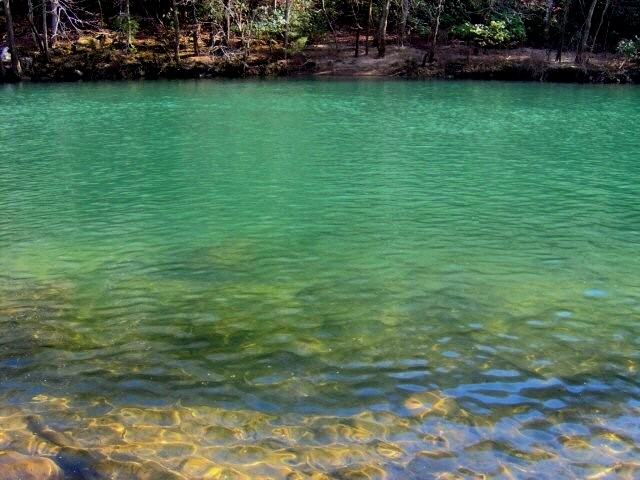
The Caney Fork at the base of Scott's Gulf

The Caney Fork rises near Campbell Junction in Cumberland County and gently drops in elevation as it winds its way southward across the Cumberland Plateau. Near the old mining town of Clifty, the river veers southwest and begins cutting Scott's Gulf as it drops nearly 700 feet (210 m) in elevation in just over 5 miles (8.0 km) before its confluence with Bee Creek at the base of the gorge. The river then calms and turns westward through the gorge's remote western section, which is characterized by steep walls and teal waters. Just after it exits the Scott's Gulf area, the Caney Fork absorbs Cane Creek (which drains Fall Creek Falls State Park several miles to the south) and the Calfkiller River en route to another dramatic gorge at Rock Island State Park.

During the summer and fall months, the Caney Fork is usually completely dry from well-above Virgin Falls to below the mouth of Scotts Gulf. This is caused by the fact that the entire Caney Fork sinks into the limestone river bed and follows cave passages below the river bed to emerge at a large spring. So, for roughly half of the year (winter and spring), the Caney Fork appears to be a normal river as it flows in its bed, but for the other half of the year (summer and fall), the Caney Fork flows completely underground for several miles. Sinking streams, dry creeks, caves, and large springs are features of karst geology.

Scott's Gulf is hemmed in on the north by three sections of the Plateau which rise steeply from the banks of the Caney Fork at roughly 850 feet (260 m) to the edge of the Plateau at 1,700 feet (520 m). On the northeast is Chestnut Mountain, which stretches from Polly Branch in the east to Big Laurel Creek in the west. Little Chestnut Mountain dominates the Gulf's north-central section, stretching from Big Laurel Creek in the east to Lost Creek in the west. Opposite Lost Creek on the northwest is a narrow backbone-like formation known as Pine Mountain, which parallels the Plateau's escarpment. Scott's Pinnacle dominates the southern section of Scott's Gulf.

== Natural features ==
=== Virgin Falls ===
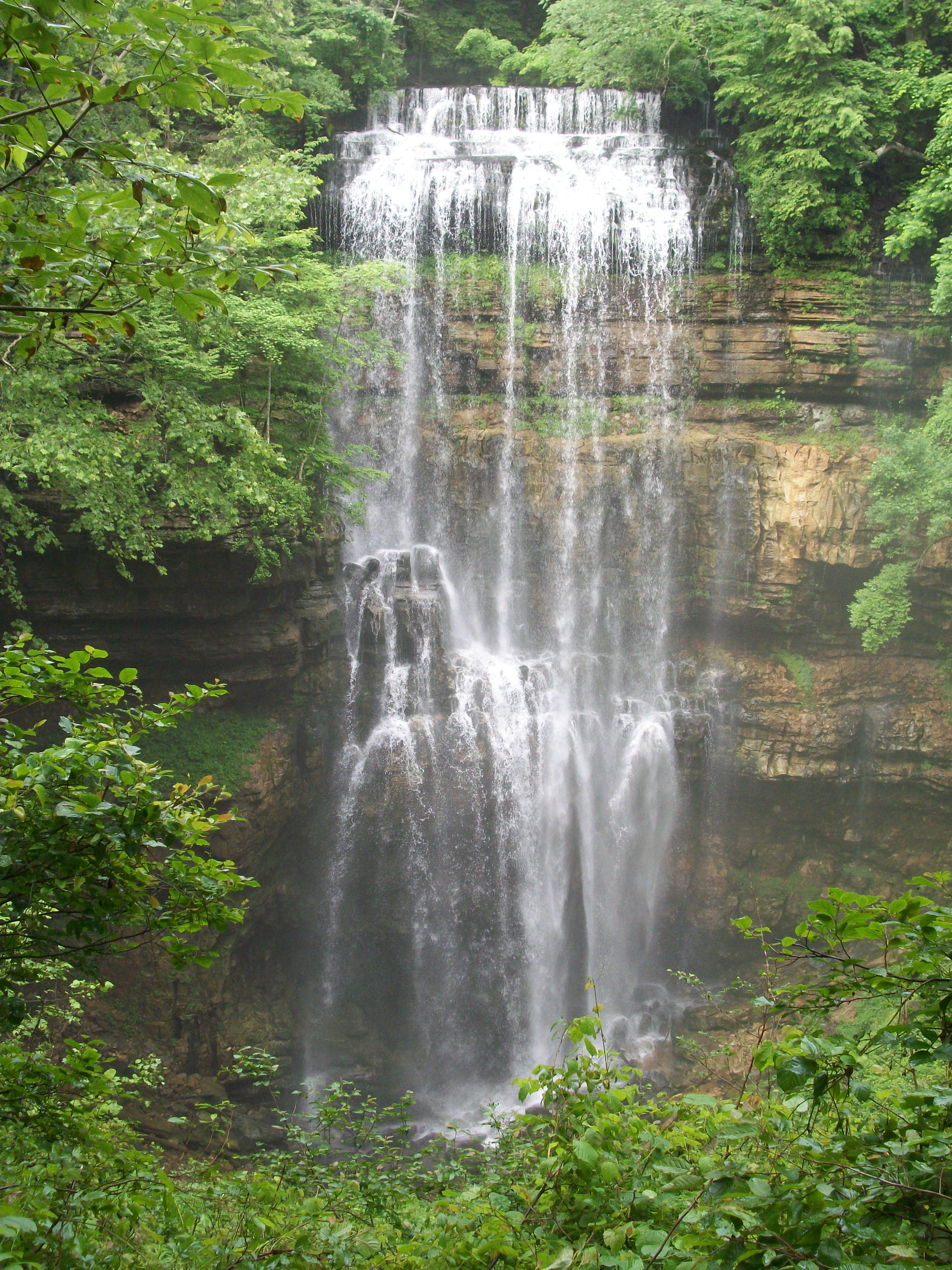
Virgin Falls

Virgin Falls, one of the area's most well-known and unique features, emerges from an underground stream on the south slope of Little Chestnut Mountain, drops 110 feet (34 m), and vanishes underground again. The source of the water for Virgin Falls is Virgin Falls Cave. The lower mouth to this cave is located approximately 150 feet upstream from the lip of the Falls. Virgin Falls Cave trends roughly southwest for 3,000 feet before ending in a massive ceiling collapse (breakdown). The cave stream easily flows through this breakdown, but no passage through the breakdown has been discovered. The cave itself is mainly one very large (30 feet wide and 40 feet high) stream passage. At the base of Virgin Falls, the water flows approximately 10 feet and falls into a large pit, the entrance to Virgin Falls Pit. At the bottom of this pit, the water follows cave passages and emerges as a spring at the base of the Cumberland Escarpment.

The flow of Virgin Falls varies from barely a trickle in late summer and early fall (the dry season), to a raging torrent during the late winter and early spring (the wet season). The source of this enormous amount of water during the wet season was a mystery for many years, but geologist Nicholas C. Crawford conducted dye tests that conclusively proved that the source of the water for Virgin Falls was a sinking creek in Lost Creek Cove, nearly three (3) miles to the north. Lost Creek Cove is a polje, a geologic feature that consists of a very large, closed depression in karst topography where all the water drains underground. One of the sinking creeks in Lost Cove re-emerges at Virgin Falls and the other re-emerges at Lost Creek Falls, 1.8 miles west of Virgin Falls. This area has a complex and fascinating underground flow pattern that has been studied for years by local cavers and geologists.

=== Other features ===
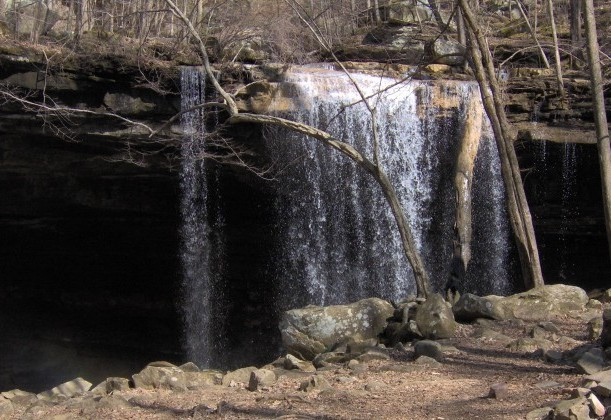
Big Laurel Falls

- Big Laurel Falls is situated along Big Laurel Creek a mile or so above the creek's mouth along the Caney Fork. There is a substantial limestone cave behind the falls.
- Sheep Cave/Sheep Falls, a 90 foot (27 m) waterfall and a cave near Virgin Falls on the slopes of Little Chestnut Mountain.
- Lost Creek Falls and Lost Creek Cave, a 60 foot (18 m) waterfall and large cave system located a few miles above the old community of Dodson near the western end of the gorge. Part of the Lost Creek State Natural Area.
- Polly Branch, a stream that drains the eastern section of Chestnut Mountain and empties into the Caney Fork just above the river's confluence with Bee Creek. Five small waterfalls are located along its brief watershed, including Jenny Branch Falls, Bee Branch Falls, and Upper, Middle, and Lower Polly Branch Falls.
- Copper Cascades, a relatively rapid section of the Caney Fork just above the mouth of Polly Branch.

== History ==
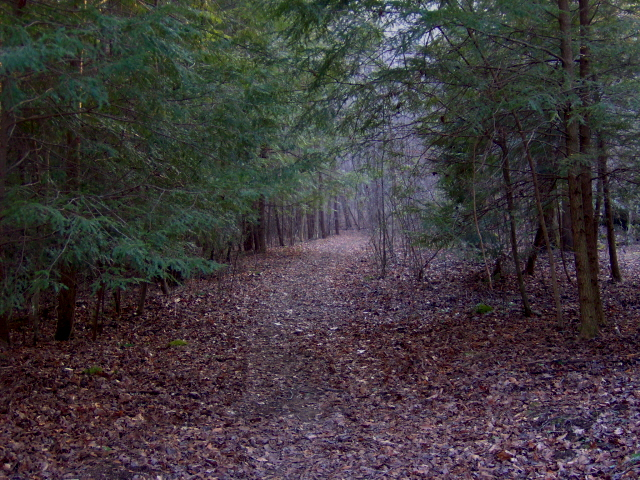
The Caney Fork Trail parallels an old wagon road and early 20th-century miners' paths

Settlers began arriving in the area now known as Scott's Gulf as early as the late 18th century. One of the first settlers in the area was James Davis who is recorded as being in the area as early as 1783 when his son Ephraim was born. Eventually the area, as well as much of the surrounding land, was ceded by the Cherokee in the Third Treaty of Tellico in 1805. Additional settlers soon followed, establishing two small communities in the area Dodson, and Bethesda. The early settlers used the power of the Caney Fork's rapids and nearby waterfalls to power grist mills, including the oldest mill in the county along Lost Creek. While the Caney Fork provided ample power for area mills, the mills were often wiped out when the volatile river flooded.

In 1840, architect Christopher Haufmann built the Bon Air Hotel just north of Scott's Gulf where the Plateau's elevation approaches 2,000 feet (610 m). In 1842, John B. Rodgers purchased the Bon Air Hotel, hoping to use the area's relatively cool summertime air and mineral springs to develop a health resort. While Rodgers had some early success, the hotel was destroyed during the U.S. Civil War.

In 1886, entrepreneur George Dibrell established the Bon Air Coal, Iron, and Lumber Company at the site of the old resort to exploit the area's natural resources. Dibrell managed to have the railroad extended from Sparta, and as demand for coal rose steadily into the 20th century, Bon Air began to boom. As operations moved southward into Scott's Gulf, the mining towns of DeRossett, Clifty, and Eastland sprang up along the edge of the Plateau above the Caney Fork. The boom ended with the Great Depression in the 1930s, and little remains of the area's coal mining history.

In the 1960s, Firestone, Inc. purchased a large tract of land above Scott's Gulf in hopes of developing a retreat for its employees. When the company was purchased by Bridgestone, however, the plans were dropped. In the 1980s and 1990s, Bridgestone/Firestone attempted to sell the property, but withdrew its offer in the face of local opposition after a rumor spread that a potential buyer sought to log the area. In the late 1990s, the company donated the bulk of its acreage to the state of Tennessee on the condition that it be used for low-impact activities and no structures be built in the gorge. The Virgin Falls Pocket Wilderness Area was donated by Bowater under similar conditions in 1978.

== Access ==
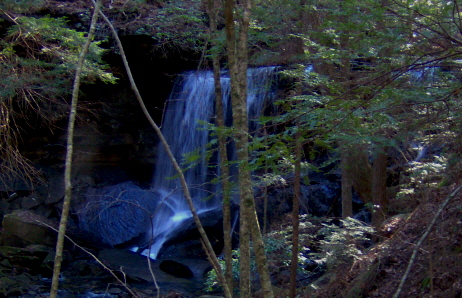
Upper Polly Branch Falls

A number of hiking trails criss-cross Scott's Gulf, with most of the publicly owned trails on the north side. Some of the trails are poorly maintained, but well blazed. Most of the marked trailheads are located along Scott's Gulf Road, which traverses part of Chestnut Mountain a few miles south of U.S. Route 70 between Sparta and Crossville. The trails in the Centennial Wilderness (Polly Branch, Yellow Bluff) are open year-round except during hunting season. Virgin Falls State Natural Area is open year-round.

The Virgin Falls Trail heads west from Scott's Gulf Road toward Big Laurel Creek, passes Big Laurel Falls, and descends rapidly to the Caney Fork bottom-lands where it forks, with one branch heading east to the Caney Fork Trail and the other branch heading west up the slope of Little Chestnut Mountain to Virgin Falls.

The Polly Branch Trail system follows Polly Branch and covers much of the stream's watershed. One branch leads to cliff overlooking the Bee Branch valley. Another heads northward across Chestnut Mountain. The trail intercepts the Caney Fork Trail near the mouth of Polly Branch.

The Caney Fork Trail parallels an old miners' path at the base of the gorge, connecting the Polly Branch and Virgin Falls trail systems.
