= Crabtree Ledge Light =

Lighthouse in Maine, US

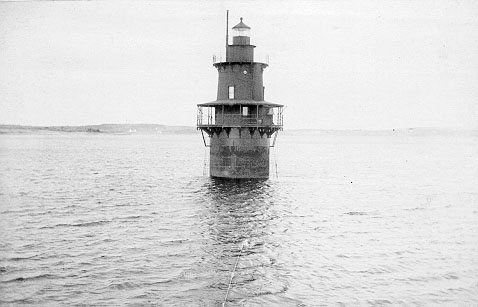
- Location: Frenchman Bay, Maine
- Coordinates: 44°28′18.4″N 68°13′15.1″W

Tower
- Constructed: 1890
- Shape: Conical Tower on Cylindrical Foundation
- Markings: Brown Tower, Black Foundation
- Fog signal: BELL: every 10s

Light
- Deactivated: 1933
- Focal height: 37 feet (11 m)
- Characteristic: F W with W Fl every 2 minutes

Crabtree Ledge Light was a sparkplug lighthouse on Frenchman Bay, Maine. It was first established in 1890 and deactivated in 1933. It was a brown conical tower on a black cylindrical pier located on Crabtree Ledge, about one mile off Crabtree Neck at the north end of Frenchman Bay. Crabtree is named after the American privateer Captain Agreen Crabtree, the first settler of Hancock.
