= Enduroman =

Ultra-distance triathlon in Europe

The Enduroman Arch to Arc Triathlon is an ultra-distance triathlon and is regarded as the “Hardest Triathlon on the planet” The triathlon starts with an 87-mile undulating run (140 km) from London's Marble Arch to Dover on the Kent coast, then a cross-Channel swim (shortest distance 21 miles/33.8 km) to the French coast, and finishes with a 180-mile undulating (289.7 km) bike ride from Calais to the Arc de Triomphe in Paris.

The clock starts at Marble Arch, London and stops at the Arc de Triomphe, Paris. Only 72 athletes globally have successfully completed the challenge. As of June 2025 the record for the course is 49 hours and 23 minutes, as set in 2023 by Julien Deneyer of Belgium, an effort that beat the previous record (set by Lionel Jourdan of France) by a single minute. On August 19, 2011, Rachael Cadman became the first woman to complete the challenge, in 97 hours, 37 minutes. Jacomina Eijkelboom finished in 66 hours and 56 minutes in 2019 to become the fastest female finisher. In July 2026, 24-year-old Sean Bannon became the youngest man and new fastest non-wetsuit athlete to complete the Arch to Arc, in a time of 64 hours, 42 minutes. On 21 September 2015, at 53 years old, Grantley Bridge became the oldest man to complete it, in 88 hours, 7 minutes.

In 2018, Frenchwoman Marine Leleu finished the competition in 69h52, setting the new female record for the event. She lost her title a few weeks later to Perrine Fages who finished the competition in 67 hours 21 minutes. The record was beaten next year by Jacomina Eijkelboom with 66 hours 56 minutes.

In August 2022, Richard Stabler (GB) ran 192km in total following an adverse change in the English channel weather during his first attempt (52km initially run) and then the full (140km) 2 days later on his ultimately successful A2A attempt.

Non-wetsuit world record holders are Sean Bannon (USA) with 64:42 in July 2026 and Jenny Smith (USA) with 72:26 in August 2022.

As of August 2022 the relay record is held by the six-person Team Manchester's Blood Brothers, with an overall time of 33 hours, 5 minutes in September 2014.

In August 2017, Douglas Waymark got into difficulty about half-way through the cross-Channel swimming element of the event. After being airlifted to William Harvey Hospital in Ashford, he later died.

== Results ==
These are the notable results of the solo event by year.

Men's results
Year	Gold medal	Timing	Silver medal	Timing	Bronze medal	Timing
2001	Edgar Ette	81h 5'				
2003	Andy Mouncey	115h 28'				
2007	Julian Crabtree	87h 37'	Steve Haywood	103h 48'		
2008	Tom Beaver	85h 56'				
2009	Dave Farrell	134h 51'				
2010	Jonnie Goss	106h 41'				
2012	Mark Bayliss	73h 39'				
2013	Patrick Lewis	64h 52'	Andrew Moore	67h 18'	Paul Gosney	69h 7'
2014	John Van Wisse	61h 27'	Elad Benjamin	79h 54'	Nick Thomas	80h 50'
2015	Freddie Iron	77h 17'	Andrei Rosu	85h 30'	Grantley Bridge	88h 7'
2016	Cyril Blanchard	59h 56'				
2018	Dany Perray	60h 18'	Ludovic Chorgnon	60h 39'	Jozsef Rokob	67h 19'
2019	Mayank Vaid	50h 24'	Julien Deneyer	52h 30'		
2020	Lionel Jourdan	49 h 24				
2022	Jean-Charles Harbonnier	55 h 50	Thomas Ostré	65 h 14	Arnaud de Meester	71 h 55
2023	Julien Deneyer (2)	49 h 23	Gaëtan Villeret	69 h 54	Ollie Strachan	86 h 17
2026	Sean Bannon (Non-Wetsuit WR)	64h 42'				

Women's results
Year	Gold medal	Timing	Silver medal	Timing
2011	Rachael Cadman	97h 37'	Michelle Santilhano	120h 16'
2012	Michelle Rothwell	92h 0'		
2013	Judith Martin	76h 23'	Rachel Hessom	167h 7'
2014	Joanne Rodda	78h 39'		
2017	Rachel Hill	88 h 30		
2018	Perrine Fages	67h 21'	Marine Leleu	69h 52'
2019	Jacomina Eijkelboom	66h 56		
