= Crabtree Creek =

Crabtree Creek may refer to one of these streams:

- Crabtree Creek (Neuse River), in the U.S. state of North Carolina
- Crabtree Creek (South Santiam River), in the U.S. state of Oregon
- Crabtree Creek (Whitney Creek, Kern River), in Tulare County, California

There are also streams named Crabtree Creek in the U.S. states of Arizona, Maryland, Pennsylvania, Tennessee, Texas and Virginia, as well as three other Crabtree Creeks in North Carolina.
