= Cane Creek Falls =

Waterfall in Spencer, Tennessee, US

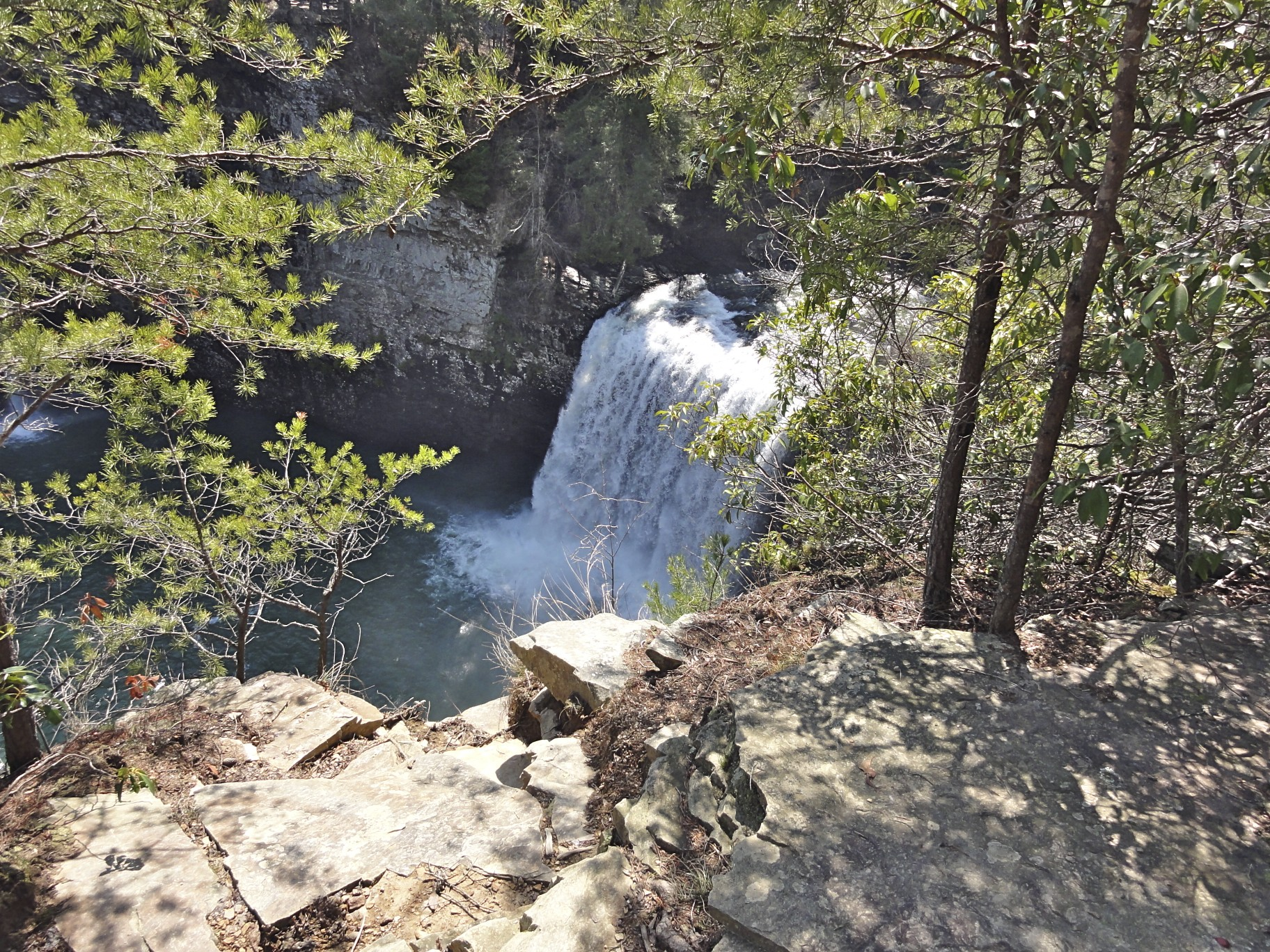
- Cane Creek Falls viewed from the Gorge Trail
- Interactive map of Cane Creek Falls
- Location: Spencer, Tennessee
- Coordinates: 35.663045°N 85.350144°W
- Type: Plunge
- Total height: 85 feet (26 m)
- Watercourse: Cane Creek

Cane Creek Falls is an 85-foot (26 m) plunge waterfall located along Cane Creek near Spencer, Tennessee, above the creek's confluence with Rockhouse Creek and Fall Creek. The waterfall is visible from the Gorge Trail and from the base of the Cane Creek Gorge, which can be accessed via the Cable Trail. The falls are located in Fall Creek Falls State Park.
