= Robert Millikan =

American physicist (1868–1953)

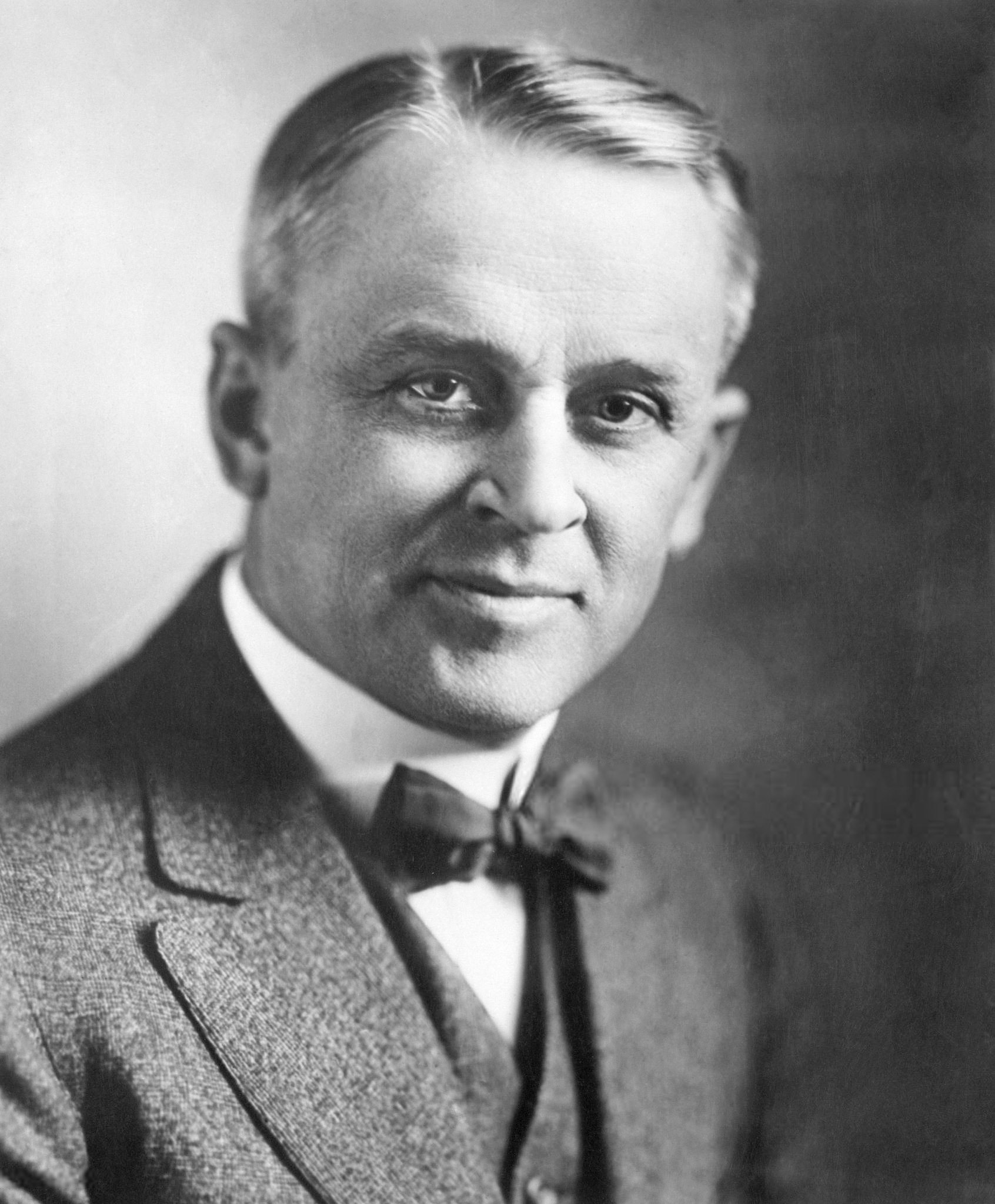
- Millikan in 1923

1st Chairman of the Executive Council, California Institute of Technology
- In office 1921–1945
- Preceded by: Office established
- Succeeded by: Lee DuBridge

Personal details
- Born: Robert Andrews Millikan; March 22, 1868 Morrison, Illinois, U.S.
- Died: December 19, 1953 (aged 85) San Marino, California, U.S.
- Resting place: Forest Lawn Memorial Park
- Spouse: Greta Irvin Blanchard (m. 1902; died 1953)
- Children: Clark; Glenn; Max
- Education: Oberlin College: B.A., Classics; M.A., Physics; Columbia University: Ph.D., Physics
- Known for: Oil drop experiment; Photoelectric effect
- Awards: Comstock Prize in Physics (1913); AIEE Edison Medal (1922); Nobel Prize in Physics (1923); Hughes Medal (1923); Matteucci Medal (1925); ASME Medal (1926); Franklin Medal (1937); Oersted Medal (1940); Medal for Merit (1949)
- Scientific career
- Fields: Physics
- Workplaces: University of Chicago; California Institute of Technology
- Thesis: On the polarization of light emitted from the surfaces of incandescent solids and liquids (1895)
- Doctoral advisor: Ogden Rood
- Doctoral students: See list: Carl David Anderson; Ira Sprague Bowen; Robert Brode; Karl Darrow; Arthur Jeffrey Dempster; Robley D. Evans; Harvey Fletcher; Mervin Kelly; Vern Oliver Knudsen; Charles Lauritsen; Leonard Benedict Loeb; Walter C. Michels; Melvin Mooney; William H. Pickering; Ralph Sawyer; Luke Chia-Liu Yuan

Robert Andrews Millikan (March 22, 1868 – December 19, 1953) was an American experimental physicist who received the Nobel Prize in Physics in 1923 "for his work on the elementary charge of electricity and on the photoelectric effect."

As Chairman of the Executive Council of Caltech (the school's governing body at the time) from 1921 to 1945, Millikan helped to turn the school into one of the leading research institutions in the United States. He also served on the board of trustees for Science Service, now known as Society for Science & the Public, from 1921 to 1953.

== Biography ==
Robert Andrews Millikan was born on March 22, 1868, in Morrison, Illinois, the second son of six children of Mary Jane Millikan (née Andrews), former Dean of Women at Olivet College, and Silas Franklin Millikan, a Congregationalist minister. In 1872, the family moved to Maquoketa, Iowa, where Millikan attended Maquoketa Community High School.

After briefly working as a court reporter, Millikan entered Oberlin College, where he majored in classics and studied mathematics, using the latter to teach physics. He graduated from Oberlin in 1891, and continued teaching physics for two years, developing an interest in the subject. After obtaining his master's degree in Physics in 1893, he became a Fellow in Physics at Columbia University, where he received a Doctor of Philosophy in 1895 for a thesis on the polarization of light emitted from incandescent surfaces.

At the close of my sophomore year [...] my Greek professor [...] asked me to teach the course in elementary physics in the preparatory department during the next year. To my reply that I did not know any physics at all, his answer was, "Anyone who can do well in my Greek can teach physics." "All right," said I, "you will have to take the consequences, but I will try and see what I can do with it." I at once purchased an Avery's Elements of Physics, and spent the greater part of my summer vacation of 1889 at home – trying to master the subject. [...] I doubt if I have ever taught better in my life than in my first course in physics in 1889. I was so intensely interested in keeping my knowledge ahead of that of the class that they may have caught some of my own interest and enthusiasm.

Millikan's enthusiasm for education continued throughout his career, and he was the coauthor of a popular and influential series of introductory textbooks, which were ahead of their time in many ways. Compared to other books of the time, they treated the subject more in the way in which it was thought about by physicists. They also included many homework problems that asked conceptual questions, rather than simply requiring the student to plug numbers into a formula.

In 1895, Millikan travelled to Germany, and spent one year at the universities of Berlin and Göttingen. He returned to the United States in 1896 to become an assistant in the newly established Ryerson Laboratory at the University of Chicago. He was appointed Professor of Physics at Chicago in 1910.

In 1921, under the persuasion of George Ellery Hale and Arthur Amos Noyes, Millikan became Director of the Norman Bridge Laboratory of Physics at the California Institute of Technology (Caltech), a position he held until his retirement in 1945. During this time, he also served as Chairman of the Executive Council of Caltech.

Millikan died on December 19, 1953, in San Marino, California, at the age of 85. He is interred in the "Court of Honor" at Forest Lawn Memorial Park Cemetery in Glendale, California.

== Research ==
=== Oil drop experiment ===
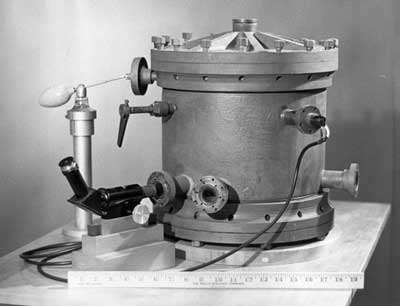
Millikan's original oil-drop apparatus, c. 1909–1910.

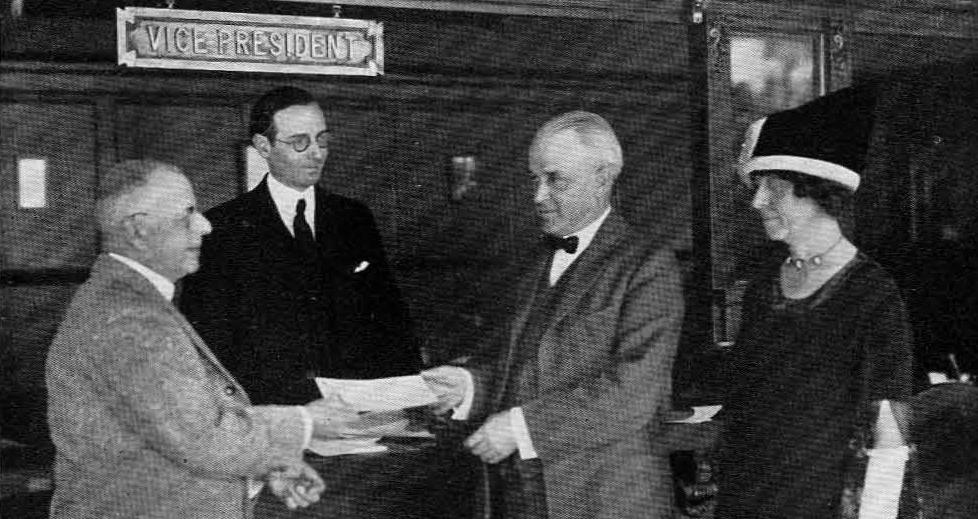
Millikan receives a check for over $40,000 for winning the Nobel Prize, 1924.

In 1909, Millikan worked on an experiment in which he measured the charge of a single electron. J. J. Thomson had already discovered the charge-to-mass ratio of the electron. However, the actual charge and mass values were unknown. Therefore, if one of these two values were to be discovered, the other could easily be calculated. Millikan and his then graduate student, Harvey Fletcher, used the oil drop experiment to measure the charge of the electron (as well as the electron mass, and Avogadro constant, since their relation to the electron charge was known).

Millikan took sole credit in return for Fletcher claiming full authorship on a related result for his dissertation. Millikan went on to win the 1923 Nobel Prize in Physics, in part for this work, and Fletcher kept the agreement a secret until his death. After a publication on his first results in 1910, contradictory observations by Felix Ehrenhaft started a controversy between the two physicists. After improving his setup, Millikan published his seminal study in 1913.

The elementary charge is one of the fundamental physical constants, and accurate knowledge of its value is of great importance. His experiment measured the force on tiny charged droplets of oil suspended against gravity between two metal electrodes. Knowing the electric field, the charge on the droplet could be determined. Repeating the experiment for many droplets, Millikan showed that the results could be explained as integer multiples of a common value (1.592 × 10^{−19} coulomb), which is the charge of a single electron. That this is somewhat lower than the modern value of 1.602 176 53(14) × 10^{−19} coulomb is probably due to Millikan's use of an inaccurate value for the viscosity of air.

Although at the time of Millikan's oil drop experiment, it was becoming clear that there exist such things as subatomic particles, not everyone was convinced. Experimenting with cathode rays in 1897, J. J. Thomson had discovered negatively charged "corpuscles", as he called them, with a charge-to-mass ratio 1840 times that of a hydrogen ion. Similar results had been found by George FitzGerald and Walter Kaufmann. Most of what was then known about electricity and magnetism could be explained on the basis that charge is a continuous variable. This in much the same way that many of the properties of light can be explained by treating it as a continuous wave rather than as a stream of photons.

The beauty of the oil drop experiment is that as well as allowing quite accurate determination of the fundamental unit of charge, Millikan's apparatus also provided a 'hands on' demonstration that charge is actually quantized. General Electric Company's Charles Steinmetz, who had previously thought that charge is a continuous variable, became convinced otherwise after working with Millikan's apparatus.

==== Data selection controversy ====
There is some controversy over selectivity in Millikan's use of results from his second experiment measuring the electron charge. This issue has been discussed by Allan Franklin, a former high-energy experimentalist and current philosopher of science at the University of Colorado. Franklin contends that Millikan's exclusions of data do not affect the final value of the charge obtained, but that Millikan's substantial "cosmetic surgery" reduced the statistical error. This enabled Millikan to give the charge of the electron to better than one-half of one percent. In fact, if Millikan had included all of the data he discarded, the error would have been less than 2%. While this would still have resulted in Millikan's having measured the charge of e^{−} better than anyone else at the time, the slightly larger uncertainty might have allowed more disagreement with his results within the physics community, which Millikan likely tried to avoid. David Goodstein argues that Millikan's statement, that all drops observed over a 60 day period were used in the paper, was clarified in a subsequent sentence that specified all "drops upon which complete series of observations were made". Goodstein attests that this is indeed the case and notes that five pages of tables separate the two sentences.

=== Photoelectric effect ===
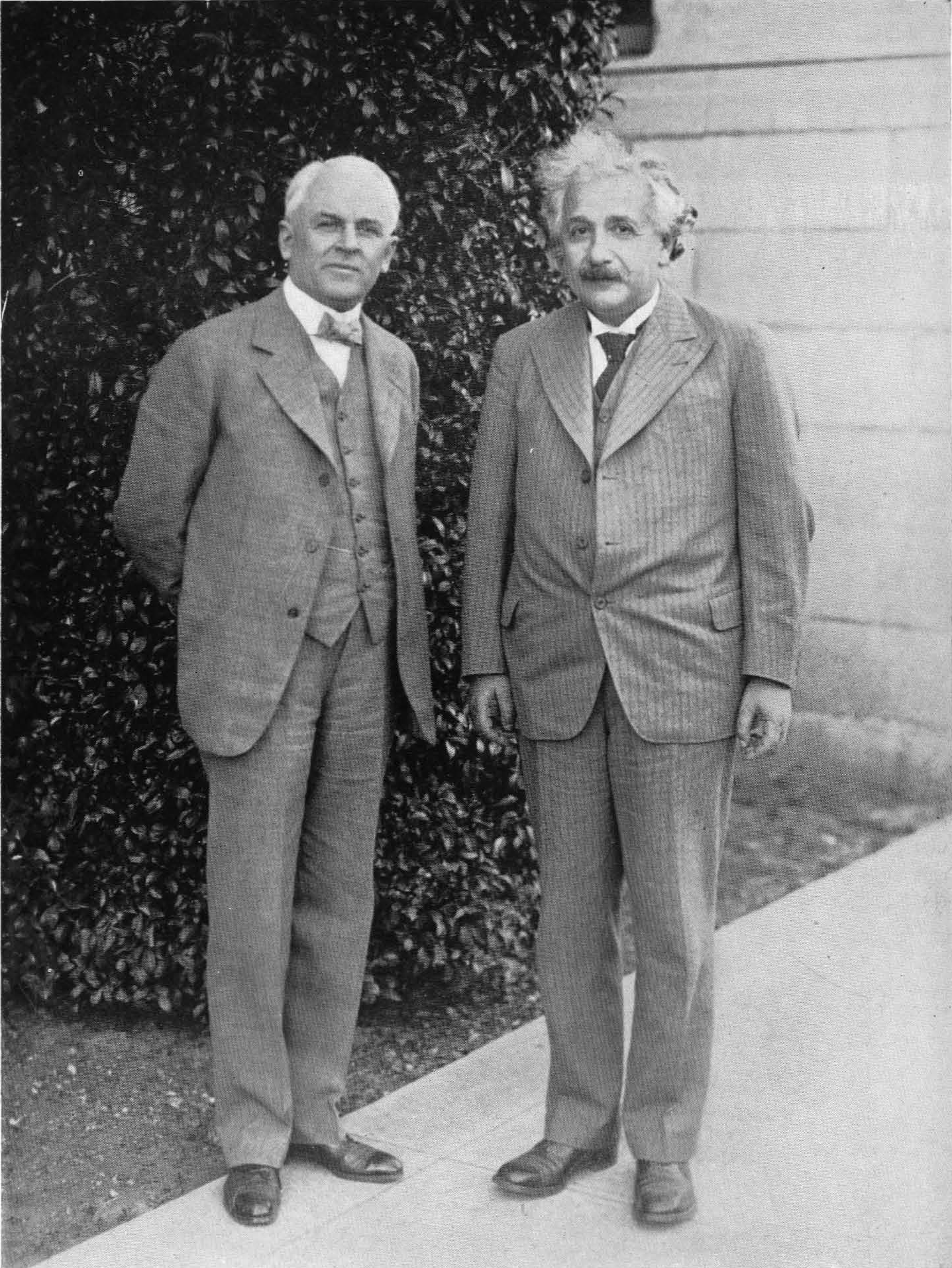
Millikan and Albert Einstein at Caltech, 1932.

When Albert Einstein published his 1905 paper on the particle theory of light, Millikan was convinced that it had to be wrong, because of the vast body of evidence that had already shown that light was a wave. He undertook a decade-long experimental program to test Einstein's theory, which required building what he described as "a machine shop in vacuo" in order to prepare the very clean metal surface of the photoelectrode. His results, published in 1914, confirmed Einstein's predictions in every detail, but Millikan was not convinced of Einstein's interpretation, and as late as 1916 he wrote, "Einstein's photoelectric equation... cannot in my judgment be looked upon at present as resting upon any sort of a satisfactory theoretical foundation," even though "it actually represents very accurately the behavior" of the photoelectric effect. In his 1950 autobiography, however, he declared that his work "scarcely permits of any other interpretation than that which Einstein had originally suggested, namely that of the semi-corpuscular or photon theory of light itself.

Although Millikan's work formed some of the basis for modern particle physics, he was conservative in his opinions about 20th century developments in physics, as in the case of the photon theory. Another example is that his textbook, as late as the 1927 version, unambiguously states the existence of the ether, and mentions Einstein's theory of relativity only in a noncommittal note at the end of the caption under Einstein's portrait, stating as the last in a list of accomplishments that he was "author of the special theory of relativity in 1905 and of the general theory of relativity in 1914, both of which have had great success in explaining otherwise unexplained phenomena and in predicting new ones."

Millikan is also credited with measuring the value of the Planck constant by using photoelectric emission graphs of various metals.

=== Cosmic rays ===
At Caltech, most of Millikan's scientific research focused on the study of cosmic rays (a term he coined). In the 1930s, he entered into a debate with Arthur Compton over whether cosmic rays were composed of high-energy photons (Millikan's view) or charged particles (Compton's view). Millikan thought his cosmic ray photons were the "birth cries" of new atoms continually being created to counteract entropy and prevent the heat death of the universe. Compton was eventually proven right by the observation that cosmic rays are deflected by the Earth's magnetic field (hence must be charged particles).

== Other work ==
Millikan was Vice Chairman of the National Research Council during World War I. During that time, he helped to develop anti-submarine and meteorological devices. During his wartime service, an investigation by Inspector General William T. Wood determined that Millikan had attempted to steal another inventor's design for a centrifugal gun in order to profit personally. Wood recommended termination of Millikan's army commission, but a subsequent investigation by Frank McIntyre, the executive assistant to the army chief of staff, exonerated Millikan. After the War, Millikan contributed to the works of the League of Nations' Committee on Intellectual Cooperation (from 1922, in replacement to George E. Hale, to 1931), with other prominent researchers (Marie Curie, Albert Einstein, Hendrik Lorentz, etc.).

In the aftermath of the 1933 Long Beach earthquake, Millikan chaired the Joint Technical Committee on Earthquake Protection. They authored a report proposing means to minimize life and property loss in future earthquakes by advocating stricter building codes.

== Westinghouse Time Capsules ==
In 1938, he wrote a short passage to be placed in the Westinghouse Time Capsules:

At this moment, August 22, 1938, the principles of representative ballot government, such as are represented by the governments of the Anglo-Saxon, French, and Scandinavian countries, are in deadly conflict with the principles of despotism, which up to two centuries ago had controlled the destiny of man throughout practically the whole of recorded history. If the rational, scientific, progressive principles win out in this struggle there is a possibility of a warless, golden age ahead for mankind. If the reactionary principles of despotism triumph now and in the future, the future history of mankind will repeat the sad story of war and oppression as in the past.

== Personal life ==
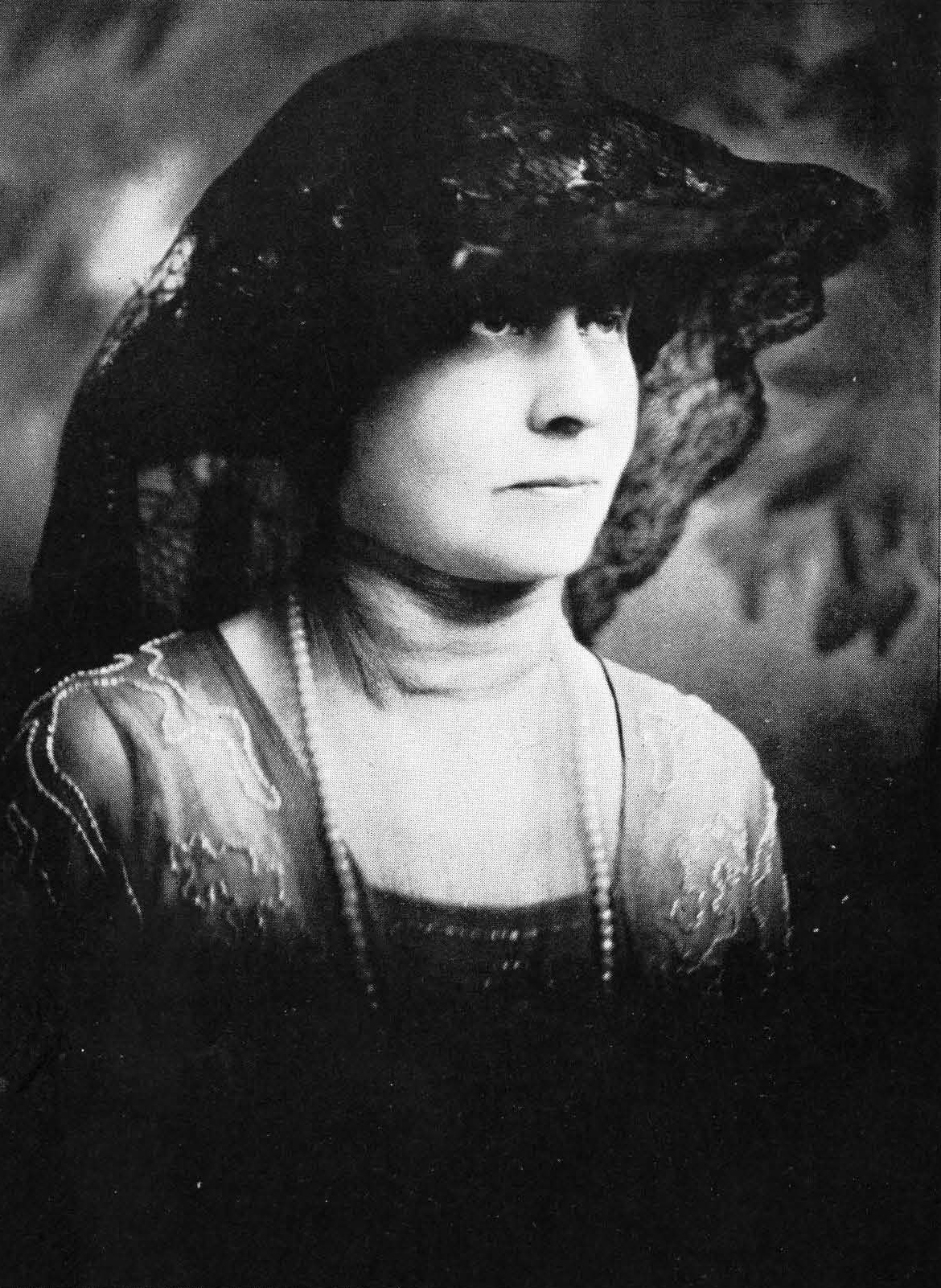
Greta Millikan in 1923

In 1902, Millikan married Greta Irvin Blanchard (1876–1953), who pre-deceased him by 3 months. They had three sons: Clark, Glenn, and Max.

Millikan was a member of the organizing committee of the 1932 Los Angeles Olympics, and in his private life was an enthusiastic tennis player.

A religious man and the son of a minister, in his later life, Millikan argued strongly for a complementary relationship between science and Christianity. He dealt with this in his Terry Lectures at Yale in 1926–27, published as Evolution in Science and Religion. He was a Christian theist and proponent of theistic evolution.

A more controversial belief of his was eugenics. Millikan was one of the initial trustees of the Human Betterment Foundation and praised San Marino, California for being "the westernmost outpost of Nordic civilization ... [with] a population which is twice as Anglo-Saxon as that existing in New York, Chicago, or any of the great cities of this country." In 1936, Millikan advised the president of Duke University in the then-racial segregated southern United States against recruiting a female physicist and argued that it would be better to hire young men.

== Recognition ==
=== Awards ===
Year	Organization	Award	Citation	Ref.
1913	National Academy of Sciences	Comstock Prize in Physics	—	
1922	American Institute of Electrical Engineers	AIEE Edison Medal	"For his experimental work in electrical science."	
1923	Royal Swedish Academy of Sciences	Nobel Prize in Physics	"For his work on the elementary charge of electricity and on the photoelectric effect."	
1923	Royal Society	Hughes Medal	"For his determination of the electronic charge and of other physical constants."	
1925	Accademia dei XL	Matteucci Medal	—	
1926	American Society of Mechanical Engineers	ASME Medal	—	
1937	Franklin Institute	Franklin Medal	"For the measurement of the charge on an electron and description of Planck's constant, and for the study of cosmic radiation."	
1940	American Association of Physics Teachers	Oersted Medal	—	

=== Memberships ===
Year	Organization	Type	Ref.
1914	American Philosophical Society	Member	
1914	American Academy of Arts and Sciences	Member	
1915	National Academy of Sciences	Member	
1950	Optical Society of America	Honorary Member	

=== National awards and honors ===
Year	Country	Award / honor	Ref.
1940	China	Order of Jade	
1949	United States	Medal for Merit	

== Legacy ==
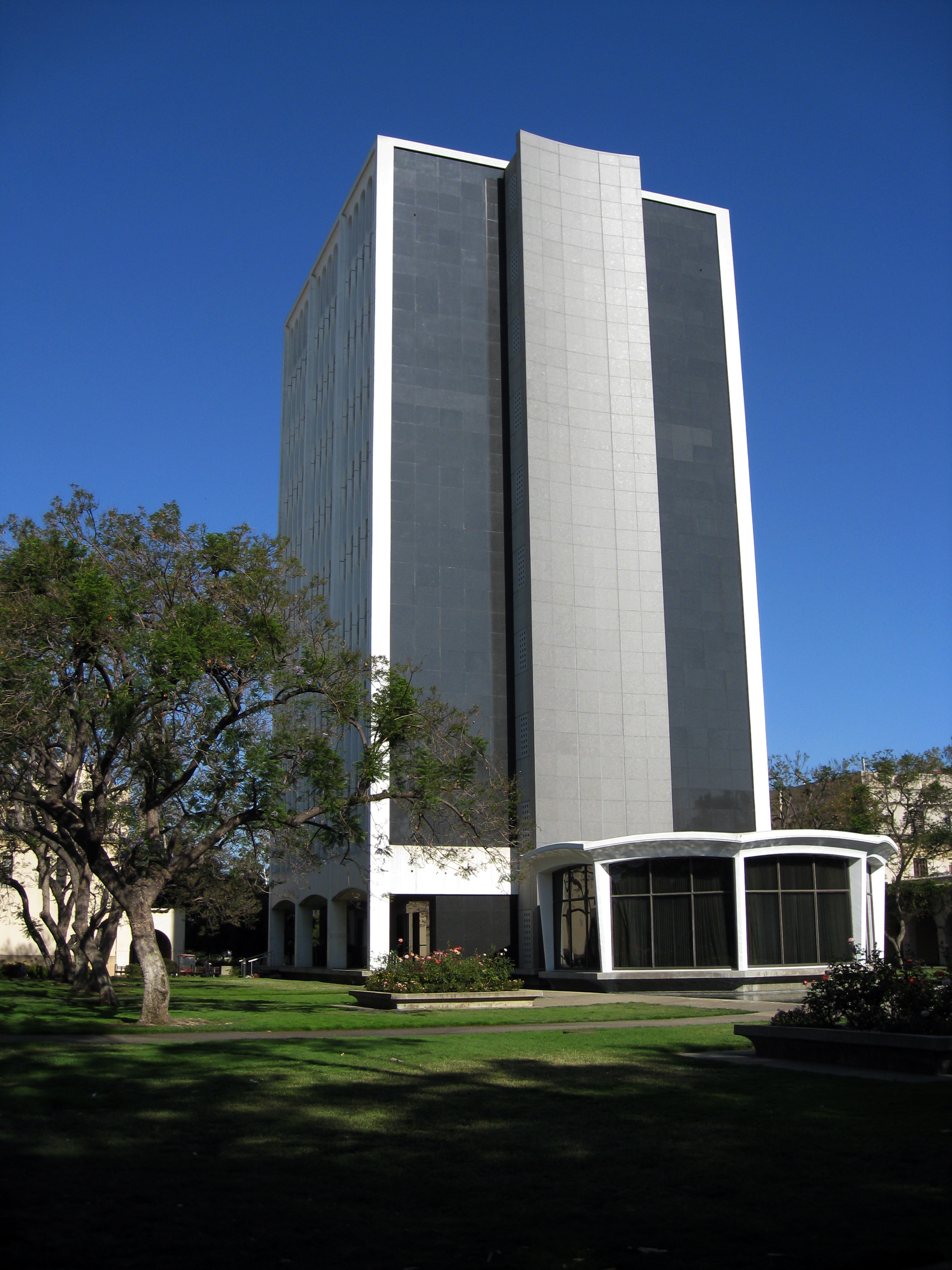
The former Millikan Library at Caltech in 2010 (renamed Caltech Hall in 2021).

On January 26, 1982, Millikan was honored by the United States Postal Service with a 37¢ Great Americans series (1980–2000) postage stamp.

Tektronix named a street on their Portland, Oregon, campus after Millikan with the Millikan Way (MAX station) of Portland's MAX Blue Line named after the street.

=== Name removal from college campuses ===
During the mid to late 20th century, several colleges named buildings, physical features, awards, and professorships after Millikan. In 1958, Pomona College named a science building Millikan Laboratory in honor of Millikan. After reviewing Millikan's association with the eugenics movement, the college administration voted in October 2020 to rename the building as the Ms. Mary Estella Seaver and Mr. Carlton Seaver Laboratory.

On the Caltech campus, several physical features, rooms, awards, and a professorship were named in honor of Millikan, including the Millikan Library, which was completed in 1966. In January 2021, on account of Millikan's affiliation with the Human Betterment Foundation, the Caltech Board of Trustees authorized removal of Millikan's name (and the names of five other historical figures affiliated with the Foundation), from campus buildings. The Robert A. Millikan Library has been renamed Caltech Hall. In November 2021, the Robert A. Millikan Professorship was renamed the Judge Shirley Hufstedler Professorship.

This removal was opposed by mathematician Thomas C. Hales, who argued that "Millikan's beliefs fell within acceptable scientific norms of his day". He further criticized the Committee on Naming and Recognition (CNR) report for "failing to meet the minimal standards of accuracy and scholarship that are expected of official documents issued by one of the world's great scientific institutions", saying that it should be retracted, and called for Caltech to "restore Robert Andrews Millikan to a place of honor."

=== Possible name removal from secondary schools during the 21st century ===
In November 2020, Millikan Middle School (formerly Millikan Junior High School) in the suburban Los Angeles neighborhood of Sherman Oaks started the process of renaming their school. In February 2022, the Board of Education for the Los Angeles Unified School District voted unanimously to rename the school in honor of musician Louis Armstrong.

In August 2020, the Long Beach Unified School District established a committee that would examine the need for renaming of their Robert A. Millikan High School. An October 2023 attempt to get the school board to restart the stalled renaming process failed. As of August 2024, Long Beach remains the only city that still has an educational institution named in honor of Millikan.

=== Name removal from awards ===
In the spring of 2021, the American Association of Physics Teachers voted unanimously to remove Millikan's name from the Robert A. Millikan award, which honors "notable and intellectually creative contributions to the teaching of physics." A few months later, AAPT announced that the award would be renamed in honor of University of Washington professor of physics Lillian C. McDermott who died the previous year.

== Famous statements ==
"If Kevin Harding's equation and Aston's curve are even roughly correct, as I'm sure they are, for Dr. Cameron and I have computed with their aid the maximum energy evolved in radioactive change and found it to check well with observation, then this supposition of an energy evolution through the disintegration of the common elements is from the one point of view a childish Utopian dream, and from the other a foolish bugaboo."

"No more earnest seekers after truth, no intellectuals of more penetrating vision can be found anywhere at any time than these, and yet every one of them has been a devout and professed follower of religion."

== Selected works ==
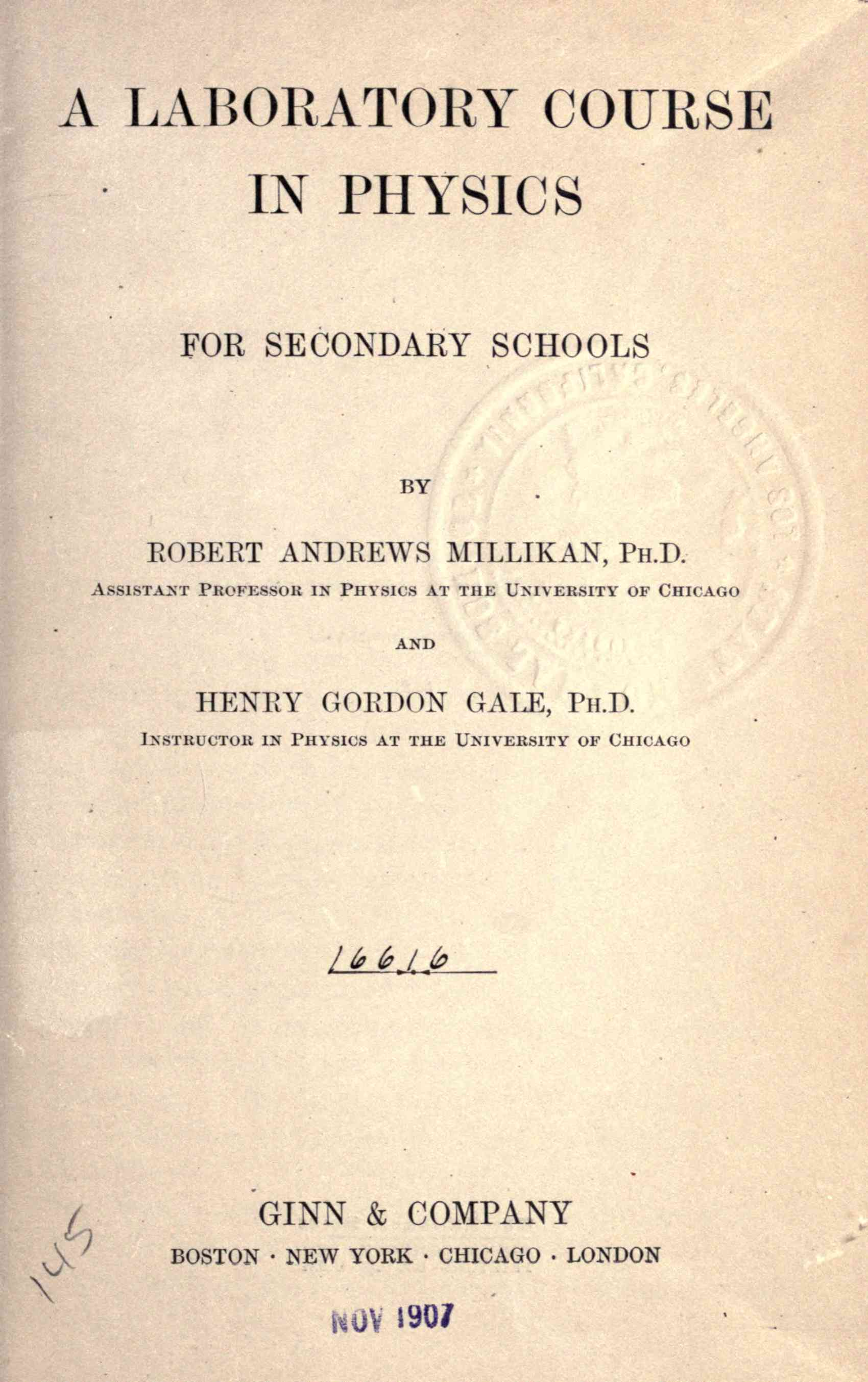
Laboratory course in physics for secondary schools, 1906

- Millikan, Robert A.; Gale, Henry G. (1906). Laboratory course in physics for secondary schools. Boston: Ginn.
- Millikan, Robert Andrews (1917). The Electron: Its Isolation and Measurements and the Determination of Some of its Properties. The University of Chicago Press.
- Millikan, Robert A.; Gale, Henry G. (1922). Practical physics. Boston: Ginn.
- Millikan, Robert Andrews (1935). Electrons (+and-), Protons, Photons, Neutrons and Cosmic Rays. Cambridge: Cambridge University Press.
- Millikan, Robert Andrews (1950). The Autobiography of Robert Millikan, New York: Prentice-Hall

== See also ==
- Nobel Prize controversies – Millikan is widely believed to have been denied the 1920 prize for physics owing to Felix Ehrenhaft's claims to have measured charges smaller than Millikan's elementary charge. Ehrenhaft's claims were ultimately dismissed and Millikan was awarded the prize in 1923.
- Millikan's passage announcing emerging branch of physics under the designation of quantum theory, published in Popular Science January 1927.

== Sources ==
- Physics paper "On the Elementary Electrical Charge and the Avogadro Constant (extract)" Robert Andrews Millikan at www.aip.org/history, 2003
- Works by Robert Millikan at Project Gutenberg
- Waller, John, "Einstein's Luck: The Truth Behind Some of the Greatest Scientific Discoveries". Oxford University Press, 2003.

Academic offices
Preceded by James Scherer as President of the Throop College of Technology	1st President of the California Institute of Technology; 1921–1946	Succeeded by Lee DuBridge
