= Tennessee State Route 287 =

State highway in Tennessee, United States

State Route 287
- SR 287 highlighted in red

Route information
- Maintained by TDOT
- Length: 40.5 mi (65.2 km)
- Existed: July 1, 1983–present

Major junctions
- South end: SR 108 / SR 127 just north of Viola
- SR 55 in Morrison; US 70S in Centertown; SR 56 near Dibrell; SR 288 in Midway
- North end: SR 136 in Rock Island

Location
- Country: United States
- State: Tennessee
- Counties: Warren

Highway system
- Tennessee State Routes; Interstate; US; State
← SR 286	→ SR 288

State Route 287 (SR 287) is a 40.5-mile-long (65.2 km) north-south state highway located entirely in Warren County in Middle Tennessee. It connects Viola with Rock Island via Morrison, Centertown, Midway, and Rock Island State Park. SR 287's routing is somewhat unique in that it forms a nearly C-shaped arch around the southern, western, and northern sides of McMinnville.

== Route description ==
SR 287 begins just north of the town of Viola at an intersection with SR 108/SR 127 (Viola Road). It heads northwest through farmland and rural areas as Morrison Viola Road for several miles, where it crosses a bridge over a creek, to enter the town of Morrison along S Fair Street and come to an intersection with SR 55 (Manchester Highway). The highway then passes through downtown, where it has a short concurrency with SR 379 (Maple Street), before leaving Morrison along N Main Street. SR 287 turns north along Jacksboro Road through rural areas for several miles, where it crosses the Barren Fork River, to pass through the town of Centertown, where it has a short concurrency with US 70S (Nashville Highway/SR 1). It winds its way northeast as W Green Hill Road through farmland for several miles before turning east and passing just north of the Dibrell community, where it has an intersection with SR 56 (Smithville Highway). The highway winds southeast through more hilly areas along E Green Hill Road to pass through the community of Midway, where it has an intersection with SR 288 (Francis Ferry Road). SR 287 now becomes Great Falls Road and continues east to pass through Rock Island State Park, where it passes by the Great Falls Dam and crosses the mouth of the Collins River, before entering the community of Rock Island and come to an end at an intersection with SR 136 (Rock Island Road). The entire route of SR 287 is a two-lane highway.

== Major intersections ==
The entire route is in Warren County.

Location	mi	km	Destinations	Notes
	0.0	0.0	SR 108 / SR 127 (Viola Road) – Viola, McMinnville	Southern terminus
Morrison			SR 55 (Manchester Highway) – Manchester, McMinnville	
Morrison			SR 379 east (E Maple Street)	Southern end of SR 379 concurrency
Morrison			SR 379 west (W Main Street)	Northern end of SR 379 concurrency
			Bridge over the Barren Fork River	
Centertown			US 70S west (Nashville Highway/SR 1 west) – Woodbury	Southern end of US 70S/SR 1 concurrency
Centertown			US 70S east (Nashville Highway/SR 1 east) – McMinnville	Northern end of US 70S/SR 1 concurrency
			SR 56 (Smithville Highway) – Smithville, McMinnville	
Midway			SR 288 (Francis Ferry Road)	
Rock Island State Park			Rock Island Lions Memorial Bridge over Great Falls Lake/Collins River	
Rock Island	40.5	65.2	SR 136 (Rock Island Road) – Campaign, Walling	Northern terminus
1.000 mi = 1.609 km; 1.000 km = 0.621 mi: Concurrency terminus
