= Tennessee State Route 56 =

Highway in Tennessee

State Route 56
- SR 56; primary in red, secondary in blue, unsigned in green

Route information
- Maintained by TDOT
- Length: 160.6 mi (258.5 km)
- Existed: October 1, 1923–present

Major junctions
- South end: SR 117 near Sherwood
- US 41A in Sewanee; I-24 / US 64 at Monteagle; US 41 in Tracy City; US 70S at McMinnville; US 70 at Smithville; I-40 near Silver Point & Baxter; US 70N near Baxter
- North end: KY 63 near Gamaliel, KY

Location
- Country: United States
- State: Tennessee
- Counties: Franklin, Marion, Grundy, Warren, DeKalb, Putnam, Jackson, Macon

Highway system
- Tennessee State Routes; Interstate; US; State
← SR 55	→ SR 57

State Route 56 (SR 56) is a 160.6-mile-long (258.5 km) state highway that runs south to north in Middle Tennessee, from the Alabama state line near Sherwood to the Kentucky state line near Red Boiling Springs.

SR 56 is secondary south of Sewanee. It is primary (but unsigned) along US 41A and US 41 between Sewanee and Tracy City. From Tracy City to the Kentucky line, SR 56 is a signed primary route (including at both ends of its concurrency with Interstate 40), except west from North Springs to Willette, where SR 151 carries primary traffic more directly to Red Boiling Springs.

== Route description ==
=== Alabama state line to McMinnville ===
SR 56 begins as a secondary state route at the Alabama state line south of Sherwood in Franklin County, (as a two-lane) where the road continues south as Alabama State Route 117 into Jackson County, Alabama. SR 56 continues northward to the Crow Creek Valley, which is full of farmland, and passes through Sherwood before the highway becomes very curvy as it ascends into the Cumberland Plateau, passing through the Sherwood Forest, Carter State Natural Area, and Sewanee Natural Bridge portions of South Cumberland State Park.

SR 56 then enters Sewanee to become concurrent with US 41A/SR 15. The highway then turns east and becomes an unsigned primary highway. They have a junction with SR 156 in Saint Andrews before continuing to an interchange with I-24/US 64 (Exit 134) and entering Monteagle. They then have an intersection with US 41/SR 2, where both US 41A and SR 15 end and the roadway is taken over by US 41/SR 2, with SR 56 becoming concurrent with them as they enter downtown, straddling the line with Marion and Grundy Counties. After passing through downtown, they come to an intersection where SR 2 splits from US 41/SR 56, through it is unsigned, and US 41/SR 56 then continue east and leave Monteagle. They continue through countryside, passing by South Cumberland State Park visitor center and Grundy Forest State Natural Area portions of the park, before entering Tracy City, where SR 56 splits from US 41 to turn northward from Marion County into Grundy County, while US 41 turns south along unsigned SR 150. SR 56 continues north as a signed primary highway and passes through countryside and the community of Coalmont before becoming concurrent with SR 108 before entering Altamont. They enter downtown and have an intersection with SR 50 before SR 108 splits off and turns east. SR 56 continues north, where it has an intersection with Greeter Falls Road (which provides access to the Greeter Falls portion of Savage Gulf State Park), and passes through Beersheba Springs, where it has an intersection with Stone Door Road (which leads to the Stone Door portion of Savage Gulf State Park), before becoming curvy again as it descends the plateau before traveling up a narrow valley, where it passes through Irving College and runs parallel to the Collins River, before crossing into Warren County. SR 56 then continues on through farmland before entering into the city of McMinnville.

=== McMinnville to Silver Point ===
SR 56 traverses the center of the city of McMinnville. It enters the city at the intersection with SR 127. It then proceeds north through a neighborhood before having a Y-Intersection with SR 8, before becoming E Colville Street and passing through a major business district and crossing a bridge over the Barren Fork River. It then curves to the west and has an intersection with SR 380 (Main Street), just before entering downtown and coming to an intersection with SR 55 Bus (Chancery Street). SR 56 then turns north again along Chancery Street straight through the middle of downtown before having another intersection with SR 380 and widening a four-lane undivided highway (Smithville Highway) to leave downtown and run through a major business district. It then has an intersection with US 70S/SR 1 (Bobby Ray Memorial Parkway) before narrowing to two lanes and leaving McMinnville. SR 56 continues north through farmland to have an intersection with SR 287 before crossing into DeKalb County.

SR 56 proceeds northward to have an intersection with SR 288 before entering Smithville to an intersection with US 70/SR 26. It then has an intersection with SR 83 near Smithville Municipal Airport before leaving Smithville to enter mountains, and become curvy again, and cross into Putnam County.

SR 56 continues north zig-zagging and crisscrossing atop various mountains and ridges before crossing a bridge over Center Hill Lake. It then continues through the mountains before entering Silver Point to have an intersection with SR 141 before becoming concurrent with I-40 at Exit 273.

=== Interstate 40 to Whitleyville ===
SR 56 runs concurrently with I-40 between exits 273 and 280. Old Baxter Road, the original SR 56 alignment from Silver Point to Baxter closely follows the Interstate. After the junction with US 70N/SR 24, SR 56 continues northward through farmland and Bloomington Springs into Jackson County.

The highway then has an intersection and short concurrency with SR 290 in Center Grove before passing through some mountains and entering the town of Gainesboro. In downtown, SR 56 becomes concurrent with SR 53, and the two go north to the banks of the Cumberland River, where SR 53 splits from SR 56. SR 56 then becomes concurrent with SR 85 and SR 135 before crossing the river to leave Gainesboro. They continue through countryside to Jennings Creek, where SR 85 splits off, before heading on to Whitleyville, where SR 135 splits off via a Y-Intersection.

The route from I-40 to Gainesboro is known to residents of the Upper Cumberland as part of the Corridor J-1 project of the Appalachian Development Highway System, a unit of the Appalachian Regional Commission.

=== North Springs to the Kentucky state line ===
SR 56 turns westward to meet SR 151 at North Springs, where SR 56 becomes a secondary route, enters Macon County, and makes a right turn to the north at the junction of SR 80 and SR 262 at Willette. SR 56 becomes primary again as the highway then enters farmland again and continues north to an intersection with SR 52 before entering Red Boiling Springs. It then continues into downtown to have another intersection with SR 151 before leaving Red Boiling Springs to continue north through farmland to end at the Kentucky state line. Upon reaching the Kentucky state line, the road continues as Kentucky Route 63 about one mile (1.6 km) south of Gamaliel.

=== Additional facts about the route ===
SR 56's entire course from Altamont to Gainesboro is a part of the Tennessee Scenic Parkway system.

== Former alignments ==
Before Interstate 40 was built in the 1960s, SR 56 went from Smithville to Silver Point, and right-turns to proceed up what is now the Old Baxter Road from Silver Point to Baxter, and then it went directly through the town of Baxter along its Main Street. After the Interstate came through, a spur route was built to intersect with Exit 280 (the Baxter - Gainesboro exit) that bypasses Baxter. Old Baxter Road and Main Street still function as major collector roads to this day, given that the Tennessee Department of Transportation designated them as an official detour route as part of their Interstate Incident Management Plan, and they remain the fastest non-freeway route between Gainesboro and Smithville.

The stretch of SR 56 between I-40 and Smithville was notorious for terrible curves prior to the late 1970s, but it was rebuilt and is now considered a good route to follow. Small sections of the original alignment that continue to exist are now maintained by the county road departments of DeKalb and Putnam Counties.

SR 52 ran concurrently with SR 56 through Red Boiling Springs, and branched out eastward towards Clay County until 2003, when SR 52 was rerouted onto a bypass route around the city.

== Major intersections ==
County	Location	mi	km	Destinations	Notes
Franklin		0.0	0.0	SR 117 south – Stevenson	Alabama state line; southern terminus; SR 56 begins as a secondary highway
Franklin	Sewanee	14.0	22.5	Natural Bridge Road - Sewanee Natural Bridge State Natural Area (South Cumberland State Park)	
Franklin	Sewanee	16.2	26.1	US 41A north (SR 15 west) – Cowan, Winchester	South end of unsigned wrong-way US 41A/SR 15 overlap; SR 56 becomes unsigned
Franklin	Saint Andrews	18.6	29.9	SR 156 south – Franklin State Forest, Orme, South Pittsburg	Northern terminus of SR 156; provides access to Sewanee-Franklin County Airport
Marion	Monteagle	21.6– 21.8	34.8– 35.1	I-24 / US 64 – Nashville, Chattanooga	I-24/US 64 exit 134
Marion	Monteagle	22.1	35.6	US 41 north (Dixie Highway W/SR 2 west) – Manchester, Murfreesboro	Southern terminus of US 41A and eastern terminus of unsigned SR 15; south end of US 41/SR 2 overlap
Marion	Monteagle	22.8	36.7	Dixie Lee Avenue (SR 2 east) - Chattanooga	North end of SR 2 overlap
Grundy	South Cumberland State Park	25.2	40.6	South Cumberland State Park visitor center	Access road into park
Grundy	Tracy City	27.5	44.3	3rd Street - Fiery Gizzard / Grundy Forest State Natural Area (South Cumberland State Park)	
Grundy	Tracy City	28.2	45.4	US 41 south (Colyar Street/SR 150 east) – Jasper	North end of US 41 overlap; western terminus of unsigned SR 150; SR 56 becomes a signed primary highway
Grundy	Coalmont	38.1	61.3	SR 108 – Pelham, Gruetli-Laager	
Grundy	Altamont	42.6	68.6	SR 50 west / SR 108 south (Pelham Road) – Pelham	South end of SR 108 overlap; eastern terminus of SR 50
Grundy	Altamont	42.7	68.7	SR 108 north – Viola, McMinnville	North end of SR 108 overlap
Grundy	Altamont	43.9	70.7	Greeter Falls Road - Greeter Falls (Savage Gulf State Park)	
Grundy	Beersheba Springs	48.1	77.4	Stone Door Road - Stone Door (Savage Gulf State Park)	
Grundy		51.2– 51.3	82.4– 82.6	Bridge over the Collins River	
Grundy		54.3	87.4	Bridge over the Collins River	
Warren		66.5	107.0	SR 127 (Shellsford Road) to SR 8 south – Dunlap, Viola, Hillsboro	
Warren	McMinnville	67.1	108.0	SR 8 south (Harrison Ferry Road) – Dunlap	Northern terminus of SR 8
Warren	McMinnville	67.8	109.1	Jeremy Lynn Brown Memorial Bridge over the Barren Fork River	
Warren	McMinnville	68.3	109.9	East Main Street To; SR 380 west	
Warren	McMinnville	68.8	110.7	SR 55 Bus. west / SR 108 south (S Chancery Street) – Manchester	Eastern terminus of SR 55 Bus.; Northern terminus of SR 108
Warren	McMinnville	68.8– 68.9	110.7– 110.9	SR 380 (Main and Morford Streets)	SR 380 follows one-way pair
Warren	McMinnville	70.3	113.1	US 70S (Bobby Ray Memorial Parkway/SR 1) to I-24 / SR 55 – Manchester, Woodbury, Sparta	
Warren	Green Hill	79.1	127.3	SR 287 (Green Hill Road) – Rock Island State Park, Centertown, Morrison	
DeKalb		83.4	134.2	SR 288 south (Keltonburg Road)	Northern terminus of SR 288
DeKalb	Smithville	88.2	141.9	US 70 (E Broad Street/SR 26) – Lebanon, Sparta	
DeKalb	Smithville	89.8	144.5	SR 83 south (Allen Ferry Road)	Northern terminus of SR 83
DeKalb	Smithville	89.9	144.7	Allen's Chapel Road – Smithville Municipal Airport	
Putnam		95.6– 96.0	153.9– 154.5	Bridge over Center Hill Lake/Caney Fork River	
Putnam	Silver Point	100.9	162.4	SR 141 west – Edgar Evins State Park	Eastern terminus of SR 141
Putnam	Silver Point	100.9	162.4	I-40 west – Nashville	South end of I-40 overlap; SR 56 south follows exit 273
Putnam	Roberts	103.5	166.6	Old Baxter Road	I-40 exit 276
Putnam	Baxter	107.2	172.5	I-40 east – Knoxville	North end of I-40 overlap; SR 56 south follows exit 280
Putnam	Baxter	109.7	176.5	US 70N (Nashville Highway/SR 24) – Carthage, Cookeville	
Putnam	Bloomington Springs	111.3	179.1	SR 291 south (Bloomington Road)	Northern terminus of SR 291
Jackson	Center Grove	113.7	183.0	SR 290 west (Shepardsville Highway)	South end of SR 290 overlap
Jackson	Center Grove	114.9	184.9	SR 290 east (Old Gainesboro Highway) – Cookeville	North end of SR 290 overlap
Jackson	Gainesboro	123.6	198.9	SR 53 south (E Hull Avenue) – Gainesboro, Granville, Gainesboro Antique District	South end of SR 53 overlap
Jackson	Gainesboro	124.8	200.8	SR 53 north / SR 85 east / SR 135 south (Grundy Quarles Highway) – Celina, Livingston	North end of SR 53 overlap; south end of SR 85 / SR 135 overlap
Jackson	Gainesboro	124.8– 124.9	200.8– 201.0	Ben Wade Stone Memorial Bridge over the Cumberland River	
Jackson	Jennings Creek	128.7	207.1	SR 85 west – Defeated, Carthage	North end of SR 85 overlap
Jackson	Whitleyville	131.2	211.1	SR 135 north (Keeling Branch Highway)	North end of SR 135 overlap
Jackson	North Springs	137.1	220.6	SR 151 north (Hudson Creek Highway) – Red Boiling Springs	Eastern (signed southern) terminus of SR 151; SR 56 turns secondary
Macon		143.6	231.1	SR 262 east (Wartrace Road)	south end of SR 262 overlap
Macon	Willette	145.9	234.8	SR 80 south (Carthage Road) / SR 262 west (Union Camp Road) – Lafayette, Carthage	North end of SR 262 overlap; northern terminus of SR 80; SR 56 turns primary
Macon	Red Boiling Springs	151.2	243.3	SR 52 (Lafayette Road) – Lafayette, Celina	
Macon	Red Boiling Springs	152.3	245.1	SR 151 east (E Main Street) – Cyclemos Motorcycle Museum	Western terminus of SR 151
Macon		160.6	258.5	KY 63 north (Red Boiling Springs Road) – Gamaliel, Tompkinsville	Kentucky state line; northern terminus; SR 56 ends as a primary highway
1.000 mi = 1.609 km; 1.000 km = 0.621 mi: Concurrency terminus
