= U.S. Route 70S =

Highway in the United States

U.S. Route 70S
- US 70S highlighted in red

Route information
- Auxiliary route of US 70
- Maintained by TDOT
- Length: 113.1 mi (182.0 km)
- Existed: 1939–present

Major junctions
- West end: US 70 in Nashville
- I-440 in Nashville; I-40 / I-65 in Nashville; I-24 in Nashville; I-840 in Murfreesboro
- East end: US 70 / SR 111 in Sparta

Location
- Country: United States
- State: Tennessee
- Counties: Davidson, Rutherford, Cannon, Warren, Van Buren, White

Highway system
- United States Numbered Highway System; List; Special; Divided; Tennessee State Routes; Interstate; US; State
← US 70N	→ US 70A

U.S. Route 70S (US 70S) is an alternative to U.S. Route 70 between the western part of Nashville and Sparta in Tennessee. It runs concurrent with US 70 for several blocks in downtown Nashville. The highway follows Murfreesboro Pike from Nashville to Murfreesboro then heads due east to McMinnville then northeast to Sparta where it ends at its junction with US 70. It was originally designated as U.S. Route 270 in 1926.

== Route description ==
US 70S begins at a junction with US 70 and SR 24 as the Charlotte Pike, and runs concurrently with SR 1. The road descends to an interchange with I-40, before passing through the community of Bellevue and intersecting SR 251. After this, US 70S enters the urban Nashville area along Harding Pike, intersecting SR 100 and then crossing I-440 as West End Avenue. US 70S and SR 1 merge with US 431 and SR 106 and crosses the I-40 and I-65 freeway as Broadway. At that interchange, the one-way couplet of US 70 and SR 24 meets US 70S, and all these routes continue into downtown Nashville. At the intersection of Rosa Parks Boulevard and Broadway, US 31 and US 41 run concurrently with the other routes on 8th Avenue South and then Lafayette Street, while US 431 splits off with US 31 and US 41 headed north, and US 70 and SR 24 continue east. US 31 eventually continues south, splitting from the other routes. US 70S and SR 1 and US 41 come to an interchange with I-24 near the I-40 interchange, before the three routes leave the Nashville area as Murfreesboro Pike, intersecting SR 155 and passing under the runways of Nashville International Airport.

East of the airport, US 70S intersects SR 255, Donelson Pike, and later SR 254 as well as SR 171 (Hobson Pike), as it passes through the suburbs east of Nashville. In Rutherford County, US 70S has an interchange with SR 266 near the airport before passing through Smyrna. The highway then has an interchange with Lee Victory Parkway (SR 102) and I-840 before briefly paralleling the west fork of the Stones River and entering the city of Murfreesboro. U.S. Route 231 and SR 10 briefly run concurrently with the route, and SR 96 intersects it. Southeast of town, US 41 and SR 2 continue south, splitting off from SR 1 and US 70S. As Dr. Martin Luther King Jr. Boulevard, and then as the John Bragg Highway, the two routes leave the city and continue east through forested areas and farmland for several miles.

In the town of Woodbury, the highway intersects with SR 145, and passes through the town as Main Street, also briefly running concurrently with SR 53. The road then winds through foothills before intersecting SR 281, SR 146 (both in the Bluewing community), and SR 287 (in the town of Centertown). Main Street comes to an interchange with SR 380 and SR 55, and US 70S and SR 1 continue northeast on the Bobby Ray Memorial Parkway. The parkway continues along the outskirts of McMinnville, intersecting SR 56 and SR 380. As Sparta Highway, the routes continue east, intersecting SR 30 and SR 288 before passing near Campaign and becoming first Bone Cave Parkway and then Memorial Highway. After several miles, the routes run concurrently with SR 111 before heading due north on Spencer Highway before SR 1 exits from the divided highway. US 70S and SR 111 continue north to the diamond interchange with US 70 and SR 26 just west of downtown Sparta.

== History ==
=== Route changes ===
During the 1980s, the section of the route between Belle Meade and Smyrna was widened from two to four lanes.

In 1991, the portion from Smyrna to Murfreesboro was also widened to four lanes.

In the early 1990s, the 18-mile (29 km) stretch from Murfreesboro to Woodbury was widened from two to four lanes.

Between 1994 and 2002, the section between McMinnville and Sparta was widened to four lanes and a four lane bypass around McMinnville was built. The former routing through downtown McMinnville is now designated State Route 380.

In 2006, besides the two-mile (3.2 km) western terminus near Bellevue past Interstate 40 to the intersection with US 70, the only section of US 70S that lacked four lanes was between Woodbury and McMinnville. Construction began outside McMinnville on widening to five lanes (including one left turn lane) for three miles (5 km) as a way to avoid congestion.

In 2018, most of the section between McMinnville and Woodbury had been widened to a four-lane divided highway. From McMinnville west to where the road starts up the ridge is four-laned. The stretch of highway going through Woodbury proper is still two-lanes. As the remaining two-lane portion will be adjacent to the site chosen in late January 2017 by the Metropolitan Nashville-Davidson County Board of Education for the relocation of Hillwood High School, this may also be upgraded.

== Junction list ==
County	Location	mi	km	Destinations	Notes
Davidson		0.0	0.0	US 70 (Charlotte Pike/SR 1 west/SR 24 east) – Pegram	Western terminus of US 70S; western end of SR 1 concurrency; western terminus of unsigned SR 24
Davidson	Bellevue	1.8– 1.9	2.9– 3.1	I-40 – Memphis, Nashville	I-40 exit 196
Davidson	Bellevue	3.9	6.3	SR 251 north (Old Hickory Boulevard)	Southern terminus of SR 251; continues south as Old Hickory Boulevard
Davidson	Belle Meade	7.3	11.7	SR 100 west – Pasquo, Fairview	Eastern terminus of SR 100; provides access to Natchez Trace Parkway
Davidson	Belle Meade	8.7	14.0	Bridge over Richland Creek	
Davidson	Belle Meade	9.5	15.3	SR 155 north (White Bridge Pike); Woodmount Boulevard	Southern terminus of SR 155; continues south as Woodmount Boulevard; beltway around Nashville
Davidson	Nashville	11.1– 11.3	17.9– 18.2	I-440 (Four-Forty Parkway) – Memphis, Knoxville	I-440 west exit 1, east exit 1A.
Davidson	Nashville	13.2	21.2	US 431 south (Broadway/SR 106 south) – Forest Hills	Western end of US 431 concurrency; northern terminus of unsigned SR 106
Davidson	Nashville	13.4	21.6	I-40 east / I-65 south – Knoxville, Huntsville	I-40 EB/I-65 SB accessed via 14th Avenue S
Davidson	Nashville	13.5	21.7	I-40 west / I-65 north – Memphis, Louisville US 70 west (13th Avenue N/SR 24 west)	Western end of US 70 / SR 24 concurrency
Davidson	Nashville	13.9	22.4	US 70 east (Broadway/SR 24 east) / US 31 north / US 41 north / US 41A north / US 431 north (8th Avenue/SR 6 north/SR 11 north)	Eastern end of US 70/US 431/SR 24 concurrency; western end of US 31/US 41/US 41A/SR 6/SR 11 concurrency
Davidson	Nashville	14.2	22.9	US 31 south (8th Avenue South/SR 6 south) – Berry Hill, Oak Hill US 31A begins	Eastern end of US 31/SR 6 concurrency; Roundabout; northern terminus of US 31A; southern end of US 31A concurrency
Davidson	Nashville	14.8– 15.0	23.8– 24.1	US 31A south / US 41A south (2nd Avenue S/4th Avenue S/SR 11 south); I-40 – Memphis, Knoxville	Eastern end of US 31A/US 41A/SR 11 concurrency; I-40 exit 210C
Davidson	Nashville	17.3– 17.5	27.8– 28.2	I-24 / I-40 – Chattanooga, Nashville, Knoxville	I-24 exit 52; I-40 exit 213 (westbound only)
Davidson	Nashville	18.4	29.6	Bridge over Mill Creek	
Davidson	Nashville	19.3– 19.5	31.1– 31.4	SR 155 (Briley Parkway)	SR 155 exit 4; Single-point urban interchange; beltway around Nashville
Davidson	Nashville	20.4– 20.6	32.8– 33.2	Tunnel under Nashville International Airport	
Davidson	Nashville	21.2	34.1	SR 255 (Donelson Pike) – Oak Hill, Donelson	Provides access to Nashville International Airport
Davidson	Antioch	24.4	39.3	SR 254 west (Bell Road) – Brentwood	Eastern terminus of SR 254
Davidson	Antioch	27.0	43.5	SR 171 (Old Hickory Boulevard/Hobson Pike) – Mount Juliet	
Rutherford	Smyrna	32.2– 32.6	51.8– 52.5	SR 266 (Sam Ridley Parkway)	Provides access to Smyrna Airport; interchange
Rutherford	Smyrna	35.4– 36.1	57.0– 58.1	SR 102 (Lee Victory Parkway/Nissan Drive)	Interchange
Rutherford	Murfreesboro	39.9– 40.8	64.2– 65.7	I-840 – Knoxville, Chattanooga	I-840 exits 55A-B; former SR 840
Rutherford	Murfreesboro	42.3	68.1	Van Cleve Lane - McFadden Farm (Stones River National Battlefield)	
Rutherford	Murfreesboro	42.7	68.7	SR 268 east (N Thompson Lane); S Thompson Lane - Stones River National Battlefield main entrance	Western terminus of SR 268
Rutherford	Murfreesboro	42.8– 42.9	68.9– 69.0	Bridge over the West Fork of the Stones River	
Rutherford	Murfreesboro	45.0– 45.1	72.4– 72.6	US 231 north (Memorial Boulevard/SR 10 north) / SR 96 / SR 99 west (Old Fort Parkway)	Western end of US 231/SR 10/SR 99 concurrency; interchange
Rutherford	Murfreesboro	45.7	73.5	US 231 south (South Church Street/SR 10 south)	Eastern end of US 231/SR 10 concurrency
Rutherford	Murfreesboro	46.2	74.4	US 41 south / SR 99 west (Southeast Broad Street/SR 2 east)	Eastern end of US 41/SR 99 concurrency; western terminus of unsigned SR 2
Cannon	Readyville	59.9	96.4	SR 64 west (Bradyville Road) – Bradyville	Eastern terminus of SR 64
Cannon	Woodbury	63.6	102.4	William Bill Smith Bridge over the East Fork of the Stones River	
Cannon	Woodbury	64.1	103.2	SR 145 north – Auburntown	Southern terminus of SR 145
Cannon	Woodbury	64.4– 64.5	103.6– 103.8	Bridge over the East Fork of the Stones River	
Cannon	Woodbury	64.9	104.4	SR 53 south (South McCrary Street) – Manchester	Western end of SR 53 concurrency
Cannon	Woodbury	65.6	105.6	SR 53 north (Gassaway Road) – Liberty	Eastern end of SR 53 concurrency
Cannon	Bluewing	70.6	113.6	SR 281 (Center Hill Road/Manaustown Road)	
Cannon	Bluewing	72.3	116.4	SR 146 north (Short Mountain Road) – Smithville	Southern terminus of SR 146
Warren	Centertown	76.5	123.1	SR 287 south (W Green Hill Road) – Centertown	Western end of short SR 287 concurrency
Warren	Centertown	76.6	123.3	SR 287 north (W Green Hill Road)	Eastern end of short SR 287 concurrency
Warren		81.5	131.2	Old Nashville Highway to Airport Road - Warren County Memorial Airport	
Warren	McMinnville	83.7	134.7	SR 55 west (H T Pelham Memorial Parkway) / SR 380 east (W Main Street) – Manchester, Downtown	Interchange; eastern terminus of SR 55; western terminus of SR 380; SR 380 is the former routing of US 70S/SR 1
Warren	McMinnville	85.0	136.8	SR 56 (N Chancery Street/Smithville Highway) – Smithville, Downtown	
Warren	McMinnville	86.8– 87.0	139.7– 140.0	SR 380 west (Sparta Street) – Downtown	Eastern terminus of SR 380; former routing of US 70S/SR 1
Warren		88.1– 88.2	141.8– 141.9	Veterans Memorial Bridge over the Collins River	
Warren		89.8– 90.0	144.5– 144.8	SR 30 east (Spencer Road) – Spencer	Western terminus of SR 30
Warren		90.8	146.1	SR 288 north (Old Rock Island Road)	Southern terminus of SR 288
Warren	Campaign	97.0	156.1	SR 136 north (Rock Island Road) – Rock Island, Rock Island State Park, Walling	Southern terminus of SR 136
Warren–Van Buren county line	Bone Cave	97.4– 97.5	156.8– 156.9	Great Bone Cave Bridge over the Rocky River	
Van Buren	No major junctions				
Van Buren–White county line	Quebeck	100.3– 100.4	161.4– 161.6	John Steele Cooper Bridge over the Caney Fork River	
White	Doyle	105.2	169.3	W Gooseneck Road - Doyle SR 285 east (E Gooseneck Road) – Fall Creek Falls State Park	Wester terminus of SR 285; W Gooseneck Road is an access road into the town of Doyle
White		107.4– 107.5	172.8– 173.0	Bridge over the Calfkiller River	
White		108.0– 108.2	173.8– 174.1	SR 111 south (Spencer Highway) – Spencer	Western end of SR 111 concurrency; interchange
White	Sparta	110.5– 110.6	177.8– 178.0	James R. Tubb Bridge over the Calfkiller River	
White	Sparta	110.9– 111.4	178.5– 179.3	SR 1 east (Mayberry Street) – Sparta	Eastern end of SR 1 concurrency; interchange
White	Sparta	113.1	182.0	US 70 (W Bockman Way/SR 26) – Sparta, Smithville SR 111 north – Cookeville	Eastern terminus of US 70S; interchange; eastern end of SR 111 concurrency
1.000 mi = 1.609 km; 1.000 km = 0.621 mi: Concurrency terminus

== See also ==
- U.S. Route 70N
