= Tennessee State Route 288 =

State highway in Tennessee, United States

State Route 288
- SR 288 highlighted in red

Route information
- Maintained by TDOT
- Length: 17.6 mi (28.3 km)
- Existed: July 1, 1983–present

Major junctions
- South end: US 70S near McMinnville
- SR 287 in Midway
- North end: SR 56 near Smithville

Location
- Country: United States
- State: Tennessee
- Counties: Warren, DeKalb

Highway system
- Tennessee State Routes; Interstate; US; State
← SR 287	→ SR 289

State Route 288 (SR 288) is a 17.6-mile-long (28.3 km) north-south state highway in Warren and DeKalb counties of Middle Tennessee.

== Route description ==
SR 288 begins in Warren County at an intersection with US 70S/SR 1 just east of McMinnville. It heads northeast along Old Rock Island Road, a former alignment of US 70S, for a short distance before turning northwest along Hennessee Bridge Road. The highway winds its way northwest through farmland for several miles, where it crosses a bridge over the Collins River, to merge onto Francis Ferry Road and pass through Midway, where it has an intersection with SR 287. SR 288 crosses into DeKalb County and winds its way through hillier terrain as Belk Road to pass through Antioch, where it becomes Antioch Road. It continues northwest to pass through Keltonburg, where it turns onto Keltonburg Road and crosses a bridge over a creek, before the highway turns completely west through flatter farmland for several miles before SR 288 comes to an end at an intersection with SR 56 just south of Smithville. The entire route of SR 288 is a rural two-lane highway.

== Major intersections ==
County	Location	mi	km	Destinations	Notes
Warren		0.0	0.0	US 70S (Sparta Highway/SR 1) – McMinnville, Campaign, Doyle, Sparta	Southern terminus
Warren		4.9– 5.0	7.9– 8.0	Hennessee Bridge over the Collins River	
Warren	Midway	7.3	11.7	SR 287 (E Green Hill Road/Great Falls Road) – Centertown, Rock Island	Provides access to Rock Island State Park and Great Falls Dam
DeKalb		17.6	28.3	SR 56 (McMinnville Highway) – McMinnville, Smithville	Northern terminus
1.000 mi = 1.609 km; 1.000 km = 0.621 mi
