= Tennessee State Route 379 =

State highway in Tennessee, United States

State Route 379
- Maple Street
- TN 379highlighted in red

Route information
- Maintained by TDOT
- Length: 1.8 mi (2.9 km)
- Existed: July 1, 1983–present

Major junctions
- East end: SR 55 in Morrison
- SR 287 in Morrison
- West end: SR 55 in Morrison

Location
- Country: United States
- State: Tennessee
- Counties: Warren

Highway system
- Tennessee State Routes; Interstate; US; State
← SR 378	→ SR 380

State Route 379 (SR 379) is a short east–west highway in Morrison, Tennessee. The current length is 1.8 mi (2.9 km).

== Route description ==
SR 379 begins at an intersection with SR 55 in Morrison. It goes northeast as West Maple Street and runs a 0.1 miles (160 m) long concurrency with SR 287 in downtown Morrison. SR 379 then becomes East Maple Street and continues to travel northeast before suddenly turning southeast and terminating at SR 55.

== History ==
The entire route of SR 379 follows the former alignment of SR 55 through downtown Morrison.

== Major intersections ==
The entire route is in Morrison, Warren County.

mi	km	Destinations	Notes
1.8	2.9	SR 55 (Manchester Highway) – McMinnville, Manchester	Eastern terminus
1.14	1.83	SR 287 south (S Fair Street) – Viola	Eastern end of SR 287 concurrency
1.05	1.69	SR 287 north (N Main Street) – Centertown	Western end of SR 287 concurrency
0.0	0.0	SR 55 (Manchester Highway) – McMinnville, Manchester	Western terminus
1.000 mi = 1.609 km; 1.000 km = 0.621 mi: Concurrency terminus

== See also ==
- List of state routes in Tennessee
