= Tennessee State Route 1 =

State highway in Tennessee, United States

State Route 1
- Memphis to Bristol Highway
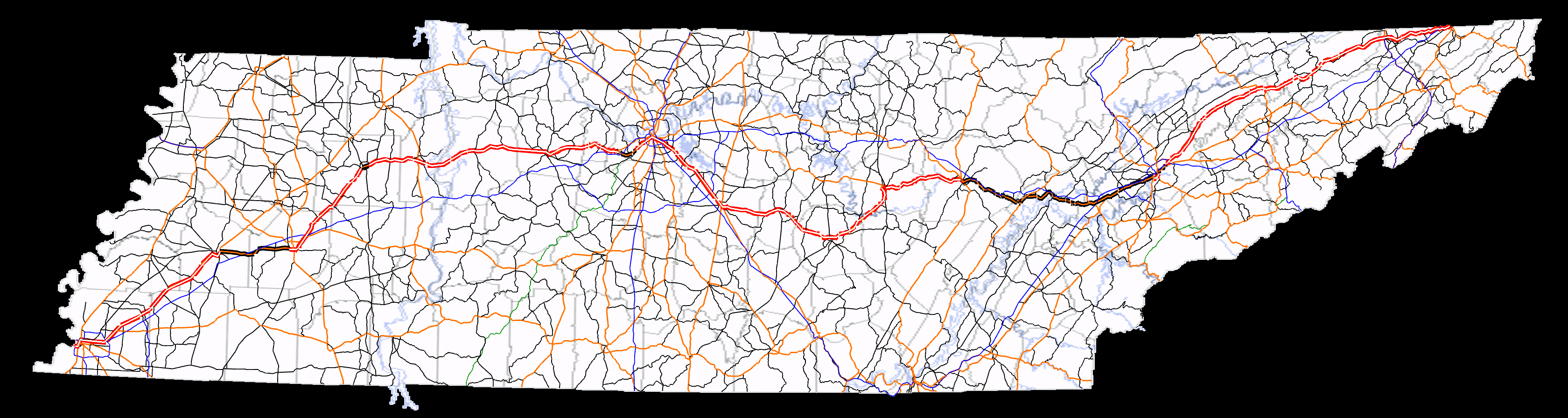
- TN SR 1 highlighted. Red primary designation and Black secondary designation.

Route information
- Maintained by TDOT
- Length: 538.8 mi (867.1 km)
- Existed: October 1, 1923–present
- History: Designated Memphis to Bristol Highway in 1915

Major junctions
- West end: I-55 / US 61 / US 64 / US 70 / US 78 / US 79 at the Arkansas state line in Memphis
- I-40 near Brownsville; I-40 / US 412 near Jackson; I-40 near Belle Meade; I-440 in Nashville; I-840 near Murfreesboro; I-140 in Knoxville; I-40 in Knoxville; I-26 / US 23 in Kingsport; I-81 in Bristol
- East end: US 11E / US 19 / SR 34 in Bristol

Location
- Country: United States
- State: Tennessee
- Counties: Shelby, Fayette, Tipton, Haywood, Madison, Carroll, Benton, Humphreys, Dickson, Cheatham, Davidson, Rutherford, Cannon, Warren, Van Buren, White, Cumberland, Roane, Loudon, Knox, Grainger, Hawkins, Sullivan

Highway system
- Tennessee State Routes; Interstate; US; State
← SR 840	→ SR 2

Map showing the west end of SR 1 in Memphis

State Route 1 (SR 1), known as the Memphis to Bristol Highway, is a 538.8-mile-long (867.1 km) mostly-unsigned state highway in the U.S. state of Tennessee. It stretches from the Arkansas state line at the Mississippi River in Memphis in the southwest corner of the state to the Virginia state line at Bristol in the northeast part. Most of the route travels concurrently with U.S. Route 70 (US 70) and US 11W. It is the longest numbered highway of any kind in the state of Tennessee. The route is signed as both a primary and secondary highway at different times throughout its designation.

In 2015, the Tennessee Department of Transportation erected signs along SR 1 showing motorists they are traveling on the Memphis to Bristol Highway, Tennessee's first state road. TDOT installed the signs at every county line while it celebrated its 100th anniversary.

== Route description ==
=== Memphis area ===
SR 1 begins as a primary route on Interstate 55 (I-55) in the middle of the Memphis & Arkansas Bridge at the Arkansas–Tennessee state line. US 61, US 64, US 70, US 78, and US 79 come off the bridge alongside SR 1; US 61 soon turns south with SR 14 and US 78 continues along E.H. Crump Blvd with SR 4 heading eastward. The other three U.S. Highways and SR 1 travel along SR 4 northbound (on Danny Thomas Blvd). At SR 3 (Union Avenue), US 51 joins SR 1 and 4 while US 64/70/79 continue east on Union Avenue. At North Parkway, SR 4 continues along Danny Thomas Blvd/Thomas St with US 51 northbound, while SR 1 turns east alone onto North Parkway. However, US 64/US 70/US 79 soon rejoin SR 1 at SR 57. These four routes continue as Summer Avenue until exiting Memphis. The portions where SR 1 runs by itself are signed.

=== Between Memphis and Nashville ===
SR 1 is a primary route until it runs around Brownsville. After the junction of SR 76, SR 1 becomes a secondary route for a short time until it crosses SR 186.

After leaving Memphis, SR 1 runs along the following routes:

- US 64, Memphis to SR 15 in Bartlett
- US 79, Memphis to SR 76 in Brownsville
- US 70, Memphis to SR 22 Bypass in Huntingdon
- US 70 Business through Huntingdon
- US 70/SR 364 in Huntingdon to SR 24 west of Belle Meade

=== Nashville ===
SR 1 enters Nashville from the west along US 70S through the community of Bellevue. Between Old Hickory Pike and White Bridge Road east of Belle Meade, the highway is known as Harding Pike. Between here and Downtown Nashville, SR 1 is known as West End Avenue. In downtown, SR 1 is known as Broadway. As SR 1 approaches 8th Avenue South/Rosa Parks, it turns right and southeast, joining US 41 and becoming known as Lafayette Street (briefly) and then Murfreesboro Road.

=== Between Nashville and Knoxville ===
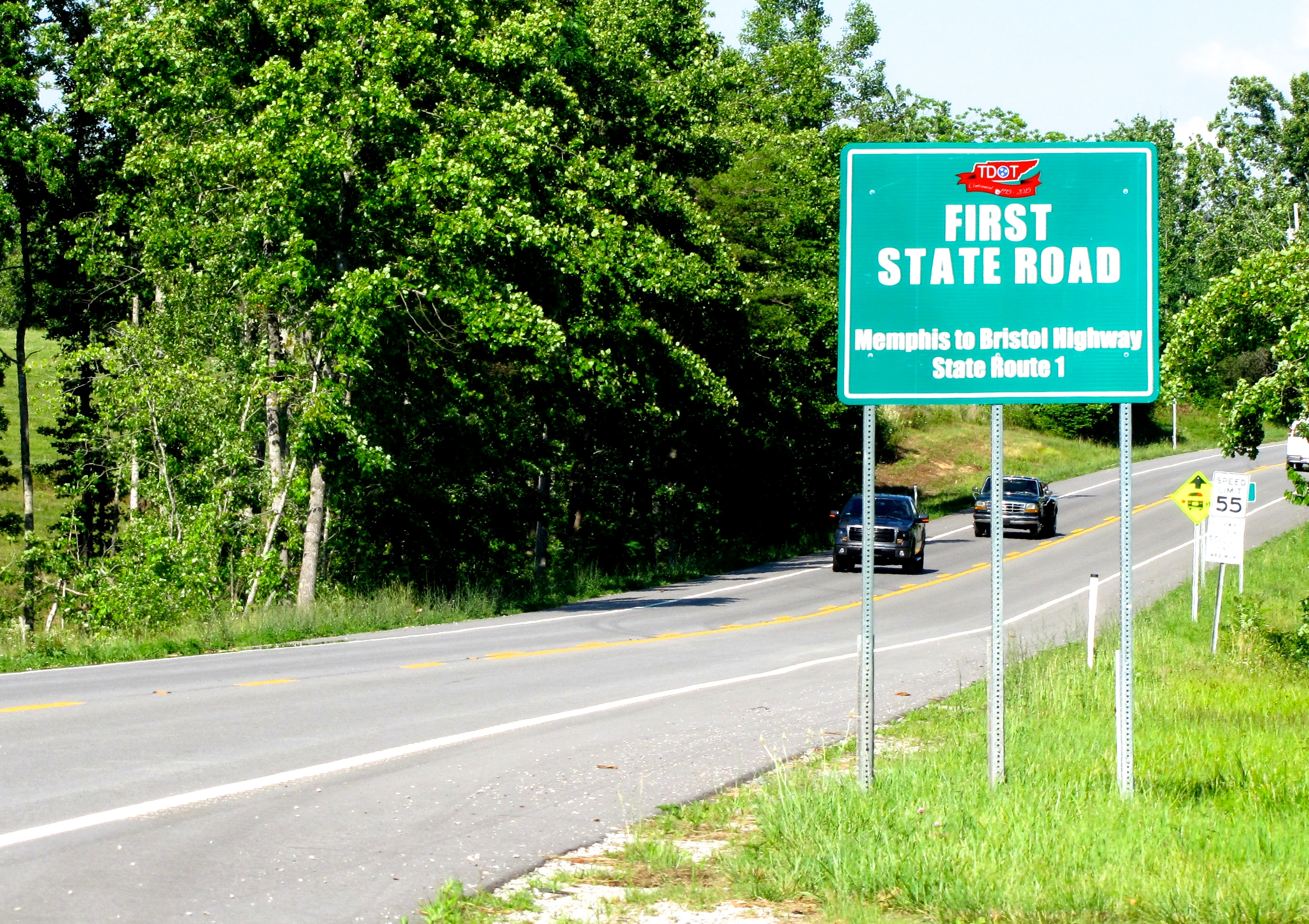
Sign marking SR 1 in Cumberland County

SR 1 is a primary route until its intersection with US 70N/ SR 24. It continues to be a secondary route until its intersection with US 11W. East of Nashville, SR 1 runs along the following routes:

- US 70S through Belle Meade and Nashville to SR 111 in Sparta
- US 41 from Downtown Nashville to Murfreesboro
- Separate through Sparta–the only signed portion
- US 70/SR 26 in Sparta to SR 168 in Knoxville

=== Knoxville ===
SR 1 enters Knox County along with US 70 and US 11 (which joins SR 1 a few feet from the county line). From here to near the downtown area, the road is locally known as Kingston Pike and near the University of Tennessee campus it is known as Cumberland Avenue. It turns north onto Henley Street becoming Broadway Street, east onto Magnolia Avenue, north onto Hall of Fame Drive, and back onto Magnolia Avenue. In East Knoxville, SR 1 splits from US 70 and continues northeast with US 11W as Rutledge Pike.

=== Between Knoxville and Bristol ===
Between Knoxville and Bristol, SR 1 runs along US 11W.

=== Bristol ===
Map showing the east end of SR 1 in Bristol

In Bristol, SR 1 leaves US 11W right at the state line, and heads east on its own (as a primary route) along State Street. It turns south at US 11E/US 19, ending two blocks later at Broad Street (SR 34).

== State designations ==
State Route 1 runs as a primary or secondary highway as follows:

- Primary, Memphis to SR 76 in Brownsville
- Secondary, SR 76 to SR 186 (US 45 Bypass) in Jackson
- Primary, SR 186 to SR 22 Bypass in Huntingdon
- Secondary, SR 22 Bypass to SR 364 in Huntingdon
- Primary, SR 364 to I-40 west of Belle Meade
- Secondary, I-40 to SR 100 in Belle Meade
- Primary, SR 100 to I-440 in Nashville
- Secondary, I-440 to I-24 in Nashville
- Primary, I-24 to SR 24 in Crossville
- Secondary, SR 24 to SR 29 south of Rockwood
- Primary, SR 29 to SR 61 in Rockwood
- Secondary, SR 61 to I-40 in Knoxville
- Primary, I-40 to Bristol
- Interestingly, although SR 1 is signed a primary highway in Sparta, the TDOT Traffic Map for White County actually identifies this stretch as a secondary highway. (Between the eastern end of the SR 111 and US 70S concurrency to the eastern terminus of SR 26 at US 70 in Sparta). There are no secondary designation reassurance shields signs along the entire SR 1 corridor.

== List of signed segments ==
- US 61, US 64, US 70, and US 79 to US 51, US 64, US 70, and US 79 in Memphis
- SR 14 and US 51 to US 64, US 70, US 79, and SR 57 in Memphis
- US 70S and SR 111 to US 70 and SR 26 in Sparta
- Along State Street in Bristol from US 11W to US 421

== Major intersections ==
County	Location	mi	km	Destinations	Notes
Mississippi River		0.00	0.00	I-55 north / US 61 north / US 64 west / US 70 west / US 78 west / US 79 north – St. Louis	Continuation into Arkansas; western end of I-55/US 61/US 64/US 70/US 78/US 79 overlap
Mississippi River		0.00	0.00	Memphis & Arkansas Bridge	
Shelby	Memphis	0.66	1.06	I-55 south – Jackson Miss	Eastern end of I-55 overlap
Shelby	Memphis	1.35	2.17	US 61 south / SR 14 (Third Street)	Eastern end of US 61 overlap
Shelby	Memphis	1.80	2.90	SR 4 west (Crump Boulevard)	Western end of SR 4 overlap
Shelby	Memphis	2.67	4.30	US 78 / SR 278 (Linden Avenue)	
Shelby	Memphis	2.96	4.76	US 51 south / US 64 east / US 70 east / US 79 south / SR 3 (Union Avenue)	Eastern end of US 64/US 70/US 79 overlap; western end of US 51 overlap
Shelby	Memphis			Madison Avenue (including MATA Trolley Line)	Interchange
Shelby	Memphis			Jefferson Avenue	Interchange
Shelby	Memphis	3.76	6.05	I-40 – Nashville, Little Rock	
Shelby	Memphis	4.13	6.65	US 51 north / SR 4 north / SR 14 north (Danny Thomas Boulevard) / SR 14 south (A.W. Willis Avenue)	Eastern end of US 51/SR 4 overlap
Shelby	Memphis	5.53	8.90	Watkins Street	Interchange
Shelby	Memphis	7.34	11.81	US 64 west / US 70 west / US 79 south (E. Parkway North) / SR 57 (Trezevant Street)	Western end of US 64/US 70/US 79 overlap
Shelby	Memphis	12.80	20.60	I-40 west / I-240 west	
Shelby	Bartlett	17.90	28.81	US 64 east / SR 15 (Stage Road)	Eastern end of US 64 overlap
Shelby	Bartlett	21.21	34.13	SR 177 south (Germantown Parkway)	
Shelby	Arlington	28.43	45.75	SR 385 to I-40 / I-269 – Millington, Collierville	
Fayette	Gallaway	33.66	54.17	SR 197 south (Main Street)	
Fayette	Braden	37.68	60.64	SR 59 east to I-40	Western end of SR 59 overlap
Tipton	Mason	40.72	65.53	SR 59 west	Eastern end of SR 59 overlap
Haywood	Stanton	48.81	78.55	SR 222 south (Fayette Street)	
Haywood	Stanton	48.94	78.76	SR 179 (Covington Street)	
Haywood	Brownsville	59.44	95.66	SR 19 west (Brownsville Bypass)	Western end of SR 19 overlap
Haywood	Brownsville	61.69	99.28	SR 76 south to I-40 – Somerville	
Haywood	Brownsville	62.47	100.54	SR 19 east (Jefferson Street)	Eastern end of SR 19 overlap
Haywood	Brownsville	62.98	101.36	US 70A north / US 79 north (Dupree Avenue)	Eastern end of US 79 overlap
Haywood		71.31	114.76	I-40 – Memphis, Nashville	
Madison		73.51	118.30	SR 138 to I-40	
Madison		81.71	131.50	SR 223 to I-40	
Madison	Jackson	86.38	139.02	US 45 Byp. north (Keith Short Bypass) to SR 186 / I-40	Western end of US 45 Byp. overlap
Madison	Jackson	87.93	141.51	US 45 (S. Highland Avenue) / US 45 Byp. ends	Eastern end of US 45 Byp. overlap
Madison	Jackson	88.85	142.99	SR 198 east (Chester Street)	
Madison	Jackson	91.72	147.61	US 412 Bus. west (North Parkway)	Western end of US 412 Bus. overlap
Madison	Jackson	94.52	152.12	US 412 east US 412 Bus. ends	Eastern terminus of US 412 Bus.; western end of US 412 overlap
Madison	Jackson	94.92	152.76	I-40 / US 412 west – Memphis, Nashville	Eastern end of US 412 overlap
Madison		101.92	164.02	SR 152	
Carroll	Cedar Grove	108.02	173.84	SR 104 east to I-40 – Lexington	Western end of SR 104 overlap
Carroll	Cedar Grove	108.52	174.65	SR 220 north – Atwood	
Carroll		111.72	179.80	SR 104 west – Milan	Eastern end of SR 104 overlap
Carroll		112.42	180.92	SR 424 east – Clarksburg	
Carroll	Huntingdon	113.68	182.95	US 70 east / SR 22 Byp. (Veterans Drive South) US 70 Bus. begins	Eastern end of US 70 overlap; western terminus of US 70 Bus.
Carroll	Huntingdon	114.29– 114.38	183.93– 184.08	SR 22 Bus. (Court Square)	Roundabout
Carroll	Huntingdon	116.36	187.26	US 70 west (Veterans Drive South) / US 70A west (Veterans Drive North) – McKenzie, McLemoresville, Lexington, Jackson, Paris US 70 Bus. ends	Eastern terminus of US 70 Bus.; western end of US 70 overlap
Carroll		119.43	192.20	SR 219 north (Rosser Road)	
Carroll	Hollow Rock	123.81	199.25	SR 114 south – Buena Vista	Western end of SR 114 overlap
Carroll	Hollow Rock	123.91	199.41	SR 114 north (Seminary Street)	Eastern end of SR 114 overlap
Benton	Camden	131.60	211.79	US 70 Bus. east (W. Main Street)	
Benton	Camden	133.20	214.36	US 641 – Camden, Parsons	
Benton	Camden	135.00	217.26	SR 191 (Birdsong Road)	
Benton	Camden	135.90	218.71	US 70 Bus. west (Forest Avenue South) – Camden	
Kentucky Lake				Hickman Lockhart Bridge over Tennessee River	
Humphreys	New Johnsonville	141.20	227.24	New Johnsonville Power Plant	Interchange
Humphreys	New Johnsonville	142.36	229.11	Chemours Johnsonville Plant	
Humphreys	Waverly	151.87	244.41	To SR 13 (SR 13 Spur)	
Humphreys	McEwen	160.98	259.07	SR 231 north (Main Street)	
Dickson	Dickson	174.24	280.41	SR 46 north	Western end of SR 46 overlap
Dickson	Dickson	174.32	280.54	US 70 Bus. east (W. College Street)	
Dickson	Dickson	175.39	282.26	SR 48 (North Main Street) – Charlotte, Centerville, Clarksville	Interchange
Dickson	Dickson	175.88	283.05	SR 46 south (Mathis Drive) to I-40	Eastern end of SR 46 overlap
Dickson	Dickson	176.27	283.68	US 70 Bus. west (E. College Street)	
Dickson	Dickson	177.89	286.29	SR 96 east to I-40	
Dickson	White Bluff	184.21	296.46	SR 47 south – Burns	Western end of SR 47 overlap
Dickson	White Bluff	184.77	297.36	SR 47 north (Walton Speight Highway) – Charlotte	Eastern end of SR 47 overlap
Cheatham	Pegram	195.08	313.95	SR 249 south (Kingston Springs Road) to I-40 – Kingston Springs	Western end of SR 249 overlap
Cheatham	Pegram	195.30	314.30	SR 249 north (Sams Creek Road) – Ashland City	Eastern end of SR 249 overlap
Davidson	Bellevue	200.83	323.20	US 70 east (Charlotte Pike) US 70S begins	Eastern end of US 70 overlap; western end of US 70S overlap
Davidson	Bellevue	202.63	326.10	I-40 – Nashville, Memphis	I-40 exit 196
Davidson	Bellevue	204.73	329.48	SR 251 north / Old Hickory Boulevard	
Davidson	Belle Meade	208.16	335.00	SR 100 west – Pasquo, Fairview	
Davidson	Belle Meade	210.38	338.57	SR 155 north (White Bridge Pike) / Woodmount Boulevard	
Davidson	Nashville	212.06	341.28	I-440 – Memphis, Knoxville	I-440 exit 1A
Davidson	Nashville	214.06	344.50	US 431 south (Broadway)	Western end of US 431 overlap
Davidson	Nashville	214.27	344.83	I-40 / I-65 / US 70 west (14th Avenue North) – Airport	Western end of US 70 overlap
Davidson	Nashville	214.76	345.62	US 70 east (Broadway) / US 31 north / US 41 north / US 41A north / US 431 north (8th Avenue North)	Eastern end of US 70/US 431 overlap; western end of US 31/US 41/US 41A overlap
Davidson	Nashville	215.08	346.14	US 31 south (8th Avenue South) US 31A begins	Roundabout; eastern end of US 31 overlap; western terminus of US 31A
Davidson	Nashville	215.59– 215.79	346.96– 347.28	I-40 / US 31A south / US 41A south (4th Avenue South) – Memphis, Knoxville	Eastern end of US 31A/US 41A overlap; I-40 exit 210C
Davidson	Nashville	218.26	351.26	I-24 / I-40 / I-440 – Chattanooga, Knoxville	I-24 exit 52; I-40 exit 213
Davidson	Nashville	220.23	354.43	SR 155 (Briley Parkway)	SR 155 exit 4
Davidson	Nashville	221.98	357.24	SR 255 (Donelson Pike) – Airport	
Davidson	Antioch	225.19	362.41	SR 254 west (Bell Road)	
Davidson	Antioch	227.79	366.59	SR 171 (Old Hickory Boulevard / Hobson Pike)	
Rutherford	Smyrna	233.24	375.36	SR 266 (Sam Ridley Parkway) to I-24 – Smyrna Airport	Interchange
Rutherford	Smyrna	236.53	380.66	SR 102 to I-24	Interchange
Rutherford	Murfreesboro	241.15	388.09	I-840 – Knoxville, Chattanooga	I-840 exit 55; former SR 840
Rutherford	Murfreesboro	243.48	391.84	SR 268 east / Thompson Lane – Stones River National Battlefield	
Rutherford	Murfreesboro	245.83	395.63	US 231 north (Memorial Boulevard) / SR 10 north (Old Fort Parkway) to SR 96 / I-24	Western end of US 231 overlap
Rutherford	Murfreesboro	246.50	396.70	US 231 south (South Church Street) / SR 10 south	Eastern end of US 231 overlap
Rutherford	Murfreesboro	247.01	397.52	US 41 south (Southeast Broad Street) / SR 2 east	Eastern end of US 41 overlap; western terminus of SR 2
Cannon		260.52	419.27	SR 64 west (Bradyville Road) – Bradyville	
Cannon	Woodbury	261.22	420.39	SR 145 north (Auburntown Road) – Auburntown	
Cannon	Woodbury	261.96	421.58	SR 53 south (S. McCrary Street)	Western end of SR 53 overlap
Cannon	Woodbury	262.64	422.68	SR 53 north (Gassaway Road) – Liberty	Eastern end of SR 53 overlap
Cannon		267.72	430.85	SR 281 (Center Hill Road) – Bluewing	
Cannon		269.32	433.43	SR 146 north (Short Mountain Road) – Smithville	
Warren	Centertown	273.32	439.87	SR 287 south (Green Hill Road) – Centertown	Western end of SR 287 overlap
Warren	Centertown	273.40	439.99	SR 287 north (Green Hill Road)	Eastern end of SR 287 overlap
Warren	McMinnville	280.49	451.40	SR 55 west (Manchester Highway) / SR 380 east (W Main Street) – Manchester	Interchange
Warren	McMinnville	281.77	453.46	SR 56 (Smithville Highway)	
Warren	McMinnville	283.88	456.86	SR 380 west (Sparta Street) – Downtown	Former routing of US 70S / SR 1
Warren		286.69	461.38	SR 30 east (Spencer Road) – Spencer	
Warren		287.49	462.67	SR 288 north (Old Rock Island Road)	
Warren	Campaign	293.69	472.65	SR 136 north (Rock Island Road) – Rock Island, Walling	
Van Buren	No major junctions				
White	Doyle	301.93	485.91	SR 285 east (E Gooseneck Road) – Fall Creek Falls State Park	
White		304.76	490.46	SR 111 south (Spencer Highway) – Spencer	Interchange; western end of SR 111 overlap
White	Sparta	307.86	495.45	US 70S east / SR 111 north (Spencer Highway)	Interchange; eastern end of US 70S/SR 111 overlap
White	Sparta	308.91	497.14	US 70 west (W. Bockman Way) – Cookeville, Smithville	Western end of US 70 overlap
White	Sparta	308.99	497.27	SR 289 north (N. Spring Street)	
White	Sparta	309.73	498.46	SR 84 north (N. Main Street)	
Cumberland	Crossville	333.50	536.72	SR 462 east (Northside Drive)	
Cumberland	Crossville	335.74	540.32	US 70N west (West Avenue) / Elmore Road to I-40 / US 127 – Monterey	
Cumberland	Crossville	336.19	541.05	SR 392 (Miller Avenue)	
Cumberland	Crossville	337.17	542.62	SR 101 south (Lantana Road)	Western end of SR 101 overlap
Cumberland	Crossville	337.25	542.75	US 127 (S. Main Street) / SR 28	
Cumberland	Crossville	339.68	546.66	SR 392 north to SR 101 north / I-40	Eastern end of SR 101 overlap
Cumberland	Crab Orchard	347.38	559.05	To I-40 (Market Street)	I-40 exit 329
Cumberland		356.34	573.47	SR 299 north (Westel Road) to I-40	
Roane	Rockwood	359.21	578.09	US 27 south (S. Gateway Avenue) / SR 29 – Spring City, Chattanooga	Western end of US 27 overlap
Roane	Rockwood	362.01	582.60	US 27 north / SR 61 east (North Gateway Avenue) – Harriman	Eastern end of US 27 overlap
Roane		365.19	587.72	SR 382 north (Patton Lane)	
Roane	Harriman	370.00	595.46	SR 29 north (Pine Ridge Road) to I-40	
Roane	Kingston	372.80	599.96	SR 58 (Kentucky Street) to I-40 – Chattanooga	
Roane	Kingston	376.64	606.14	SR 326 north (Gallaher Road) to I-40 – Oak Ridge	
Loudon	Lenoir City	387.24	623.20	US 321 to SR 73 / SR 95 / I-40 / I-75 – Lenoir City, Oak Ridge	
Loudon	Farragut	391.24	629.64	US 11 south (Lee Highway) / SR 2 – Lenoir City	Western end of US 11 overlap; eastern terminus of SR 2
Knox	Farragut	395.93	637.19	SR 332 east (Concord Road)	
Knox	Farragut	397.07	639.02	SR 131 north (Lovell Road)	
Knox	Knoxville	397.74	640.10	I-140 (Pellissippi Parkway) – Maryville, Oak Ridge	I-140 exit 1
Knox	Knoxville	404.71	651.32	SR 332 (Northshore Drive)	
Knox	Knoxville	408.18	656.90	US 11 north / US 70 east (Neyland Drive)	Eastern end of US 11/US 70 overlap
Knox	Knoxville	408.44	657.32	US 129 (Alcoa Highway) to SR 115 / I-40 / I-75	Interchange
Knox	Knoxville	409.82	659.54	US 441 south (Henley Street) / SR 71	Western end of US 441 overlap
Knox	Knoxville	410.07	659.94	I-40 / I-275 north – Nashville, Asheville, Lexington	I-40 exit 388; I-275 exit 0A
Knox	Knoxville	410.17	660.10	SR 62 west (Western Avenue)	
Knox	Knoxville	410.55	660.72	US 441 north (Broadway)	Eastern end of US 441 overlap
Knox	Knoxville	411.02	661.47	US 11 south / US 70 east (Hall of Fame Drive)	Western end of US 11/US 70 overlap
Knox	Knoxville	414.01	666.28	US 11 ends US 11E north / US 70 east (Asheville Highway) US 11W begins	Eastern end of US 11/US 70 overlap; western terminus of US 11W
Knox	Knoxville	414.35	666.83	I-40 – Knoxville, Asheville	I-40 exit 392
Grainger	Blaine	428.85	690.17	SR 61 west – Luttrell, Maynardville	
Grainger	Rutledge	442.77	712.57	SR 92 south – Jefferson City, Dandridge	
Grainger	Bean Station	454.09	730.79	US 25E north – Tazewell	Interchange; western end of US 25E overlap
Grainger	Bean Station	456.79	735.13	US 25E south – Morristown	Interchange; eastern end of US 25E overlap
Hawkins	Mooresburg	460.23	740.67	SR 31 north – Sneedville	
Hawkins		470.43	757.08	SR 344 south (Melinda Ferry Road) – Saint Clair	
Hawkins	Rogersville	473.53	762.07	SR 66 / SR 70 south – Sneedville, Bulls Gap	Interchange; western end of SR 70 overlap
Hawkins	Rogersville	476.31	766.55	SR 70 north / SR 347 east – Sneedville, Pressmen's Home	Interchange; eastern end of SR 70 overlap
Hawkins	Surgoinsville	481.72	775.25	SR 346 north (Old Highway 11W)	
Hawkins	Surgoinsville	488.32	785.87	SR 346 south (Main Street)	Western end of SR 346 overlap
Hawkins	Church Hill	492.89	793.23	SR 346 north (Main Boulevard) / Goshen Valley Road	Eastern end of SR 346 overlap
Sullivan	Kingsport	501.35	806.84	I-26 east / US 23 – Gate City, Johnson City	I-26 exit 1
Sullivan	Kingsport	502.14	808.12	SR 36 (Lynn Garden Drive)	Interchange
Sullivan	Kingsport	510.99	822.36	SR 93 (John B Dennis Highway) – Bloomingdale, Greeneville	Interchange
Sullivan		514.99	828.80	SR 394 east to I-81 – Blountville	
Sullivan	Bristol	520.70	837.99	I-81 – Roanoke, Knoxville	I-81 exit 74
Sullivan	Bristol	522.95	841.61	SR 126 west (Blountville Highway) – Blountville	
Sullivan	Bristol	523.59	842.64	US 11W north (Lee Highway) / US 421 (Gate City Highway) / SR 34	Eastern end of US 11W overlap
Sullivan	Bristol	524.80	844.58	US 11E north / US 19 north / US 421 north (Commonwealth Avenue)	Western end of US 11E/US 19/US 421 overlap
Sullivan	Bristol	524.95	844.83	US 11E south / US 19 south (Volunteer Parkway) / US 421 south (Anderson Street)	Eastern terminus; eastern end of US 11E/US 19/US 421 overlap
1.000 mi = 1.609 km; 1.000 km = 0.621 mi: Concurrency terminus; Incomplete access

== See also ==
- List of state routes in Tennessee
- List of highways numbered 1
