= Tennessee State Route 145 =

State highway in Tennessee, United States

State Route 145
- SR 145 highlighted in red

Route information
- Maintained by TDOT
- Length: 9.72 mi (15.64 km)

Major junctions
- North end: SR 96 in Auburntown
- South end: US 70S in Woodbury

Location
- Country: United States
- State: Tennessee
- Counties: Cannon

Highway system
- Tennessee State Routes; Interstate; US; State
← SR 144	→ SR 146

State Route 145 (SR 145) is a relatively short north–south highway in Middle Tennessee. The road begins in Woodbury and ends in Auburntown. The current length is 9.72 mi (15.6 km).

== Route description ==
SR 145 begins at an intersection with US 70S/SR 1 in Woodbury just west of downtown. The highway goes northward as Auburntown Road to pass through a narrow valley before entering hilly terrain of the Highland Rim. SR 145 continues north through the hills before entering another valley. It passes through more farmland before entering Auburntown, where it becomes Woodbury Road. SR 145 then enters downtown and turns northeast for a short time as East Main Street, the former alignment of SR 96 through downtown, before coming to its northern terminus at SR 96.

At the highest point of SR 145, Dividing Ridge, the 1LT Frank B Walkup Memorial Bridge, aka Bridge to Nowhere was dedicated on December 20, 2009. The bridge offers scenic views of road and valley below and is a popular destination of bikers and others, including an annual New Year's Day event hosted by the Cornerstone Chapter of the Christian Motorcycle Association of Murfreesboro, Tennessee, in which hundreds of riders join together to begin the year and includes a blessing of bikes.

Throughout the year other bikers, both organized and not, include this bridge as a stop on their rides.

== Major intersections ==
The entire route is in Cannon County.

Location	mi	km	Destinations	Notes
Woodbury	0.0	0.0	US 70S (W Main Street/SR 1) – Murfreesboro, Readyville, Centertown, McMinnville	Southern terminus
Auburntown	9.72	15.64	SR 96 (E/W Poplar Bluff Road) – Murfreesboro, Liberty	Northern terminus
1.000 mi = 1.609 km; 1.000 km = 0.621 mi
