= Collins River =

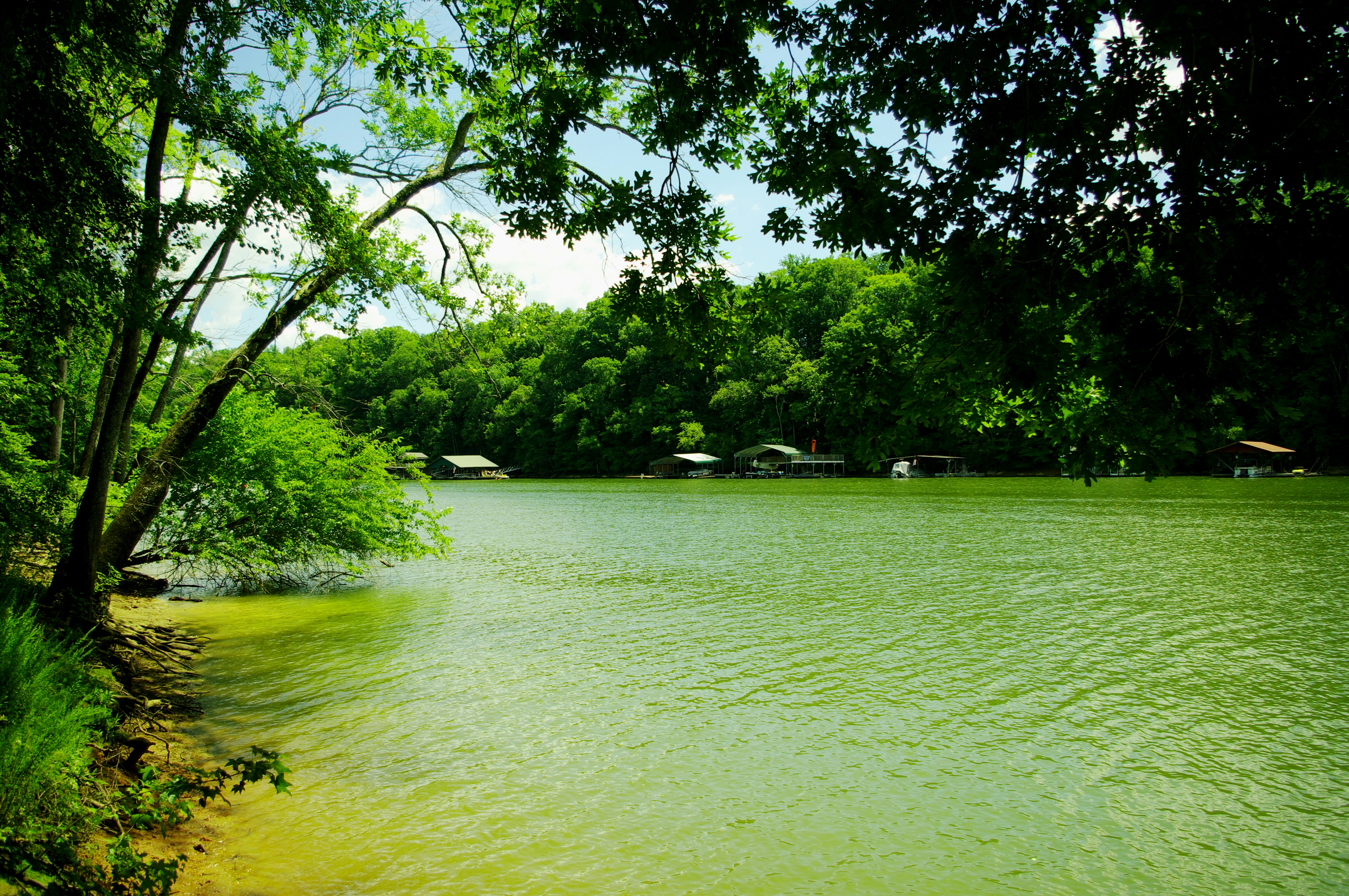
- The Collins River near Rock Island

Location
- Country: United States
- State: Tennessee

Physical characteristics
- Source: Northeast of Palmer in Grundy County
  - coordinates: 35°23′11″N 85°33′18″W
  - elevation: 1,740 ft (530 m)
- Mouth: Great Falls Lake (Caney Fork) at Rock Island
  - coordinates: 35°48′0″N 85°37′12″W
  - elevation: 804 ft (245 m)
- Length: 67 mi (108 km)
- Basin size: 811 mi^{2} (2,100 km^{2})
- Discharge
  - location: U.S. Highway 70S near McMinnville(mean for water years 1925–2005)
  - average: 1,193 cu ft/s (33.8 m^{3}/s)(mean for water years 1925–2005)
  - minimum: 25 cu ft/s (0.71 m^{3}/s)September 1930
  - maximum: 75,300 cu ft/s (2,130 m^{3}/s)March 1929

Basin features
- Tributaries
  - left: Barren Fork

The Collins River is a 67-mile-long (108 km) stream in the east-central portion of Middle Tennessee in the United States. It is a tributary of the Caney Fork, and is part of the Cumberland, Ohio and Mississippi watersheds. The river drains the scenic Savage Gulf area, located just below the river's source, and empties into Great Falls Lake at Rock Island State Park.

The Collins River passes through Grundy and Warren counties. McMinnville, Altamont, Gruetli-Laager and Beersheba Springs are among the communities located within its watershed. The Savage Gulf section of the Collins River has been designated a "scenic river" by the State of Tennessee.

== Course ==
The Collins River rises near the town of Palmer atop the Cumberland Plateau, where the Middle Prong Collins River (which descends from a nearby ridge) joins Mill Creek (which flows northward from Palmer). Flowing northwestwardly, the Collins passes under State Route 399 (Barkertown Road) before entering Savage Gulf, a scenic gorge where the river gradually descends 800 feet to the Highland Rim. The town of Beersheba Springs straddles the edge of the Plateau overlooking the river valley. State Route 56 crosses the Collins twice as it follows the river's valley out of the gorge.

Crossing into Warren County, the river veers northward along a meandering route, passing under State Route 8 (Harrison Ferry Road) and State Route 127 (Shellsford Road). Just east of McMinnville, the river absorbs its key tributary, Barren Fork, and passes under U.S. Route 70S. After winding its way northward for several miles, the river eventually turns eastward, passing under State Route 288 (Hennessee Bridge Road) as it enters the slack waters of Great Falls Lake.

At Rock Island State Park, the river enters an oxbow bend, nearly joining the Caney Fork before abruptly turning southward, then eastward, then northward again before finally emptying into the Caney Fork just upstream from Great Falls Dam. The oxbow creates a peninsula that contains much of the state park. Two bridges — an older truss bridge no longer in use, and a newer bridge that carries State Route 287 — cross the mouth of the Collins River.

== Watershed ==
The Collins River watershed covers 811 square miles (2,100 km^{2}), and drains parts of Warren, Grundy, Van Buren, Sequatchie, Coffee, and Cannon counties. The watershed contains 1,003 miles (1,614 km) of streams and 69 lake acres. Over half the watershed is forested, and just over a third is used for either pastures or row crops.

The upper parts of the river along the Cumberland Plateau flow along Pennsylvanian-era siltstone, shale and sandstone. Along the river's Highland Rim portion, Mississippian-era limestone is more common. Karst features such as sinkholes and caves are not uncommon in this area. One of the state's largest caves, Cumberland Caverns, is located within the Collins watershed.

The 23-mile (37 km) Barren Fork empties into the Collins east of McMinnville. Other tributaries include Big Creek and Savage Creek, which join the river at Savage Gulf, Hills Creek and Scott Creek, which empty into the Collins just north of the Warren-Grundy line, and Charles Creek, which empties into the river downstream from McMinnville.

== History ==
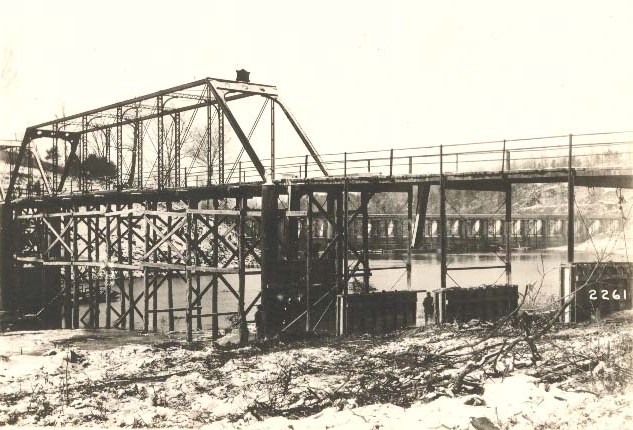
Collins River Bridge under construction in 1916

During the late 18th century, the Old Kentucky Road, which roughly followed an old Indian path, crossed the Collins River at Shells Ford, near modern McMinnville. A string of other commonly used fords were located just above the mouth of the river, including Flat Shoals Ford, near modern Campaign. Reed's Ferry, later known as Black's Ferry, operated near the modern U.S. Highway 70S crossing throughout much of the 19th century.

In the late 19th century, businessman Asa Faulkner constructed a wooden bridge across the mouth of the river as part of his Falls City development. Around 1900, Warren County built four bridges over the river: the Hennessee Bridge (approximately 8 miles above the river's mouth), the Lusk Bridge (near McMinnville), and Martin's Ferry Bridge and Harrison's Ferry Bridge, both located on the upper part of the river. A flood in late March 1902 destroyed Faulkner's bridge and two of the county's bridges– the Hennessee and the Lusk– along with bridges over Barren Fork and Charles Creek.

The Tennessee Electric Power Company built the truss bridge which still spans the mouth of the river as part of its Great Falls Dam project in 1916, and rebuilt and raised the bridge in the mid-1920s. The current vehicle bridge, which runs adjacent to the truss bridge, was built by the Tennessee Department of Transportation in the 1980s.

== Recreation ==
Most of the Collins River was designated a "scenic river" as part of the state's Scenic Rivers Program. The lower 42 miles (68 km) of the river were removed from this designation in 1983, however, and the scenic designation now applies only to the upper parts of the river at Savage Gulf.

A 15,590-acre (6,310 ha) scientific state natural area now protects the Savage Gulf area. This area is also part of South Cumberland State Park. The Collins Gulf Trail at Savage Gulf follows a portion of the river as it descends from the Cumberland Plateau.

The lower portion of the Collins River is part of Great Falls Lake, the reservoir created by Great Falls Dam near the river's confluence with the Caney Fork. The oxbow peninsula between the Collins and Caney Fork is part of Rock Island State Park. Part of the Collins River Trail, maintained by the park, passes along the wooded embankment above the shore of the river along this peninsula.

The Collins River is one of the few rivers in Tennessee with a good population of muskie (muskellunge). Muskie were stocked in various watersheds throughout Tennessee, including the Collins River from 1982 through 2006.

== See also ==
- Rocky River (Tennessee)
- List of rivers of Tennessee
