= Center Grove, Tennessee =

- Unincorporated community
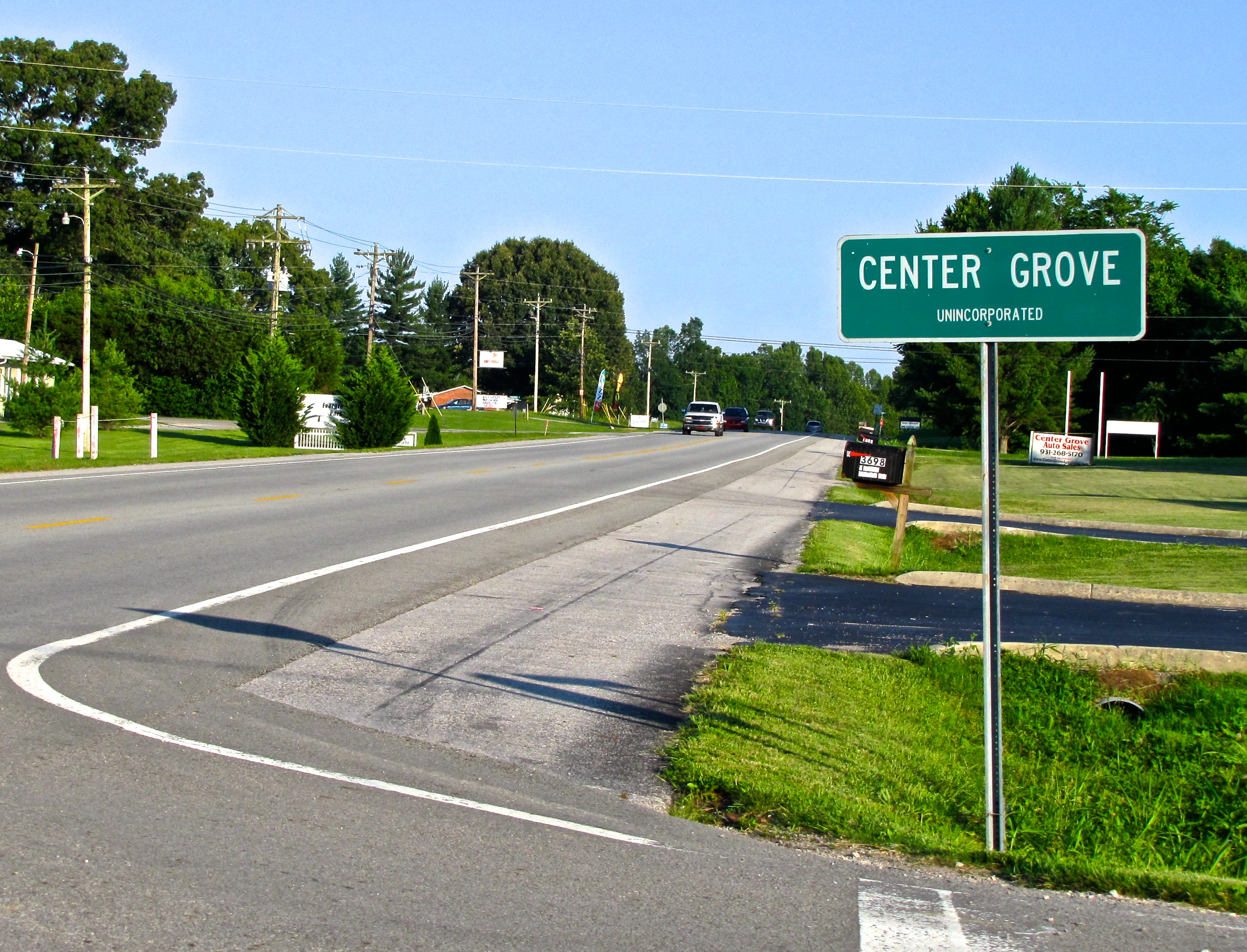
- SR 56 in Center Grove

- Location within Tennessee Location within the United States
- Coordinates: 36°15′50″N 85°36′30″W
- Country: United States
- State: Tennessee
- County: Jackson
- Elevation: 997 ft (304 m)
- Time zone: UTC-6 (Central (CST))
  - Summer (DST): UTC-5 (CDT)
- ZIP code: 38562
- Area code: 931
- GNIS feature ID: 1280124

Center Grove is an unincorporated community in Jackson County, Tennessee, United States. It is located along State Route 56 south of Gainesboro and northwest of Cookeville. The community is home to several churches and small businesses.

Center Grove is named for a church built in the area in the 1890s. The church stood in the middle of a grove of trees.
