= Great Falls Dam (Tennessee) =

Hydroelectric dam in Tennessee

- Great Falls Hydroelectric Station
- U.S. National Register of Historic Places
- U.S. Historic district
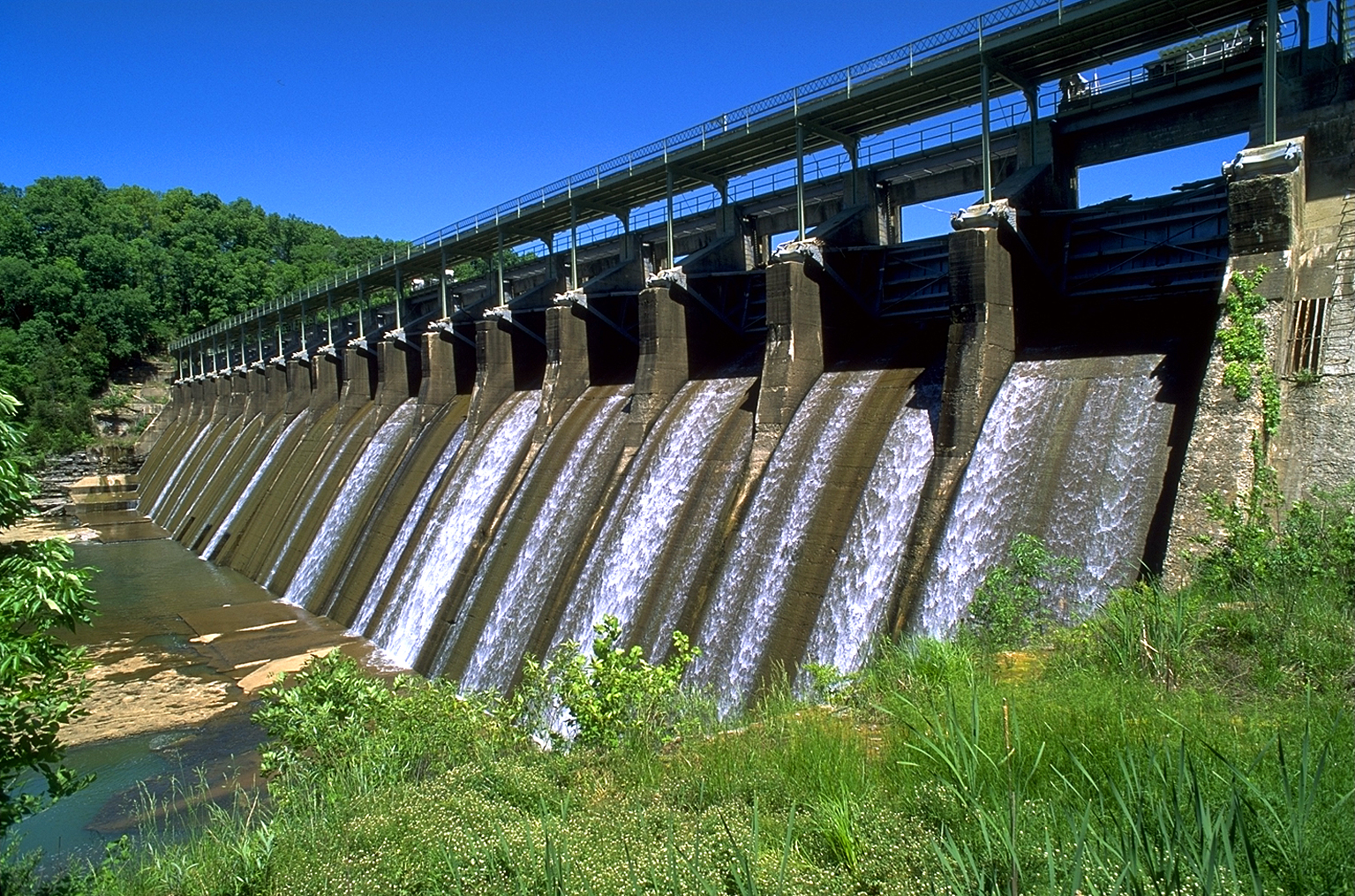
- Great Falls Dam

- Location within Tennessee Location within the United States
- Location: Warren / White counties, Tennessee, United States
- Nearest city: Rock Island, Tennessee
- Coordinates: 35°48′7″N 85°37′20″W
- Built: 1915–1916
- NRHP reference No.: 90001004
- Added to NRHP: 1990

Great Falls Dam is a hydroelectric dam on the Caney Fork, straddling the county line between White County and Warren County in the U.S. state of Tennessee. It is the only dam outside the Tennessee River watershed owned and operated by the Tennessee Valley Authority. The dam impounds the 1,830-acre (740 ha) Great Falls Lake, and its tailwaters feed into Center Hill Lake. The completion of Great Falls Dam in late 1916 was an engineering triumph, marking the first successful attempt to impound the volatile and flood-prone Caney Fork. The dam is also notable for its design, utilizing a mostly underground conduit to carry water from the reservoir via a tributary to the Power House 0.75 miles (1.21 km) downstream from the dam.

Great Falls Dam is named for the rapids and waterfalls on the Caney Fork downstream from the dam. The section of river below the powerhouse is world-renowned for whitewater kayaking. The dam and its tailwaters are surrounded by Rock Island State Park.

== Location ==
Great Falls Dam is located approximately 94 miles (151 km) above the mouth of the Caney Fork, immediately downstream from the Caney Fork's confluence with the Collins River. The confluence of these two rivers (the Collins flowing from the southwest and the Caney Fork from the east) creates a peninsula. The two rivers nearly meet at the Narrows, a "land bridge" connecting the peninsula to the mainland. Two tunnels measuring approximately 600 feet (180 m) each deliver water from the Collins River section of the Great Falls Reservoir underneath Highway 287 at the Narrows to the dam's powerhouse located on the Caney Fork 0.75 miles (1.21 km) downstream from the dam.

Great Falls Reservoir stretches behind the dam for 22 miles (35 km) along the Caney Fork and for roughly 10 miles (16 km) along the lower Collins River. The lake also includes a small stretch of the lower Rocky River, which empties into the Caney Fork about a mile east of the dam.

== Capacity ==
Great Falls Dam is a concrete gravity diversion type dam 92 feet (28 m) high and 800 feet (240 m) long, and has a generating capacity of 33,800 kilowatts (33.8 MW). The dam's spillway has 18 gates with a combined discharge of 150,000 cubic feet (4,200 m^{3}) per second. Great Falls Reservoir has approximately 49,000 acre-feet (60,000,000 m^{3}) of flood storage, 120 miles (190 km) of shoreline, and 1,830 acres (740 ha) of water surface.

== History ==
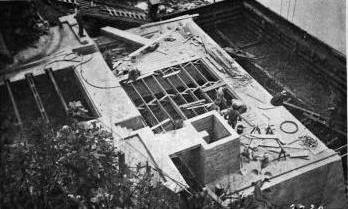
Construction work at the Great Falls Dam site, showing the entrance to the dam's diversion tunnel and part of a cofferdam

Throughout the 19th century, many attempts were made to harness the extraordinary hydro power potential of the Caney Fork only to be defeated by one of the volatile river's disastrous floods. The first major establishment to utilize the river's power at Great Falls was the Bosson Mill, a gristmill and carding factory that operated at the site across the river from the powerhouse from the 1860s until its destruction by a flood in 1882. The most prominent venture at Great Falls Gorge was the Falls City Cotton Mill Company, which established a cotton mill and company town, Falls City, just above the gorge in 1892. The company turned a moderate profit until 1902, when the Good Friday Flood destroyed its toll bridge and powerhouse, and the mill was forced to close (the mill and the town's "spring castle" are still standing, however).

By 1900, the rise of major industry in Nashville brought an increased demand for electricity. In 1901, Nashville entrepreneur Arthur Dyer formed the Great Falls Power Company and purchased land on the north side of the gorge with plans to build a dam. Dyer had trouble getting financing for the project, however, and in 1912 sold Great Falls Power to the Tennessee Power Company. The original plans called for a dam 110 feet (34 m) high. At the Narrows, where the two tunnels are now located, an open channel was to be made from the Collins River to the Caney Fork. The water was to be carried across the gorge in a steel flume and then in an open canal across Horseshoe Bend, a distance of 1.5 miles (2.4 km). The powerhouse was to be located at least 3 miles (4.8 km) by river below the present powerhouse. In so doing a total head of 235 feet (72 m) would have been available; 110 feet (34 m) at the dam, 75 feet (23 m) between the dam and the present powerhouse and 50 feet (15 m) around horseshoe bend.

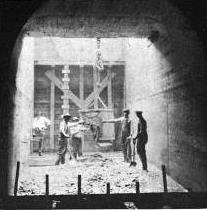
Construction of the dam's diversion tunnel

With financing from Chicago business interests, Tennessee Power began construction work on the dam's foundation. Within a month, however, the Caney Fork burst its banks again, flooding out the project's excavation work and destroying its cofferdams. Tennessee Power struggled with finances but was able to resume construction in 1915, and by late 1916 the 40 feet (12 m) high dam had been completed. The plant went into operation on January 1, 1917.

In 1922, the Tennessee Power Company merged with several other entities to form the Tennessee Electric Power Company (TEPCO). TEPCO tripled the capacity of Great Falls Dam by raising the dam 35 feet (11 m) and installing a second generator at the powerhouse downstream. The dam faced its first major test in March 1929, when several cloudbursts atop the Cumberland Plateau caused the Caney Fork to expand to record flood volumes, sending wreckage and uprooted trees crashing into the dam. The Great Falls Power House was flooded and a substation was destroyed, but the dam held.

The passage of the TVA Act in 1933 gave the Tennessee Valley Authority oversight of flood control operations in the Tennessee River watershed, where most of TEPCO's dams were located. Jo Conn Guild, the head of TEPCO, vehemently opposed TVA and challenged the constitutionality of the TVA Act in federal court. After the U.S. Supreme Court upheld the act, however, TEPCO was forced under eminent domain to sell its assets to TVA for $78 million. This sum included $3.5 million for Great Falls Dam.

After its acquisition, TVA began making improvements to Great Falls Dam. By 1946, grouting work had repaired much of the leakage through the cliffside, which had been an issue since the dam's creation. TVA also built a new switchyard and control building. In the late 1960s, the agency leased part of the Great Falls reservation to the state for the development of Rock Island State Park, which opened in 1969.
