= Midway, Warren County, Tennessee =

Midway
- Unincorporated community
- Location within Tennessee Location within the United States
- Coordinates: 35°48′05″N 85°42′11″W
- Country: United States
- State: Tennessee
- County: Warren
- Elevation: 994 ft (303 m)
- Time zone: UTC-6 (Central (CST))
  - Summer (DST): UTC-5 (CDT)
- Area code: 931
- GNIS feature ID: 1315500

Midway is an unincorporated community in Warren County, Tennessee. Midway is located on Tennessee State Route 288 9 miles (14 km) north-northeast of McMinnville.
