= Morrison, Tennessee =

- Town
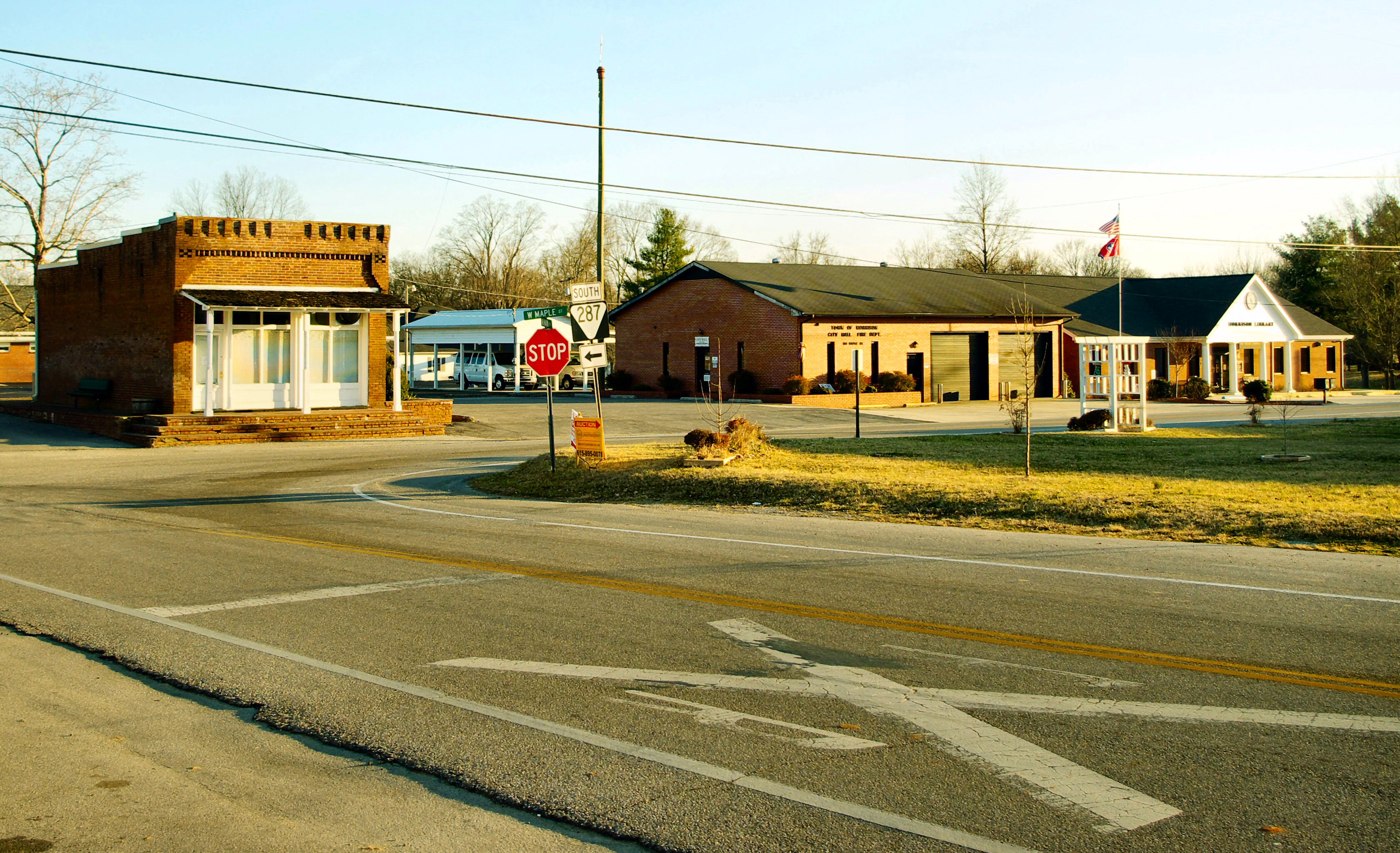
- Intersection of TN-287 and TN-379, with city hall and library on the right

- Location of Morrison in Warren County, Tennessee.
- Coordinates: 35°36′18″N 85°54′54″W
- Country: United States
- State: Tennessee
- County: Warren

Area
  - Total: 2.99 sq mi (7.74 km^{2})
  - Land: 2.99 sq mi (7.74 km^{2})
  - Water: 0 sq mi (0.00 km^{2})
- Elevation: 1,073 ft (327 m)

Population (2020)
  - Total: 733
  - Density: 245.2/sq mi (94.69/km^{2})
- Time zone: UTC-6 (Central (CST))
  - Summer (DST): UTC-5 (CDT)
- ZIP code: 37357
- Area code: 931
- FIPS code: 47-50220
- GNIS feature ID: 1294442
- Website: https://www.morrisoncity.org/

Morrison is a town in Warren County, Tennessee, United States. As of the 2020 census, Morrison had a population of 733.

== Geography ==
Morrison is located at 35°36′18″N 85°54′54″W (35.604869, -85.915004).

According to the United States Census Bureau, the town has a total area of 2.7 square miles (7.0 km^{2}), all of it land.

== Demographics ==
Historical population
Census	Pop.	Note	%±
1910	149		—
1920	271		81.9%
1930	265		−2.2%
1940	278		4.9%
1950	301		8.3%
1960	294		−2.3%
1970	379		28.9%
1980	587		54.9%
1990	570		−2.9%
2000	684		20.0%
2010	694		1.5%
2020	733		5.6%

=== 2020 census ===
Morrison racial composition
Race	Number	Percentage
White (non-Hispanic)	526	71.76%
Black or African American (non-Hispanic)	36	4.91%
Native American	2	0.27%
Asian	3	0.41%
Pacific Islander	1	0.14%
Other/Mixed	26	3.55%
Hispanic or Latino	139	18.96%

As of the 2020 United States census, there were 733 people, 202 households, and 151 families residing in the town.

=== 2000 census ===
As of the census of 2000, there were 684 people, 254 households, and 185 families residing in the town. The population density was 251.9 inhabitants per square mile (97.3/km^{2}). There were 276 housing units at an average density of 101.6 per square mile (39.2/km^{2}). The racial makeup of the town was 88.45% White, 9.65% African American, 0.15% Native American, 1.02% from other races, and 0.73% from two or more races. Hispanic or Latino of any race were 2.49% of the population.

There were 254 households, out of which 37.4% had children under the age of 18 living with them, 54.3% were married couples living together, 15.4% had a female householder with no husband present, and 26.8% were non-families. 22.8% of all households were made up of individuals, and 12.6% had someone living alone who was 65 years of age or older. The average household size was 2.62 and the average family size was 3.05.

In the town, the population was spread out, with 28.7% under the age of 18, 9.6% from 18 to 24, 27.9% from 25 to 44, 19.4% from 45 to 64, and 14.3% who were 65 years of age or older. The median age was 35 years. For every 100 females, there were 85.9 males. For every 100 females age 18 and over, there were 83.5 males.

The median income for a household in the town was $23,819, and the median income for a family was $31,250. Males had a median income of $28,125 versus $21,250 for females. The per capita income for the town was $13,105. About 20.6% of families and 23.9% of the population were below the poverty line, including 33.9% of those under age 18 and 9.2% of those age 65 or over.

== Notable people ==
- Robert Brown, cartoonist.
- P. Allen Smith, gardening and lifestyle expert.
