= Caney Fork River =

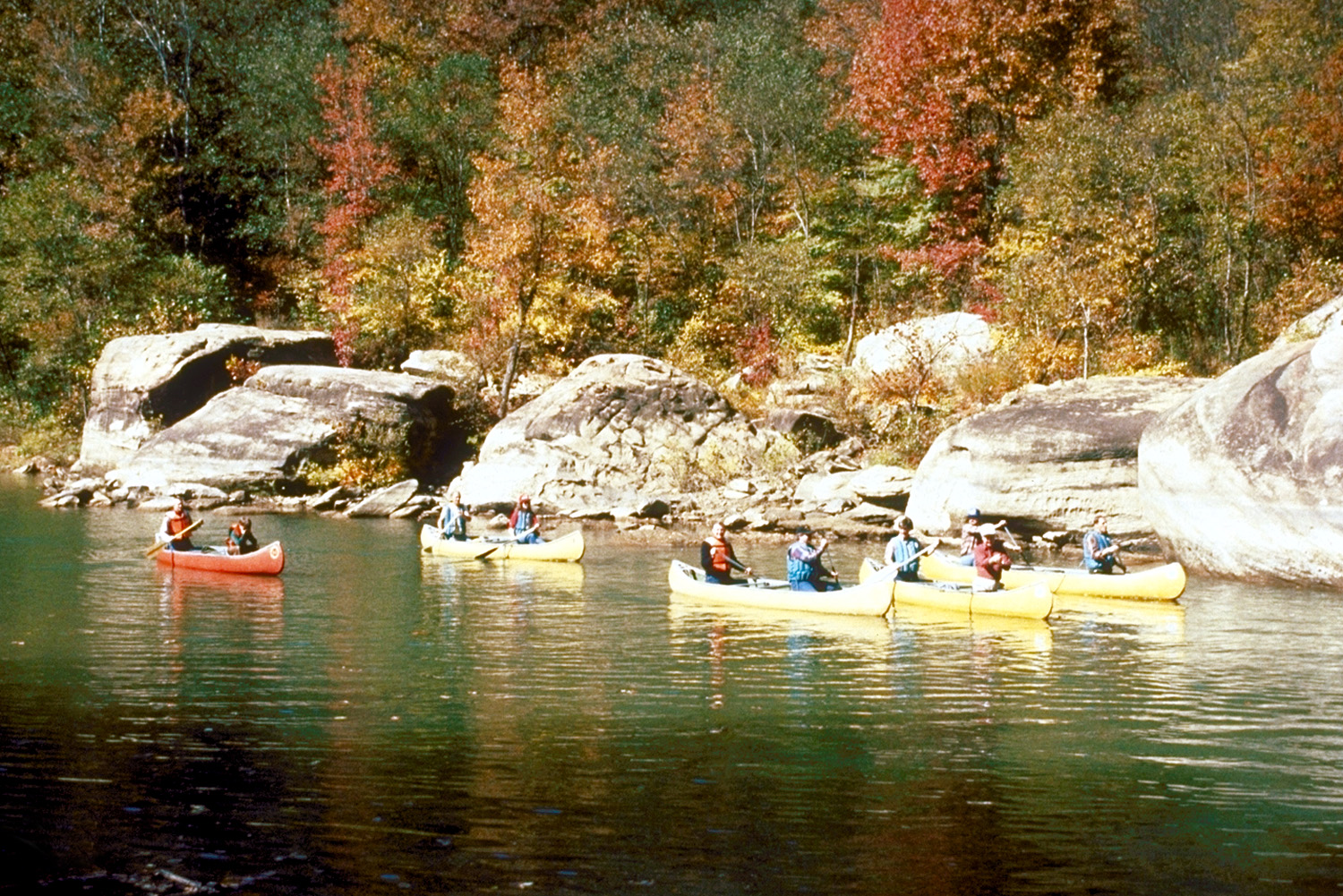
- Canoeing on the upper Caney Fork

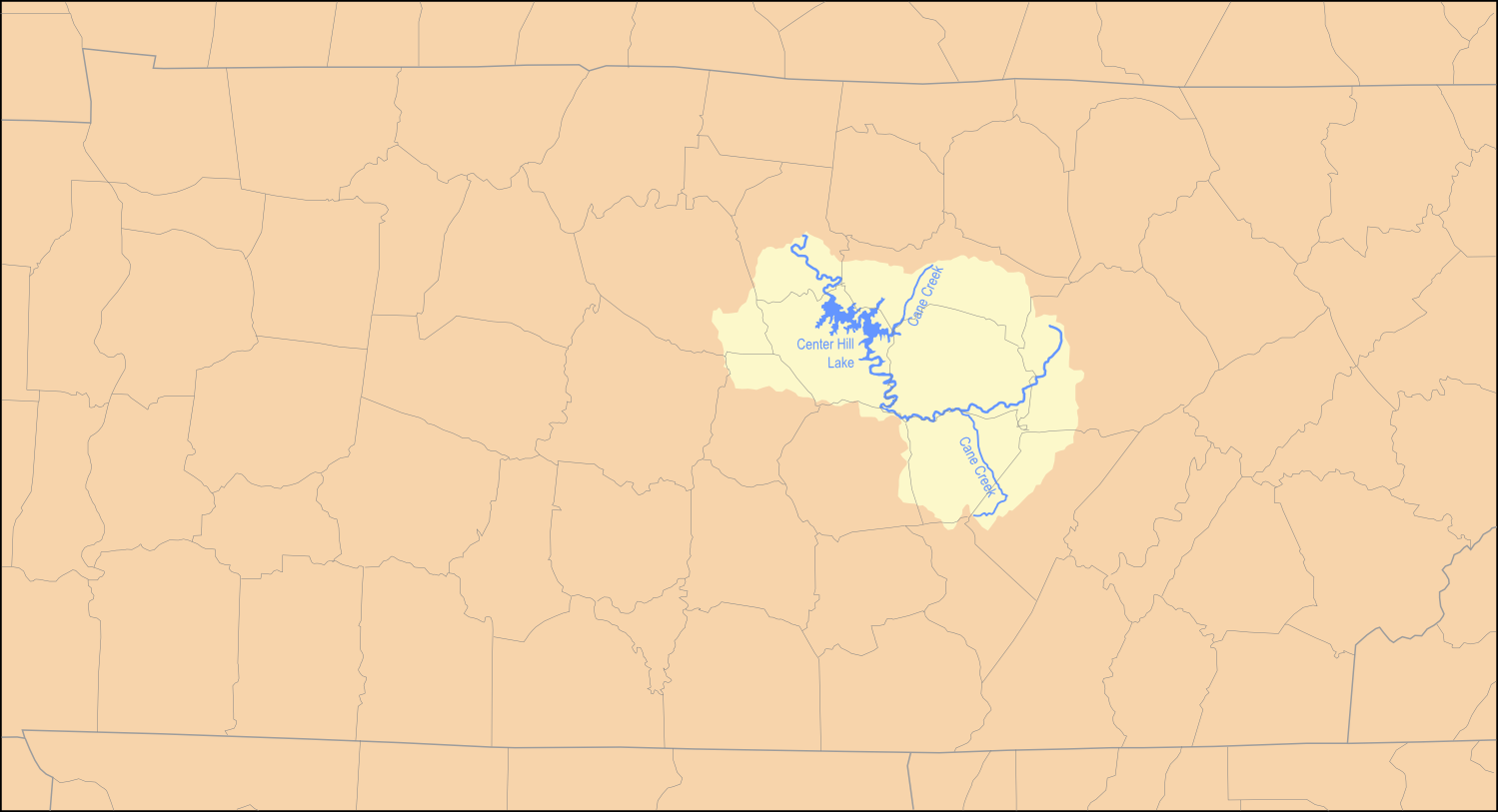
- Caney Fork watershed

Location
- Country: United States
- State: Tennessee

Physical characteristics
- Source: Near Campbell Junction in Cumberland County
  - coordinates: 36°02′36″N 85°09′30″W
  - elevation: 1,960 ft (600 m)
- Mouth: Cumberland River (Old Hickory Lake) at Carthage
  - coordinates: 36°14′20″N 85°56′29″W
  - elevation: 446 ft (136 m)
- Length: 143 mi (230 km)
- Basin size: 1,771 sq mi (4,590 km^{2})
- Discharge
  - location: Great Falls Dam powerhouse(mean for water years 1915-1983)
  - average: 3,177 cu ft/s (90.0 m^{3}/s)(mean for water years 1915-1983)
  - minimum: 25 cu ft/s (0.71 m^{3}/s); August 1951
  - maximum: 210,000 cu ft/s (5,900 m^{3}/s); March 1929

Basin features
- Tributaries
  - left: Rocky River, Collins River, Smith Fork Creek
  - right: Calfkiller River, Falling Water River, Mine Lick Creek, Indian Creek

The Caney Fork River is a river that flows through central Tennessee in the United States, draining a substantial portion of the southwestern Cumberland Plateau and southeastern Highland Rim regions. It is a major tributary of the Cumberland River, and is part of the Cumberland, Ohio and Mississippi basins. The river is 143 miles (230 km) long, and its watershed covers 1,771 square miles (4,590 km^{2}) in eleven counties. Monterey, Baxter, Sparta, Smithville, McMinnville, Altamont, Spencer and Gordonsville are among the towns that are at least partially drained by the river.

The Caney Fork flows through two impoundments— Center Hill Lake and Great Falls Lake— both of which create sizeable artificial lakes. The river's basin is home to numerous protected lands and recreational areas, including five state wilderness areas, six interpretive areas, and a wildlife management area. Two state parks— Edgar Evins State Park and Rock Island State Park— are located along the river, and three others— Fall Creek Falls State Park, Burgess Falls State Park and South Cumberland State Park— are located within its basin. The river is a popular stream for canoeing and kayaking.

The name "Caney Fork" comes from the dense cane breaks that grew along the river's banks when European explorers first arrived in the area.

The river is a major drainage feature of the Cumberland Plateau and the largest tributary of the Cumberland River.

== Geography ==
The Caney Fork rises in Cumberland County about 6 miles (10 km) west-northwest of Crossville before flowing southwest and crossing into White County. In southeastern White County it descends off the Cumberland Plateau through a deep and steep gorge known as Scott's Gulf in a remote area west of Scott Pinnacle, a locally-known mountain. Farther downstream, near the Dodson community, the stream becomes the border between White and Van Buren County. It receives the flow of the Calfkiller River and several minor tributaries.

Located at the confluence of the Caney Fork, the Collins River and the Rocky River, is Great Falls Lake. This reservoir is impounded by Great Falls Dam, a project of the former Tennessee Electric Power Company, now owned and operated by the Tennessee Valley Authority (TVA). This is the only dam outside of the Tennessee River drainage system directly operated by TVA. This dam impounds a very small but very deep lake due to the depth of the gorges carved by the rivers it impounds. This area was something of a resort area in the early 20th century when such projects were uncommon, especially in the southeastern United States, but other than a few cabins, there is little evidence of this today, as the area has been largely supplanted by larger, more modern developments. The dam is named for the Great Falls of the Caney Fork, caused by the descent of the stream off of the Highland Rim to the level of the Nashville Basin. Located on the lake is Rock Island State Park, developed on the site of former woolen mills in the 19th century predating the electrical development. This area was used for a considerable number of exterior shots and stunts in the Sylvester Stallone film, The Specialist.

At the foot of Great Falls Dam the water is usually slack except during periods of high discharge due to the influence of the U.S. Army Corps of Engineers Center Hill Dam project in DeKalb County further downstream, developed in the late 1950s. Unlike the Great Falls Dam, this project flooded several small communities and thousands of acres of land previously devoted to agriculture. It is crossed by a particularly scenic bridge on State Route 56. Along its shores is Edgar Evins State Park, named for the father of the area's former Representative, Joe L. Evins, former chairman of the House Appropriations Committee.

Below Center Hill Dam, the stream crosses into Smith County and is bridged by Interstate 40 five times in under four miles. This downstream section is annually stocked with Rainbow, Brown, and Brook trout by the Tennessee Wildlife Resources Agency (TWRA), and is considered to be one of the best trout rivers in the state. A final bridge, reconstructed in 2014, is on U.S. Route 70N near the Elmwood community. The river's mouth into the Cumberland River, which is considered to be a world class striper fishery, is almost directly opposite the Smith County seat of Carthage. A farm belonging to former Vice President Al Gore and formerly his late father, Senator Albert Gore Sr., is located along here.

== In popular culture ==
The bluegrass band Balsam Range has a song of the same name on their album "Last Train to Kitty Hawk".

Canadian Folksinger, Old Man Luedecke has a song entitled "Caney Fork River" on his album "My Hands Are On Fire and Other Love Songs".

== See also ==
- Scott's Gulf
- Rock Island State Park
- Center Hill Lake
- List of rivers of Tennessee
