= Viola, Tennessee =

- Town
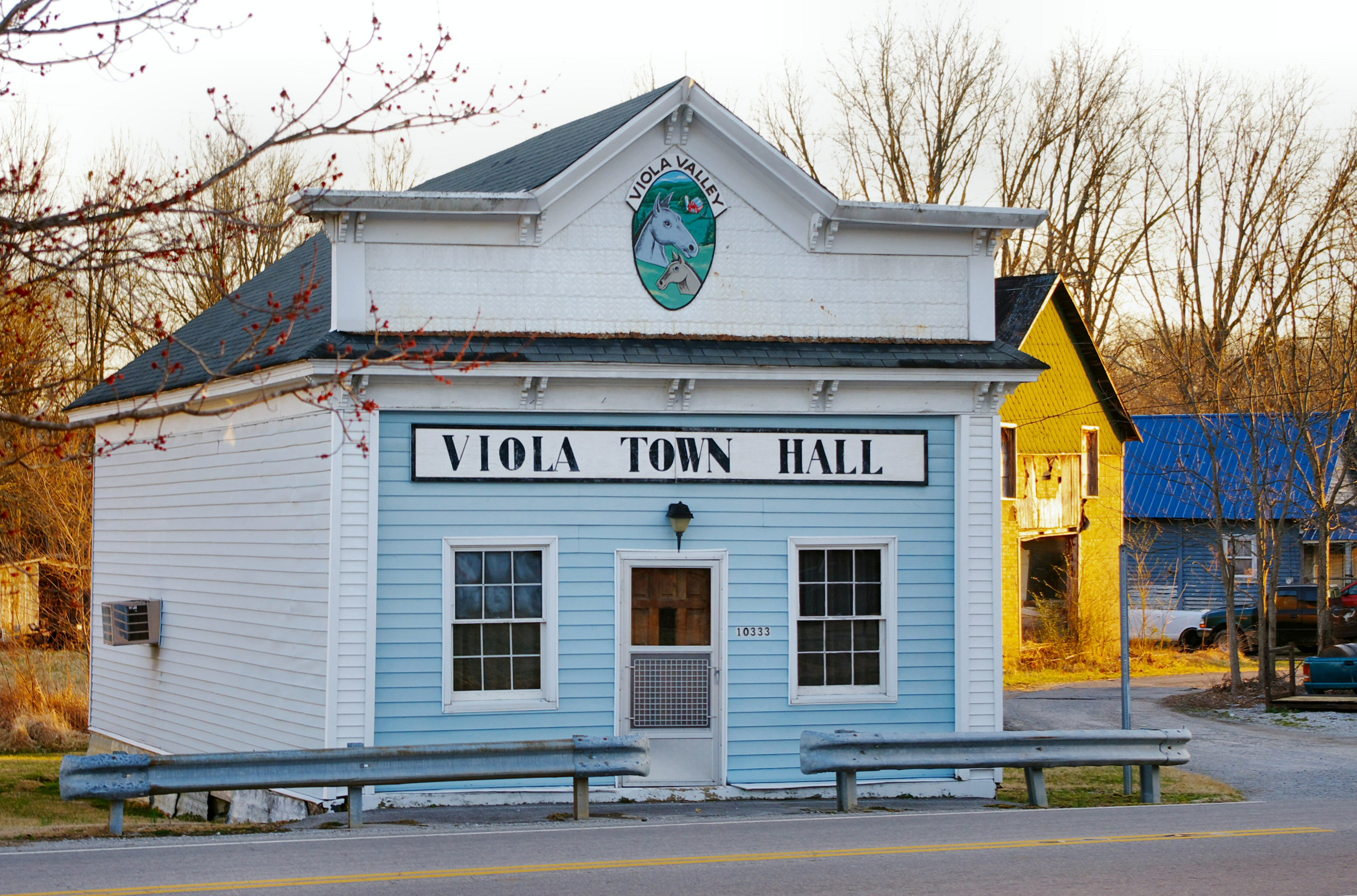
- Viola Town Hall

- Location of Viola in Warren County, Tennessee.
- Coordinates: 35°32′17″N 85°51′38″W
- Country: United States
- State: Tennessee
- County: Warren
- Incorporated: 1901
- Named for: Viola, character in Shakespeare's Twelfth Night

Government
  - Type: Mayor and Board of Aldermen
  - Mayor: William Ramsey

Area
  - Total: 0.49 sq mi (1.26 km^{2})
  - Land: 0.49 sq mi (1.26 km^{2})
  - Water: 0 sq mi (0.00 km^{2})
- Elevation: 1,001 ft (305 m)

Population (2020)
  - Total: 93
  - Density: 191.4/sq mi (73.91/km^{2})
- Time zone: UTC-6 (Central (CST))
  - Summer (DST): UTC-5 (CDT)
- ZIP code: 37394
- Area code: 931
- FIPS code: 47-77400
- GNIS feature ID: 1304310

Viola is a town in Warren County, Tennessee, United States. As of the 2020 census, Viola had a population of 93.

== Geography ==
According to the United States Census Bureau, the town has a total area of 0.2 square miles (0.52 km^{2}), all of it land.

== History ==
Viola was founded in the late 1700s as the settlement of Blue Springs. It was home to one of the earliest churches in Tennessee of the Separate Baptists and several members of the denomination lived there. The settlement formerly named Blue Springs was named Viola with the opening of the first post office on August 23, 1858. The post office was named for Viola, the fictional character in Shakespeare's play Twelfth Night.

Until closing in 1973 the Viola Mill produced the popular regional brand of flour "Viola's Best." This mill was later scrapped and the materials used to build a mill at The Farm.

== Demographics ==
Historical population
Census	Pop.	Note	%±
1850	1,596		—
1870	944		—
1910	177		—
1920	183		3.4%
1930	250		36.6%
1940	240		−4.0%
1950	223		−7.1%
1960	206		−7.6%
1970	193		−6.3%
1980	149		−22.8%
1990	123		−17.4%
2000	129		4.9%
2010	131		1.6%
2020	93		−29.0%

As of the census of 2000, there were 129 people, 52 households, and 37 families residing in the town. The population density was 776.0 inhabitants per square mile (299.6/km^{2}). There were 59 housing units at an average density of 354.9 per square mile (137.0/km^{2}). The racial makeup of the town was 85.27% White, 3.88% African American, 4.65% from other races, and 6.20% from two or more races. Hispanic or Latino of any race were 6.20% of the population.

There were 52 households, out of which 23.1% had children under the age of 18 living with them, 50.0% were married couples living together, 15.4% had a female householder with no husband present, and 28.8% were non-families. 25.0% of all households were made up of individuals, and 9.6% had someone living alone who was 65 years of age or older. The average household size was 2.48 and the average family size was 2.97.

In the town, the population was spread out, with 19.4% under the age of 18, 13.2% from 18 to 24, 27.1% from 25 to 44, 24.8% from 45 to 64, and 15.5% who were 65 years of age or older. The median age was 36 years. For every 100 females, there were 98.5 males. For every 100 females age 18 and over, there were 103.9 males.

The median income for a household in the town was $37,188, and the median income for a family was $46,750. Males had a median income of $35,313 versus $31,250 for females. The per capita income for the town was $18,803. There were 7.7% of families and 16.0% of the population living below the poverty line, including 14.8% of under eighteens and 12.5% of those over 64.

== Arts and culture ==
=== Annual cultural events ===
The town hosts the annual Viola Valley Homecoming which features a parade, tractor pull, and other events. The town is also about 15 miles from Great Stage Park, the location of the annual Bonnaroo Music Festival.

=== Museums ===
The Viola Valley Farmer's Museum & Collectibles features farm equipment, and collectibles.
