= Rock Island State Park (Tennessee) =

Park in Warren and White Counties, Tennessee, United States

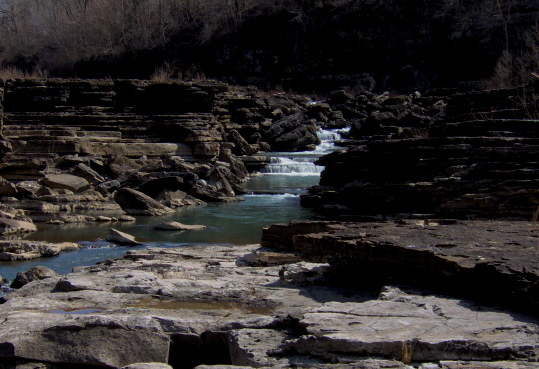
- The Caney Fork in the Great Falls Gorge
- Interactive map of Rock Island State Park
- Location: Rock Island, Warren County and White County, Tennessee, United States
- Coordinates: 35°48′31″N 85°38′29″W
- Area: 883 acres (3.57 km^{2})
- Created: 1969
- Owner: Tennessee Valley Authority
- Manager: Tennessee Department of Environment and Conservation
- Open: Year around
- Website: official website

Rock Island State Park is a state park in Warren County and White County, Tennessee, located in the Southeastern United States. The park is named after the community of Rock Island, Tennessee, which in turn received its name from an island on the Caney Fork upstream from the Collins River confluence and Great Falls Dam. Rock Island State Park is centered on a peninsula created by the confluence of these two rivers and extends downstream to the headwaters of Center Hill Lake.

The park consists of 883 acres (3.57 km^{2}) and is managed by the Tennessee Department of Environment and Conservation.

== Geographical setting ==
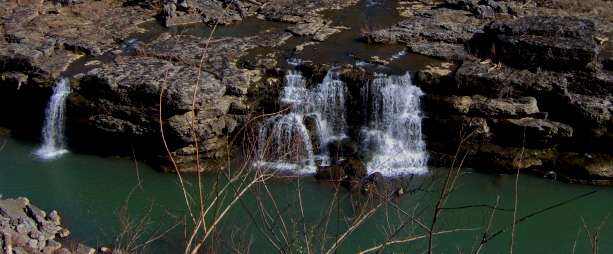
Great Falls

The Caney Fork winds its way westward from its source atop the Cumberland Plateau and drops down to the Highland Rim at Scott's Gulf, where it enters White County. Just past Scott's Gulf, the river gains strength, absorbing Cane Creek and the Calfkiller River as it winds along the base of the plateau. At the community of Walling, the river briefly turns southward and absorbs the Rocky River before turning westward again. Two miles beyond its Rocky River confluence, the Caney Fork absorbs the Collins and enters the Great Falls Gorge. Beyond the gorge, the river enters the upper extremes of its Center Hill Lake impoundment and begins winding its way northward toward its mouth along the Cumberland River, near Carthage.

The Collins River rises atop the Cumberland Plateau several miles south of Rock Island State Park at the head of a canyon known as Savage Gulf. The river winds its way northward through a section of the Highland Rim known as "the Barrens," and steadies as it enters the eastern section of McMinnville. The river almost joins the Caney Fork at a point just opposite the Great Falls Dam power plant, but instead bends southward to create the peninsula where the present park is located.

Rock Island, the park's namesake, is an island located in the Caney Fork at 35.79502°N 85.60448°W, approximately 1 mile (1.6 km) upstream from the present site of Great Falls Dam. The community of Rock Island is located along Great Falls Lake east of the state park.

== Natural and historical features ==
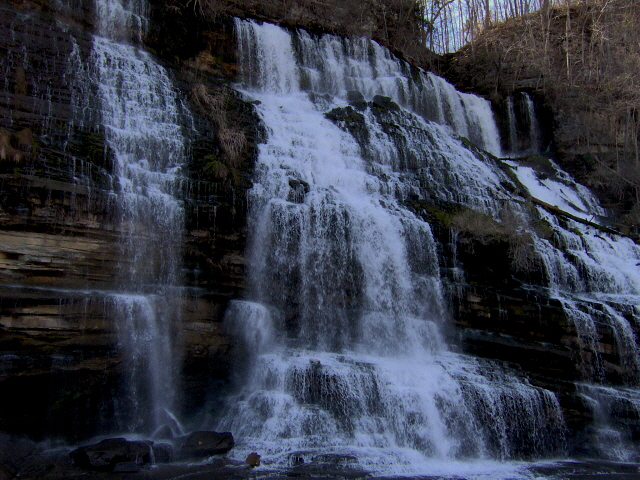
Twin Falls

- The Great Falls Gorge, located between northern Great Falls Dam and the dam's powerhouse. The gorge includes Great Falls, a series of plunge and cascade waterfalls that spill into the Caney Fork when the river's water levels are low. When water levels are high, the gorge completely fills up, submerging the waterfalls. A short trail leads from the parking lot to the base of the gorge.
- Twin Falls, a cascade waterfall that spills down from a cavern into the Caney Fork, just beyond the powerhouse. The waterfall was created by the Great Falls Dam, which caused the Collins River to rise. The rising waters began seeping into caverns on Rock Island's south shore and exiting at the falls on the north shore.

=== Historic structures ===
- The Great Falls Cotton Mill (also called the Falls City Cotton Mill), located on the bluffs above Great Falls. The mill was built in 1892 and operated until 1902. In 1982 it was added to the National Register of Historic Places.
- The Spring castle, located adjacent to the cotton mill. The "castle," which is essentially a larger version of a spring house, was used by the cotton mill's workers for refrigeration. It was probably built in the 1890s.
- The Great Falls Dam, located along the Caney Fork near the park's TN-136 entrance. The dam was built 1915-1916. In 1990 it was added to the National Register of Historic Places.

== History ==
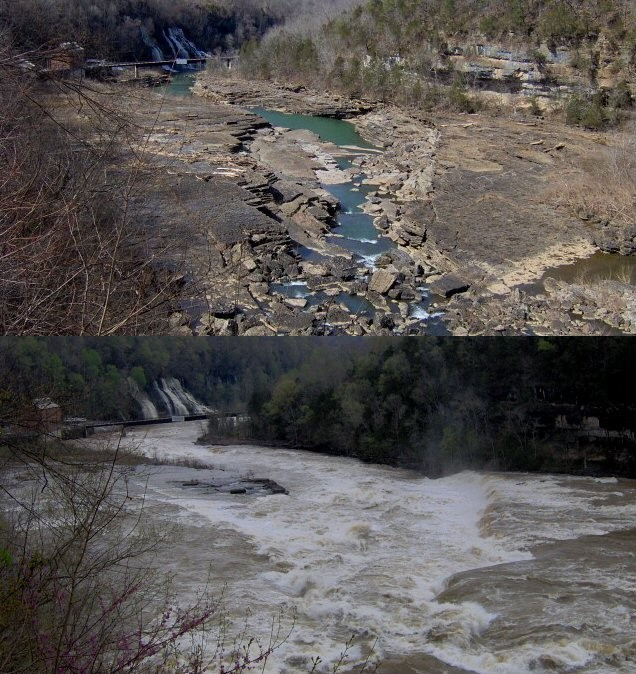
The Caney Fork at low (top photo) and high (bottom photo) water levels

=== Industry and flooding ===
The history of the Caney Fork from the end of the Civil War to the beginning of the 1920s tells the story of entrepreneur after entrepreneur attempting to harness the Caney Fork's alluring power potential only to be defeated by the river's volatile flash-flood tendencies. In his "Ode to the Caney Fork," local poet R.P. Hudson summed up this period:

Playful river, ever laughing,
Pleading river, always calling,
Rushing river, now unwieldy,
Wild, deep river, oft defiant.

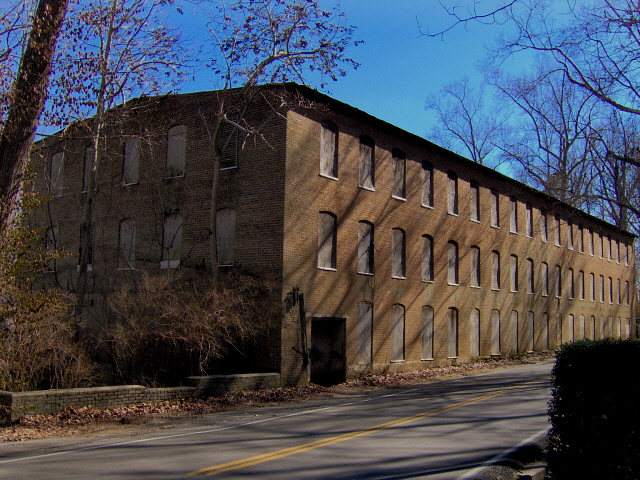
Great Falls Cotton Mill, listed on the National Register of Historic Places in 1982.

The Bosson Mill, built around the time of the Civil War, was one of the first major mills to use the waterpower of the Great Falls Gorge. Water from the falls was used to power a grist mill on the mill's first floor and a carding factory on the second floor. Water was then diverted via flume to a sawmill downstream. The Bosson Mill, which was moderately profitable, was destroyed when the Caney Fork flooded in 1882.

In 1881, the completion of a railroad brought larger industries to the area. In the mid-1880s, entrepreneur Asa Faulkner purchased the Bosson Mill property with plans to build a large cotton mill. Faulkner and several partners raised $30,000 in capital and chartered the Falls City Cotton Mill Company in 1892. The company built a wheelhouse to harness the power from Great Falls and divert it to the cotton mill, higher up on the bluffs. The company also developed a small town for the mill's workers which became known as "Falls City." Along with the spring castle that still stands, the town had its own post office and general store. In 1902, however, the company met the same fate as the Bosson Mill when the Caney Fork flooded again. The mill was high enough to escape harm, but its wheelhouse was completely wiped out. The flood also destroyed the company's tollbridge, which spanned the river just upstream. The company abandoned the mill shortly thereafter and the town died out.

In 1904, the Great Falls Power Company purchased the Great Falls property with plans to dam the Caney Fork and provide power to the Nashville area. The company built several coffer dams, all of which were destroyed when the river flooded in 1914. The company, which often struggled with finances, finally began construction on the Great Falls Hydroelectric Plant in 1915, and the dam went into operation in 1917. The Tennessee Electric Power Company (TEPCo) purchased the Great Falls Power Company in 1922, and tripled the dam's operating capacity. The Good Friday Flood of 1929, in which the Caney Fork reached record volumes, destroyed the dam's substation and flooded its powerhouse, but the dam held. In 1939, the TEPCO Dam was purchased by the Tennessee Valley Authority, which continues to operate it.

=== The state park ===
The creation of a lake by the Great Falls Dam brought numerous recreational opportunities to Rock Island. The Webb Hotel arrived in the area in 1920, and several rustic cabins were built later in the decade. By the 1930s, Rock Island had grown into a small fishing resort. Rock Island State Park was established in 1969.

The Rock Island area was used for a considerable number of exterior shots and stunts in the 1994 Sylvester Stallone film, The Specialist.

== The park today ==
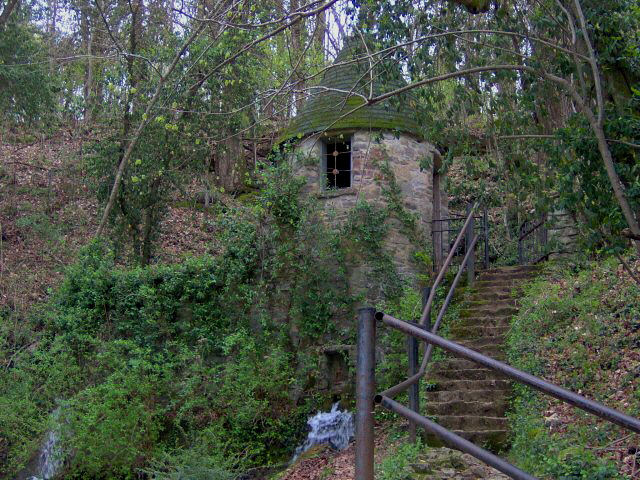
Spring castle

Rock Island State Park currently maintains 10 cabins, 60 campsites, and a boat ramp. The park's Center Hill Lake section contains a natural sand beach and a popular fishing area known as the "Blue Hole." Hiking trails include two trails that access the north and south banks of the Great Falls Gorge, and a 3-mile (4.8 km) trail that runs along the Collins River. Deer, woodpeckers, and wildflowers are common sights along the park's trails.

In recent years, Rock Island State Park has become popular with kayakers, who use the river for playboating. Below Great Falls Dam is a series of rapids with a well-known, constant, retentive "hole" that allows playboaters to hone their whitewater kayaking skills, riding the wave, spinning, rolling and performing other tricks.

Rock Island State Park also maintains the Big Bone Cave State Natural Area, which is located a few miles to the east in Van Buren County.
