= Rock Island, Tennessee =

Unincorporated community in Tennessee, US

Coordinates: 35°47′32″N 85°36′48″W

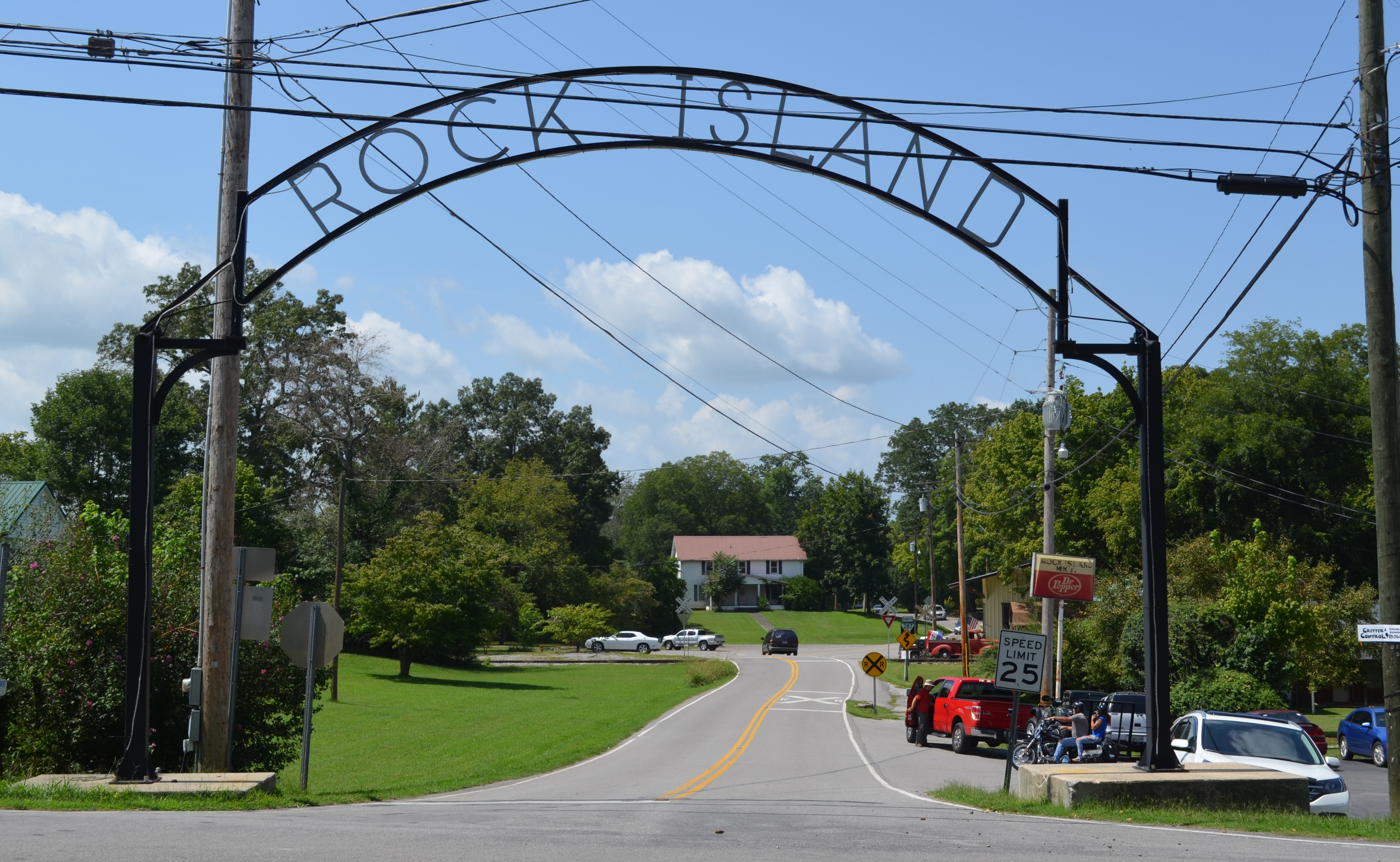
Rock Island's town sign is a landmark in the area

Rock Island is an unincorporated community in the northeasternmost portion of Warren County, Tennessee, United States. The town is named after an island on the Caney Fork River just below the confluence of the Rocky River. Rock Island is home to the Great Falls Dam and Rock Island State Park.

Many different houses, restaurants, and marinas can be found here. Rock Island is a popular destination during the summer season. It is known for scenic waterfalls and bluffs. Boats can often be seen on the river riding by. The state park offers many different hiking trails as well as a sand bar (almost a beach front).

== History ==
=== Early history ===
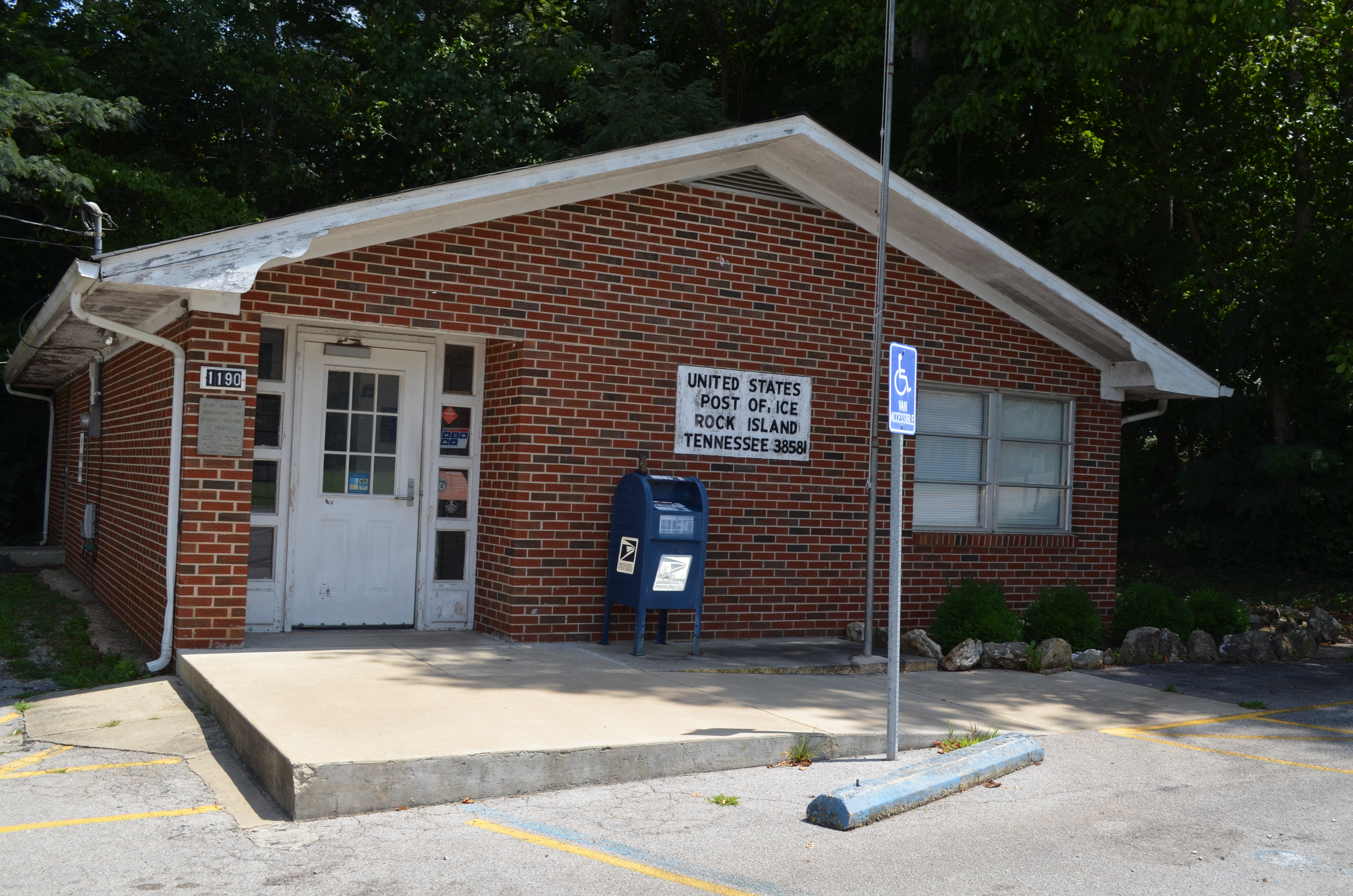
U.S. Post office in Rock Island

The Chickamauga Path, which spanned Middle Tennessee north-to-south, connecting the area with Kentucky and Alabama, forded the Caney Fork at a large rock island. This path later became the Old Kentucky Road, which roughly parallels the modern State Route 136. Another trail, known as the Black Fox Trail, passed east-to-west just south of Rock Island.

In 1793, in the latter part of the Cherokee–American wars, a skirmish was fought at Rock Island between a small contingent of soldiers pursuing several Chickamaugas, who had reportedly stolen horses. The Tennessee historian J.G.M. Ramsey reported:

(Lt. Snoddy) pursued them to a large camp near the Rock Island ford of the Cany Fork, where he took much spoils. Evening coming on, he withdrew from the camp, about a mile, to an eminence, where he halted his men, and they lay on their arms all night.

The Chickamauga assaulted Snoddy's position the following day, but were beaten back.

Among the earliest settlers in Middle Tennessee settled at Rock Island in the late 1790s. They included William "Rock" Martin and Joseph Terry. In 1806, Rock Island became the county seat for the newly created White County and court was held in Terry's cabin. The new county encompassed all of what is now White and Warren Counties, and parts of the counties of Cannon, Coffee, DeKalb, Franklin, Grundy, Putnam, and Van Buren Counties. Rock Island was the county seat for three years. General John D. Rodgers, veteran of the War of 1812 and Seminole Wars owned a tavern and operated a ferry just above the island. Gen. Andrew Jackson presided over several sessions of the Tennessee Supreme Court here. The town by the river remained an important point along the Old Kentucky Road until the coming of the railroad in 1881.

The Webb Hotel (#100005145) a Craftsman style house constructed in 1909 to accommodate the rising demand for tourism in Rock Island, was known for its homestyle dinners on Sunday afternoons. The hotel was frequented by country music star and member of the Grand Ole Opry, Uncle Dave Macon. On March 27, 2020, the Webb Hotel was listed in the National Register of Historic Places.

== Geography ==
=== Recreation ===
Rock Island is home to Rock Island State Park & Great Falls Dam.

=== Climate ===
Rock Island has a humid subtropical climate (Cfa) under both the Köppen climate classification system and Trewartha with eight months (March through October) averaging at least 50 °F (10 °C), a July summer average of 77.1 °F (25.1 °C) and a January winter average of 38.5 °F (3.6 °C).

Climate data for Rock Island State Park (Tennessee) (1991–2020 normals, extremes 2006–present)
Month	Jan	Feb	Mar	Apr	May	Jun	Jul	Aug	Sep	Oct	Nov	Dec	Year
Record high °F (°C)	78 (26)	82 (28)	85 (29)	89 (32)	92 (33)	107 (42)	104 (40)	103 (39)	96 (36)	95 (35)	85 (29)	77 (25)	107 (42)
Mean maximum °F (°C)	67 (19)	72 (22)	79 (26)	85 (29)	88 (31)	93 (34)	94 (34)	93 (34)	90 (32)	84 (29)	76 (24)	70 (21)	96 (36)
Mean daily maximum °F (°C)	47.7 (8.7)	52.5 (11.4)	61.6 (16.4)	70.4 (21.3)	77.9 (25.5)	84.2 (29.0)	86.7 (30.4)	85.8 (29.9)	80.1 (26.7)	70.7 (21.5)	60.5 (15.8)	52.0 (11.1)	69.2 (20.7)
Daily mean °F (°C)	38.5 (3.6)	42.4 (5.8)	50.3 (10.2)	58.6 (14.8)	67.0 (19.4)	74.3 (23.5)	77.1 (25.1)	76.2 (24.6)	70.4 (21.3)	59.4 (15.2)	49.4 (9.7)	42.2 (5.7)	58.8 (14.9)
Mean daily minimum °F (°C)	29.3 (−1.5)	32.3 (0.2)	39.1 (3.9)	46.7 (8.2)	56.2 (13.4)	64.4 (18.0)	67.5 (19.7)	66.7 (19.3)	60.8 (16.0)	48.1 (8.9)	38.3 (3.5)	32.4 (0.2)	48.5 (9.2)
Mean minimum °F (°C)	11 (−12)	16 (−9)	23 (−5)	32 (0)	42 (6)	55 (13)	59 (15)	59 (15)	48 (9)	33 (1)	23 (−5)	18 (−8)	9 (−13)
Record low °F (°C)	−1 (−18)	3 (−16)	15 (−9)	22 (−6)	35 (2)	50 (10)	55 (13)	52 (11)	41 (5)	27 (−3)	15 (−9)	4 (−16)	−1 (−18)
Average precipitation inches (mm)	5.09 (129)	5.11 (130)	6.02 (153)	5.16 (131)	4.78 (121)	5.37 (136)	5.29 (134)	4.29 (109)	4.04 (103)	3.46 (88)	4.56 (116)	6.24 (158)	59.41 (1,509)
Source: NOAA
