= Centertown, Tennessee =

- Town
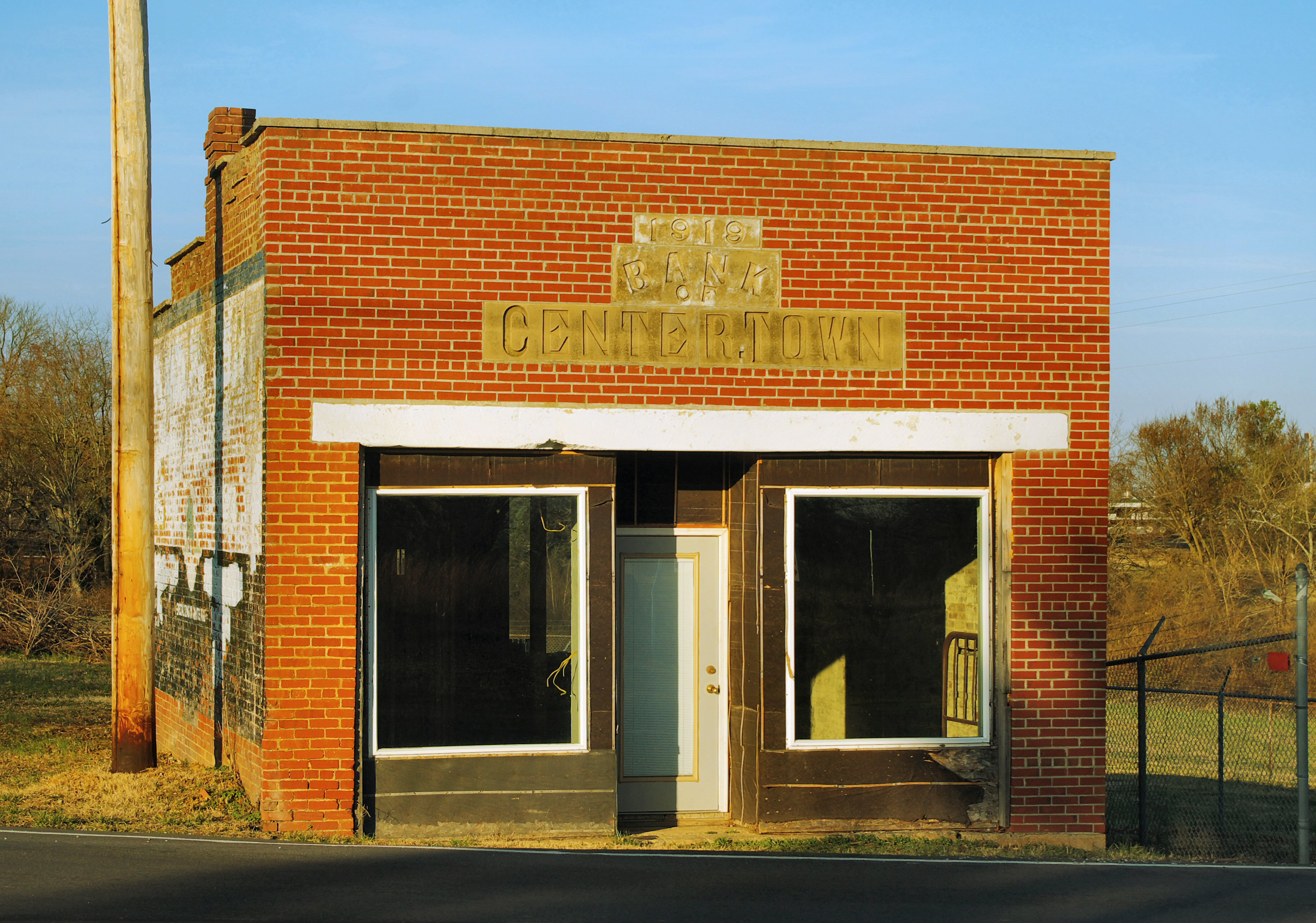
- Former Bank of Centertown building

- Location of Centertown in Warren County, Tennessee.
- Coordinates: 35°43′21″N 85°55′13″W
- Country: United States
- State: Tennessee
- County: Warren

Area
  - Total: 0.92 sq mi (2.39 km^{2})
  - Land: 0.92 sq mi (2.39 km^{2})
  - Water: 0 sq mi (0.00 km^{2})
- Elevation: 1,102 ft (336 m)

Population (2020)
  - Total: 297
  - Density: 321.3/sq mi (124.04/km^{2})
- Time zone: UTC-6 (Central (CST))
  - Summer (DST): UTC-5 (CDT)
- ZIP code: 37110
- Area code: 931
- FIPS code: 47-12380
- GNIS feature ID: 1305810

Centertown is a town in Warren County, Tennessee, United States. As of the 2020 census, Centertown had a population of 297.

== Geography ==
Centertown is located at 35°43′21″N 85°55′13″W.

According to the United States Census Bureau, the town has a total area of 0.9 square miles (2.3 km^{2}), all of it land.

== Demographics ==
Historical population
| Census | Pop. | Note | %± |
|---|---|---|---|
| 1960 | 169 | | — |
| 1970 | 181 | | 7.1% |
| 1980 | 300 | | 65.7% |
| 1990 | 332 | | 10.7% |
| 2000 | 257 | | −22.6% |
| 2010 | 243 | | −5.4% |
| 2020 | 297 | | 22.2% |

As of the census of 2000, there were 257 people, 102 households, and 73 families residing in the town. The population density was 279.0 inhabitants per square mile (107.7/km^{2}). There were 117 housing units at an average density of 127.0 per square mile (49.0/km^{2}). The racial makeup of the town was 97.28% White, 1.17% African American, and 1.56% from two or more races. Hispanic or Latino of any race were 0.78% of the population.

There were 102 households, out of which 33.3% had children under the age of 18 living with them, 64.7% were married couples living together, 2.9% had a female householder with no husband present, and 27.5% were non-families. 25.5% of all households were made up of individuals, and 9.8% had someone living alone who was 65 years of age or older. The average household size was 2.52 and the average family size was 3.04. In the town, the population was spread out, with 23.7% under the age of 18, 13.2% from 18 to 24, 23.0% from 25 to 44, 28.8% from 45 to 64, and 11.3% who were 65 years of age or older. The median age was 37 years. For every 100 females, there were 97.7 males. For every 100 females age 18 and over, there were 106.3 males.

The median income for a household in the town was $29,792, and the median income for a family was $44,250. Males had a median income of $35,625 versus $25,833 for females. The per capita income for the town was $15,157. About 5.2% of families and 11.7% of the population were below the poverty line, including 13.7% of those under the age of eighteen and 15.6% of those 65 or over.
