= Bone Cave =

Bone Cave or Bone Caves may refer to:

In Australia:

- Bone Cave (Tasmania), a cave in the Weld Valley, Tasmania

In the United Kingdom:

- Bone Cave, one of the caves at Dan yr Ogof in the Swansea Valley, Wales
- Bone Caves (Inchnadamph), caves in Inchnadamph, Sutherland, Scotland

In the United States:

- Big Bone Cave, a cave and natural area in Van Buren County, Tennessee
- Bone Cave, Tennessee, an unincorporated community in Van Buren County
- Bone Cave, an archaeological site along the Great Allegheny Passage near Cumberland, Maryland
