= The Caverns =

Tennessee underground music venue

Coordinates: 35.3316°N 85.8249°W

The Caverns is a music and recreation attraction located in Grundy County, Tennessee, at the base of the Cumberland Plateau.

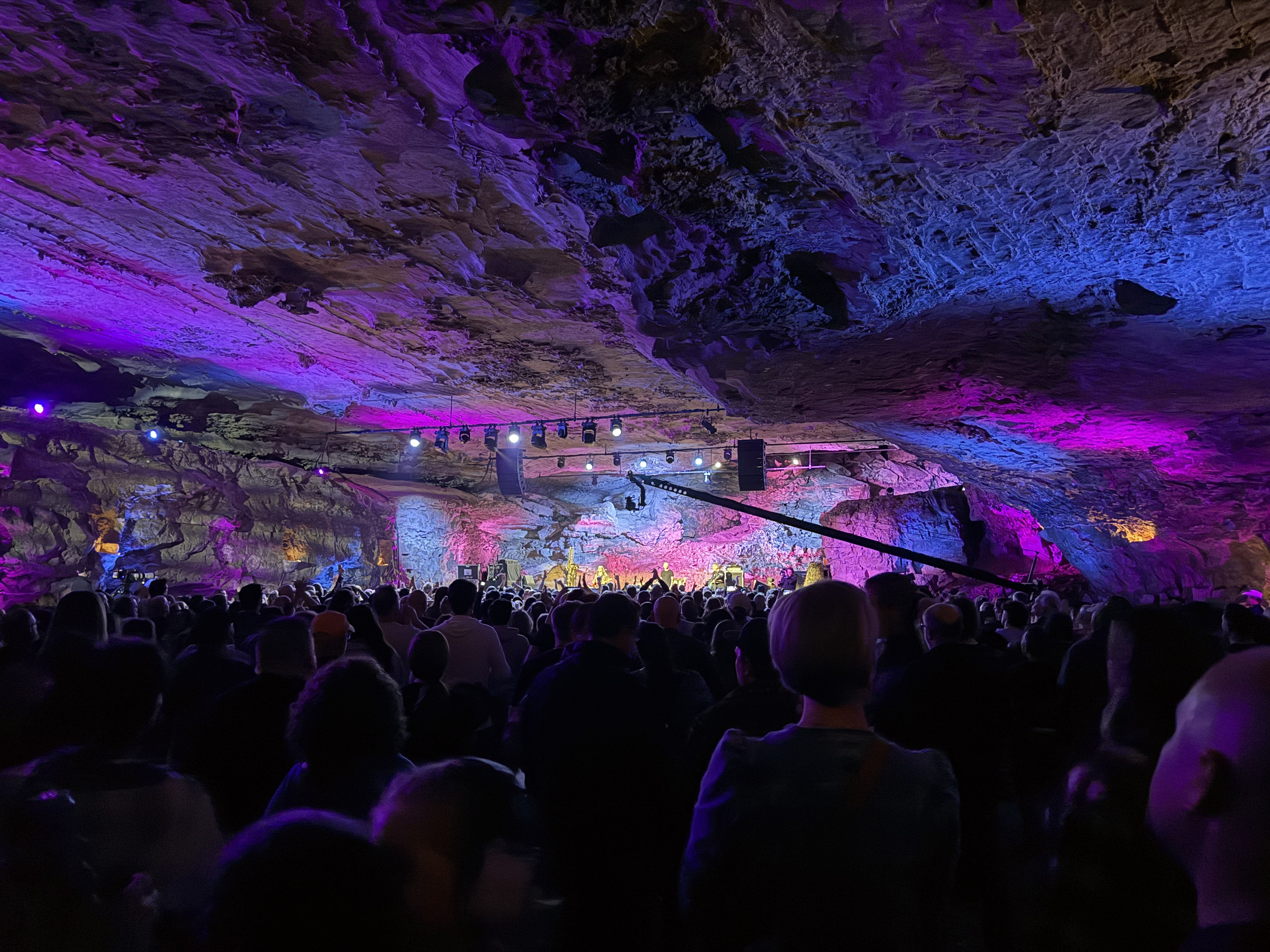
The Caverns underground concert venue during a PBS taping of The Caverns Sessions.

The grounds feature two main caves, Big Mouth Cave and Big Room Cave, with the underground concert venue located in Big Mouth Cave. Outside of the caves, the attraction also includes an outdoor amphitheater.

The Caverns hosts a wide variety of performances, including concerts across multiple musical genres, comedy shows, and podcasts. Visitors can explore the caves on guided tours and stay overnight at the campground, which includes tent sites, RV sites with electric hookups, and yurt accommodations. The property also features The Caverns Tavern and a gift shop.

== Origins and purpose ==
The Caverns’ underground music venue and gift shop opened in 2018. The venue was founded by Todd Mayo, who previously created Bluegrass Underground at Cumberland Caverns, and was designed to continue presenting underground concerts in a dedicated subterranean setting. Billy Strings was the first artist to headline the underground venue on March 24, 2018.

The doors of The Caverns feature an inscription in Sequoyah script, translating to: “Welcome to The Caverns where the great spirit brings all people together through music.”

== Stages ==
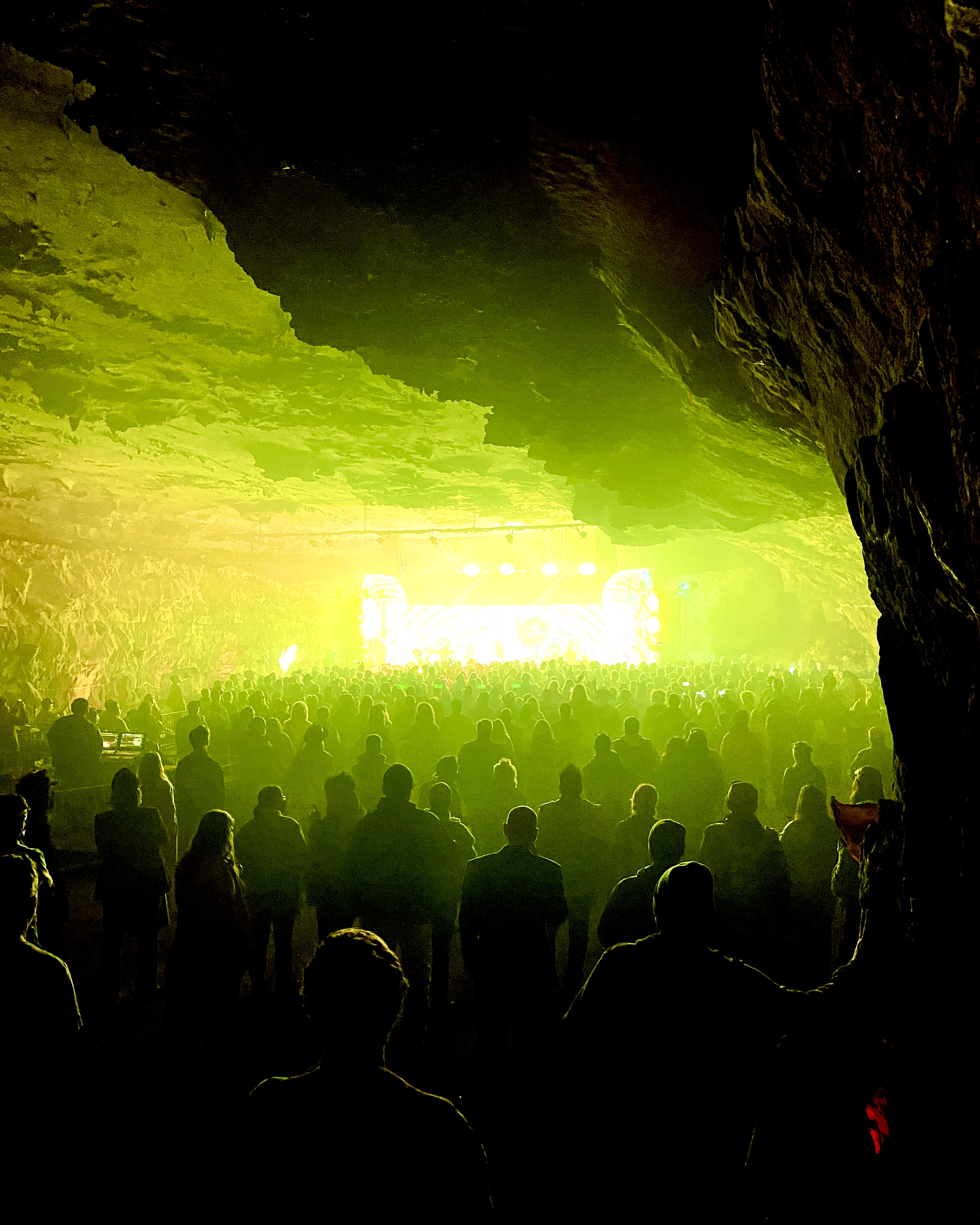
View of The Caverns underground concert venue inside Big Mouth Cave. Lighting gives a yellow hue, highlighting the cave's rock formations.

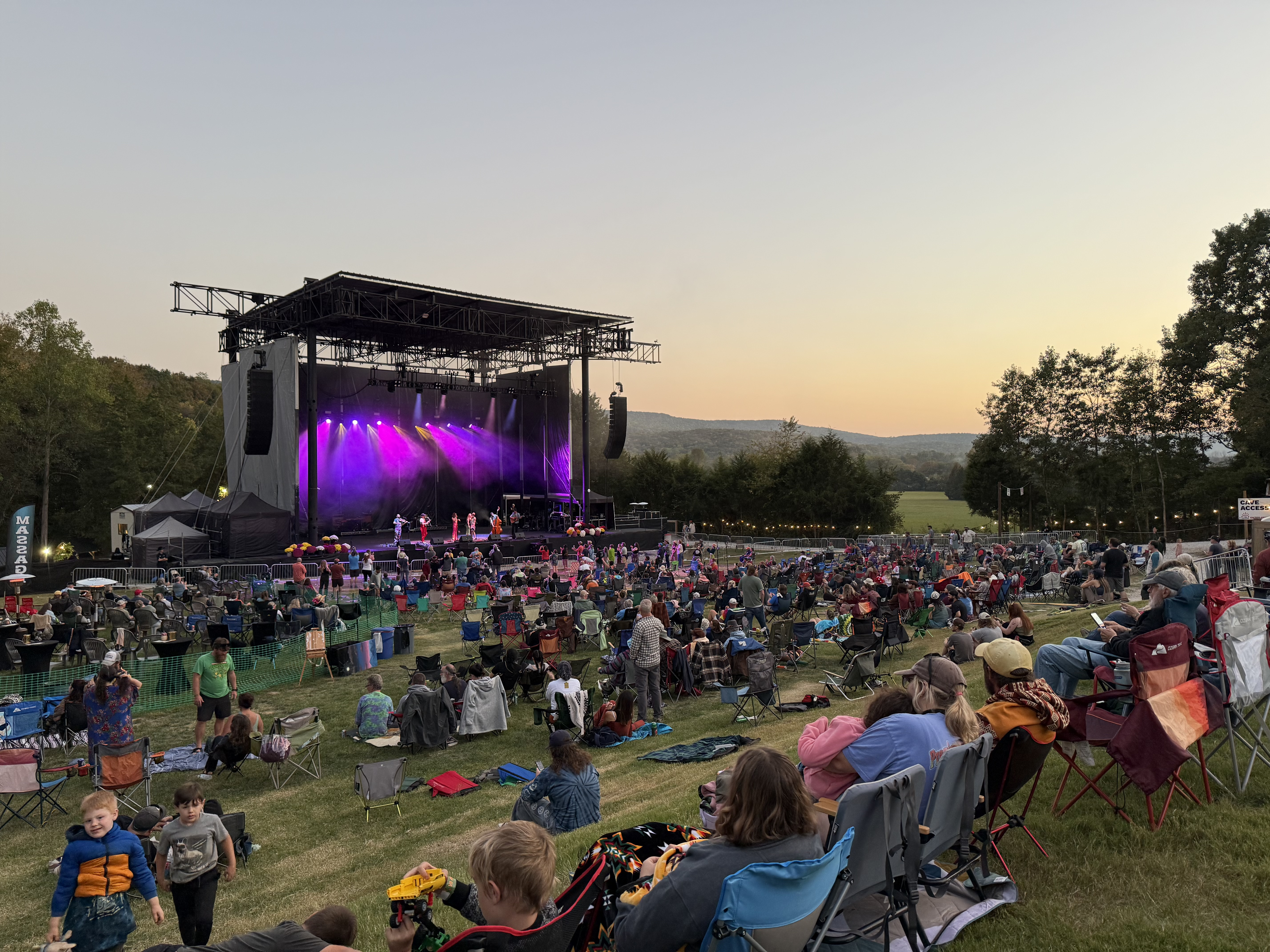
The Caverns Amphitheater in Grundy County, Tennessee, at sundown.

The Caverns’ underground music venue, located in Big Mouth Cave, can host up to 850 guests for seated shows and 1,200 for standing-room-only events. The subterranean venue features sound and lighting systems, restrooms, and a bar. The stage is roughly 30 by 20 feet with a 20 foot ceiling. The cave environment provides good natural acoustics, along with a sound system designed around the venue's unique structure. It includes six QSC WideLine 10 dual 10-inch line arrays and two JBL VerTec 4880 subwoofers powered by 16 Crown I-Tech 12000HD amplifiers.

On October 8, 2020, amid the COVID-19 pandemic, The Caverns introduced The Caverns Amphitheater, an outdoor venue designed for socially-distanced concerts, with Jason Isbell & The 400 Unit as its inaugural performers. The amphitheater initially featured pod seating and later reopened on June 25, 2022, as a full 6,000-capacity venue, celebrating its grand reopening with headliners Old Crow Medicine Show.

== Notable performers and festivals ==
Since opening, The Caverns has hosted a variety of performers. Musical artists who have appeared at The Caverns include Brandi Carlile, Ethel Cain, King Gizzard & the Lizard Wizard, Marcus King, Ricky Skaggs, Sierra Ferrell, Slowdive, The Avett Brothers, The Red Clay Strays, Turnpike Troubadours, Violent Femmes, and "Weird Al" Yankovic.

The venue has also hosted comedy performances, including Bill Burr.

Each fall, The Caverns hosts its signature festival, CaveFest, a camping festival featuring bluegrass and Americana roots music, with performances at both the underground venue and the amphitheater. Bluegrass Today calls CaveFest “one of the best” festivals in its genre.

== Caves and tours ==
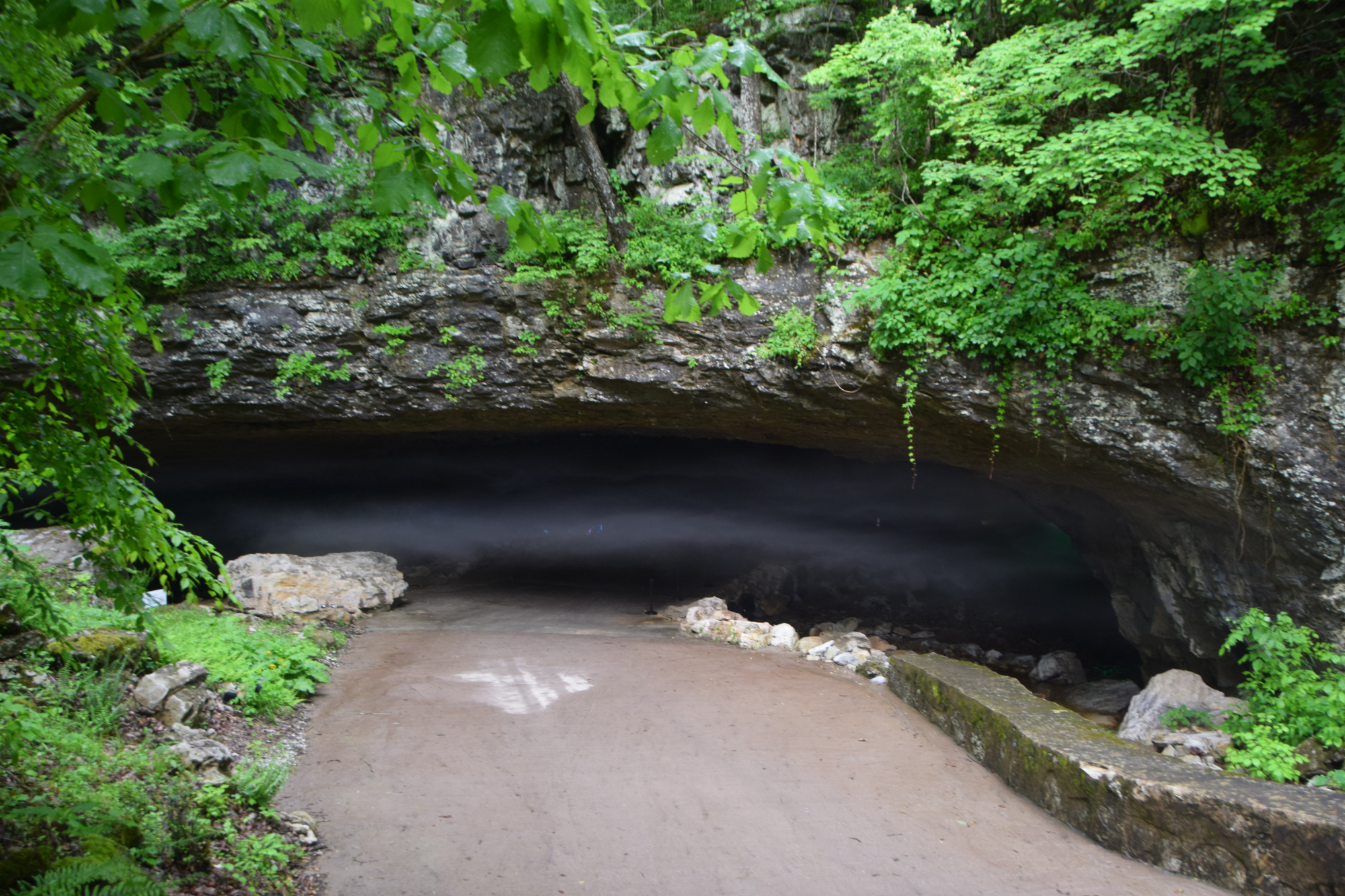
Entrance to Big Mouth Cave, showing the cave mouth and surrounding rock formations.

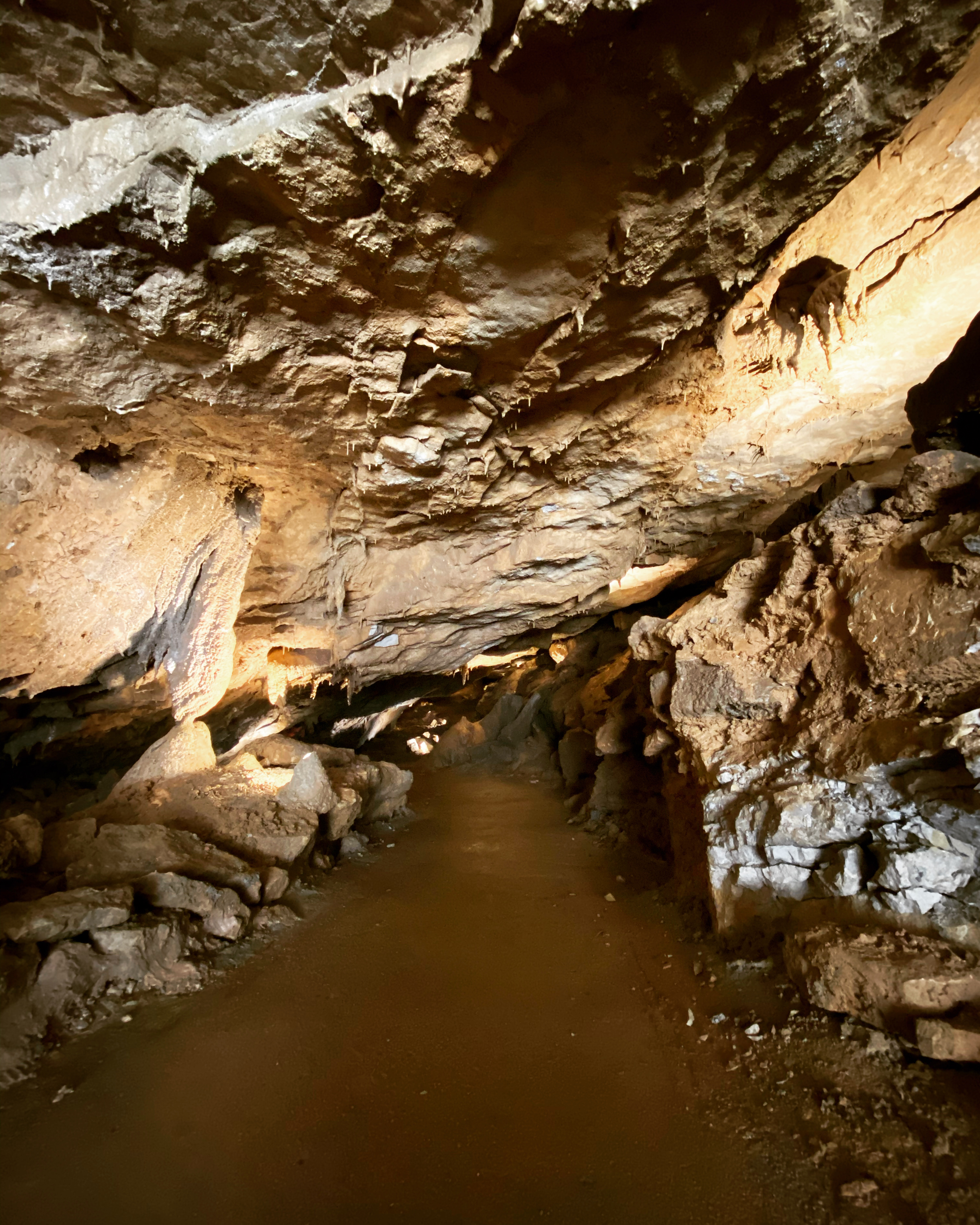
Formations inside Big Room Cave at The Caverns in Grundy County, Tennessee.

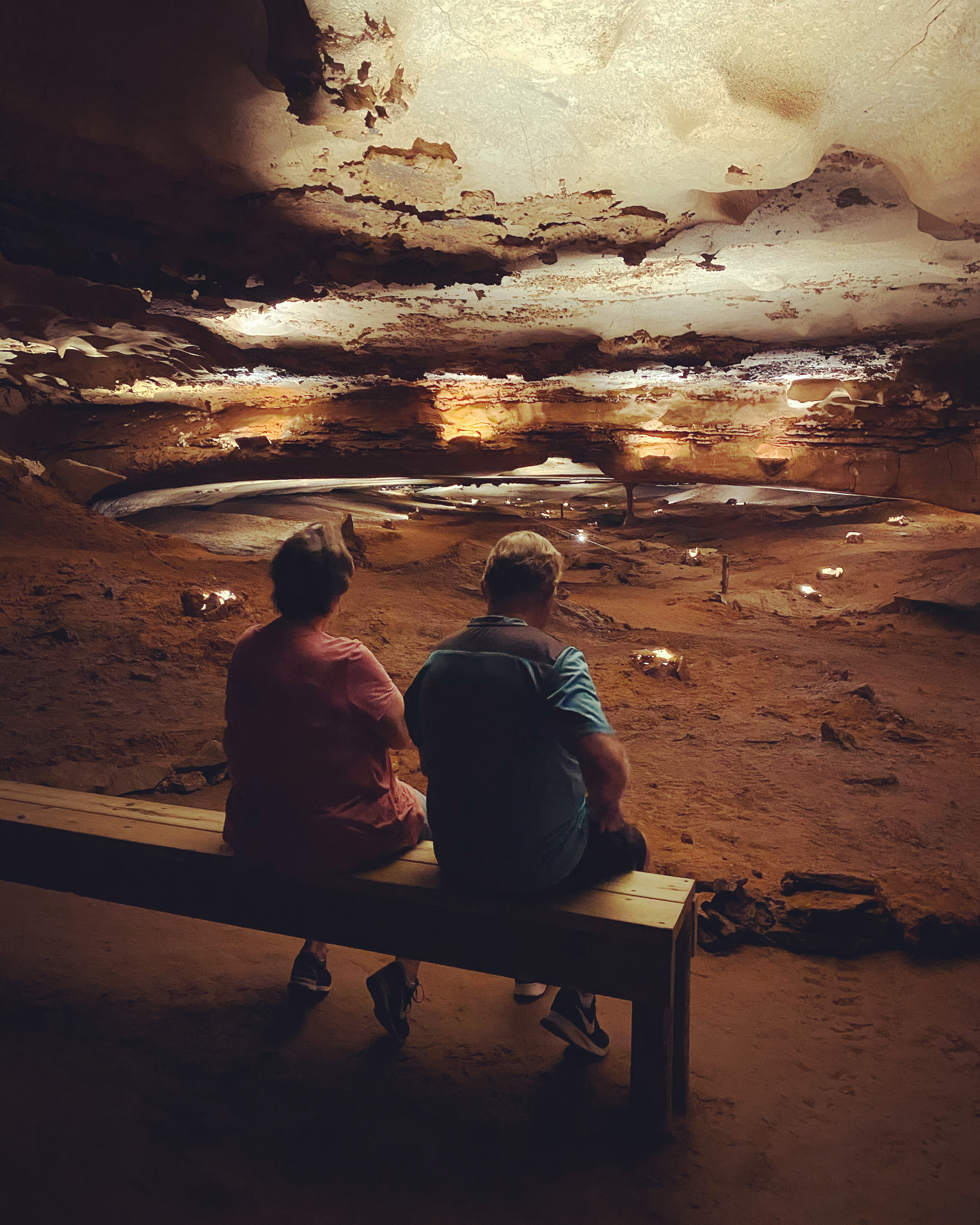
Visitors sitting on a bench during a guided tour inside Big Room Cave.

The property features two primary caves: Big Room Cave and Big Mouth Cave. Guided cave tours began on July 4, 2020, covering both caves. Adventure tours provide more challenging underground experiences, led by experienced guides, with all necessary safety equipment provided, including helmets, knee pads, and lamps.

== Camp Caverns ==
Camp Caverns is a residential program for children ages 8–13 held each summer at The Caverns. Campers stay in yurts and participate in a variety of activities, including guided cave tours, hiking, ziplining, paddleboarding, arts and crafts, and archery. Evening programs include talent shows and movie nights in the cave. Some overnight experiences take place in The Caverns underground music venue. Activities are organized in group-based challenges and structured programs.

== Cultural significance ==
The Caverns has received recognition from several publications and organizations. In 2018, BuzzFeed included the venue in its list “18 of the Coolest Concert Venues in the United States.” In 2022, readers of Garden & Gun named The Caverns as Favorite Southern Music Venue. In 2025, the Academy of Country Music awarded The Caverns Theater of the Year.

The venue also hosts The Caverns Sessions series on PBS, which has earned Emmy recognition for its subterranean performances.
