= Bratcher =

Bratcher is a surname. Notable people with the surname include:

- Clifton Rhodes Bratcher (1913–1977), American judge
- Joe Bratcher (1898–1977), American baseball player
- Kevin Bratcher (born 1961), American politician
- Steve Bratcher, American politician

== See also ==
- Bratchers Crossroads, Tennessee
