= Chris Volpe =

American songwriter and folk musician (1980–2021)

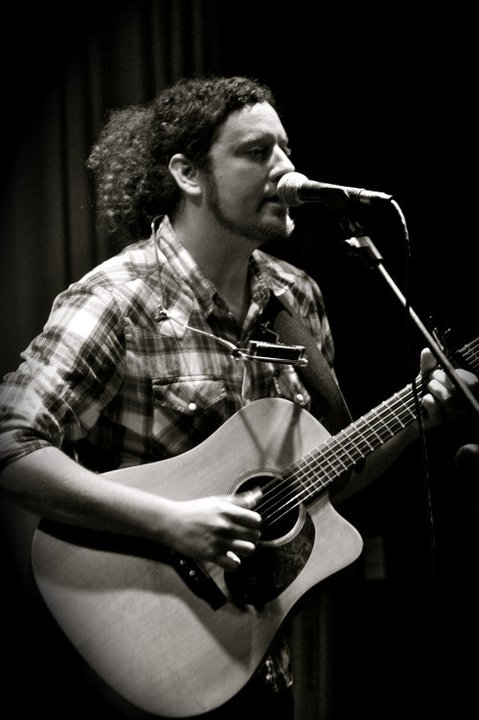
- Volpe performing in 2011

Background information
- Born: Christopher Robert Volpe; August 29, 1980; Cleveland, Ohio, US
- Origin: Abruzzi, Italy
- Died: June 29, 2021 (aged 40) Lakewood, Ohio
- Genres: Folk, rock, bluegrass, country
- Occupations: Musician, songwriter
- Instruments: Vocals, guitar, banjo, harmonica, bass, piano, percussion, pedal steel
- Years active: 1999–present
- Labels: Independent, Bug Digital, Abydos, Lightning Bolt Productions, Pedal Steel Laboratory
- Website: music.apple.com/us/artist/chris-volpe/189756200

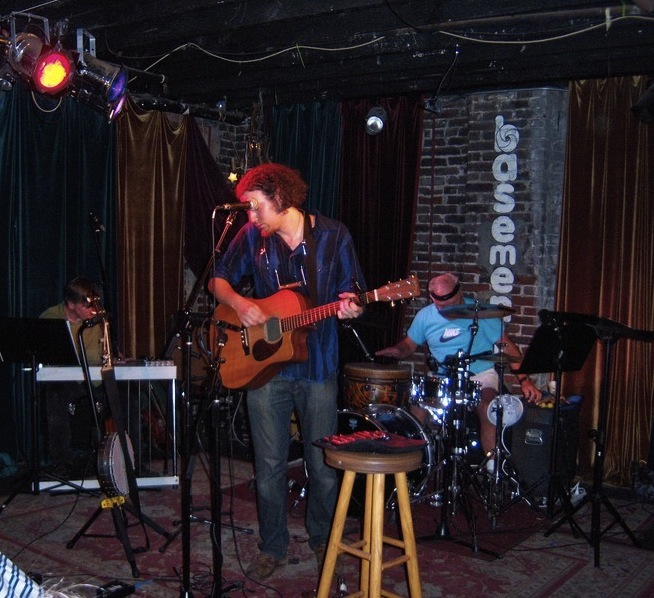
Volpe performing in 2009

Christopher Robert Volpe (August 29, 1980 – June 29, 2021) was an American songwriter and folk musician. Starting in 2006, he won more than twenty international songwriting awards including an Independent Music Award for Best Folk Album.

== Education ==
After graduating from high school, Volpe attended Kent State University where he studied philosophy and mass media. Upon earning a bachelor's degree and busking in Europe for six months, he moved to Washington, D.C. and then New York City, where he spent a year honing his songwriting in the New York City Subway and in clubs such as the Sidewalk Cafe, before again relocating to the San Francisco Bay Area. In 2007 Volpe moved to Nashville, and then he moved back to his hometown of Cleveland in 2010.

== Career ==
Volpe won three hours of studio time when he was awarded "best song" by the West Coast Songwriting Association at the Sweetwater Saloon in October 2004. He used the studio time to record fifteen original songs in one take (guitar, vocals, harmonica) during the three-hour block, which was then released as an album titled Refugee Blues. The album garnered him numerous awards, including an Independent Music Award for "Best Folk Album of the Year," and the "Singer/Songwriter Award" from London-based "We Are Listening".

Volpe then continued touring the California coast and performed at numerous festivals including the San Francisco Folk Festival, the Hyperactive Music Festival in Albuquerque, New Mexico, and the SXSW Music Conference in Austin, TX. He was featured on the National Public Radio Open Mic series and much of his music was and has since been included on PBS's Roadtrip Nation documentary series.

In 2007, encouraged by several friends including fiddle player Alex DePue, Volpe moved to Nashville, Tennessee to explore the country songwriting industry, but quickly changed course when he found inspiration in the city's embedded bluegrass world and burgeoning indie rock scene.

In 2008, after completing work on his next release, Volpe spent two months on tour as the instrument tech for Steve Earle and Allison Moorer, during which he was onstage for performances by Jakob Dylan, Gillian Welch, Levon Helm, Bob Dylan and Conor Oberst as well as Earle and Moorer. He has appeared at the Bristol Rhythm & Roots Reunion, Louisville's Forecastle Festival, and WSM radio's Bluegrass Underground series, as well as a performance during the inaugural season of Nashville's popular Music City Roots series, which also aired worldwide on WSM radio.

In 2009, Volpe released Shipwrecked!, which showcases a larger, experimental sound he called "surrealist folk." On the record, Volpe worked with Bob Dylan's bandmate, Donnie Herron; percussionist Kenny Malone, Jeff Coffin, and bassist/cellist Bryn Davies. In addition, the performances were recorded by bluegrass engineer Phil Harris, who received Grammy Award praise for his work on Doc Watson's Grammy winning instrumental album in 2006.

Late in 2010, Volpe relocated to his hometown of Cleveland, Ohio, to complete the writing and recording of Up, Up, & Awry. His list of awards and accolades is extensive. Volpe, who has had no formal musical training, played guitar, harmonica, banjo, piano, and drums among other instruments.

On June 29, 2021, Volpe died at the age of 40.

== Legacy ==
The Christopher R. Volpe '95 Music Lab at Volpe's alma mater, Incarnate Word Academy, was dedicated in October 2022.

== Discography ==
- 2006 Refugee Blues
- 2008 Elevator EP
- 2009 Shipwrecked!
- 2012 Up, Up & Awry

== Awards ==
- 2013 International Acoustic Music Awards- Runner Up Award- Best Folk Song- "World Isn't Worth It"
- 2012 Independent Music Awards- Top Five Finalist- Best Protest Song- "Ain't No Politician"
- 2011 USA Songwriting Competition Winner- Top Ten Finalist- Best Folk Song- "Peace of Mind"
- 2011 International Acoustic Music Awards Winner- Top 10 Best Folk/Roots Song- "Why Did I Change My Tune?"
- 2011 International Esongwriter Competition Winner- Top 10 Winner- "Don't Go"
- 2010 Billboard World Song Contest -Honorable Mention Award- "Salvations Round the Bend"
- 2010 Billboard World Song Contest -Honorable Mention Award- "Dusty Bibles"
- 2010 Music City Song Contest- Red Ridge Entertainment- Top 3 Finalist- "Don't Go"
- 2009 Gary Allen Nashville Songwriting Contest- Top 4 Finalist- "Steamroller Rain"
- 2008 International Winner of the Lyric Writer Awards- "Dusty Bibles"
- 2007 Great American Song Contest (9th Annual)- Lyrical Finalist- "Dusty Bibles"
- 2007 Unisong 11th Annual Songwriting Contest-Local United Network to Combat Hunger- Honorable Mention- "The Bandwagon Farm"
- 2007 Unisong 11th Annual Songwriting Contest-Local United Network to Combat Hunger- Top Finalist- "Shoes"
- 2007 Song of the Year Awards- International Finalist- "Shoes"
- 2006 Independent Music Awards- International Winner- Album of the Year/Singer-Songwriter- "Refugee Blues"
- 2006 Singer/Songwriter Awards- We Are Listening, London- International Winner- "Shoes"
- 2006 John Lennon Songwriting Contest (Round I)- International Best Folk Song Finalist- "Where the Rubber Meets the Road"
- 2006 John Lennon Songwriting Contest (Round II)- International Best Folk Song Finalist- "Shoes"
- 2006 Billboard 14th Annual World Songwriting Contest- Honorable Mention Award- "Shoes"
- 2006 Billboard 14th Annual World Songwriting Contest- Honorable Mention Award- "Jersey Sun"
- 2006 USA Songwriting Competition- International Finalist & Honorable Mention Award- "Shoes"
- 2006 International Song Prize.com Winner- International Best Folk Song Honorable Mention Award- "Shoes"
- 2006 International Songwriting Competition- Semi-finalist- "Albuquerque" (Instrumental)
- 2004 The West Coast Songwriting Association- Best Song Award (Live Performance)- "Shoes"
