= Campaign, Tennessee =

- Unincorporated community
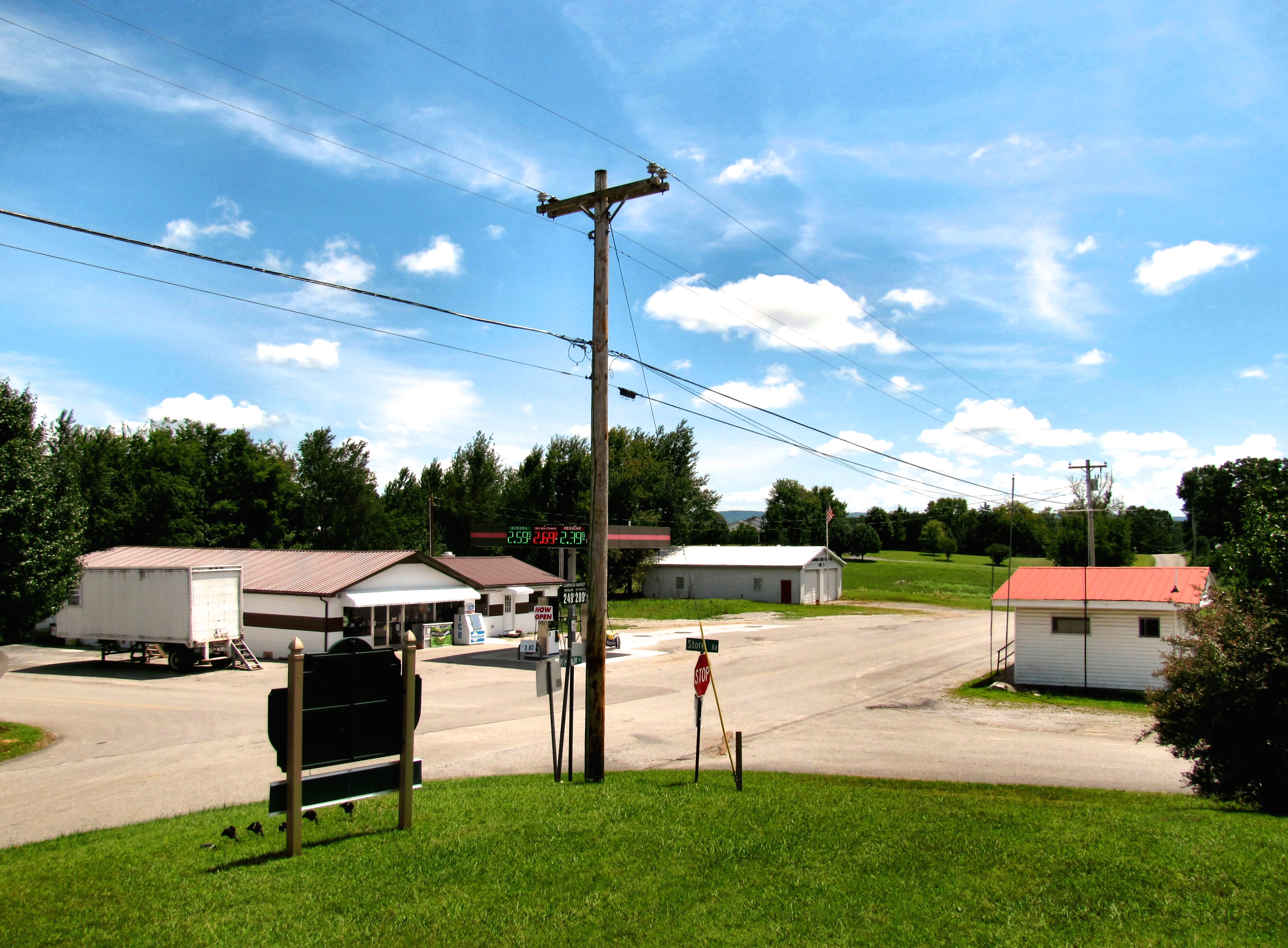
- Intersection of Pine Bluff Road, Maple Drive, and Store Road

- Location within Tennessee Location within the United States
- Coordinates: 35°46′15″N 85°37′43″W
- Country: United States
- State: Tennessee
- County: Warren
- Elevation: 968 ft (295 m)
- Time zone: UTC-6 (Central (CST))
  - Summer (DST): UTC-5 (CDT)
- ZIP code: 38550
- Area code: 931
- GNIS feature ID: 1305638

Campaign is an unincorporated community in Warren County, Tennessee, United States. It lies just off U.S. Route 70S southwest of Rock Island and northeast of McMinnville. Its ZIP code is 38550. The Collins River passes to the northwest of Campaign, while the Rocky River passes to the east.

The community is named for Joseph Campain (spelled without the "g"), an early settler who operated a store along the railroad tracks in the area during the latter half of the 19th century. It was initially known as "Campaign Stop," but later shortened to "Campaign."
