= Music City Roots =

Radio and television show

Music City Roots is a live radio show, created and produced by John Walker and Todd Mayo. The show is owned and its international trademark is held by Heng Dai Media, LLC, a Tennessee corporation. The television show is distributed via American Public Television, and airs on PBS affiliate stations across the US and Canada.

Initially born as a radio show, Music City Roots is now carried by flagship station WMOT, 89.5 FM in Murfreesboro-Nashville, TN. The syndicated broadcast is carried by stations across the US. Music City Roots "on the road" has been filmed and broadcast from multiple locations, including Belfast, Northern Ireland and Tamworth, Australia.

Heng Dai Media's Roots Radio brand and musical format has been contractually licensed by WMOT radio.

== History ==
The show was first conceived by John Walker while working at WSM Radio in 2007. The news came that the Grand Ole Opry was planning to cancel the late Saturday show due to low attendance. Walker postulated that the lack of late show attendance was due to inattention to the growing trend toward Americana music, and therefore had become less relevant to the younger, more diverse music fan. He began pitching the idea of a show to focus on the less commercial, yet highly gifted artists playing music that was authentically inspired by American roots tradition.

The idea quickly took hold with sponsors and artists, and was embraced by the press. The original concept was to be named "Back to the Barn", a metaphorical reference to a return to the early days of the Opry, originally called the Saturday Night Barn Dance. While similar in that it was a live radio broadcast with a traditional announcer at a podium, it added contextual relevance by also including journalist-interviewer Craig Havighurst, who had written a historical biography of WSM's influence on Music City called Air Castle of the South. The show was to have a third, musical host - Americana icon Jim Lauderdale.

During this time, Walker connected with long-time friend Todd Mayo, who had begun paid airing of Bluegrass Underground on WSM, a show that he created to air from a cave inside Cumberland Caverns in McMinnville, TN. Todd fell in love with the show concept, as its core values aligned with an idea that he also had for a musical variety radio show. He signed on to book artists and co-produce the show with Walker. The show was to originate from the then-financially challenged Wild Horse Saloon on Saturdays, immediately following the early Opry show.

The economic downturn of 2008, along with some dissension from Opry management caused Gaylord Entertainment, then owner of WSM, Wildhorse Saloon and the Grand Ole Opry, to cancel plans to air the show. Walker and Mayo immediately agreed to form an independent production company and continue plans to produce the show. The company was called Heng Dai Media, LLC, named for their shared love of HBO series Deadwood; an analogy for the Wild West's similarities to the post-digital music industry.

They named their new show Music City Roots, and signed a one-year deal with WSM to purchase air time for the show and underwrite costs through corporate sponsorships. As two of the cities top media sales executives, they quickly built a roster of support. Mayo coined the phrase, "A community of fans, bands and brands", and the two built a strategy for digital distribution and pioneering use of social media to connect the show to a worldwide niche audience.

Nashville music aficionado and restaurateur Tom Morales had recently inspired a group of investors to save the aging Loveless Cafe and Motel from extinction at its remote location at the foot of the Natchez Trace Parkway. The newly remodeled Loveless Cafe had built an event barn on their complex. Morales reached out to Music City Roots producers, and they negotiated a deal to broadcast the weekly show from the brand new Loveless Barn. It is here that the shows double-entendre announcer opening line, "From the edge of Music City" was coined. Both geographically and musically, the new show clearly represented the leading edge of what was to become a worldwide movement.

After securing Emmylou Harris to headline the inaugural show, Music City Roots launched its first episode from the Loveless Barn on October 14, 2009. The critical and audience acclaim was immediate, and the series was off and running. The first season featured performances from Sam Bush, Mike Farris and the McCrary Sisters, Charlie Louvin and many others, spanning the range of emerging to legendary artists, both young and old.

As the show neared the end of its one-year agreement with WSM, Gaylord Entertainment's senior management communicated to Heng Dai Media that they would not renew the contract to air Music City Roots unless they could purchase the show, or a minimum 51% controlling interest. Walker and Mayo declined, and over the next several years signed agreements with various Nashville radio stations to air the show.

In 2010, Heng Dai Media purchased video equipment and began streaming the show in HD over the internet. The first webcast in July 2010 featured Brandi Carlile, and immediately began garnering a large audience to watch the filming of a live radio show.

In 2013, local PBS affiliate Nashville Public Television (NPT-8) became the flagship station to present Music City Roots on public television, with an annual 12-episode series distributed by American Public Television.

In 2016, Heng Dai Media contracted with WMOT radio, a 100,000-watt FM station owned by Middle Tennessee State University, to become the flagship station for Music City Roots. In addition to the show, Heng Dai Media contracted to curate programming and content under their trademarked Roots Radio brand. In addition to licensing their library of recorded live performances, they built the formatted playlist and consulted in building audience and revenue to the powerful but low-rated station. In the first quarter of broadcasting under the new format (Fall 2016) WMOT's Neilsen audience rank went from 43rd (last) to top 20 in the Nashville Metro designated market area.

Home Venue for the broadcast have been The Loveless Barn from 2009 to 2015, The Factory at Franklin from 2015 to 2017, and in Madison, Tennessee on the site of Amqui Station, a museum founded by Johnny Cash to preserve the 1910-era passenger train station.
