= Shady Rest (disambiguation) =

Shady Rest is a protected area in Illinois.

Shady Rest may also refer to:

- Shady Rest Golf and Country Club, Scotch Plains, New Jersey, United States
- Shady Rest, Warren County, Tennessee, United States, an unincorporated community
- Shady Rest, a neighborhood of Connellsville Township, Pennsylvania, United States
- Shady Rest, an alternate name for the James Monroe Thompson House, near Saxapahaw, North Carolina, United States, a house on the National Register of Historic Places
- Shady Rest Home, an alternate name for the Marshall County Infirmary, Center Township, Indiana, United States, a farm complex on the National Register of Historic Places
- Shady Rest, a Prohibition-era fortified speakeasy built by Charles Birger, a bootlegger
- Shady Rest Hotel, fictional setting of the American sitcom Petticoat Junction
