= Berea, Tennessee =

Berea, Tennessee may refer to:

- Berea, Giles County, Tennessee
- Berea, Warren County, Tennessee
