= Bone Cave, Tennessee =

Unincorporated community in Tennessee, US

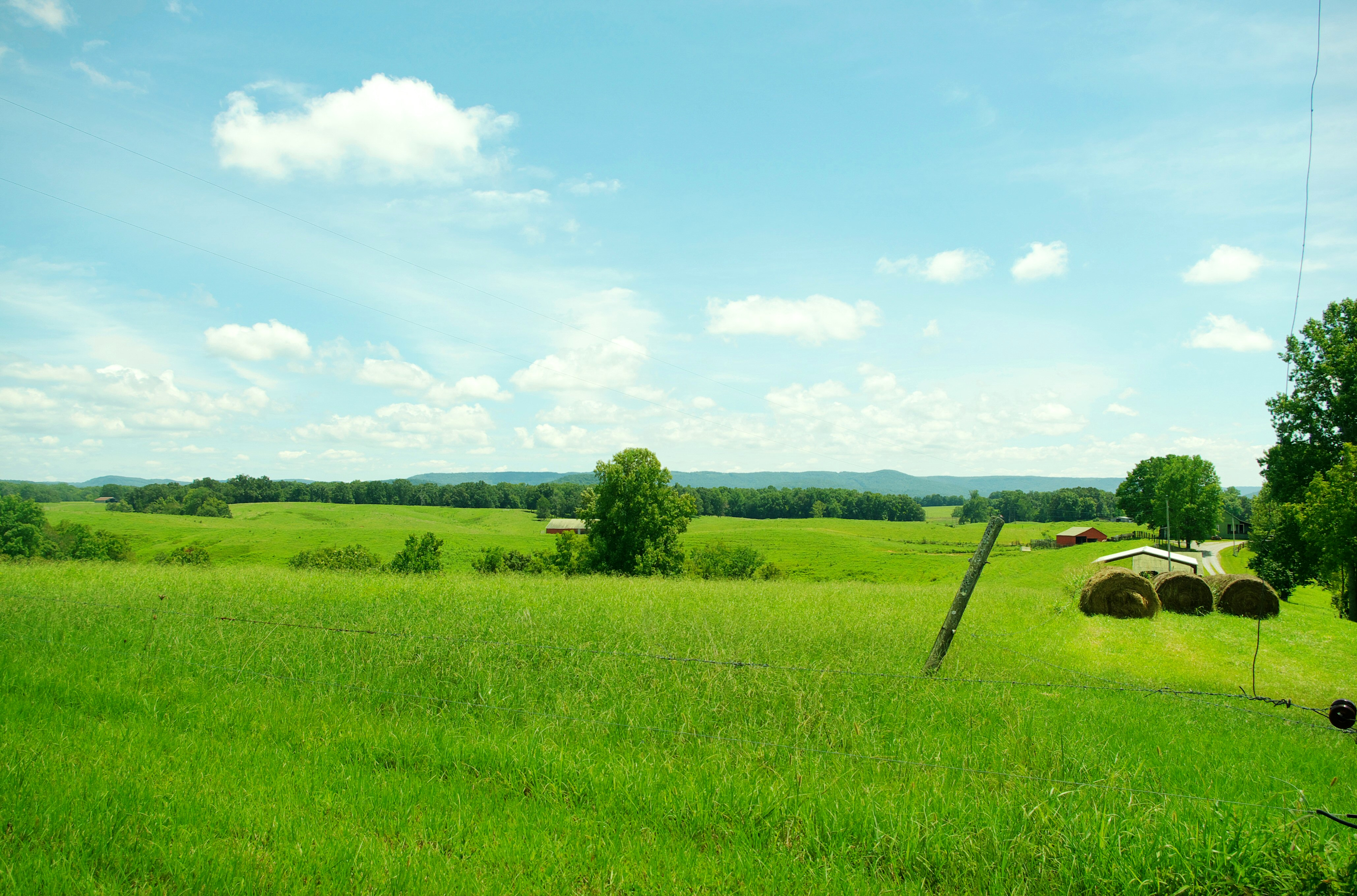
Farm in the Bone Cave area

Bone Cave (also Big Bone Cave or Bonecave) is an unincorporated community in Van Buren County, Tennessee, United States. It lies just off U.S. Route 70S northwest of Spencer and southeast of Rock Island. Its elevation is 965 feet (294 m), and it is located at 35°46′30″N 85°35′6″W (35.7750675, -85.5849782). The Rocky River passes through the community. The various forms of its names led the Board on Geographic Names to decide on the official form of the community's name in 1895.

The community is named for nearby Big Bone Cave, one of the most famous and historic caves in Tennessee. Big Bone Cave was named for the discovery of a giant ground sloth skeleton in 1811 during the mining of cave dirt to be processed for saltpeter.

A post office called Bone Cave was established in 1866, and remained in operation until it was discontinued in 1977.
