= Hubbard's Cave =

Cave and natural area in Warren Country, Tennessee

Coordinates: 35.611°N 85.689°W

Hubbard's Cave is a cave and 50-acre (0.2 km²) natural area located 10 miles (16 km) southeast of McMinnville in Warren County, Tennessee. It is owned by the Tennessee chapter of The Nature Conservancy.

Hubbard's Cave is ecologically significant because it serves as a hibernaculum for two Federally endangered bat species, the gray bat (Myotis grisescens) and the Indiana bat (Myotis sodalis). The cave is known to be the largest gray bat hibernaculum in Tennessee with a population of over 500,000 gray bats. Five other bat species also hibernate in the cave. Hibernating bats are extremely sensitive to disturbance during the hibernation period. Since they have stored up just enough energy to survive through the winter, rousing them forces the use of these precious stores. In many instances the bats will be unable to survive the winter. Consequently, the cave entrances have been gated to prevent disturbance of the bats during their hibernation. The cave consists of three entrances (branches) at the base of a large sinkhole. It is surrounded by a mesic oak-hickory forest.

In addition to its biological importance, Hubbard's Cave has played an extensive role in human history and prehistory. During the Civil War, the cave was heavily mined for saltpeter to produce gunpowder. The west passage in particular is littered with evidence of this historic human use. Researchers are still working to record all of the signatures found on the walls of this passage. Unfortunately, many of the historic signatures have been covered by the spray paint of modern graffiti caused by vandals. Artifacts from the saltpeter mining works have been found scattered throughout this passage, including a remarkable ladder that was burned and nearly destroyed by vandals in 1997. Prehistoric human use is also evident in Hubbard's Cave. Most notable are the pieces of cane torches found throughout the west passage. Incredibly preserved because of the dry conditions, these fragments have been carbon dated to be around 2,000 years old.
