= Irving College, Tennessee =

- Unincorporated community
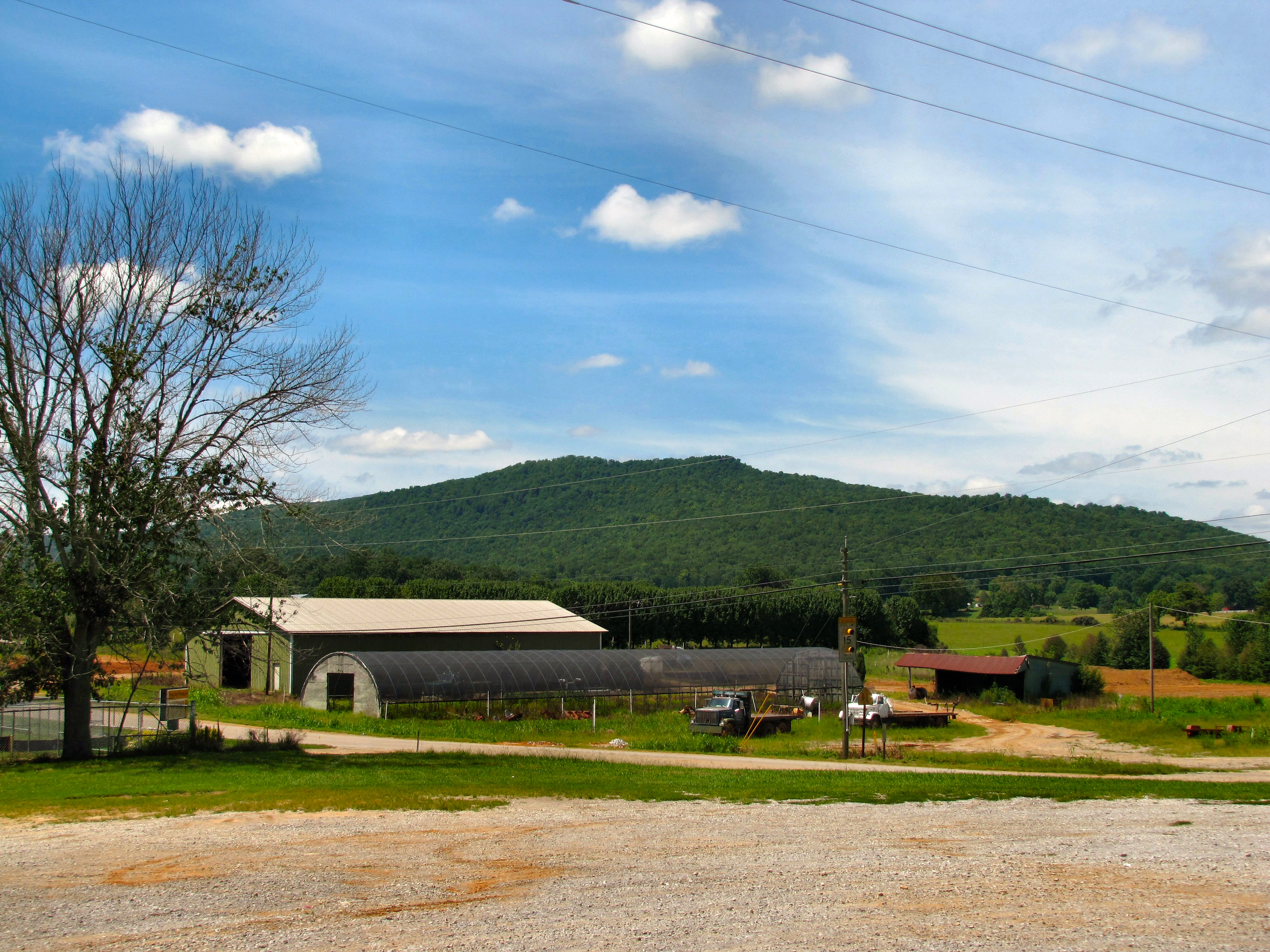
- Farm in Irving College

- Location within Tennessee Location within the United States
- Coordinates: 35°35′02″N 85°42′47″W
- Country: United States
- State: Tennessee
- County: Warren
- Elevation: 945 ft (288 m)
- Time zone: UTC-6 (Central (CST))
  - Summer (DST): UTC-5 (CDT)
- ZIP code: 37110
- Area code: 931
- GNIS feature ID: 1289058

Irving College is an unincorporated community in Warren County, Tennessee, United States. It is concentrated around the intersection of Tennessee State Route 56 (Beersheba Highway), Dry Creek Road, and Hills Creek Road, south of McMinnville. Irving College Elementary School is located within the community, and numerous plant nurseries operate in the vicinity. The Collins River passes just east of the community, and ridges that mark the outer edges of the Cumberland Plateau surround the community to the east, south, and west.

The community is named after a college that served the area from 1838 to 1890. The college was named in honor of Washington Irving.
