= Van Buren County, Tennessee =

County in Tennessee, United States

- County
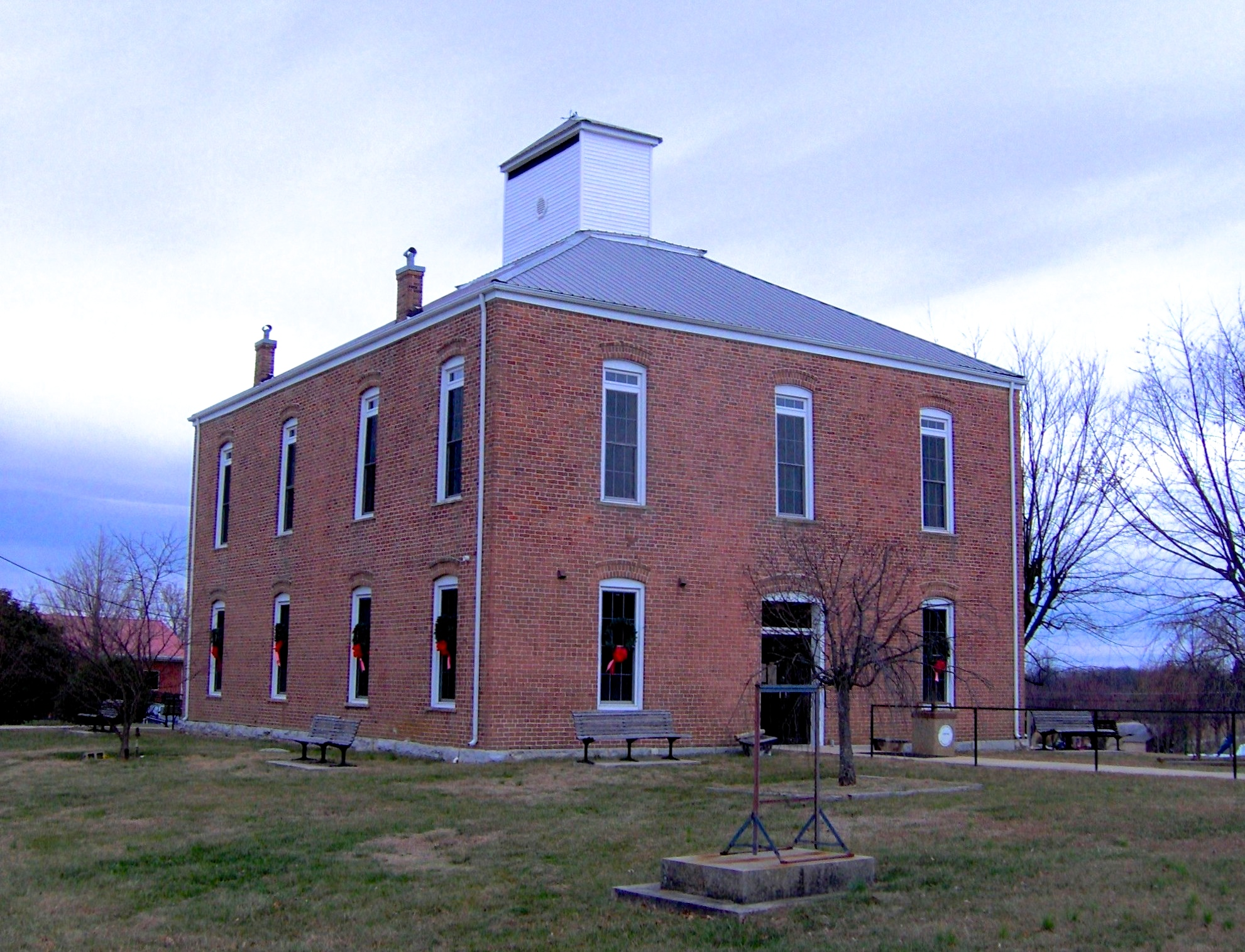
- Van Buren County Courthouse in Spencer

- Flag

- Location within the U.S. state of Tennessee
- Coordinates: 35°41′N 85°28′W
- Country: United States
- State: Tennessee
- Founded: January 3, 1840
- Named for: Martin Van Buren
- Seat: Spencer
- Largest town: Spencer

Area
  - Total: 275 sq mi (710 km^{2})
  - Land: 273 sq mi (710 km^{2})
  - Water: 1.1 sq mi (2.8 km^{2}) 0.4%

Population (2020)
  - Total: 6,168
  - Estimate (2025): 6,874 ▲
  - Density: 24.5/sq mi (9.5/km^{2})
- Time zone: UTC−6 (Central)
  - Summer (DST): UTC−5 (CDT)
- Area code: 423, 931
- Congressional district: 6th
- Website: vanburencountytn.com

Van Buren County is a county located in the U.S. state of Tennessee. As of the 2020 census, the population was 6,168, making it the second-least populous county in Tennessee. Its county seat is Spencer.

== History ==
Van Buren County was formed in 1840 from parts of White, Warren and Bledsoe counties. It was named for President Martin Van Buren. The county seat, Spencer, was home to Burritt College, one of the South's first coeducational colleges, during the 19th and early 20th centuries.

== Geography ==
According to the U.S. Census Bureau, the county has a total area of 275 square miles (710 km^{2}), of which 273 square miles (710 km^{2}) is land and 1.1 square miles (2.8 km^{2}) (0.4%) is water. The county straddles the western edge of the Cumberland Plateau, with the eastern portion of the county lying atop the Plateau, and the western portion lying on the lower Highland Rim. The Caney Fork, the county's primary drainage, forms part of its northern border with White County. The Rocky River, a tributary of the Caney Fork, forms part of the county's western border with Warren. Cane Creek, another tributary of the Caney Fork, drains the Fall Creek Falls area.

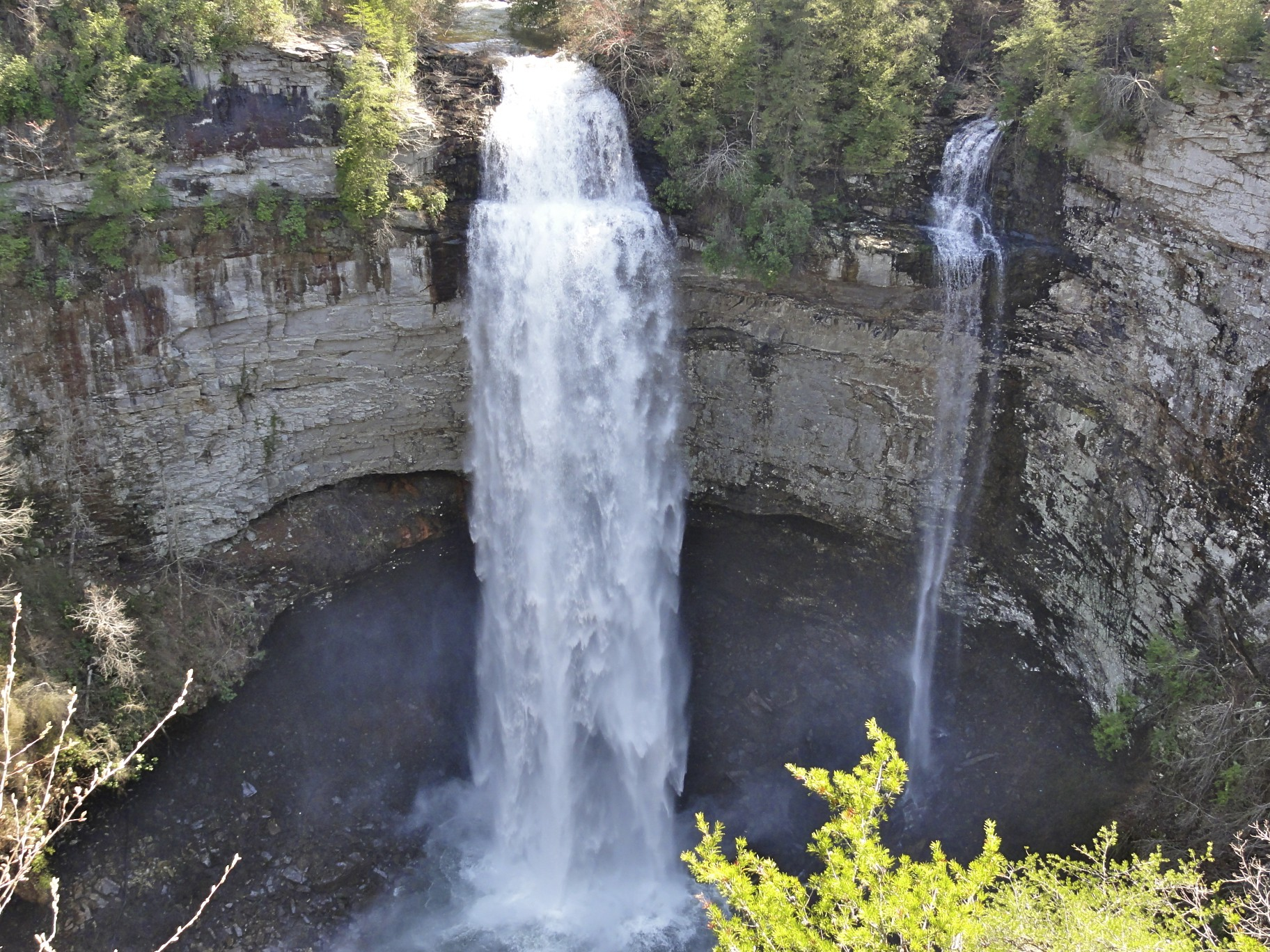
Fall Creek Falls

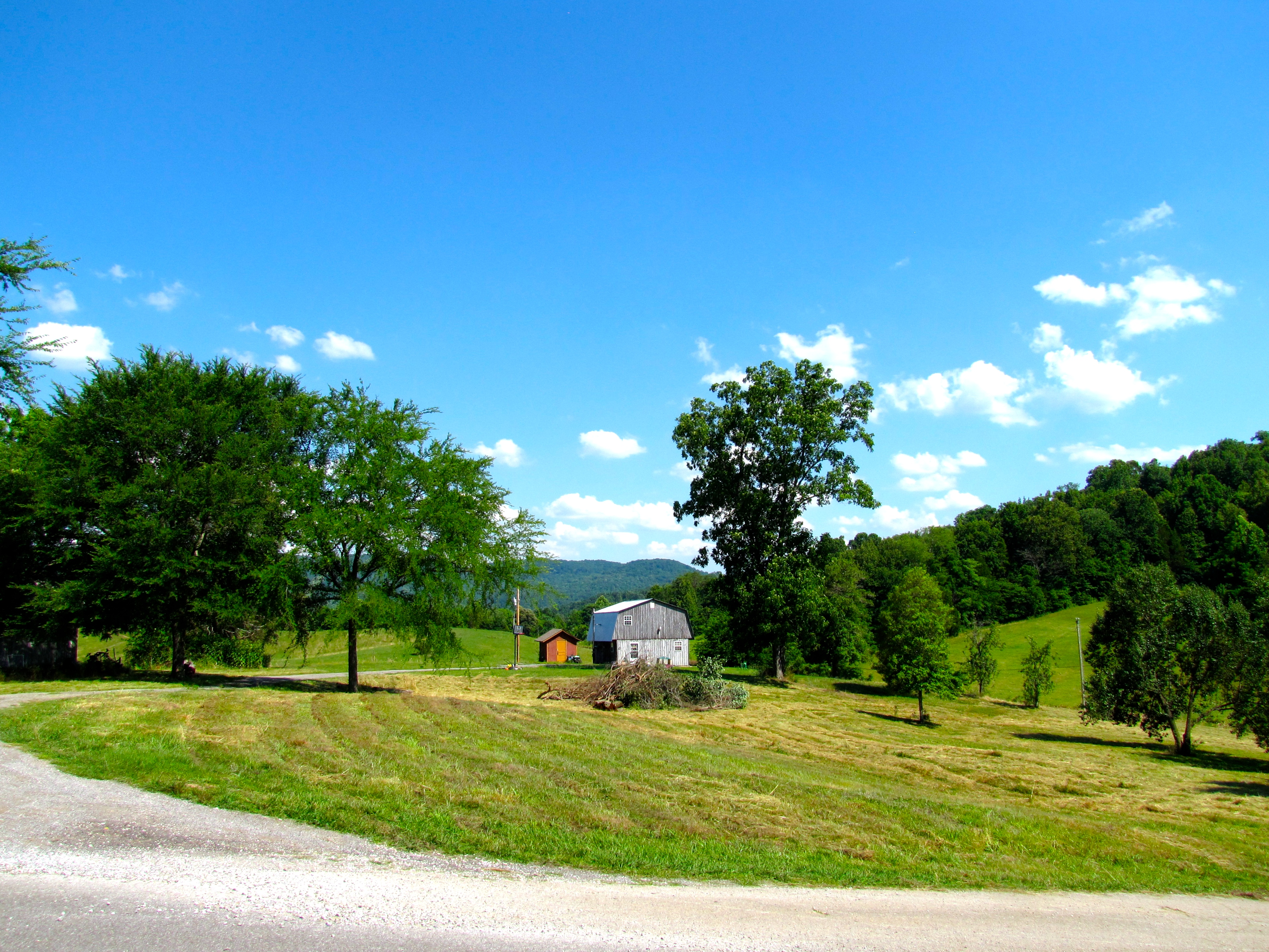
Hills near Spencer

Big Bone Cave is located in the northwest corner of Van Buren County. It is one of the best-known and most historic caverns in Tennessee. It was mined by prehistoric Indians for gypsum and salts and was the site of the largest saltpeter mine in Tennessee during the War of 1812 and again during the American Civil War. The cave is named for the discovery of the skeleton of a Giant Ground Sloth (Megalonyx jeffersoni) by saltpeter miners in 1811. Many of the wooden saltpeter mining artifacts in the cave remain in a remarkable state of preservation, due to the extreme dryness of the cave.

Van Buren County boasts over 850 documented caves (over 3.09 caves per square mile), making it one of the most cave dense regions in the world (nearby White County has over 3.17 caves per square mile).

=== Adjacent counties ===
- White County (north)
- Cumberland County (northeast)
- Bledsoe County (east)
- Sequatchie County (south)
- Warren County (west)

=== State protected areas ===
- Big Bone Cave State Natural Area
- Bledsoe State Forest (part)
- Fall Creek Falls State Natural Area (part)
- Fall Creek Falls State Resort Park (part)

== Demographics ==
Historical population
Census	Pop.	Note	%±
1850	2,674		—
1860	2,581		−3.5%
1870	2,725		5.6%
1880	2,933		7.6%
1890	2,863		−2.4%
1900	3,126		9.2%
1910	2,784		−10.9%
1920	2,624		−5.7%
1930	3,516		34.0%
1940	4,090		16.3%
1950	3,985		−2.6%
1960	3,671		−7.9%
1970	3,758		2.4%
1980	4,728		25.8%
1990	4,846		2.5%
2000	5,508		13.7%
2010	5,548		0.7%
2020	6,168		11.2%
2025 (est.)	6,874	▲	11.4%
U.S. Decennial Census; 1790-1960 1900-1990; 1990-2000 2010-2020 2020

=== Racial and ethnic composition ===
Van Buren County, Tennessee – Racial and ethnic composition Note: the US Census treats Hispanic/Latino as an ethnic category. This table excludes Latinos from the racial categories and assigns them to a separate category. Hispanics/Latinos may be of any race.
Race / Ethnicity (NH = Non-Hispanic)	Pop 1980	Pop 1990	Pop 2000	Pop 2010	Pop 2020	% 1980	% 1990	% 2000	% 2010	% 2020
White alone (NH)	4,685	4,815	5,437	5,408	5,866	99.09%	99.36%	98.71%	97.48%	95.10%
Black or African American alone (NH)	4	5	7	22	20	0.08%	0.10%	0.13%	0.40%	0.32%
Native American or Alaska Native alone (NH)	4	16	10	13	7	0.08%	0.33%	0.18%	0.23%	0.11%
Asian alone (NH)	4	0	4	7	10	0.08%	0.00%	0.07%	0.13%	0.16%
Native Hawaiian or Pacific Islander alone (NH)	x	x	0	0	1	x	x	0.00%	0.00%	0.02%
Other race alone (NH)	0	0	4	0	0	0.00%	0.00%	0.07%	0.00%	0.00%
Mixed race or Multiracial (NH)	x	x	28	48	181	x	x	0.51%	0.87%	2.93%
Hispanic or Latino (any race)	31	10	18	50	83	0.66%	0.21%	0.33%	0.90%	1.35%
Total	4,728	4,846	5,508	5,548	6,168	100.00%	100.00%	100.00%	100.00%	100.00%

=== 2020 census ===
As of the 2020 census, the county had a population of 6,168 and 1,545 families residing in the county. The median age was 46.9 years; 21.6% of residents were under the age of 18 and 23.5% were 65 years of age or older. For every 100 females there were 97.7 males, and for every 100 females age 18 and over there were 98.0 males age 18 and over.

The racial makeup of the county was 95.5% White, 0.4% Black or African American, 0.1% American Indian and Alaska Native, 0.2% Asian, <0.1% Native Hawaiian and Pacific Islander, 0.2% from some other race, and 3.7% from two or more races. Hispanic or Latino residents of any race comprised 1.3% of the population.

<0.1% of residents lived in urban areas, while 100.0% lived in rural areas.

There were 2,459 households in the county, of which 27.3% had children under the age of 18 living in them. Of all households, 52.3% were married-couple households, 18.2% were households with a male householder and no spouse or partner present, and 24.2% were households with a female householder and no spouse or partner present. About 27.6% of all households were made up of individuals and 14.9% had someone living alone who was 65 years of age or older.

There were 2,901 housing units, of which 15.2% were vacant. Among occupied housing units, 83.3% were owner-occupied and 16.7% were renter-occupied. The homeowner vacancy rate was 2.3% and the rental vacancy rate was 8.4%.

=== 2010 census ===
As of the 2010 census, there were 5,548 people and 2,096 households in the county. The population density was 20.3 people per square mile (7.8 people/km^{2}). There were 2,673 housing units at an average density of 9.8 units per square mile (3.8/km^{2}). The racial makeup of the county was 97.5% White, 0.7% Black or African American, 0.3% Native American, 0.2% Asian, and 0.9% from two or more races. 0.9% of the population were Hispanic or Latino of any race.

There were 2,096 households, out of which 29.3% had children under the age of 18 living with them, 54.9% were married couples living together, 11.7% had a female householder with no husband present, and 28.0% were non-families. 24.3% of all households were made up of individuals, while 30.6% had someone living alone who was 65 years of age or older. The average household size was 2.43. 82.6% of occupied housing units were owner-occupied, meaning that 17.4% were renter-occupied.

In the county, the population was spread out, with 23.2% up to the age of 19, 8.8% from 20 to 29, 12.4% from 30 to 39, 13.4% from 40 to 49, 16.8% from 50 to 59, 14.7% from 60 to 69, and 10.7% who were 70 years of age or older. The median age was 44.5 years. Women make up 50.2% of the population.

The median income for a household in the county was $29,087. The per capita income for the county was $17,160. 24.6% of the population were below the poverty line.

== Recreation ==
Van Buren County is home to a portion of Fall Creek Falls State Resort Park.

== Communities ==
=== Town ===
- Spencer (county seat)

=== Unincorporated communities ===
- Bone Cave
- Cedar Grove

== Education ==
Van Buren County Schools operates public schools.

== Politics ==
For many decades, Van Buren county was a reliably Democratic county at the presidential level, voting for the Democratic candidate for president in all but two elections from 1880 to 2004. This trend has reversed dramatically in recent years, with Republican candidates winning the county in each of the past four elections. In 2024, Republican Donald Trump won the highest share of the vote for a Republican presidential candidate ever in Van Buren County, earning 83.3% of the vote.

United States presidential election results for Van Buren County, Tennessee
Year	Republican		Democratic		Third party(ies)	
Year	No.	%	No.	%	No.	%
1912	106	27.53%	225	58.44%	54	14.03%
1916	151	26.58%	405	71.30%	12	2.11%
1920	223	38.32%	351	60.31%	8	1.37%
1924	123	25.47%	357	73.91%	3	0.62%
1928	257	49.71%	260	50.29%	0	0.00%
1932	196	23.53%	613	73.59%	24	2.88%
1936	251	26.67%	690	73.33%	0	0.00%
1940	318	30.20%	732	69.52%	3	0.28%
1944	291	35.49%	526	64.15%	3	0.37%
1948	298	30.47%	636	65.03%	44	4.50%
1952	393	36.12%	674	61.95%	21	1.93%
1956	381	38.45%	602	60.75%	8	0.81%
1960	401	40.30%	577	57.99%	17	1.71%
1964	293	25.30%	865	74.70%	0	0.00%
1968	327	29.30%	282	25.27%	507	45.43%
1972	629	61.61%	364	35.65%	28	2.74%
1976	346	23.99%	1,085	75.24%	11	0.76%
1980	499	35.54%	886	63.11%	19	1.35%
1984	718	46.78%	810	52.77%	7	0.46%
1988	780	49.37%	796	50.38%	4	0.25%
1992	555	26.68%	1,329	63.89%	196	9.42%
1996	504	30.31%	1,010	60.73%	149	8.96%
2000	845	39.65%	1,255	58.89%	31	1.45%
2004	1,120	47.72%	1,209	51.51%	18	0.77%
2008	1,294	58.66%	849	38.49%	63	2.86%
2012	1,386	60.26%	875	38.04%	39	1.70%
2016	1,820	75.24%	539	22.28%	60	2.48%
2020	2,342	80.18%	544	18.62%	35	1.20%
2024	2,718	83.25%	524	16.05%	23	0.70%

== See also ==
- National Register of Historic Places listings in Van Buren County, Tennessee
