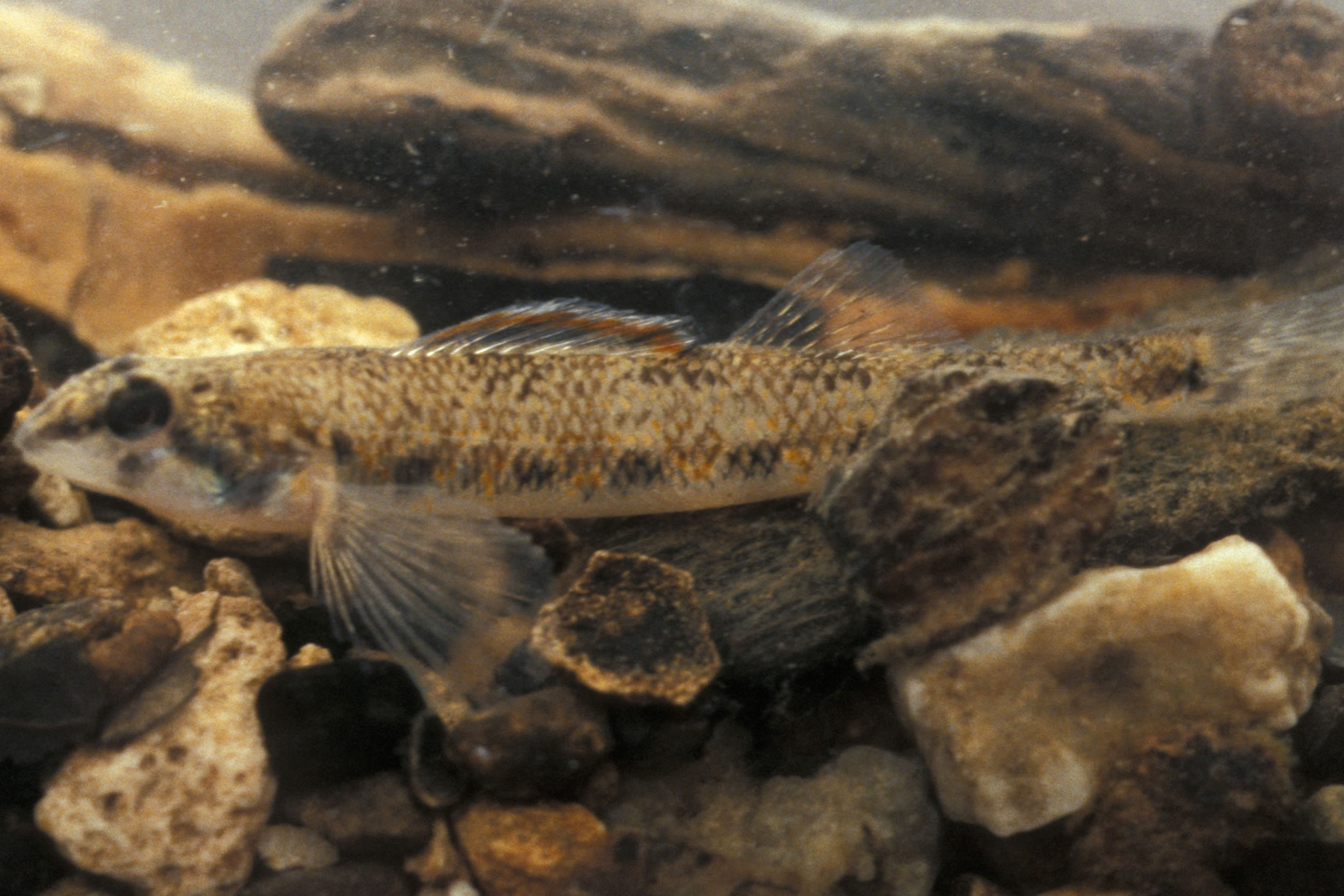

Conservation status
- Endangered (IUCN 3.1)

Scientific classification
- Kingdom: Animalia
- Phylum: Chordata
- Class: Actinopterygii
- Order: Perciformes
- Family: Percidae
- Genus: Etheostoma
- Species: E. akatulo

Binomial name
- Etheostoma akatulo Layman & Mayden, 2009

= Bluemask darter =

Species of fish

The bluemask darter (Etheostoma akatulo) is a species of freshwater ray-finned fish, a darter from the subfamily Etheostomatinae, part of the family Percidae, which also contains the perches, ruffes and pikeperches. It is endemic to the eastern United States. It is a federally listed endangered species of the United States. This fish was not formally described until 2009, but it was added to the US Endangered Species List in 1993. During breeding, the male has bright blue patches on its head and other areas. This fish is found only in the Caney Fork River system, a tributary of the Cumberland River in Tennessee. The species name akatulo comes from the Cherokee for "mask", referring to the solid blue coloration on the lower face of the fish.

== Anatomy and appearance ==
The species differs from other species of the subgenus Doration by having fully scaled cheeks, complete lateral line, breeding males with bright blue pigment completely covering the lower face, and breeding males with soft dorsal and anal fins lacking orange and blue pigment.

== Geographic distribution ==
Etheostoma akatulo is known from five small rivers and large creeks of the upper Caney Fork River system, Tennessee, including Collins River, Rocky River, Calfkiller River, Cane Creek, and upper Caney Fork River. Etheostoma akatulo is most abundant and widely distributed in Collins River, where it occurs in a 37-km reach between Shellsford, Warren County, and Tennessee Highway 56, 1.2 km east of Mt. Olive, Grundy County. In the Rocky River, the species inhabits only a 4.3-km reach from Tennessee Highway 30 upstream to Laurelburg Road ford, Van Buren Co., including a 1.7-km reach that alternates between backwater and free-flowing conditions as Great Falls Reservoir fluctuates between maximum (244 m) and minimum (240 m) pool elevations. In Cane Creek, recent collections are from the lower 200 m of free-flowing waters in Van Buren Co. In upper Caney Fork River, the species has been collected in an intermittent reach located only 1.8 river km upstream of reservoir maximum pool in White Co. Etheostoma akatulo is restricted in distribution to the Caney Fork River system in free-flowing streams upstream of Great Falls. All four extant populations apparently are isolated from one another by the impounded waters of Great Falls Reservoir.

== Ecology ==
Etheostoma akatulo occurs in slow to moderate current over sand and fine gravel at depths of 10–50 cm, typically just downstream of riffles, in runs, or along margins of pools. During spawning Etheostoma akatulo males and females have been seen occupying different microhabitats. Substrate dominated by gravel were occupied by lone males and spawning pairs, whereas most lone females were found over a sand-dominant substrate. After the spawning period, Bluemask Darters move to sandy substrates in low-velocity areas of intermediate depth.

== Life history ==
The life cycle of Etheostoma akatulo has been compared to that of Etheostoma stigmaeum. Etheostoma akatulo, before it was formally described, was once considered a subspecies of Etheostoma stigmaeum. E. stigmaeum is known to lay its eggs in gravelly areas and after they have been laid, it covers them with the gravel. Etheostoma akatulo is believed to demonstrate the same egg laying behavior. E. akatulo can live to be 39 months old. They show the highest amount of growth during the first year of life but do not reach sexual maturity until year two.

== Management ==
Etheostoma akatulo was listed as a federally endangered species in 1993. Existing and potential threats to continued survival of the species include habitat destruction from gravel dredging, which has already eliminated habitat once occupied by the species in Collins River; pesticides in runoff or groundwater from plant nurseries; siltation from gravel mining, agricultural runoff, or land-disturbing activities; and acid mine drainage from headwater streams. The most significant factor contributing to the bluemask darter's decline was likely the building of the Great Falls Dam. The reservoir impounded by the dam flooded over 80 kilometers of possible bluemask darter habitat and isolated the tributary populations from each other. Because of the isolation, the genetic viability over a long period of time is questionable for the species. One of the current plans for management is the reintroduction of Etheostoma akatulo to the Calfkiller River. Because of gravel dredging the substrate in Calfkiller River is not ideal so first they are making new sand and gravel substrates. Then, the reintroduction of the fish will begin.
