= Big Bone Cave =

Cave in Van Buren County, Tennessee

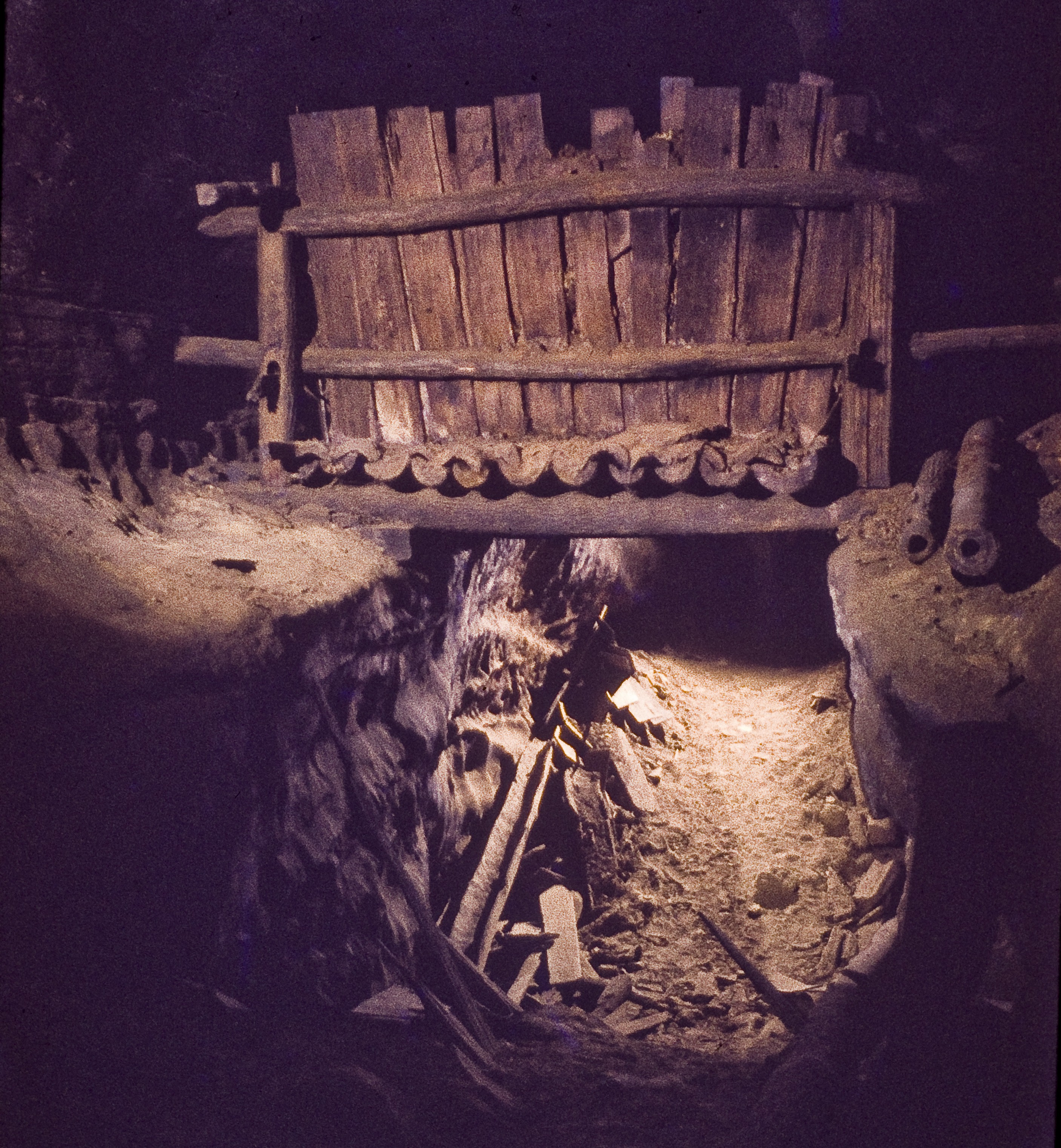
- Civil-war era saltpeter vat in Big Bone Cave
- Interactive map of Big Bone Cave
- Location: Van Buren County, Tennessee, United States
- Length: 9.627 m (15.494 km)
- Discovery: c. 1810
- Geology: Monteagle Limestone
- Entrances: 2
- Entrances list: Main Entrance (collapsed), Arch Cave Entrance
- Hazards: histoplasmosis
- Access: restricted
- Website: TDEC: Big Bone Cave
- Big Bone Cave
- U.S. National Register of Historic Places
- Location within Tennessee
- Location: Van Buren County, Tennessee, United States
- Nearest city: Bone Cave, Tennessee
- Coordinates: 35.7726°N 85.557°W
- Area: 400 acres (160 ha)
- NRHP reference No.: 73001853
- Added to NRHP: April 11, 1973

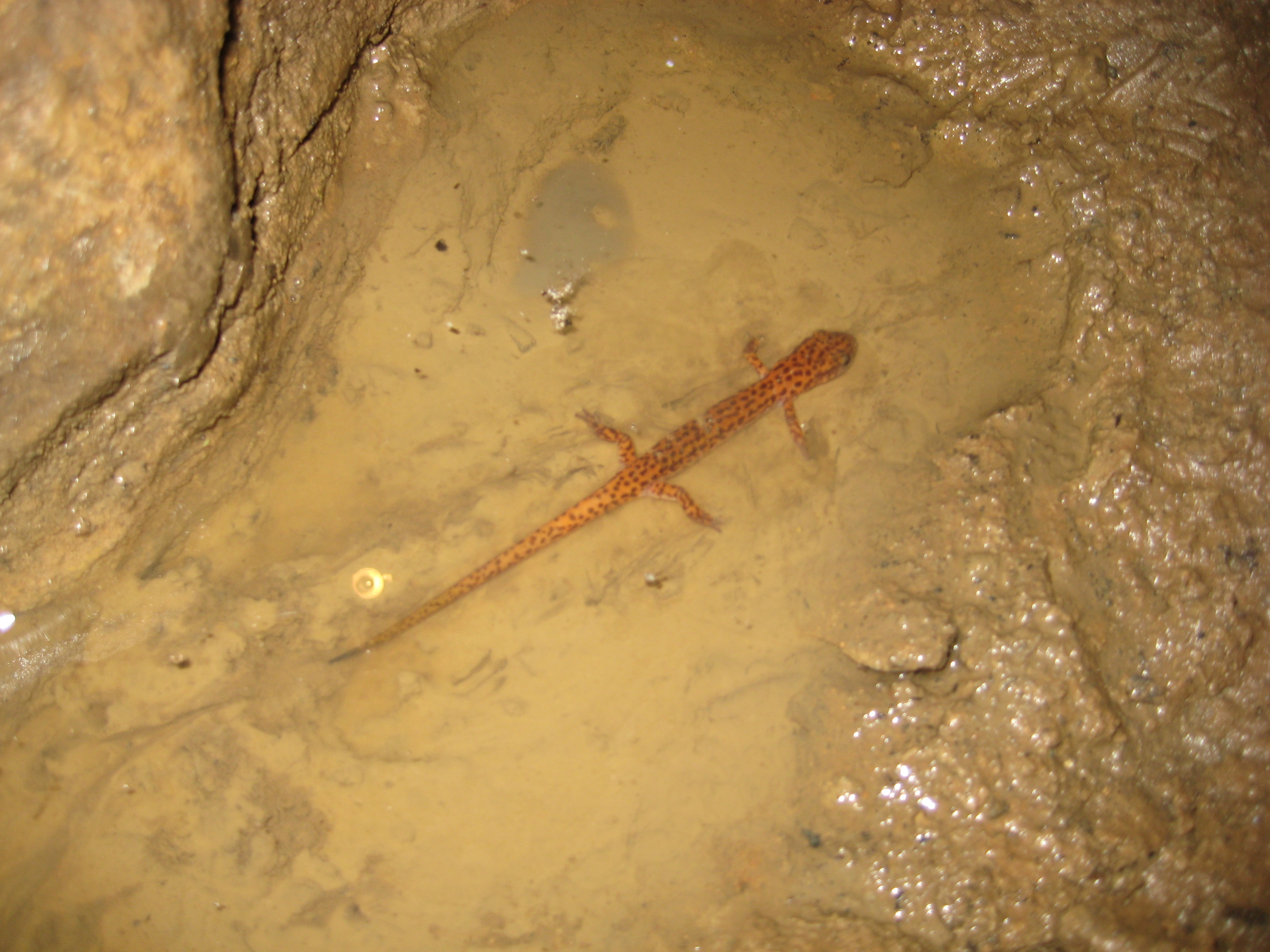
Cave salamander in Bone Cave

(Big) Bone Cave is a cave located in Van Buren County, Tennessee, in the community of Bone Cave that is named after it. It is notable both for its history and current recreational use. It is listed on the National Register of Historic Places and a designated National Natural Landmark. It is a 400-acre (161.9 ha) State Natural Area managed by Rock Island State Park. It is named for the discovery of the bones of a giant ground sloth in 1811. The cave was operated as a saltpeter mine, notably during the War of 1812 and the American Civil War. A variety of natural remains and human artifacts have been well preserved in the dry atmosphere of the cave. The cave is the 10th longest mapped cave in Tennessee.

Big Bone Cave formed in Mississippian Montegeale limestone originally on the western escarpment of the Cumberland Plateau. The cave formed prior to 5.7 ±1.09 Ma based in cosmogenic radionuclide dating of pebbles washed into the Muster Ground room. Long passages formed during a long period of water table stability when the climate was warmer and sea levels were higher reducing erosion throughout the Mississippi drainage. At the time, the Cumberland River flowed across the Highland Rim before the formation of the Nashville Basin. Global cooling 3.2-3.1 Ma triggered a 75–100-metre (246–328 ft) sea-level drop which increased erosion (incision) up the Mississippi River and led to the Cumberland River cutting into the Highland Rim and its headwaters, the Collins River, cutting into the Cumberland Plateau. The lower water table would have drained the water filling the caverns. Further erosion isolated Bone Cave Mountain from the Cumberland Plateau.
