= Daylight, Tennessee =

Unincorporated community in Tennessee, US

Coordinates: 35°44′45″N 85°51′27″W

Daylight is an unincorporated community in Warren County, Tennessee.

== History ==
A post office called Daylight was established in 1882, and remained in operation until 1963. A first settler selected the name "Daylight" on account of its euphonic sound.
