= Spring Creek, Warren County, Tennessee =

Spring Creek, Tennessee
- Unincorporated community
- Location within Tennessee Location within the United States
- Coordinates: 35°33′51″N 85°37′09″W
- Country: United States
- State: Tennessee
- County: Warren
- Elevation: 1,030 ft (310 m)
- Time zone: UTC-6 (Central (CST))
  - Summer (DST): UTC-5 (CDT)
- Area code: 931
- GNIS feature ID: 1314323

Spring Creek is an unincorporated community in Warren County, Tennessee, United States. Spring Creek is located in the southeast corner of Warren County 12 miles (19 km) southeast of McMinnville.
