= Cedar Grove, Van Buren County, Tennessee =

Cedar Grove, Tennessee
- Unincorporated community
- Location within Tennessee Location within the United States
- Coordinates: 35°44′10″N 85°33′43″W
- Country: United States
- State: Tennessee
- County: Van Buren
- Elevation: 958 ft (292 m)
- Time zone: UTC-6 (Central (CST))
  - Summer (DST): UTC-5 (CDT)
- Area code: 931
- GNIS feature ID: 1312041

Cedar Grove is an unincorporated community in Van Buren County, Tennessee, United States. Cedar Grove is located on Tennessee State Route 30 5.4 miles (8.7 km) west of Spencer.
