= Warren County, Tennessee =

County in Tennessee, United States

- County
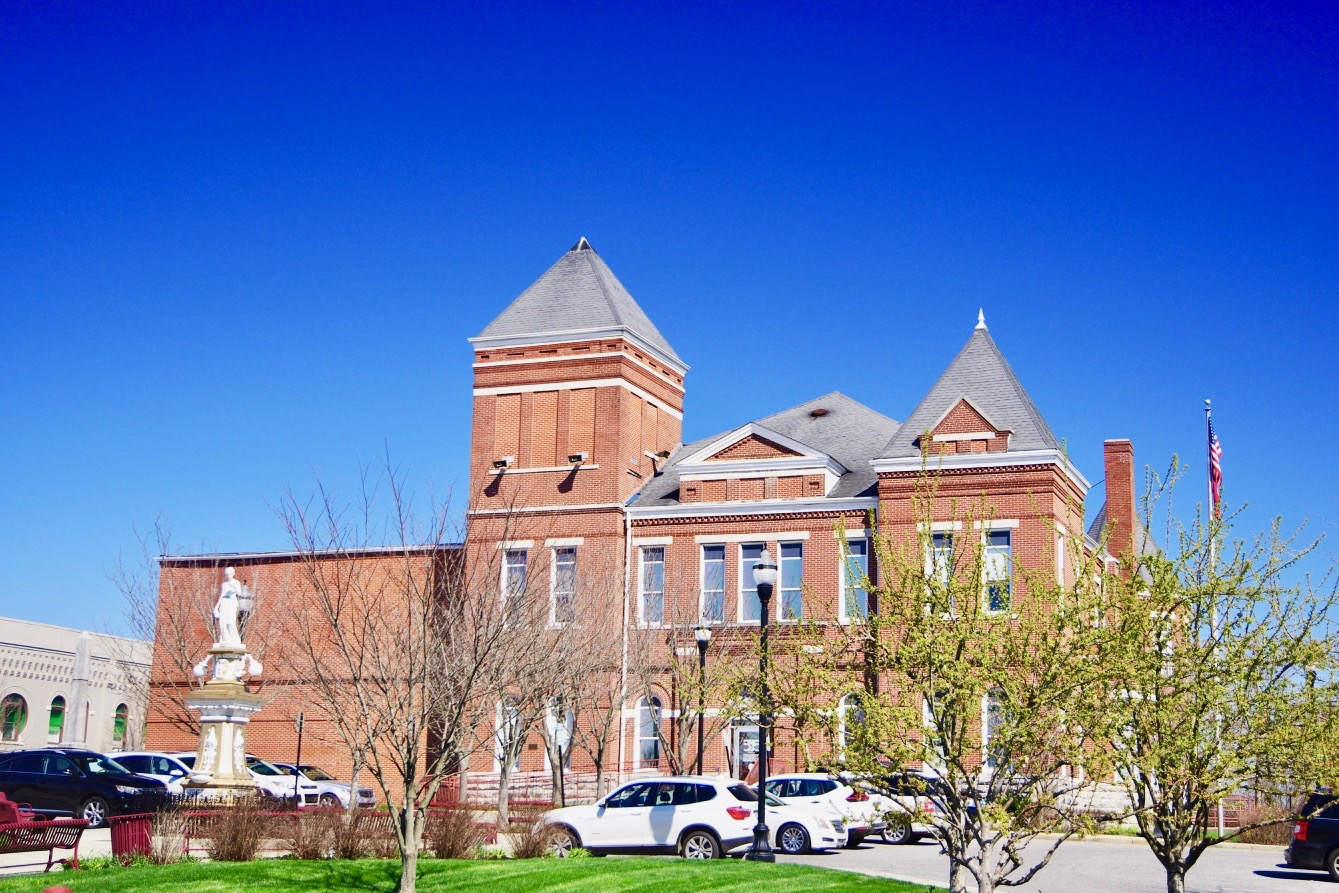
- Warren County Courthouse in McMinnville

- Flag

- Location within the U.S. state of Tennessee
- Coordinates: 35°41′N 85°47′W
- Country: United States
- State: Tennessee
- Founded: 1807
- Named for: Joseph Warren
- Seat: McMinnville
- Largest city: McMinnville

Area
  - Total: 434 sq mi (1,120 km^{2})
  - Land: 433 sq mi (1,120 km^{2})
  - Water: 1.4 sq mi (3.6 km^{2}) 3%

Population (2020)
  - Total: 40,953
  - Estimate (2025): 43,717 ▲
  - Density: 92/sq mi (36/km^{2})
- Time zone: UTC−6 (Central)
  - Summer (DST): UTC−5 (CDT)
- Congressional districts: 4th, 6th
- Website: www.warrencountytn.gov

Warren County is a county located on the Cumberland Plateau in Middle Tennessee, one of the three Grand Divisions of the U.S. state of Tennessee. As of the 2020 census, the population was 40,953. Its county seat is McMinnville. Warren County comprises the McMinnville, TN Micropolitan Statistical Area.

== History ==
Warren County was created in 1807 from a portion of White County, and named for Joseph Warren (1741–1775), a militiaman and major general in the American Revolution. The revised Tennessee State Constitution of 1834 stated that no new county could be within 12 miles (19 km) of the county seat of the county from which it was formed. The boundaries of five counties formed from Warren— Grundy, Van Buren, Cannon, Coffee and DeKalb— were exactly 12 miles from Warren's county seat, McMinnville, giving the county its distinctive round shape. Warren County was the site of several saltpeter mines. Saltpeter is the main ingredient of gunpowder and was obtained by leaching the earth from several local caves. Hubbards Cave, near Camp Woodlee, was a major operation. Henshaw Cave on Cardwell Mountain (now part of Cumberland Caverns) and Solomon Saltpeter Cave on Ben Lomond Mountain were relatively small mining operations. Most saltpeter mining occurred during the War of 1812 and in the Civil War.

The county was largely developed for farming of such crops as tobacco and hemp. While numerous families held African Americans as slaves, they were a minority of the population. Warren County citizens voted to secede from the Union before the American Civil War in February 1861 in a state referendum. Voters in Tennessee overall decided to remain in the Union in that time. When President Abraham Lincoln demanded that Tennessee provide troops to fight against the Southern states in April 1861, it was viewed as a violation of Article 3, Section 3 of the U.S. Constitution. At a new referendum in June 1861, Warren County again, along with a majority of Tennessee's counties, voted for secession. Unlike in some states, slavery was not listed as one of the reasons in Tennessee's secession proclamation.

Men from Warren County and surrounding upper Cumberland region formed and served in many units in Tennessee's defense, including the 16th Tennessee Infantry led by McMinnville resident Col. John Houston Savage. The Confederate monument next to the county courthouse is dedicated in the memory of the men who served and died in the 16th and lists their names.

Men from Warren County and upper Cumberland area joined the 16th TN Infantry Regiment, among others. Their flag is on display at the Texas 'Civil War' Museum in Fort Worth TX.

== Geography ==
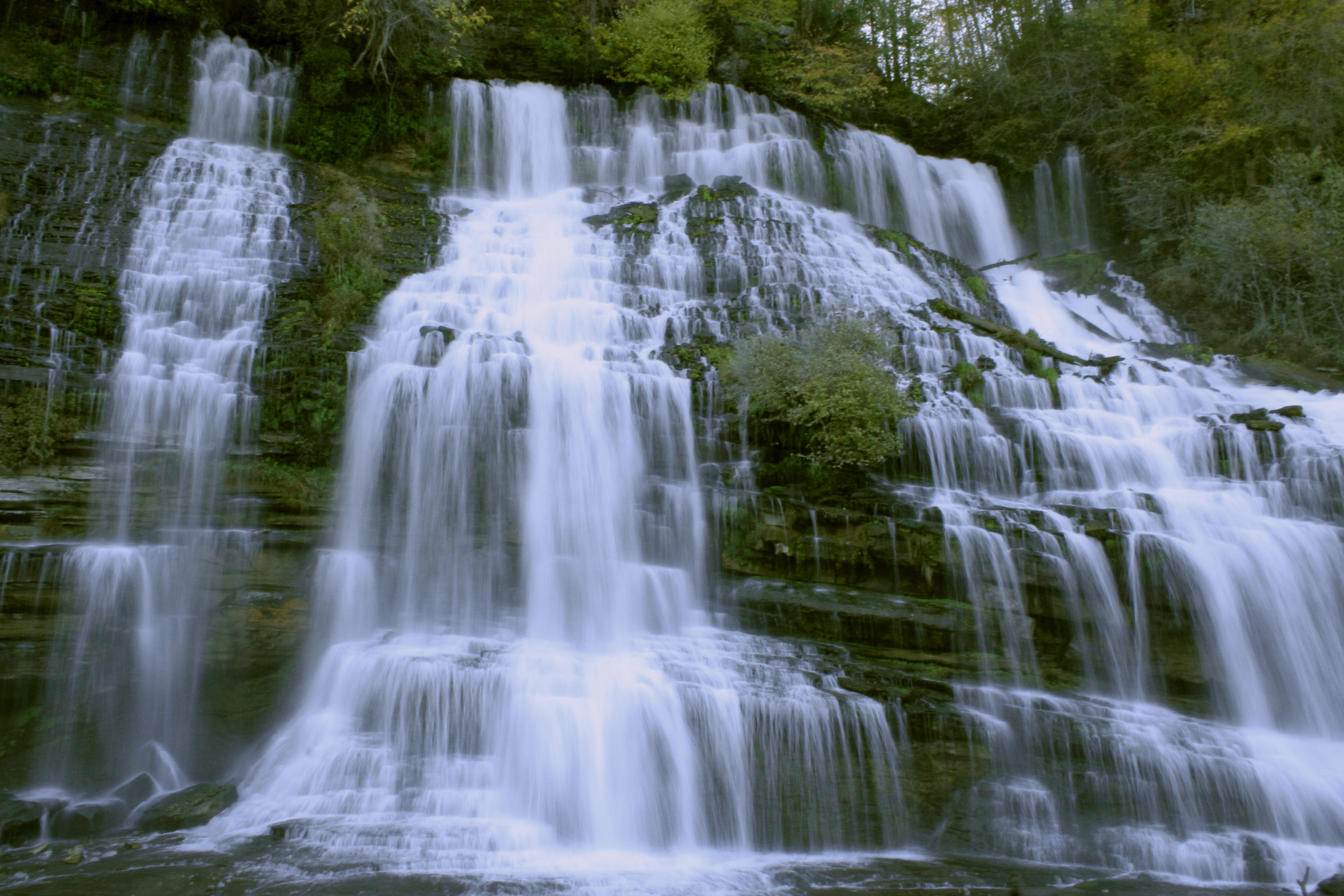
Twin Falls at Rock Island State Park

According to the U.S. Census Bureau, the county has a total area of 434 square miles (1,120 km^{2}), of which 433 square miles (1,120 km^{2}) is land and 1.4 square miles (3.6 km^{2}) (0.3%) is water. The county lies long the Eastern Highland Rim, near the Cumberland Plateau.

The Caney Fork forms part of the county's borders with White and DeKalb counties to the north. The Rocky River, a tributary of the Caney Fork, forms part of the county's eastern border with Van Buren County. The Collins River, also a tributary of the Caney Fork, flows through the county, and the Barren Fork, a tributary of the Collins, flows through McMinnville.

Cardwell Mountain is an imposing natural feature located five miles due east of McMinnville. It is an erosional remnant of the nearby Cumberland Plateau. Cardwell Mountain is noted for Cumberland Caverns, an exceptionally long cave which lies underneath the mountain.

=== Adjacent counties ===
- DeKalb County (north)
- White County (northeast)
- Van Buren County (east)
- Sequatchie County (southeast)
- Grundy County (south)
- Coffee County (southwest)
- Cannon County (northwest)

=== Major highways ===
- U.S. Route 70S
- State Route 8
- State Route 30
- State Route 55
- State Route 56
- State Route 108
- State Route 136

=== State protected areas ===
- Hubbard's Cave State Natural Area
- Morrison Meadow State Natural Area
- Rock Island State Park (part)

== Demographics ==
Historical population
Census	Pop.	Note	%±
1810	5,725		—
1820	10,348		80.8%
1830	15,210		47.0%
1840	10,803		−29.0%
1850	10,179		−5.8%
1860	11,147		9.5%
1870	12,714		14.1%
1880	14,079		10.7%
1890	14,413		2.4%
1900	16,410		13.9%
1910	16,534		0.8%
1920	17,306		4.7%
1930	20,209		16.8%
1940	19,764		−2.2%
1950	22,271		12.7%
1960	23,102		3.7%
1970	26,972		16.8%
1980	32,653		21.1%
1990	32,992		1.0%
2000	38,276		16.0%
2010	39,839		4.1%
2020	40,953		2.8%
2025 (est.)	43,717	▲	6.7%
U.S. Decennial Census; 1790-1960 1900-1990; 1990-2000 2010-2014

=== Racial and ethnic composition ===
Warren County, Tennessee – Racial and ethnic composition Note: the US Census treats Hispanic/Latino as an ethnic category. This table excludes Latinos from the racial categories and assigns them to a separate category. Hispanics/Latinos may be of any race.
Race / Ethnicity (NH = Non-Hispanic)	Pop 1980	Pop 1990	Pop 2000	Pop 2010	Pop 2020	% 1980	% 1990	% 2000	% 2010	% 2020
White alone (NH)	31,162	31,414	34,688	34,739	33,980	95.43%	95.22%	90.63%	87.20%	82.97%
Black or African American alone (NH)	1,182	1,125	1,196	1,085	1,090	3.62%	3.41%	3.12%	2.72%	2.66%
Native American or Alaska Native alone (NH)	30	51	72	95	84	0.09%	0.15%	0.19%	0.24%	0.21%
Asian alone (NH)	29	115	159	190	258	0.09%	0.35%	0.42%	0.48%	0.63%
Native Hawaiian or Pacific Islander alone (NH)	x	x	8	12	10	x	x	0.02%	0.03%	0.02%
Other race alone (NH)	13	11	6	32	138	0.04%	0.03%	0.02%	0.08%	0.34%
Mixed race or Multiracial (NH)	x	x	262	462	1,450	x	x	0.68%	1.16%	3.54%
Hispanic or Latino (any race)	237	276	1,885	3,224	3,943	0.73%	0.84%	4.92%	8.09%	9.63%
Total	32,653	32,992	38,276	39,839	40,953	100.00%	100.00%	100.00%	100.00%	100.00%

=== 2020 census ===
As of the 2020 census, there were 40,953 people, 16,336 households, and 10,167 families residing in the county.

The median age was 41.2 years; 23.2% of residents were under the age of 18 and 18.8% were 65 years of age or older, with 96.7 males per 100 females and 94.9 males per 100 females age 18 and over.

38.4% of residents lived in urban areas, while 61.6% lived in rural areas.

There were 16,336 households in the county, of which 30.1% had children under the age of 18 living in them, 46.6% were married-couple households, 18.9% had a male householder with no spouse or partner present, and 27.6% had a female householder with no spouse or partner present. About 28.7% of households were made up of individuals and 13.2% had someone living alone who was 65 years of age or older.

There were 18,088 housing units, of which 9.7% were vacant; of the occupied units, 70.5% were owner-occupied and 29.5% were renter-occupied, with homeowner and rental vacancy rates of 1.7% and 8.2%, respectively.

The racial makeup of the county was 85.0% White, 2.7% Black or African American, 0.4% American Indian and Alaska Native, 0.6% Asian, <0.1% Native Hawaiian and Pacific Islander, 5.3% from some other race, and 6.1% from two or more races, while Hispanic or Latino residents of any race comprised 9.6% of the population.

=== 2000 census ===
As of the census of 2000, there were 38,276 people, 15,181 households, and 10,824 families residing in the county. The population density was 88 people per square mile (34 people/km^{2}). There were 16,689 housing units at an average density of 39 units per square mile (15/km^{2}). The racial makeup of the county was 91.66% White, 3.16% Black or African American, 0.21% Native American, 0.42% Asian, 0.05% Pacific Islander, 3.56% from other races, and 0.94% from two or more races. 4.92% of the population were Hispanic or Latino of any race.

There were 15,181 households, out of which 31.90% had children under the age of 18 living with them, 56.20% were married couples living together, 11.20% had a female householder with no husband present, and 28.70% were non-families. 25.00% of all households were made up of individuals, and 10.50% had someone living alone who was 65 years of age or older. The average household size was 2.47 and the average family size was 2.93.

In the county, the population was spread out, with 24.20% under the age of 18, 9.10% from 18 to 24, 29.40% from 25 to 44, 23.40% from 45 to 64, and 13.90% who were 65 years of age or older. The median age was 37 years. For every 100 females there were 96.50 males. For every 100 females age 18 and over, there were 94.70 males.

The median income for a household in the county was $30,920, and the median income for a family was $37,835. Males had a median income of $28,409 versus $20,863 for females. The per capita income for the county was $15,759. About 13.00% of families and 16.60% of the population were below the poverty line, including 20.40% of those under age 18 and 17.20% of those age 65 or over.

== Recreation ==
Rock Island State Park is located on the northeastern border with White County. This park is the site of the Tennessee Valley Authority's Great Falls Dam, includes many hiking trails, and offers whitewater rafting.

Cumberland Caverns, located east of McMinnville under Cardwell Mountain, is Tennessee's largest show cave. It is the second longest mapped cave in Tennessee with 27.6 miles (44.4 km) of passages, and displays some of the largest cave rooms in eastern North America. Cumberland Caverns is the 15th longest cave in the United States.

Hubbard's Cave, the largest gray bat hibernaculum in Tennessee, with over 100,000 bats, is located in the county. The cave is owned by the Nature Conservancy and it is securely gated to protect the bats, which are an Endangered Species.

Falcon Rest, an 1896 Victorian mansion in McMinnville built by local manufacturer Clay Faulkner, is listed on the National Register of Historic Places (NRHP). It is open to the public as a historic house museum. His father's mansion in the same city, Falconhurst, is also on the NRHP.

== Communities ==
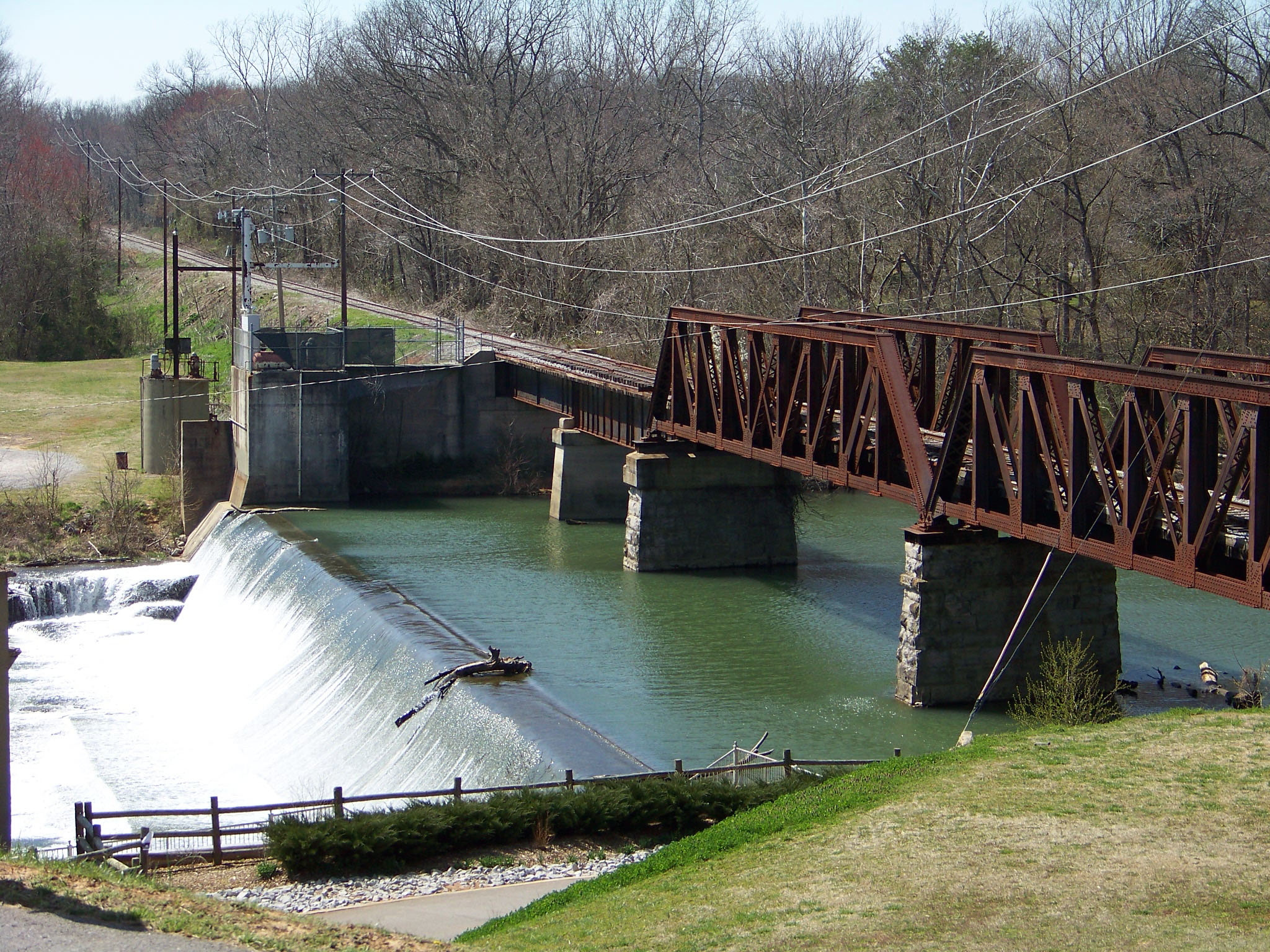
Railroad bridge over Barren Fork in McMinnville

=== City ===
- McMinnville (county seat)

=== Towns ===
- Centertown
- Morrison
- Viola

=== Unincorporated communities ===
- Berea
- Bratchers Crossroads
- Campaign
- Daylight
- Irving College
- Midway
- Rock Island
- Shady Rest
- Shellsford
- Smartt
- Spring Creek
- Stewart Chapel

== Politics ==
United States presidential election results for Warren County, Tennessee
Year	Republican		Democratic		Third party(ies)	
Year	No.	%	No.	%	No.	%
1912	339	14.43%	1,745	74.26%	266	11.32%
1916	624	24.98%	1,855	74.26%	19	0.76%
1920	1,010	33.53%	1,986	65.94%	16	0.53%
1924	490	26.15%	1,356	72.36%	28	1.49%
1928	923	45.18%	1,111	54.38%	9	0.44%
1932	410	14.83%	2,325	84.09%	30	1.08%
1936	553	19.27%	2,304	80.28%	13	0.45%
1940	546	18.91%	2,323	80.46%	18	0.62%
1944	848	24.73%	2,560	74.66%	21	0.61%
1948	807	18.08%	2,969	66.51%	688	15.41%
1952	1,912	34.68%	3,568	64.72%	33	0.60%
1956	1,954	32.58%	4,014	66.92%	30	0.50%
1960	2,682	45.92%	3,119	53.40%	40	0.68%
1964	1,754	25.87%	5,027	74.13%	0	0.00%
1968	1,858	24.07%	2,046	26.51%	3,814	49.42%
1972	3,565	60.49%	2,118	35.93%	211	3.58%
1976	2,364	25.94%	6,666	73.13%	85	0.93%
1980	3,680	37.16%	6,021	60.79%	203	2.05%
1984	4,811	49.64%	4,813	49.66%	67	0.69%
1988	4,529	49.13%	4,646	50.40%	43	0.47%
1992	3,704	29.98%	7,189	58.19%	1,462	11.83%
1996	4,226	36.33%	6,389	54.92%	1,018	8.75%
2000	5,552	42.28%	7,378	56.19%	201	1.53%
2004	7,503	52.10%	6,808	47.28%	89	0.62%
2008	8,562	59.46%	5,515	38.30%	323	2.24%
2012	8,010	61.54%	4,752	36.51%	253	1.94%
2016	9,540	70.09%	3,535	25.97%	537	3.95%
2020	11,850	74.02%	3,924	24.51%	235	1.47%
2024	13,192	77.53%	3,647	21.43%	176	1.03%

Warren County was a Democratic stronghold for most of the 20th century. The last Democrat to win Warren County was Al Gore in 2000. After the 2000 election, Warren County began to trend Republican, with each passing election having an increasing margin for the Republican candidate. Donald Trump won Warren county in 2016 by 42%, compared to Mitt Romney's margin of 25% in 2012.

== See also ==
- National Register of Historic Places listings in Warren County, Tennessee
