= Stewart Chapel, Tennessee =

- Unincorporated community
- Location within Tennessee Location within the United States
- Coordinates: 35°48′15″N 85°53′02″W
- Country: United States
- State: Tennessee
- County: Warren
- Elevation: 1,125 ft (343 m)
- Time zone: UTC-6 (Central (CST))
  - Summer (DST): UTC-5 (CDT)
- Area code: 931
- GNIS feature ID: 1647550

Stewart Chapel is an unincorporated community in Warren County, Tennessee, United States.
