= Bratchers Crossroads, Tennessee =

Unincorporated community in Tennessee, US

Coordinates: 35°46′10″N 85°54′42″W

Bratchers Crossroads is an unincorporated community in Warren County, in the U.S. state of Tennessee.

== History ==
The community was likely named for Benjamin Bratcher, an early settler.
