= Bone Cave (Tasmania) =

Australian archaeogical site

- Location within Tasmania
- Location: Tasmania
- Coordinates: 42.837°S 146.457°E
- Features: Stone artifacts made from various raw materials including chert, quartz, quartzite, and hornfels

Bone Cave, located in the Middle Weld Valley of Tasmania, is a small vertical limestone cave with a rich history of human occupation.

== History ==
The oldest dated materials found at the site, including charcoal and stone artifacts, date back to around 29,000 years ago. However, the period of most intensive human use occurred between 16,000 and 14,000 years ago, after the glacial maximum.

During this period, the cave was used as a workshop for the production of stone tools, with the most common materials used being quartzite, chert, and quartz. The use of bipolar anvilling, a method for fracturing small water-rounded quartz pebbles, increased during this time. Large flakes of quartzite and chert were also common and were often used to create steep-edged scrapers.

The cave was also used as a hunting site, with the red-necked wallaby being the most commonly hunted prey, followed by wombats. A wider variety of other animals were also hunted.

Evidence of human occupation at Bone Cave appears to be sporadic, with long gaps between periods of occupation dating back to 35,000-10,000 years ago. The site was eventually abandoned and covered with a layer of moon milk.

In addition to stone tools, a single piece of Darwin glass, a type of rare and ancient glass found in the region, was also found at the site dating back to between 16,000 and 14,000 years ago. This makes Bone Cave the occupation site located the greatest distance from the Darwin Crater, where the glass is more commonly found, with a direct line distance of 100 km.

History Of The Cave: The oldest dated materials found data the cave, include charcoal and stone artifacts.Dated to around 20,000 years ago. The cave is a hunting site, with the red-necked wallaby being the most haunted pray, followed by wombats
