= Berea, Warren County, Tennessee =

Unincorporated community in Tennessee, US

Coordinates: 35°48′32″N 85°42′16″W

Berea is an unincorporated community in Warren County, in the U.S. state of Tennessee.

== History ==
The community was named after the biblical place of Berea.
