= Shady Rest, Warren County, Tennessee =

Unincorporated community in Tennessee, US

Coordinates: 35°42′59″N 85°43′29″W

Shady Rest is an unincorporated community in Warren County, in the U.S. state of Tennessee.

== History ==
The community was named from the presence of the Shady Rest Tourist Court.
