= Cumberland Caverns =

Cave in Tennessee, United States

- Higgenbotham Cave, Henshaw Cave
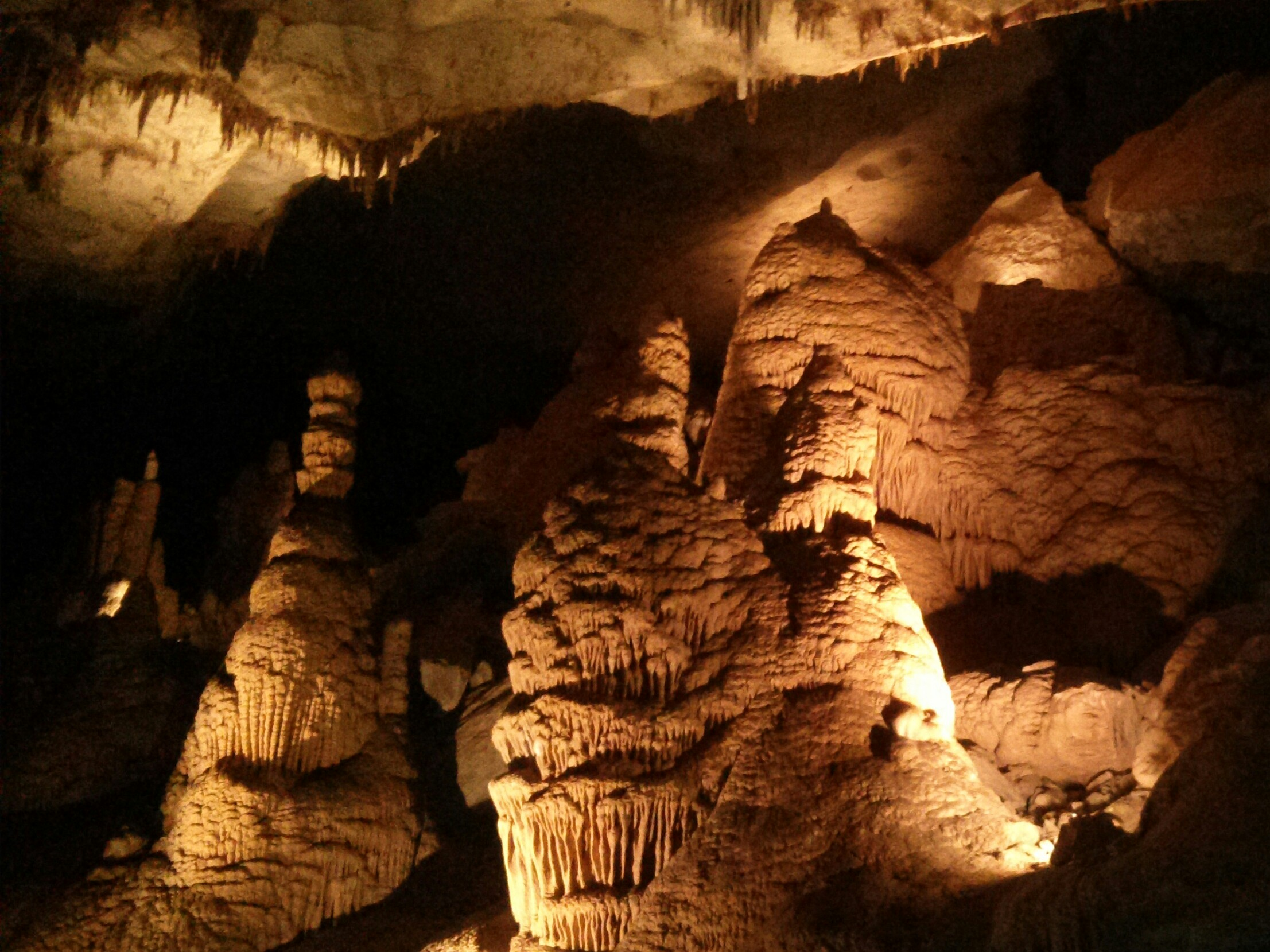
- Cumberland Caverns - Three Chessmen
- Interactive map of Cumberland Caverns
- Location: McMinnville, Tennessee, US
- Coordinates: 35°40′09″N 85°40′51″W
- Length: 27.7 miles (45 km)
- Discovery: 1810 by Aaron Higginbotham
- Geology: Monteagle Limestone
- Entrances: 3
- Entrances list: Higginbotham Cave, Henshaw Cave, Onyx Curtain
- Access: restricted
- Show cave opened: July 4th, 1956
- Lighting: electric
- Website: cumberlandcaverns.com

Cumberland Caverns is a national natural landmark and show cave located in Warren County, Tennessee, near McMinnville. It is the third longest cave in Tennessee and the 24th longest cave in the United States.

== History ==
The caverns' main entrance was discovered by Aaron Higginbotham in 1810, while surveying his land on Cardwell Mountain in what is now Warren County. According to legend, Higginbotham was the first man to enter the cave and was lost for three days after his torch went out. It was named Higgenbotham Cave in his honor. Another smaller cave, also located on Cardwell Mountain, was discovered about this time and named Henshaw Cave. Although not nearly as big as Higginbotham Cave, Henshaw Cave proved to be a source of saltpeter (the main ingredient of gunpowder) and was operated as a saltpeter mine during perhaps both the War of 1812 and the Civil War. In 1869 Shelah Waters, a tax revenuer, explored the cave extensively.

Higginbotham Cave became a favorite spot for local adventurers during the 19th century. In the early 1940s, members of the National Speleological Society (NSS) began to explore Higgenbotham Cave and greatly increased its known extent. In 1953, a connection between Henshaw Cave and Higgenbotham Cave was discovered by author Tom Barr and local cavers S.R. "Tank" Gorin and Dale Smith. This connection was named the Meatgrinder because of its small size and shape. Soon afterward, Tank and a caver from Indiana named Roy Davis leased the cave from its owner, A.W. Powell, and developed it into a commercial cave. The cave opened under the name Cumberland Caverns on July 4, 1956, and has been open to the public since that time. In 1981, Davis bought a pipe organ and chandelier from Loew's Metropolitan Theatre in Brooklyn and installed them in the cave. The cavern was featured alongside Cathedral Caverns in the 1984 British-American film What Waits Below directed by Don Sharp. In 1991 the American rock band Chagall Guevara filmed a music video for the song "Violent Blue" in the cave.

Today, Cumberland Caverns, Inc. offers year-round commercial tours of the cave, claiming it is the longest show cave in Tennessee. Tours include a daytime walking tour, adventure tours, overnight stays, and educational field trips. Weddings, banquets, birthday parties, and Christmas parties are also hosted. Before reaching the cave, tourists pass through a gift shop that sells tour tickets, souvenirs, and novelty items.

== Cumberland Caverns Live ==
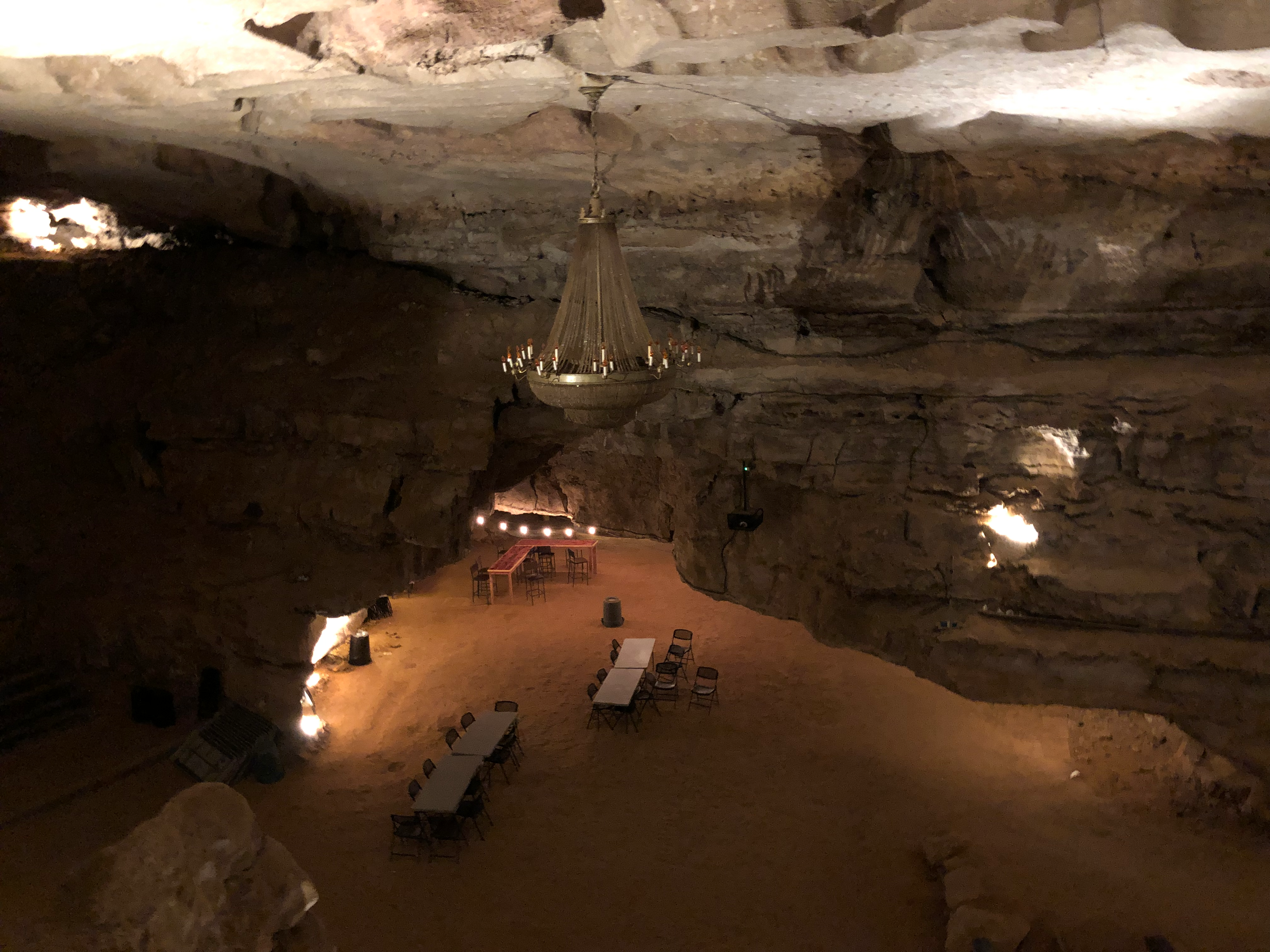
The Volcano Room in Cumberland Caverns

Cumberland Caverns was formerly home to Bluegrass Underground, a monthly music event that took place in the cave's Volcano Room from 2008-2017. The event has become a nationally syndicated program airing on PBS in 2011. In recent years, Bluegrass Underground moved to The Caverns in Pelham, Tennessee. Some of the more notable singers to play during the Bluegrass Underground era were Vince Gill, Ralph Stanley, Ricky Skaggs, Darrell Scott, and Justin Townes Earle. The Silver Jews' final performance was in the Volcano Room in January 2009.

Now, the Volcano Room is home to Cumberland Caverns Live and hosts a variety of concerts and live music, including acts like Jefferson Starship, The Allman Betts Band, Sister Hazel, Kip Moore, Diamond Rio, and Deer Tick (band).

== Geology ==
Cumberland Caverns formed in Mississippian Monteagle Limestone on Cardwell Mountain, a western offshoot of the Cumberland Plateau. The cave is home to stalagmites, stalactites, helictites, flowstone, cave pearls, botryoidal coral, gypsum flowers, needles, and pure white gypsum snow, as well as a variety of cave life.

Areas of interest within the cave include:

- The "Volcano Room," where many of the cave's commercial events are hosted.
- "Monument Pillar," a large column considered by many to be one of the most beautiful single speleothems in Tennessee caving.
- A passageway known as "the Dragon's Back" due to its winding spine-like walkways of anthropogenic mud knobs.
- The "Lemon Squeeze," so named because its widest point is only 11 inches (280 mm).
- "Bubblegum Alley," a passageway with standing water and very sticky mud.
- "The Hall of the Mountain King," whose dimensions (nearly 2 football fields in length) make it the largest in the cave.
- The "Saltpeter Room," where the ruins of a Civil War era Confederate saltpeter mine lay intact.
