= Rocky River (Tennessee) =

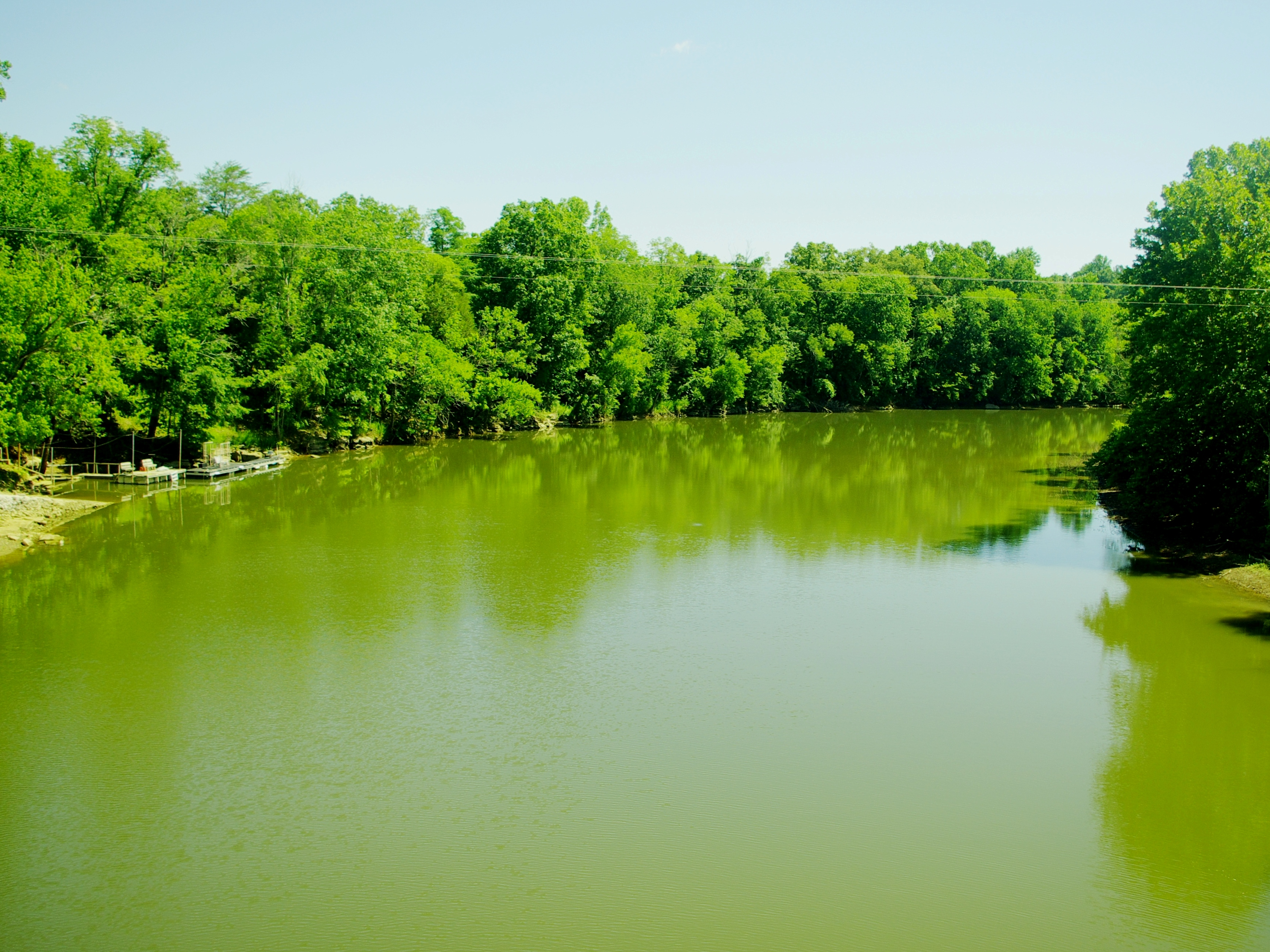
- View from the Bone Cave Road bridge

Location
- Country: United States
- State: Tennessee

Physical characteristics
- Source: Jakes Mountain in Sequatchie County
  - coordinates: 35°31′57″N 85°29′10″W
  - elevation: 1,880 ft (570 m)
- Mouth: Great Falls Lake (Caney Fork) at Rock Island
  - coordinates: 35°47′37″N 85°36′9″W
  - elevation: 804 ft (245 m)
- Length: 31 mi (50 km)
- Basin size: 111 mi^{2} (290 km^{2})

The Rocky River is a 31.0-mile-long (49.9 km) stream in the east-central portion of Middle Tennessee in the United States. It is a tributary of the Caney Fork River, and is part of the Cumberland, Ohio and Mississippi watersheds. The lower portion of the river is part of the reservoir created by Great Falls Dam, which is located near the river's confluence with the Caney Fork.

== Course ==
The Rocky River rises on the slopes of Jakes Mountain, a 2,204-foot (672 m) summit north of the Cagle community atop the Cumberland Plateau in Sequatchie County. Just below its source, the stream enters its Studer Lake impoundment as it flows northward through a rugged area of abandoned surface mines. Beyond this lake, the river crosses into Van Buren County, where it continues northward through rugged hills.

After passing the historic "Rocky River Crossing" (once part of the Trail of Tears) along Pleasant Hill Cemetery Road, the river begins its descent to the Highland Rim, losing 900 feet in elevation in less than four miles before steadying in the White Hill area. Flanked by the walls of the Cumberland Plateau and Barnett Mountain, the river continues northward through the Riverview and Laurelburg communities. At the latter, the river veers westward toward Warren County, then again turns northward, forming the boundary between Warren and Van Buren for the remainder of its course.

Just before reaching the Goodbars community, the river passes under State Highway 30 (Spencer Road). Beyond Goodbars, the river flows through a series of oxbow bends, one of which nearly forms a meander cutoff. After passing under Bone Cave Road and U.S. Highway 70, the river flows just east of the Rock Island community as it enters the slack waters of Great Falls Lake. The river empties into the Caney Fork about a mile upstream from Great Falls Dam. Its confluence with the Caney Fork marks a three-way junction between Warren, Van Buren, and White counties.

== Watershed ==
The drainage area of the Rocky River covers 111 square miles. The Tennessee Valley Divide, which separates the Cumberland and Tennessee watersheds, crosses Jakes Mountain a few hundred yards south of the source of the Rocky River. Streams on the north side of the mountain flow into the Rocky, while streams on the south side are part of the Sequatchie River watershed. A string of ridges extending from the Cumberland Plateau, among them Long Mountain and Barnett Mountain, split the watershed of the Rocky from the watershed of the Collins River to the west.

Important tributaries of the Rocky include Harper Branch, Sycamore Branch, and Dyer Gulch Creek, which flow into the river from the west, and Samples Fork, Rocky Branch, and Pine Branch, which join the river from the east. Laurel Creek, which empties into the river's eastern bank just downstream from Goodbars, drains part of the town of Spencer.

== History ==
Rock Island, a small island at the confluence of the Rocky River and Caney Fork, was an important early landmark and river ford for settlers in the eastern Highland Rim region. Two Indian trails, the Chickamauga Trail (later the Old Kentucky Road) and the Black Fox Trail, intersected near the island. Historian J. G. M. Ramsey reports a battle taking place at the island in 1793, near the end of the Cherokee–American wars.

During the 19th and early 20th centuries, Higgenbotham's Trace (or Rainey's Turnpike), a major road connecting McMinnville with the Sequatchie Valley, crossed the Rocky River near Pleasant Hill Cemetery, just north of Van Buren-Sequatchie county line. In 1838, the northern route of the Trail of Tears, the path over which the Cherokee were removed from the eastern mountains to Oklahoma, followed this road. While the procession camped at the Rocky River, the Cherokee leader Junaluska and several supporters deserted and attempted to return to the east. They were eventually arrested and incarcerated. The Rocky River Crossing and the adjacent roadbed, which look much as they did 170 years ago, have since been added to the National Register of Historic Places.

Historian Arthur Weir Crouch reported several early fords along the Rocky River, most notably Brights Ford at the river's Laurel Creek confluence, and Hash Ford, or Indian Ford, near its mouth. A wooden bridge was built at the latter ford in the mid-19th century, but was destroyed by a flood in 1872. As part of its Great Falls Dam project, the Tennessee Electric Power Company built the Yost Bridge about a mile above the river's mouth in 1915, and the Blanks Bridge about three miles above the river's mouth in 1916. A bridge for Tennessee Highway 30 was built in the early 1920s.

== Ecology and habitat improvement ==
Siltation from surface mining conducted in the upper Rocky River basin during the early and mid-20th century damaged several sections of the river, and threatened two federally-listed species that live in the river, the bluemask darter and the slender chub. Restoration efforts have focused on the erection of livestock exclusion fences to create a reforested riparian zone along the river, and backfilling and revegetating abandoned surface mines.

== See also ==
- List of rivers of Tennessee
