= Bluegrass Underground =

- Also known as: The Caverns Sessions
- Genre: Music
- Created by: Todd Mayo
- Directed by: James Yockey
- Country of origin: United States
- Original language: English
- No. of seasons: 10
- No. of episodes: 82

Production
- Executive producers: Todd Mayo; Todd Jarrell
- Producers: Todd Jarrell; Todd Mayo
- Cinematography: TNDV
- Editor: Todd Jarrell
- Running time: 30 minutes
- Production companies: Todd Squared, LLC

Original release
- Network: PBS
- Release: September 7, 2011 – June 5, 2021

Bluegrass Underground was a musical television show taped live at The Caverns in the base of Monteagle Mountain. From 2008 to 2018, it was held in Cumberland Caverns. In 2011, it became a nationally syndicated television show airing on PBS. The program also aired weekly on the AM radio station WSM. On September 10, 2022, at the beginning of what would have been its eleventh season, Bluegrass Underground was rebranded as The Caverns Sessions to acknowledge the broader range of music featured in the program.

== Awards and nominations ==
Bluegrass Underground season two was awarded four Emmys (Mid-South) for Best Entertainment Program, Best Director/Program, Excellence in Audio, and Excellence in Lighting Design. That season's series was also Emmy-nominated for Best Photography/Program and Technical Achievement.

Bluegrass Underground Season One won the Emmy (Mid-South) for Lighting Design and in addition was nominated for EMMYs in the categories of Best Arts Program, Excellence in Audio, Best Photography/Program, and Technical Achievement. Bluegrass Underground Season One also was awarded by Cine Golden Eagle Award for professional non-fiction in spring 2012. It received a Telly Silver Award that same year.

== See also ==
- List of bluegrass music festivals
- List of folk festivals
