= National Register of Historic Places listings in Warren County, Tennessee =

Location of Warren County in Tennessee

This is a list of the National Register of Historic Places listings in Warren County, Tennessee.

This is intended to be a complete list of the properties and districts on the National Register of Historic Places in Warren County, Tennessee, United States. Latitude and longitude coordinates are provided for many National Register properties and districts; these locations may be seen together in a map.

There are 23 properties and districts listed on the National Register in the county.

Contents: Counties in Tennessee
Anderson – Bedford – Benton – Bledsoe – Blount – Bradley – Campbell – Cannon – Carroll – Carter – Cheatham – Chester – Claiborne – Clay – Cocke – Coffee – Crockett – Cumberland – Davidson – Decatur – DeKalb – Dickson – Dyer – Fayette – Fentress – Franklin – Gibson – Giles – Grainger – Greene – Grundy – Hamblen – Hamilton – Hancock – Hardeman – Hardin – Hawkins – Haywood – Henderson – Henry – Hickman – Houston – Humphreys – Jackson – Jefferson – Johnson – Knox – Lake – Lauderdale – Lawrence – Lewis – Lincoln – Loudon – Macon – Madison – Marion – Marshall – Maury – McMinn – McNairy – Meigs – Monroe – Montgomery – Moore – Morgan – Obion – Overton – Perry – Pickett – Polk – Putnam – Rhea – Roane – Robertson – Rutherford – Scott – Sequatchie – Sevier – Shelby – Smith – Stewart – Sullivan – Sumner – Tipton – Trousdale – Unicoi – Union – Van Buren – Warren – Washington – Wayne – Weakley – White – Williamson – Wilson

This National Park Service list is complete through NPS recent listings posted September 26, 2025.

== Current listings ==
| | Name on the Register | Image | Date listed | Location | City or town | Description |
|---|---|---|---|---|---|---|
| 1 | Black House | Black House | November 17, 1983 (#83004310) | 301 W. Main St. 35°40′52″N 85°46′34″W | McMinnville | |
| 2 | Cardwell Mountain | Cardwell Mountain | December 14, 1978 (#78002646) | 2.5 miles south-southeast of Union; 35°40′56″N 85°40′49″W | Union | Believed to have been a significant landmark among early Native Americans living in the area; Cumberland Caverns located on the mountain. The mountain is to become a state archaeological park. |
| 3 | City Cemetery | City Cemetery | November 21, 2002 (#02001377) | S. High St. 35°40′41″N 85°46′36″W | McMinnville | Established in 1813; last burial in 1938 |
| 4 | Falconhurst | Falconhurst | August 26, 1982 (#82004062) | North of McMinnville on Faulkner Springs Rd. 35°42′57″N 85°46′03″W | McMinnville vicinity | Built by Asa Faulkner in 1850 |
| 5 | Clay Faulkner House | Clay Faulkner House | March 5, 1992 (#92000137) | Junction of Faulkner Springs and Bluff Springs Rds. 35°43′01″N 85°45′42″W | McMinnville vicinity | Built in 1896 by entrepreneur Clay Faulkner (1845–1916); open to the public since 1993 as a museum under its original name, Falcon Rest Mansion |
| 6 | First Methodist Church | First Methodist Church | November 15, 2002 (#02001341) | 200 W. Main St. 35°40′54″N 85°46′29″W | McMinnville | Built in 1886; congregation dates to the 1830s |
| 7 | First Presbyterian Church | First Presbyterian Church | September 13, 1995 (#95001061) | 205 W. Main St. 35°40′52″N 85°46′31″W | McMinnville | Built in 1871; congregation founded 1839 |
| 8 | Great Falls Cotton Mill | Great Falls Cotton Mill | August 26, 1982 (#82004063) | West of Rock Island off U.S. Route 70S; 35°48′09″N 85°37′31″W | Rock Island | |
| 9 | Great Falls Hydroelectric Station | Great Falls Hydroelectric Station | July 5, 1990 (#90001004) | Off U.S. Route 70S at mile 91.1 on the Caney Fork; 35°48′07″N 85°37′19″W | Rock Island | Extends into White County |
| 10 | William H. and Edgar Magness Community House and Library | William H. and Edgar Magness Community House and Library | November 4, 1993 (#93001177) | 118 W. Main St. 35°40′53″N 85°46′27″W | McMinnville | Built by William H. Magness as a gift to the community in 1931; designed by George D. Waller |
| 11 | Martin-Miller Farm | Martin-Miller Farm | July 22, 2005 (#05000727) | 1597 Old Rock Island Rd. 35°44′26″N 85°40′19″W | Rowland Station | Includes the circa-1820 Rock Martin House |
| 12 | McMinnville Hydroelectric Station | McMinnville Hydroelectric Station | February 26, 1990 (#90000307) | State Route 55 Business at the Barren Fork; 35°40′29″N 85°46′36″W | McMinnville | Built in 1902 by the Walling Power and Light Company after an earlier dam at the site was destroyed by a flood |
| 13 | My Grandfather's House | My Grandfather's House | April 4, 1985 (#85000702) | U.S. Route 70S; 35°41′35″N 85°48′14″W | McMinnville | Log house built in 1817 by Abner Womack; originally located near Green's Crossroads |
| 14 | Myers Mound | Myers Mound | December 14, 1978 (#78002645) | Address Restricted | McMinnville vicinity | |
| 15 | Northcutt Plantation | Northcutt Plantation | May 12, 1975 (#75001795) | 7 miles southwest of McMinnville off State Route 108 on Wheeler Lane; 35°36′19″N 85°51′04″W | McMinnville vicinity | |
| 16 | Oakham | Oakham | August 11, 1983 (#83003072) | U.S. Route 70S; 35°41′54″N 85°44′38″W | McMinnville | Built in the Federal style by Phillip Hoodenpyl for planter William Black c. 1835, later remodeled in Greek Revival style; used as Elizabeth J. Magness Home for the Aged and Indigent, 1930s–1980s |
| 17 | Philadelphia Church of Christ | Philadelphia Church of Christ | November 17, 1988 (#88002537) | Vervilla Rd. 35°35′33″N 85°52′19″W | Vervilla | Officially called "Old Philadelphia Meeting House"; built 1830, restored 1985–1986 |
| 18 | Spring Street Service Station | Spring Street Service Station | November 21, 2001 (#01001263) | 200 N. Spring St. 35°40′55″N 85°46′17″W | McMinnville | Built in the 1930s for Pure Oil, designed by Carl August Petersen; now an art gallery |
| 19 | Stone-Pennebaker House | Stone-Pennebaker House | November 17, 1988 (#88002648) | 116 Towles Ave; 35°41′34″N 85°46′16″W | McMinnville | Built mid-19th century by Dillard Stone, later occupied by Samuel Pennebaker, who had married Stone's widow, Harriette; current address 116 Towles Ave. |
| 20 | US Post Office-Main | US Post Office-Main | December 3, 1985 (#85003089) | 102 E. Court Sq. 35°40′54″N 85°46′20″W | McMinnville | Built in 1931 and designed under the supervision of James A. Wetmore |
| 21 | Edgar Walling House | Edgar Walling House | July 5, 1996 (#96000749) | 406 N. Spring St. 35°41′03″N 85°46′12″W | McMinnville | Built in 1912 by local banker Edgar Walling |
| 22 | Joseph Daniel Walling House | Joseph Daniel Walling House | August 6, 1980 (#80003877) | 101 Walling Hill Rd; 35°40′16″N 85°46′37″W | McMinnville | Greek Revival-style house built for Walling by Dillard George Stone in 1856 |
| 23 | Webb Hotel | | March 27, 2020 (#100005145) | 281 Great Falls Rd. 35°47′43″N 85°36′57″W | Rock Island | Craftsman style house constructed in 1909 to accommodate the rising demand for tourism in Rock Island. Known for its homestyle dinners on Sunday afternoons. Was frequented by country music star and member of the Grand Ole Opry, Uncle Dave Macon. |

== See also ==
- List of National Historic Landmarks in Tennessee
- National Register of Historic Places listings in Tennessee
