= Hugh Cathcart Thompson =

American architect

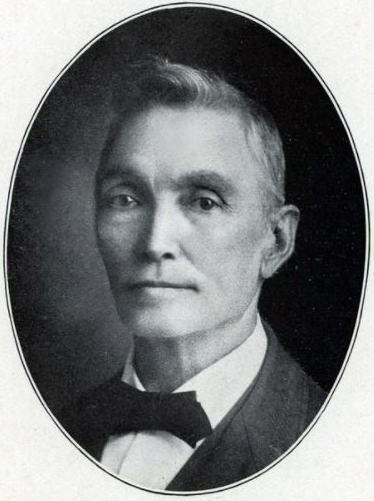
- Born: 1829
- Died: 1919 (aged 89–90)
- Occupation: Architect

Hugh Cathcart Thompson (1829–1919) was an American architect from Tennessee.

== Early life ==
High Cathcart Thomson was born in 1829.

== Career ==
Thompson designed fifty-six buildings during his career as an architect in Nashville, Tennessee. Only nine are still standing.

In 1887, he designed Baxter Court for Jere Baxter (1852–1904), located at 307–311 on Church Street in Nashville, Tennessee. It was home to the Chamber of Commerce. However, it was demolished in 1970. In 1889, he designed the First Methodist Church in McMinnville, Tennessee, which is listed on the National Register of Historic Places listings in Warren County, Tennessee.

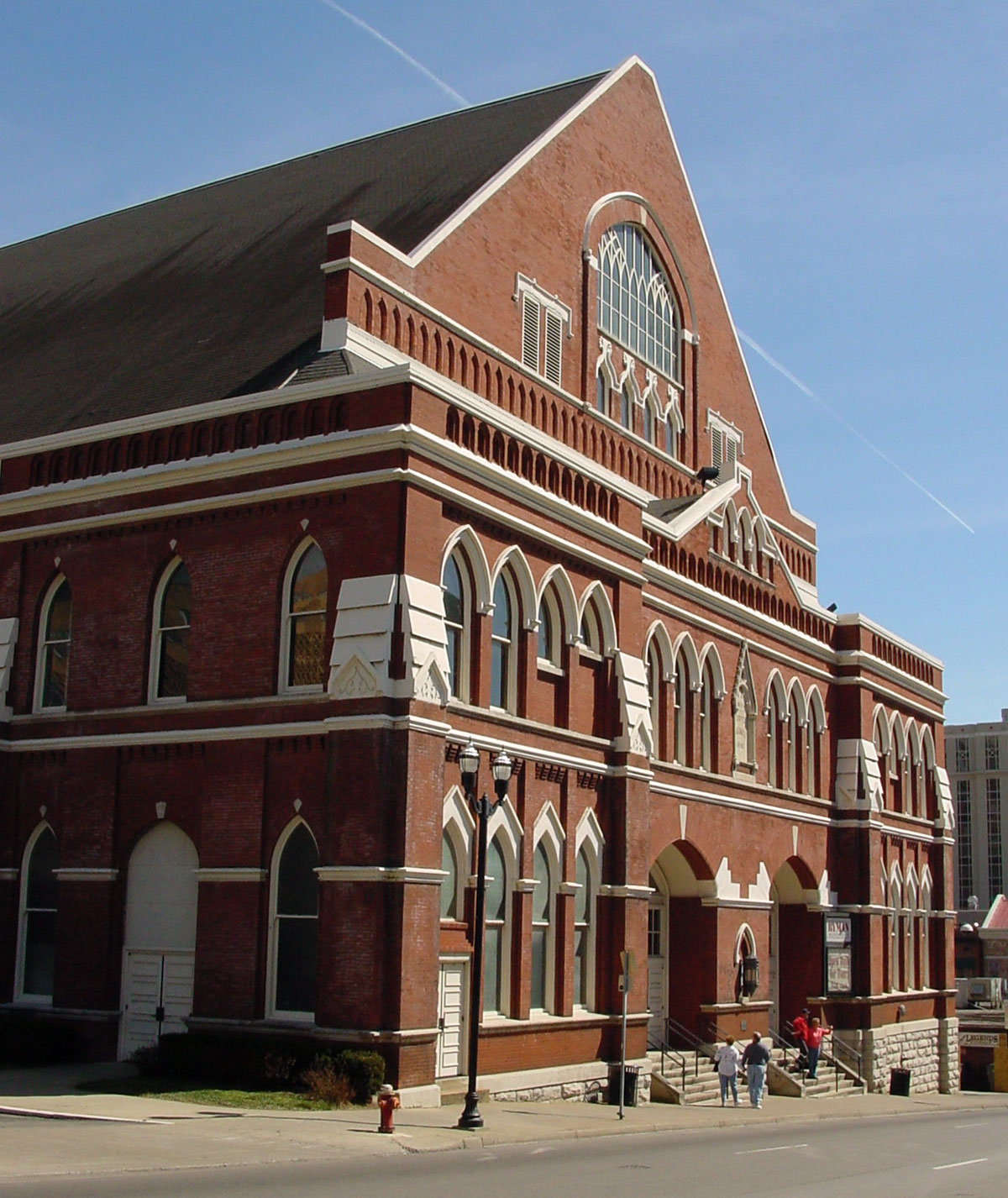
Ryman Auditorium in Nashville, Tennessee.

In 1890 Thompson designed the Ambrose House, still situated in East End in the Historic Edgefield District of Nashville. Now on the National Register of Historic Places, the house was named for the Ambrose family of the Ambrose Printing Company (circa 1865) and was designed as a family home. Ambrose House passed through many owners in the late 20th Century, becoming a boarding house before sitting empty. By 2003 the house was in an advanced state of disrepair and scheduled for demolition when Gordon Gilbreath of Dovetail Construction saved the structure. Ambrose house operated as a wedding venue before being restored to a family home in 2016, it is considered one of East Nashville's most iconic homes. In 1891, Thompson designed the Ryman Auditorium at 116 5th Avenue North in Nashville. It is listed on the National Register of Historic Places listings in Davidson County, Tennessee. That same year, he designed the Utopia Hotel located at 206 4th Avenue North in Nashville, also listed on the National Register of Historic Places. Additionally, he designed the Community Baptist Church on the corner of South Douglas and Elliott Avenues in the Waverly Place Historic District, a neighbourhood in Nashville listed on the National Register of Historic Places.

Thompson also designed the private residence of Volney James on the southwest corner of Fatherland and Fifth Streets in East Nashville, which was demolished in 1963.

== Death ==
Thompson died in 1919.

== Secondary source ==
- William W. Howell. Hugh Cathcart Thompson, Native Tennessee Architect. Knoxville, Tennessee: University of Tennessee Press. 1975.
