= Falcon Rest =

Historic house in Tennessee, United States

- Clay Faulkner House
- U.S. National Register of Historic Places
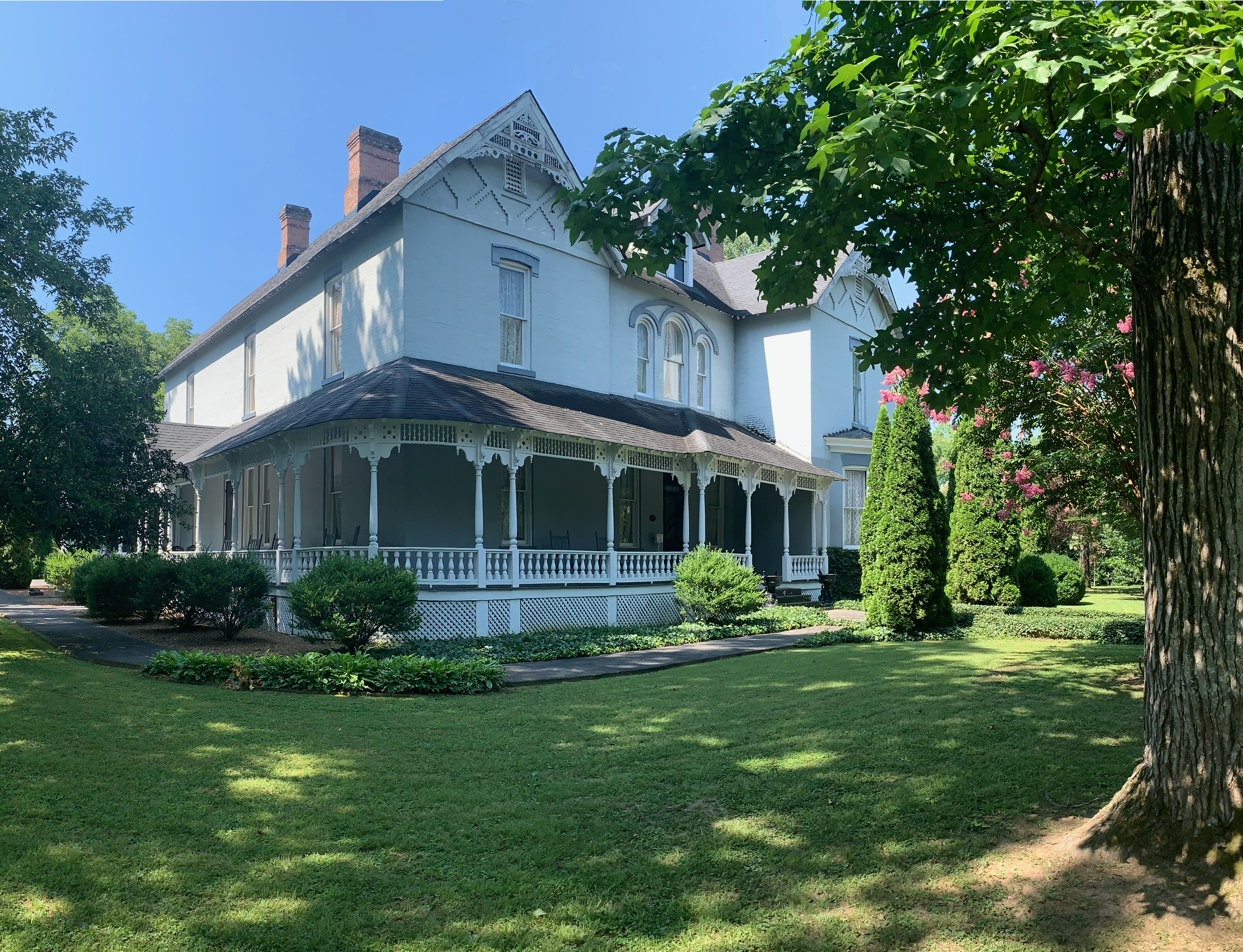
- The house and gardens

- Location within Tennessee Location within the United States
- Location: 2645 Faulkner Springs Road; McMinnville, Tennessee 37110
- Coordinates: 35°43′1″N 85°45′42″W
- Area: 1.6 acres (0.65 ha)
- Built: 1896
- Architectural style: Queen Anne
- NRHP reference No.: 92000137
- Added to NRHP: March 5, 1992

Falcon Rest, also known as the Clay Faulkner House, is a historic house in Warren County, Tennessee near McMinnville. It was built in 1896-1897 for Clay Faulkner, the son of politician and mill owner Asa Faulkner, who lived at Falconhurst.

== History ==
Faulkner lived in the house with his wife, Mary King Saunders, and their five children. He was the owner of the Great Falls Cotton Mill . From 1929 to 1941, the house was owned by Dr. Herman Reynolds, who welcomed patients into his home. McMinnville Mayor W. V. Jones was the owner from 1943 to 1945. The house was later used as a hospital, until it was remodelled as a private residence by the Grissoms and the McGlothins in the 1980s.

In 1993 it became a bed and breakfast. Since 2000, guest rooms are instead available on the grounds and the house functions as a historic attraction offering historic tours, events, and facility rentals.

== Architecture ==
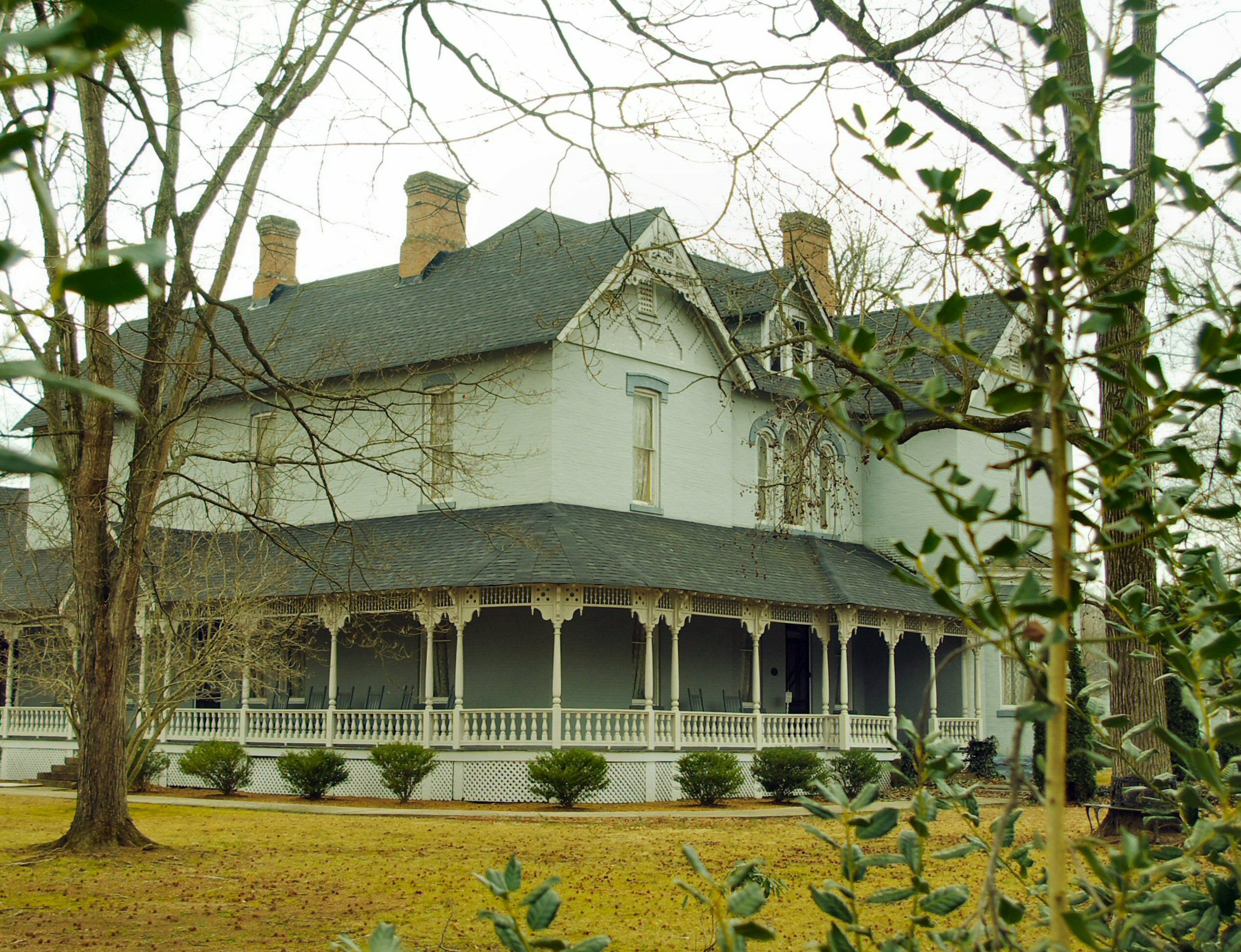
The extensive porch

The house was designed in the Queen Anne architectural style with a gingerbread porch extending from the front around one side of the house. It has been listed on the National Register of Historic Places since 1992. Some people claim the house is haunted.
