= Smartt, Tennessee =

- Unincorporated community
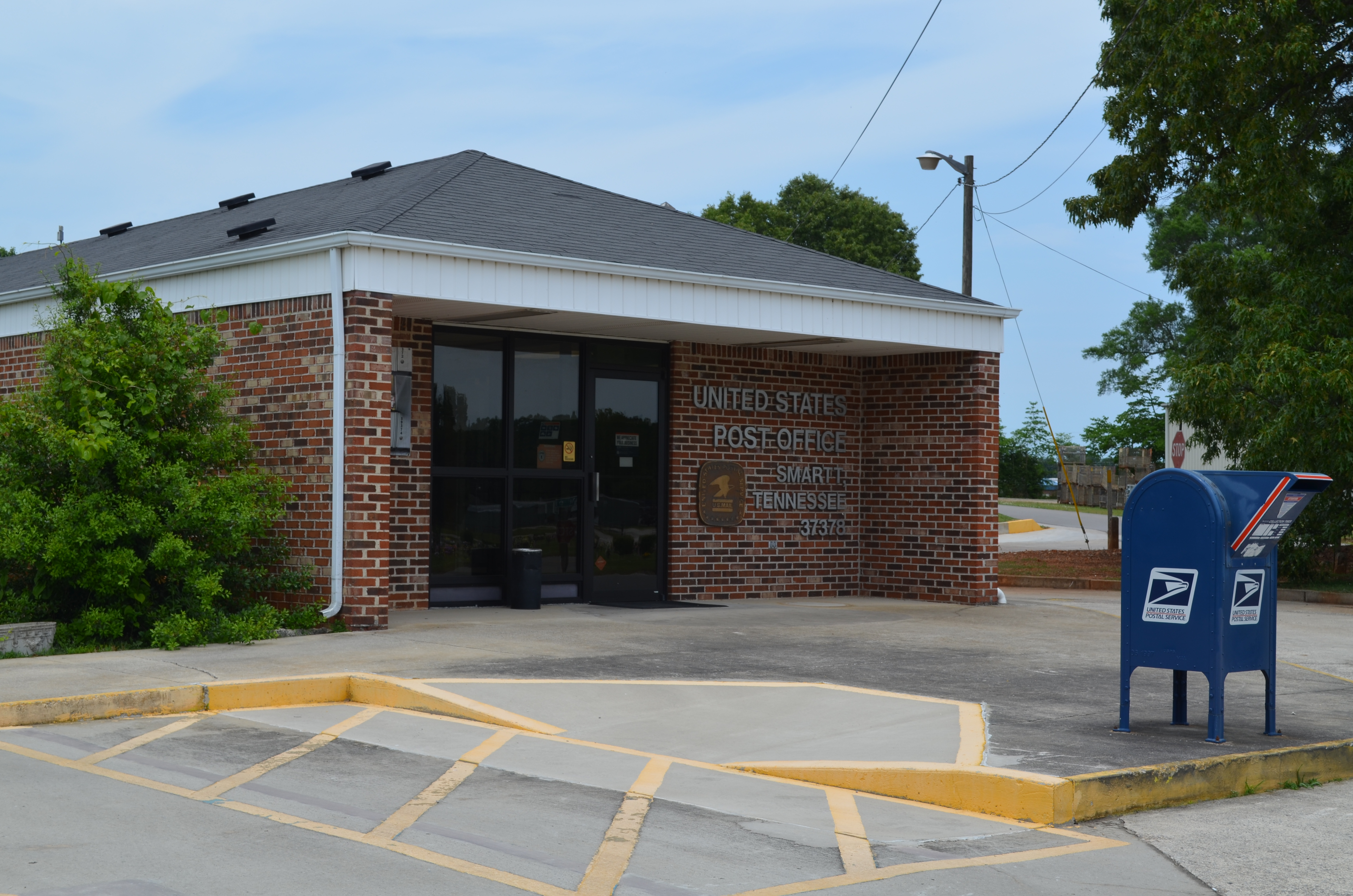
- U.S. Post Office in Smartt, Tennessee

- Location within Tennessee Location within the United States
- Coordinates: 35°38′25″N 85°50′12″W
- Country: United States
- State: Tennessee
- County: Warren
- Elevation: 991 ft (302 m)
- Time zone: UTC-6 (Central (CST))
  - Summer (DST): UTC-5 (CDT)
- ZIP code: 37378
- Area code: 931
- GNIS feature ID: 1647825

Smartt is an unincorporated community in Warren County, Tennessee, United States. Smartt is located along Tennessee State Route 55 and the Caney Fork and Western Railroad 4.5 miles (7.2 km) southwest of McMinnville. Smartt has a post office with ZIP code 37378.

Smartt has been said to have the strangest town name in the state of Tennessee.
