= Black House (McMinnville, Tennessee) =

Historic house in Tennessee, United States

- U.S. National Register of Historic Places
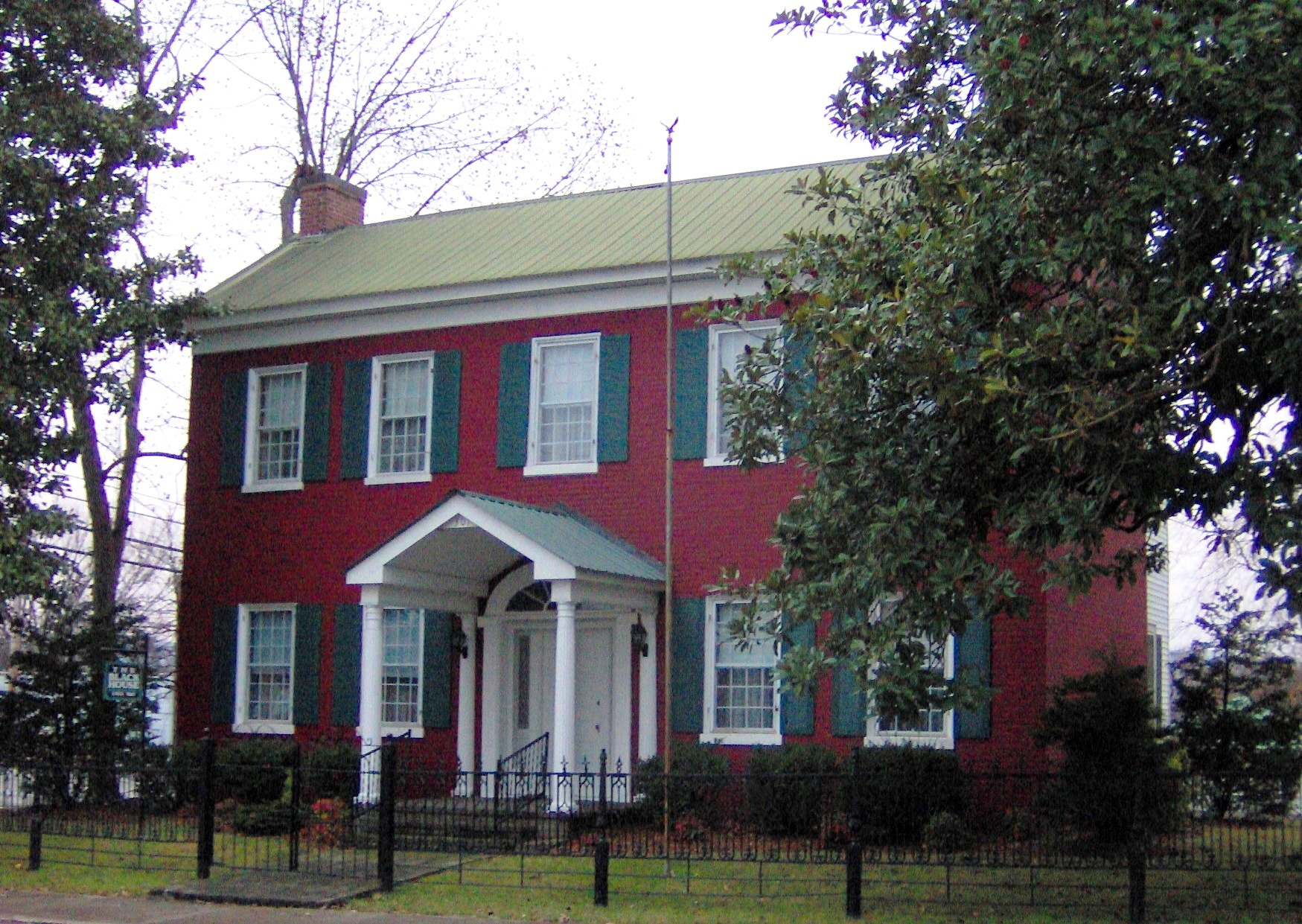
- Black House in 2008

- Location within Tennessee Location within the United States
- Location: 301 West Main Street, McMinnville, Tennessee
- Coordinates: 35°40′52″N 85°46′34″W
- Area: less than one acre
- Built: 1825
- Architectural style: Federal
- NRHP reference No.: 83004310
- Added to NRHP: November 17, 1983

Black House is a historic house in McMinnville, Tennessee, United States.

== History ==
The house was built circa 1825 for Jesse Coffee. From 1830 to 1849, it belonged to Samuel Hervey Laughlin, the editor of the Nashville Banner and the Nashville Union, two newspapers based in Nashville, Tennessee, who served as a member of the Tennessee Senate. It was acquired by Thomas Black, the mayor of McMinnville, in 1874, and it remained in the Black family until the 1980s.

== Architectural significance ==
The house was designed in the Federal architectural style. It has been listed on the National Register of Historic Places since November 17, 1983.
