= McMinnville Opera House =

Former theater in McMinnville, Tennessee, United States

Coordinates: 35.6813°N 85.7712°W

The McMinnville Opera House, also known as Hawchins Opera House, was a landmark structure in McMinnville, Tennessee, that was destroyed by a fire in 2008. It was built in September 1888 by African American entrepreneur William Hawchins. The building had businesses on the first floor, the main opera house on the second, and Mr. Hawchin's apartment on the third. The building was beautifully decorated with many ornaments, and a metropolitan opera house look for its time. This building helped the growth of McMinnville, making the town become known as a "Cultural Center".

== 20th century ==
In the 20th century, opera houses slowly declined in popularity. As a result, citizens tore off the Victorian exterior ornaments and turned the building into shops. Later on, the building served as King's Department Store.

== Restoration ==
In 2004, the City of McMinnville decided to bring back the old charm of downtown McMinnville. The State of Tennessee Downtown Historical Preservation Society gave each county in the state funding to revive its downtown. Thus, the city started the "Revitalization of Historical Downtown McMinnville Project." The project was completed in 2006.

During this project, many buildings were left as they were, tidied up, and turned into shops. Many restoration efforts did not succeed. But there were a few that did: The New York Grill, Capalano's (Cap's), Highland Rim Music, and many antique shops. The rest of the abandoned buildings were either put up for rent or were scheduled for renovations, many of which are still occurring today. The McMinnville Opera House was one of many to be chosen to be renovated. 15 years prior, the second floor had previously been renovated into a townhouse; this had restored the solid wood floors and exposed the brick walls. The street level underwent a full restoration, preserving the cabinets and oak flooring. Showcases displaying McMinnville memorabilia as well as Civil War, World War II, and Vietnam War items of local interest were on display. A research-study area was set aside for public use. The museum was scheduled to open July 5, which was the set date for the county's Bicentennial Celebration. Various veterans of different wars donated their personal possessions for this purpose.

== Destructive fire ==
On Saturday, March 29, 2008, at around midnight, the building was destroyed by a fire. On June 15, 2008, the Southern Standard reported that the cause of the fire had been arson. The Dixons, the building owners, had several reports of suspected vandalism and had installed cameras around their building. Though there were a few young people smoking in the back, the Dixons did not conclude that they were the cause of the fire. There were no leads on the identity of the arsonist(s).
