= Tennessee State Route 55 =

Highway in Tennessee

State Route 55
- SR 55; primary in red, business route in blue

Route information
- Maintained by TDOT
- Length: 49.3 mi (79.3 km)
- Existed: October 1, 1923–present

Major junctions
- West end: SR 50 in Lynchburg
- US 41A in Tullahoma; US 41 in Manchester; I-24 in Manchester
- East end: US 70S / SR 380 in McMinnville

Location
- Country: United States
- State: Tennessee
- Counties: Moore, Coffee, Warren

Highway system
- Tennessee State Routes; Interstate; US; State
← I-55	→ SR 56

State Route 55 (SR 55) is an east–west highway in Middle Tennessee. The road begins at SR 50 in Lynchburg and ends at U.S. Route 70S (US 70S) and SR 380 in McMinnville. The current length is 49.3 mi (79.3 km). SR 55 heads northeast from Lynchburg to Tullahoma as a two-lane road. In Tullahoma, the route runs concurrent with US 41A. From here, SR 55 heads northeast as a multilane highway to Manchester, where it intersects US 41 and Interstate 24 (I-24). The route continues northeast, serving Summitville and Morrison before it reaches McMinnville.

== Route description ==
=== Moore County ===
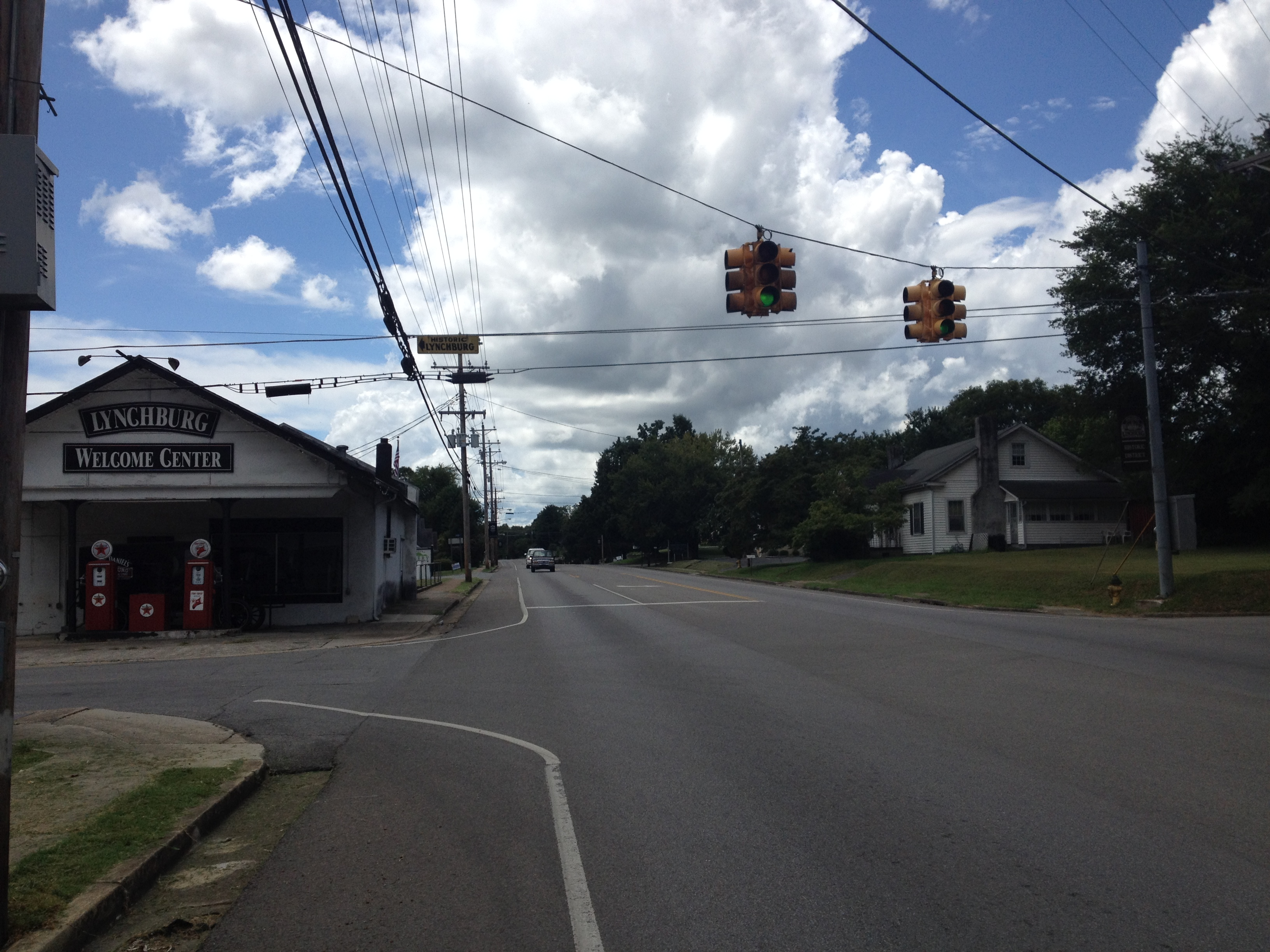
SR 55 westbound in Lynchburg

SR 55 begins at an intersection with SR 50 in Lynchburg, Moore County, heading northeast on two-lane undivided Fayetteville Highway, a primary state route. Past the terminus, Fayetteville Highway continues as part of SR 50 toward Fayetteville. From the western terminus, SR 55 heads through a mix of farm fields and woods with some development, crossing the East Fork Mulberry Creek. The road intersects the eastern terminus of SR 129 and becomes Majors Boulevard, running past a few businesses. The route curves to the east-northeast and gains a center left-turn lane as it passes through residential areas with some commercial development to the north of downtown Lynchburg. SR 55 becomes Lynchburg Highway and turns northeast, crossing the East Fork Mulberry Creek and passing to the northwest of the Jack Daniel Distillery. The road narrows to two lanes and runs through wooded areas to the east of the creek. The creek heads farther to the west and the route continues through farm fields with some trees and development, coming to an intersection with the southern terminus of SR 82. Past this intersection, SR 55 heads north-northeast through farmland with some woods and homes. The road bends north and enters more wooded areas with some fields, making a turn to the east.

=== Coffee County ===
Farther east, SR 55 leaves Lynchburg/Moore County and enters Tullahoma in Coffee County, where it becomes Wilson Avenue and runs through more woodland with some farm fields. The road passes to the north of residential neighborhoods and reaches an intersection with SR 130. At this point, SR 130 joins SR 55 for a concurrency and the highway widens to a five-lane road with a center left-turn lane, running near more homes. The road narrows to three lanes and continues east into commercial areas, curving northeast and coming to a junction with US 41A (SR 16). At this point, SR 55 and SR 130 turn southeast to join US 41A (SR 16) on North Jackson Street, a five-lane road with a center left-turn lane that is lined with businesses. The road passes through downtown Tullahoma and becomes South Jackson Street upon crossing Lincoln Street. The highway runs past a mix of homes and businesses before SR 55 and SR 130 split from US 41A (SR 16) at Carroll Street. Here, SR 130 turns southwest onto West Carroll Street and SR 55 turns northeast onto East Carroll Street. SR 55 becomes a four-lane undivided road and comes to a bridge over CSX's Chattanooga Subdivision railroad line before it runs past businesses as a five-lane road with a center left-turn lane. The road crosses a railroad spur and becomes a four-lane divided highway that continues through commercial areas as it runs a short distance to the southeast of the Caney Fork and Western Railroad. The route passes through a mix of residential and commercial development and wooded areas before it leaves Tullahoma and becomes New Manchester Highway.

SR 55 continues parallel to the railroad tracks and runs through forested areas with some development to the northwest of the grounds of the Arnold Engineering Development Complex. Farther northeast, the road runs through a mix of farm fields and woods with some homes and businesses. The route becomes New Tullahoma Highway and runs through more rural areas before it enters Manchester. Here, SR 55 becomes McArthur Street, a five-lane road with a center left-turn lane, and heads north-northeast through residential and commercial areas. The road comes to an intersection with US 41 (SR 2) and becomes McMinnville Highway, running through wooded areas and development before turning into a four-lane divided highway and coming to an interchange with I-24. Past this interchange, the route passes businesses and transitions back into a five-lane road with a center left-turn lane, leaving Manchester. SR 55 runs through a mix of farmland and woodland with some homes and businesses. Farther along, the road becomes a four-lane divided highway and heads through more rural land, heading to the southeast of Summitville.

=== Warren County ===
SR 55 crosses into Warren County and becomes Manchester Highway, continuing northeast to an intersection with the western terminus of SR 379. SR 379 heads northeast into Morrison and SR 55 becomes a five-lane road with a center left-turn lane that bypasses Morrison to the southeast, running through farms and woods. The road crosses SR 287 in an area of businesses before it continues through more rural land and intersects the eastern terminus of SR 379 on the other side of Morrison. The route heads through a mix of farms, woods, and commercial development as it continues northeast. Farther northeast, SR 55 becomes a four-lane divided highway and comes to an interchange with SR 55 Bus., which heads northeast into McMinnville and provides access to SR 286, just after passing through Smartt. At this point, SR 55 forms the southwestern part of the McMinnville Bypass. The route follows the four-lane divided H.T. Pelham Memorial Parkway north and passes over the Caney Fork and Western Railroad before it curves northwest. The road runs through a mix of farmland and woodland with some nearby development and heads north, crossing the Barren Fork before curving to the northeast. SR 55 turns back to the north and comes to its eastern terminus at an interchange with US 70S (SR 1) and the western terminus of SR 380. At this point, US 70S (SR 1) continues east along the bypass around McMinnville.

The section of SR 55 between SR 50 and SR 82 in Lynchburg is designated a Tennessee Scenic Parkway.

== Junction list ==
County	Location	mi	km	Destinations	Notes
Moore	Lynchburg	0.0	0.0	SR 50 west (Fayetteville Highway) / SR 50 east (Winchester Highway) – Fayetteville, Winchester	Western terminus
Moore	Lynchburg	0.9	1.4	SR 129 west (Booneville Highway) – Petersburg	Eastern terminus of SR 129
Moore	Lynchburg	3.9	6.3	SR 82 north (Flat Creek Highway) – Shelbyville	Southern terminus of SR 82
Coffee	Tullahoma	12.6	20.3	SR 130 north (Old Shelbyville Highway) – Lynchburg, Shelbyville	West end of SR 130 overlap
Coffee	Tullahoma	13.7	22.0	US 41A north (SR 16 north / North Jackson Street) – Shelbyville	West end of US 41A/SR 16 overlap
Coffee	Tullahoma	14.7	23.7	US 41A south (SR 16 south / South Jackson Street) – Estill Springs, Decherd, Winchester SR 130 south (West Carroll Street) – Tims Ford State Park	east end of US 41A/SR 16/SR 130 overlap
Coffee	Manchester	26.0	41.8	US 41 (SR 2 / Hillsboro Boulevard) – Hillsboro, Murfreesboro, Monteagle	
Coffee	Manchester	27.0	43.5	I-24 – Chattanooga, Nashville	I-24 exit 111
Warren	Morrison	37.8	60.8	SR 379 east (West Maple Street) – Downtown Morrison	Western terminus of SR 379
Warren	Morrison	39.0	62.8	SR 287 (South Fair Street) – Downtown Morrison, Viola	At-grade intersection with traffic signal
Warren	Morrison	39.6	63.7	SR 379 west (East Maple Street) – Downtown Morrison	Eastern terminus of SR 379
Warren	McMinnville	45.8	73.7	SR 55 Bus. north (South Chancery Street) to SR 286 north (Morrison Street) / Vervilla Road – Downtown McMinnville	Interchange; Southern terminus of SR 55 Business and SR 286
Warren	McMinnville	47.6	76.6	T.R. and Martha Woods Bridge over the Barren Fork River	
Warren	McMinnville	49.3	79.3	US 70S / SR 380 east (SR 1 / West Main Street / Bobby Ray Memorial Parkway) – Woodbury, McMinnville, Doyle, Sparta	Interchange; End of SR 55; western terminus of SR 380; road continues as US 70S/SR 1
1.000 mi = 1.609 km; 1.000 km = 0.621 mi: Concurrency terminus

== Special routes ==
State Route 55 Business
- Location: McMinnville, Tennessee
- Length: 3.20 mi (5.15 km)

State Route 55 Business (SR 55 Bus.) is a business spur of SR 55 into McMinnville. The route begins at an interchange with SR 55 southwest of McMinnville, heading east on two-lane undivided South Chancery Street. The road immediately intersects the southern terminus of SR 286 and heads through wooded areas with some homes and businesses. SR 55 Bus. curves northeast and passes near commercial development before intersecting the northern terminus of SR 108. The road continues through woodland with some residences and businesses, crossing the Barren Fork. The route turns north and passes through industrial areas before it heads into downtown McMinnville and comes to an intersection with SR 56. At this point, SR 56 turns north for a concurrency with SR 55 Bus. and the road intersects SR 380, which is routed on the one-way pair of Main Street eastbound and Morford Street westbound. Here, SR 55 Bus. ends and SR 56 continues north along North Chancery Street.

Junction list
The entire route is in McMinnville, Warren County.

mi	km	Destinations	Notes
0.0	0.0	SR 55 (McMinnville Bypass / Manchester Highway) – Morrison, Manchester, Sparta	Interchange with SR 55; Western terminus of SR 55 Business
0.1	0.16	SR 286 north (Morrison Street) – Downtown McMinnville	Southern terminus of SR 286
1.6	2.6	SR 108 south (Viola Road) – Viola, Hillsboro, Altamont	South end of SR 108 overlap
		Frank G. Clement Memorial Bridge over the Barren Fork River	
3.2	5.1	SR 56 south (East Colville Street) – Beersheba Springs, Altamont	Southern end of SR 56 concurrency
		SR 56 north (Chancery Street); SR 380 (Main and Morford Streets)	Eastern terminus of SR 55 Business and Northern terminus of SR 108
1.000 mi = 1.609 km; 1.000 km = 0.621 mi: Concurrency terminus

== See also ==
- List of state routes in Tennessee
