= Senator Faulkner (disambiguation) =

Charles James Faulkner (1847–1929) was a U.S. Senator from West Virginia from 1887 to 1899. Senator Faulkner may also refer to:

- Asa Faulkner (1802–1886), Tennessee State Senate
- Charles J. Faulkner (1806–1884), Virginia State Senate
- James H. Faulkner (1916–2008), Alabama State Senate
- James Faulkner (Livingston County, New York) (1790–1884), New York State Senate
