= WAKI (AM) =

- McMinnville, Tennessee; United States
- Broadcast area: McMinnville, Tennessee; Warren County, Tennessee
- Frequency: 1230 kHz
- Branding: "1230 WAKI Sports Radio"

Programming
- Format: Sports
- Affiliations: ESPN Radio

Ownership
- Owner: Peg Broadcasting, Inc.

History
- First air date: 1947

Technical information
- Facility ID: 17758
- Class: C
- Power: 620 Watts daytime 1,000 Watts nighttime
- Transmitter coordinates: 35°40′0.0″N 85°46′35.0″W

Links
- Webcast: WAKI Webstream
- Website: WAKI Online

WAKI is a sports formatted broadcast radio station licensed to McMinnville, Tennessee, serving McMinnville and Warren County, Tennessee. WAKI is owned and operated by Peg Broadcasting, Inc.
