= Tennessee State Route 286 =

State highway in Tennessee, United States

State Route 286
- SR 186 highlighted in red

Route information
- Maintained by TDOT
- Length: 2.8 mi (4.5 km)
- Existed: July 1, 1983–present

Major junctions
- North end: SR 380 in McMinnville
- South end: SR 55 Bus. in McMinnville

Location
- Country: United States
- State: Tennessee
- Counties: Warren

Highway system
- Tennessee State Routes; Interstate; US; State
← SR 285	→ SR 287

State Route 286 (SR 286) is a short north–south highway in McMinnville, Tennessee. The current length is 2.8 mi (4.5 km).

== Route description ==
SR 286 begins at an intersection with SR 55 Bus. (S Chancery Street) in southwest McMinnville. It moves northeast as Morrison Street, crossing bridges over Hickory Creek and the Barren Fork River. After the second crossing, the highway ends at SR 380 (Lind Street/W Main Street).

== Major intersections ==
The entire route is in McMinnville, Warren County.

mi	km	Destinations	Notes
0.0	0.0	SR 55 Bus. (S Chancery Street)	Southern terminus
2.8	4.5	SR 380 east (Lind Street/W Main Street)	One-way pair; northern terminus; no access from SR 286 northbound to SR 380 westbound
1.000 mi = 1.609 km; 1.000 km = 0.621 mi: Incomplete access

== See also ==
- List of state routes in Tennessee
