= Summitville, Tennessee =

- Unincorporated community
- Location within Tennessee Location within the United States
- Coordinates: 35°33′34″N 85°59′33″W
- Country: United States
- State: Tennessee
- County: Coffee
- Elevation: 1,122 ft (342 m)
- Time zone: UTC-6 (Central (CST))
  - Summer (DST): UTC-5 (CDT)
- ZIP code: 37382
- Area code: 931
- GNIS feature ID: 1271851

Summitville is an unincorporated community in Coffee County, Tennessee, United States. Summitville is located along the Caney Fork and Western Railroad near Tennessee State Route 55, 7.6 miles (12.2 km) northeast of Manchester. Summitville has a post office with ZIP code 37382, which opened on June 5, 1877. The Crouch-Ramsey Family Farm, which is listed on the National Register of Historic Places, is located near Summitville.

== Notable residents ==
- Bennett H. Henderson, U.S. Representative for Tennessee
