= Northcutt Plantation =

Historic house in Tennessee, United States

- U.S. National Register of Historic Places
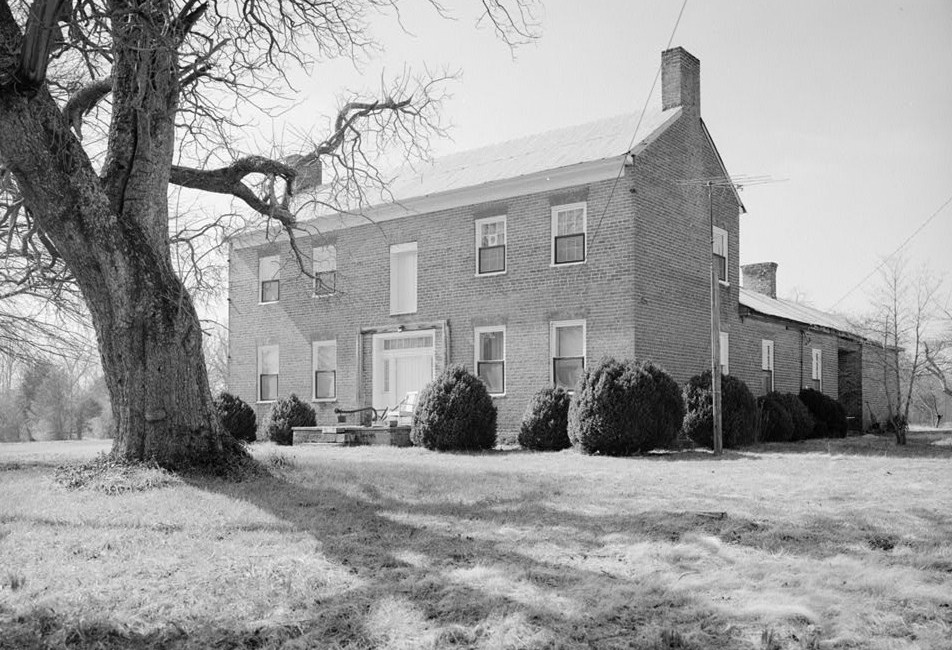

- Location within Tennessee Location within the United States
- Nearest city: McMinnville, Tennessee, U.S.
- Coordinates: 35°36′19″N 85°51′4″W
- Area: 5 acres (2.0 ha)
- Built: c. 1840
- NRHP reference No.: 75001795
- Added to NRHP: May 12, 1975

The Northcutt Plantation is a Southern plantation with a historic house and slave quarters located near McMinnville, Tennessee, USA. The two-story house was built circa 1840. It has been listed on the National Register of Historic Places since May 12, 1975.
