= McMinnville Civic Center =

Multi-purpose arena in McMinnville, Tennessee

Coordinates: 35.69062°N 85.78678°W

Opened in 1975, McMinnville Civic Center is a 4,800-seat multi-purpose arena in McMinnville, Tennessee. It hosts various local concerts and sporting events for the area.
