= Lester Strode =

American baseball coach (born 1958)

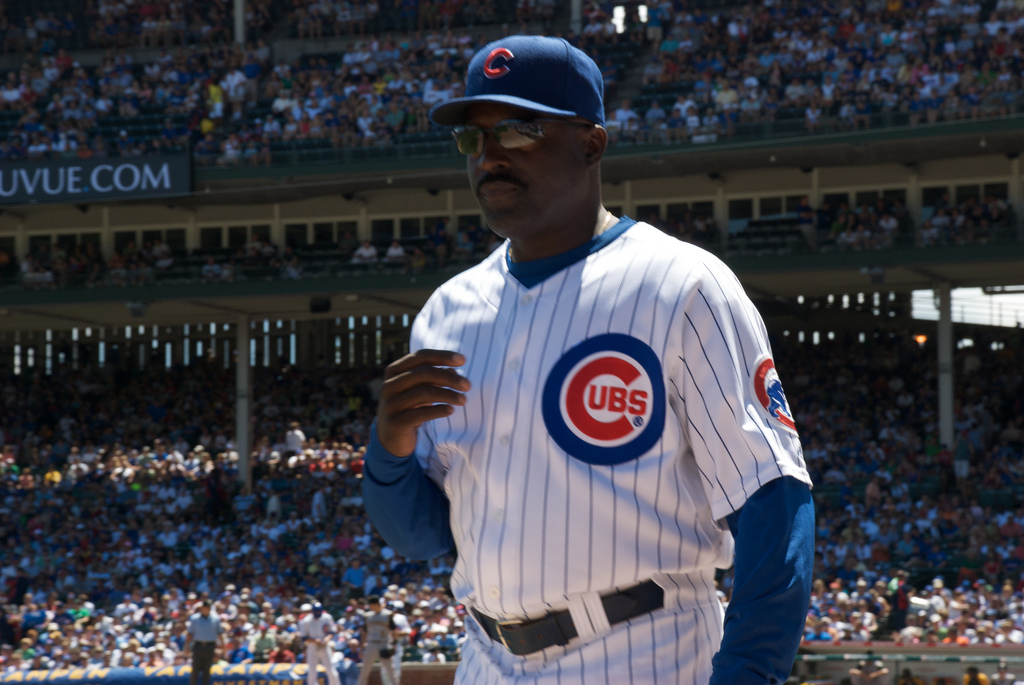
- Strode with the Chicago Cubs in 2008
- Bullpen coach
- Born: June 17, 1958 (age 68); McMinnville, Tennessee, U.S.
- Bats: Left Throws: Left
- Stats at Baseball Reference

Teams
- Chicago Cubs (2007–2019)

Career highlights and awards
- World Series champion (2016)

James Lester Strode (born June 17, 1958) is an American professional baseball coach. He was the bullpen coach for the Chicago Cubs from 2007 through 2019.

== Career ==
He was born and raised in McMinnville, Tennessee, often crediting McMinnville as his home. After attending Kentucky State University, Strode was selected as a pitcher by the Kansas City Royals in the 4th round of the 1980 amateur draft and played in the minors from 1980 to 1988.

After his playing career ended, he was a longtime pitching coach in the Chicago Cubs farm system. Strode was the pitching coach for the Rookie League Wytheville Cubs in 1989, the Single-A Peoria Chiefs from 1990 to 1991, the Winston-Salem Spirits in 1992, and the Daytona Cubs in 1993. He was then the Cubs' minor league pitching coordinator from 1996 to 2006. Following the 2006 season, he became the Cubs' bullpen coach. Strode served as the Cubs bullpen coach from 2007 through 2019, under managers Lou Piniella, Mike Quade, Dale Sveum, Rick Rentería, and Joe Maddon. He was a member of the 2016 coaching staff for the Cubs that led the team winning the World Series.

In December 2006, Strode was chosen as a member of the Warren County (TN) Sports Hall of Fame.

He was inducted to the Kentucky State Thorobreds sports Hall of Fame in 2017.
