= Spring Street Service Station =

Gas station in McMinnville, Tennessee

- U.S. National Register of Historic Places
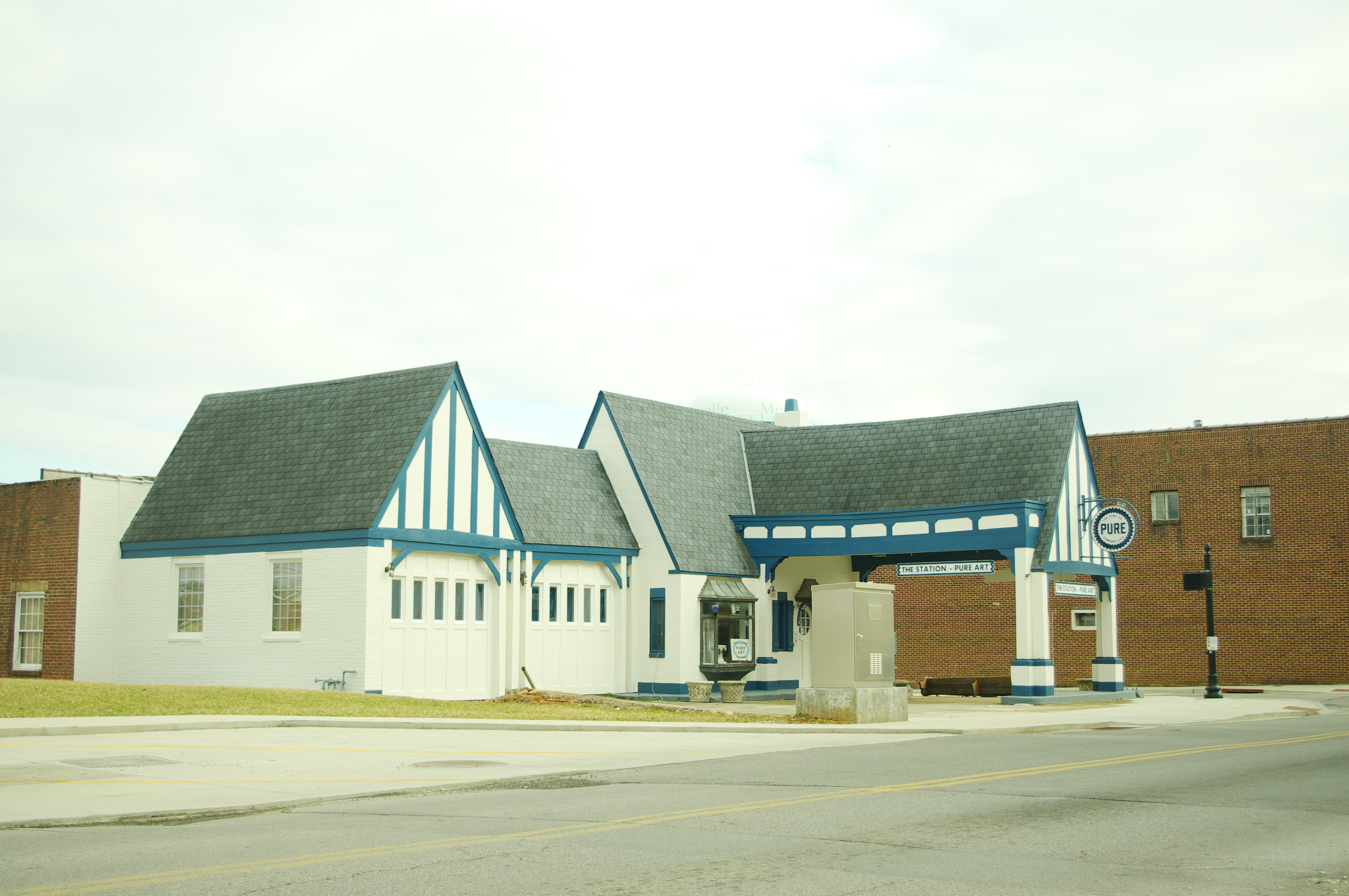

- Location within Tennessee
- Location: 200 N. Spring St., McMinnville, Tennessee
- Coordinates: 35°40′55″N 85°46′17″W
- Area: less than one acre
- Built: 1932
- Architect: Carl August Petersen
- Architectural style: Tudor Revival
- NRHP reference No.: 01001263
- Added to NRHP: November 21, 2001

The Spring Street Service Station, at 200 N. Spring St. in McMinnville, Tennessee, also known as Pure Oil Gas Station, was built in 1932. It was designed by Carl August Petersen with Tudor Revival style, inside and out. It was listed on the National Register of Historic Places in 2001.

Specifically it "follows the English Cottage design established by Carl August Petersen of the Pure Oil Company. The station is an excellent example of the company's English Cottage design that was widely constructed throughout the country during the 1920s to the early 1950s. Resting on a concrete slab foundation, the one story white brick building is highlighted by a series of steeply pitch side gable roofs covered with blue tinted asphalt shingles. The service station follows a simple rectangular plan that is divided into three distinct sections consisting of the office, the service garage, and lastly the service pump island that is shielded by a projecting canopy. The north and east elevations are concealed from view by an apartment building and a warehouse respectively. Rehabilitated as a result of a tax credit project, the Spring Street Service Station maintains a high degree of integrity. The building retains its original interior plan and its character defining elements. In some cases, a few exterior ornamentations had to be replaced due to deterioration; however, these have been replaced with in-kind materials that match the original pattern and design as close as possible."

At a later date it became an art gallery.
