= Tennessee State Route 380 =

State highway in Tennessee, United States

State Route 380
- TN 380 highlighted in red

Route information
- Maintained by TDOT
- Length: 4.2 mi (6.8 km)
- Existed: July 1, 1983–present

Major junctions
- West end: US 70S / SR 55 in McMinnville
- SR 56 in McMinnville
- East end: US 70S in McMinnville

Location
- Country: United States
- State: Tennessee
- Counties: Warren

Highway system
- Tennessee State Routes; Interstate; US; State
← SR 379	→ SR 381

State Route 380 (SR 380) is a short east–west highway in McMinnville, Tennessee. The current length is 4.2 mi (6.8 km).

== Route description ==
SR 380 begins at an intersection with SR 55, US 70S, and SR 1 in northwestern McMinnville. US 70S/SR 1 goes east from Woodbury and turns northeast at this intersection. SR 55 begins at the south fork of the intersection and SR 380 begins at the east fork.

SR 380 goes southeast into downtown McMinnville as West Main Street and becomes two separate one-way streets in downtown. Eastbound SR 380 retains the name West Main Street (which becomes East Main Street after an intersection with SR 56) and westbound SR 380 is called West Morford Street (which becomes East Morford Street after an intersection with SR 56). This goes for approximately 0.5 miles (0.80 km) until both streets come back together to form Sparta Street just east of downtown. SR 380 (Sparta Street) continues northeast before terminating at US 70S/SR 1.

== History ==
SR 380 is the former routing of US 70S/SR 1 through downtown McMinnville prior to the 4-lane bypass being built to the north and east between 1994 and 2002.

== Junction list ==
The entire route is in McMinnville, Warren County.

mi	km	Destinations	Notes
0.0	0.0	US 70S (Nashville Highway/Bobby Ray Memorial Highway/SR 1) – Sparta, Woodbury SR 55 west (McMinnville Bypass) – Manchester	Interchange; eastern terminus of SR 55; western terminus of SR 380
1.6	2.6	SR 380 splits into two one-way streets; Eastbound continues as East Main Street.	
1.7	2.7	SR 286 south (Morrison Street) – Morrison	No access from SR 286 northbound to SR 380 westbound
1.9	3.1	SR 56 (Chancery Street North/South) / SR 55 Bus. west (South Chancery Street) to SR 108 – Manchester, Smithville	Eastern terminus of SR 55 Business
2.1	3.4	East Main Street To SR 56 – Beersheba Springs	
2.2	3.5	East Main Street and East Morford Street come together to form Sparta Street; End of one-way streets.	
4.1	6.6	US 70S (Bobby Ray Memorial Parkway/Sparta Street/SR 1) – Manchester, Sparta, Woodbury	Eastern terminus
1.000 mi = 1.609 km; 1.000 km = 0.621 mi: Incomplete access

== See also ==
- List of state routes in Tennessee
