= Drew Green =

American country music singer

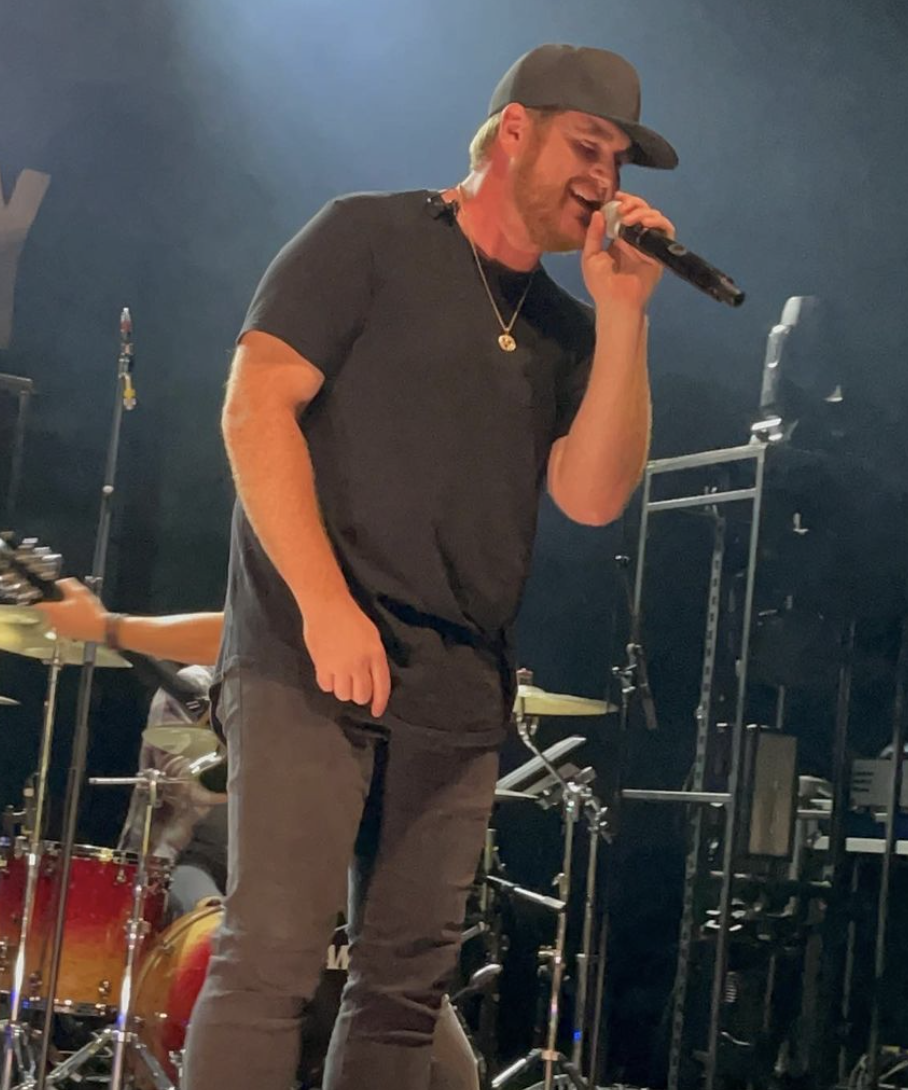
- Born: McMinnville, Tennessee, U.S.
- Occupation: Singer
- Years active: 2018–present
- Website: drewgreen.com

Drew Green is an American country music singer-songwriter signed to Sony Music Nashville. Before becoming a performer, Green wrote songs for other artists including Florida Georgia Line and Conner Smith. In 2020, he released his debut project, Dirt Boy Vol. 1. The lead single, "Little More Be Alright," began playing on SiriusXM's The Highway channel.

== Early life and songwriting career ==
Green was born and raised in McMinnville, Tennessee, where he worked on his father's nursery. He grew up listening to hip-hop and country music, citing Eric Church, Alan Jackson, and Sammy Kershaw as some of his early influences.

While in college, Green started playing shows locally while pursuing a degree in finance. The owner of Tootsie's Orchid Lounge saw one of Green's performances, and afterward invited him to play at the Nashville bar. The set turned into a regular weekend gig for Green.

After graduating, Green began working at a local bank, but soon after quit the job and relocated to Nashville in order to pursue a songwriting career. He began co-writing with local musicians including Hardy.

In 2018, Florida Georgia Line cut "Colorado", which Green wrote with Hardy and Hunter Phelps. The song was included on the band's fourth studio album Can't Say I Ain't Country. Green co-wrote Conner Smith's viral song, "I Hate Alabama".

In November 2018, Green signed a publishing deal with Cornman Music, a joint-venture between Warner/Chappell and musician Brett James, who signed on as Green's manager.

== Record deal and debut EP ==
In June 2020, Green signed a record deal with Sony Music Nashville and released his debut single "Little More Be Alright". In September, he released his introductory EP, Dirt Boy Vol. 1. Pandora named him an "Artist to Watch in 2021".

In August 2021, Green was announced as the main opener on Mitchell Tenpenny's headlining tour. Two months later, he released his sophomore project, Dirt Boy Vol. 2. In June, Green signed an exclusive deal with WME.

== Discography ==
Singles

- "Just Talkin" (Independent, 2018)
- "Little More Be Alright" (Sony Music Nashville, 2020)
- "Right Where I Be" (Sony Music Nashville, 2020)
- "Hooch" (Sony Music Nashville, 2021)
- "The Rest of Our Lives" (Sony Music Nashville, 2021)
- "Cold Beer and Copenhagen" (Sony Music Nashville, 2021)

EPs

- Dirt Boy Vol. 1 (Sony Music Nashville, 2020)
- Dirt Boy Vol. 2 (Sony Music Nashville, 2021)
