= Utopia Hotel =

- U.S. National Register of Historic Places
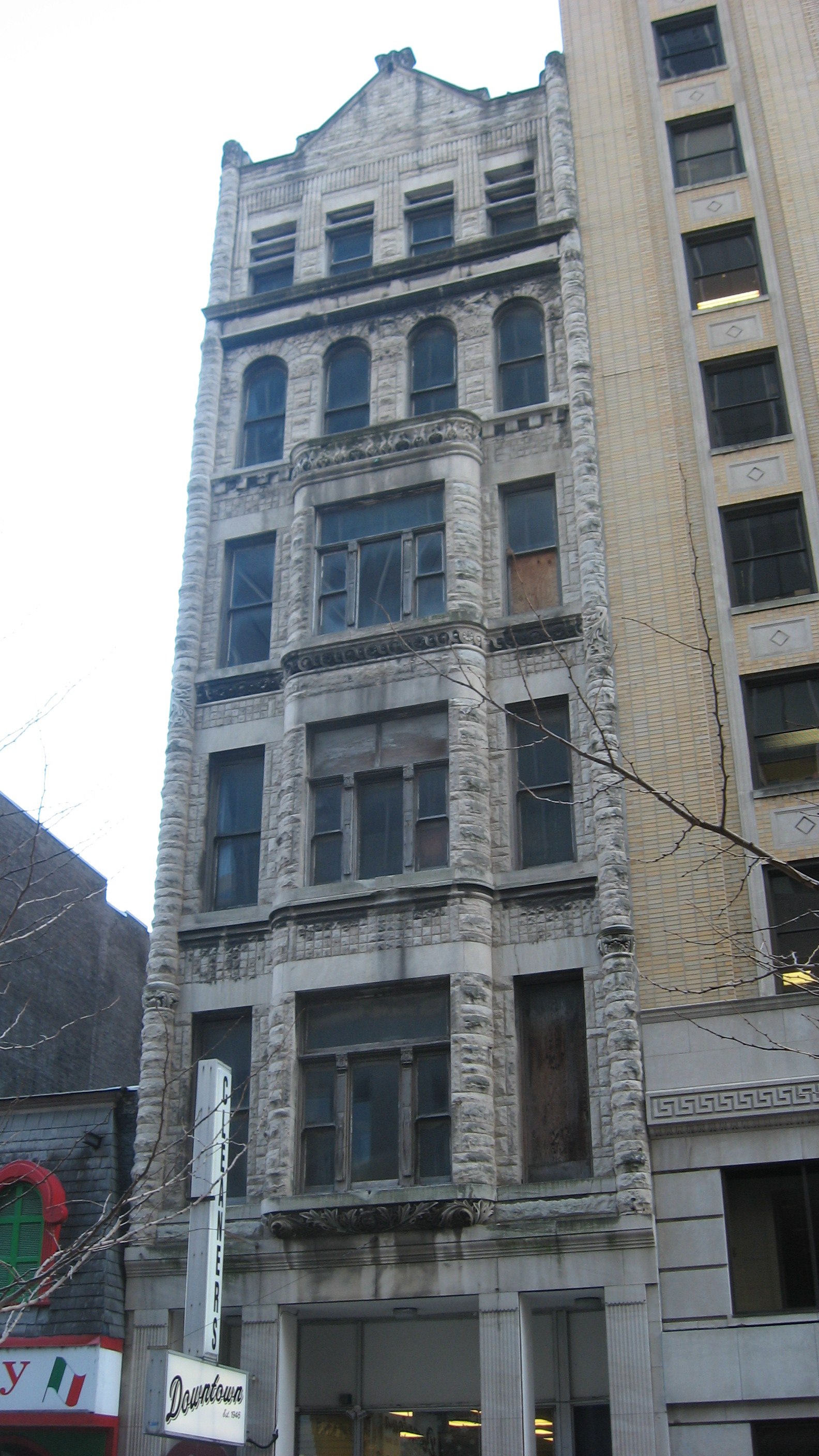
- The former Utopia Hotel, January 2014

- Location within Tennessee Location within the United States
- Location: 206 4th Avenue North, Nashville, Tennessee, USA
- Coordinates: 36°9′51″N 86°46′43″W
- Area: less than one acre
- Built: 1891
- Architect: Hugh Cathcart Thompson
- Architectural style: Romanesque
- NRHP reference No.: 79002428
- Added to NRHP: March 26, 1979

The Utopia Hotel is a historic building in Nashville, Tennessee.

== Location ==
The building is located at 206 4th Avenue North in Nashville, Tennessee. The street was called the "Men's Quarter," where no respectable woman would venture.

== History ==
The hotel was built in 1891 to the design of architect Hugh Cathcart Thompson. It was built to accommodate the visitors of the Tennessee Centennial Exposition. It has six storeys.

In 1904, it became home to a restaurant, where many men would have lunch on their workdays. It was dedicated with a dinner for the Nashville Press Club. Later, it became home to a laundromat called Downtown Cleaners and a strip club called Brass Stables.

In 2014, it was scheduled to be turned into a luxury hotel alongside other buildings around it, with developer Bill Barkley and investors Alex Marks and Billy Frist at the helm.

It has been listed on the National Register of Historic Places listings since March 26, 1979.
