= Sophia Foster Richardson =

American mathematician

Sophia Foster Richardson (1855–1916) was an American mathematician affiliated with Vassar College. Her 1897 essay, "Tendencies in athletics for women in colleges and universities", continues to be used as source material for the history of women's college athletics. She was also the author of a 1914 textbook on solid geometry.

== Life and work ==
Richardson was born on October 9, 1855, in McMinnville, Tennessee. She was educated at Vassar College, where she graduated in 1879. She became a teacher at The Rutherford Institute, a private school in New Jersey, in 1879, and was its principal from 1882 to 1885.

In 1885, she returned to Vassar as an instructor of mathematics. During this period she spent several summers studying advanced mathematics, including two summers at the University of Chicago, another at Newnham College, Cambridge, and the summer of 1914 in Munich. Although she did not earn an advanced degree, she was promoted to assistant professor in 1914 on the basis of the publication of her textbook.

After this work, she began research on a generalization of Pascal's theorem. Pascal's theorem concerns six points on a conic curve, and her work considered a three-dimensional generalization involving seven points on a twisted cubic; however, she never completed this. She proposed to retire in 1916, but died on February 2, 1916, before her retirement could take effect.

== Selected publications ==
- Richardson, Sophia Foster (February 1897), "Tendencies in athletics for women in colleges and universities", Popular Science Monthly, vol. 50
- Richardson, S. F. (1907), "Note on systems of in- and circumscribed polygons", Bulletin of the American Mathematical Society, 13: 177–182
- Richardson, Sophia Foster (1914), Solid Geometry, Ginn and Company
