= First Presbyterian Church (McMinnville, Tennessee) =

Historic church in Tennessee, United States

- U.S. National Register of Historic Places
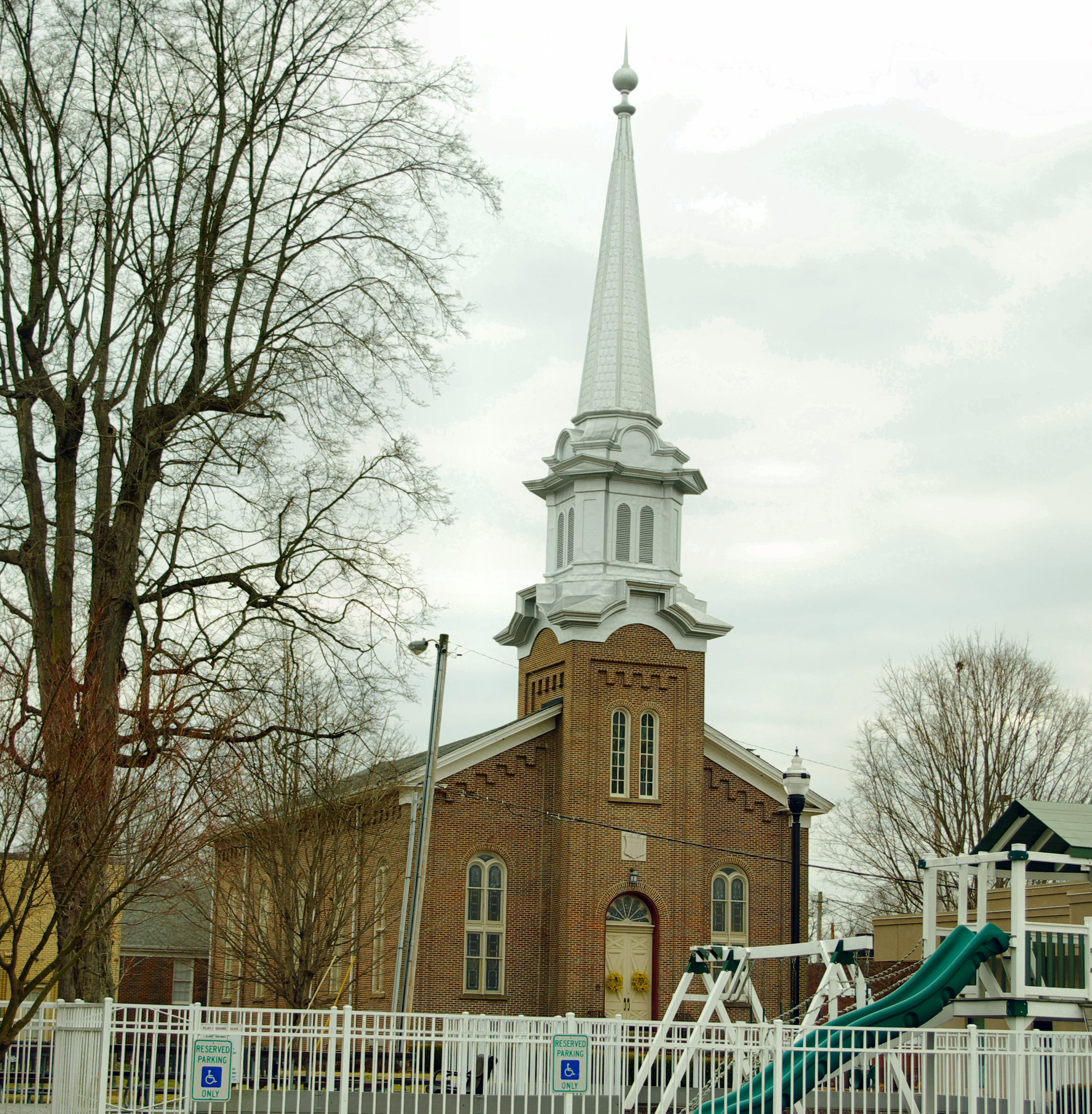

- Location within Tennessee Location within the United States
- Location: 205 W. Main St., McMinnville, Tennessee
- Coordinates: 35°40′52″N 85°46′31″W
- Area: less than one acre
- Built: 1872
- Architect: Dobson and Williamson
- Architectural style: Gothic Revival
- NRHP reference No.: 95001061
- Added to NRHP: September 13, 1995

The First Presbyterian Church in McMinnville, Tennessee, also known as Cumberland Presbyterian Church, is a historic Presbyterian church at 205 W. Main Street. It was added to the National Register of Historic Places in 1995.

The congregation was founded around 1839 and its first building, a simple one-story brick building, was built around 1840. That building was destroyed in a fire in 1865. This new church was built on a new site in 1872.

It is a one-story brick church upon a raised basement and limestone foundation. An alcove was added in 1906 and the church was extended to the rear in 1966 with a two-story brick addition.
