= George Tucker Stainback =

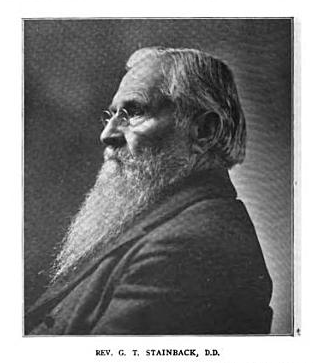
Reverend G. T. Stainback, D.D.

George Tucker Stainback (April 4, 1829 in Brunswick County, Virginia – June 28, 1902 at Dyersburg, Tennessee) was an American classicist and Presbyterian minister; he served as a chaplain in the Confederate Army, and in 1877 presided over the funeral of Confederate general Nathan Bedford Forrest.

== Early life and education ==
Stainback was the son of George W. and Lucretia T. (née Eppes) Stainback who had married in 1818 and moved to Limestone County, Alabama, and then, in 1835, to Memphis, Tennessee. Stainback attended the University of Mississippi in Oxford, earning his A.B. (1854) and A.M (1856), D.D. (1855) degrees. In 1855-6 he was assistant professor of Latin and Greek.

== Ministry ==
During the American Civil War Stainback served as a chaplain in the Confederate army.

He maintained his ministry in Columbus, Mississippi, for 13 years before moving to Huntsville, Alabama, in 1872. From 1874-1878 he was First Cumberland Presbyterian Church of Memphis, but then returned to Columbus, Mississippi, in 1879. He was noted for having a profound impact on former Confederate general Nathan Bedford Forrest shortly after the latter's conversion in 1875; Stainback later visited Forrest as he lay dying, and presided over Forrest's funeral services in 1877. During the general's eulogy, Stainback declared: "Lieutenant-General Nathan Bedford Forrest, though dead, yet speaketh. His acts have photographed themselves upon the hearts of thousands, and will speak there forever."

=== Masonry ===
Stainback also served as a Grand Master of the Grand Lodge of Masons in Mississippi, and Grand Chaplain of the Grand Lodge in Tennessee.

== Personal life ==
Stainback married Clara B. Grady on October 19, 1854. Following Grady's death on December 5, 1864, he wedded Mary Gibson of Columbus, Mississippi, on January 4, 1871. He had seven children.

Stainback died in 1902 in Dyersberg, Tennessee, and was buried in Columbus, Mississippi.
