= First Methodist Church (McMinnville, Tennessee) =

Historic church in Tennessee, United States

- U.S. National Register of Historic Places
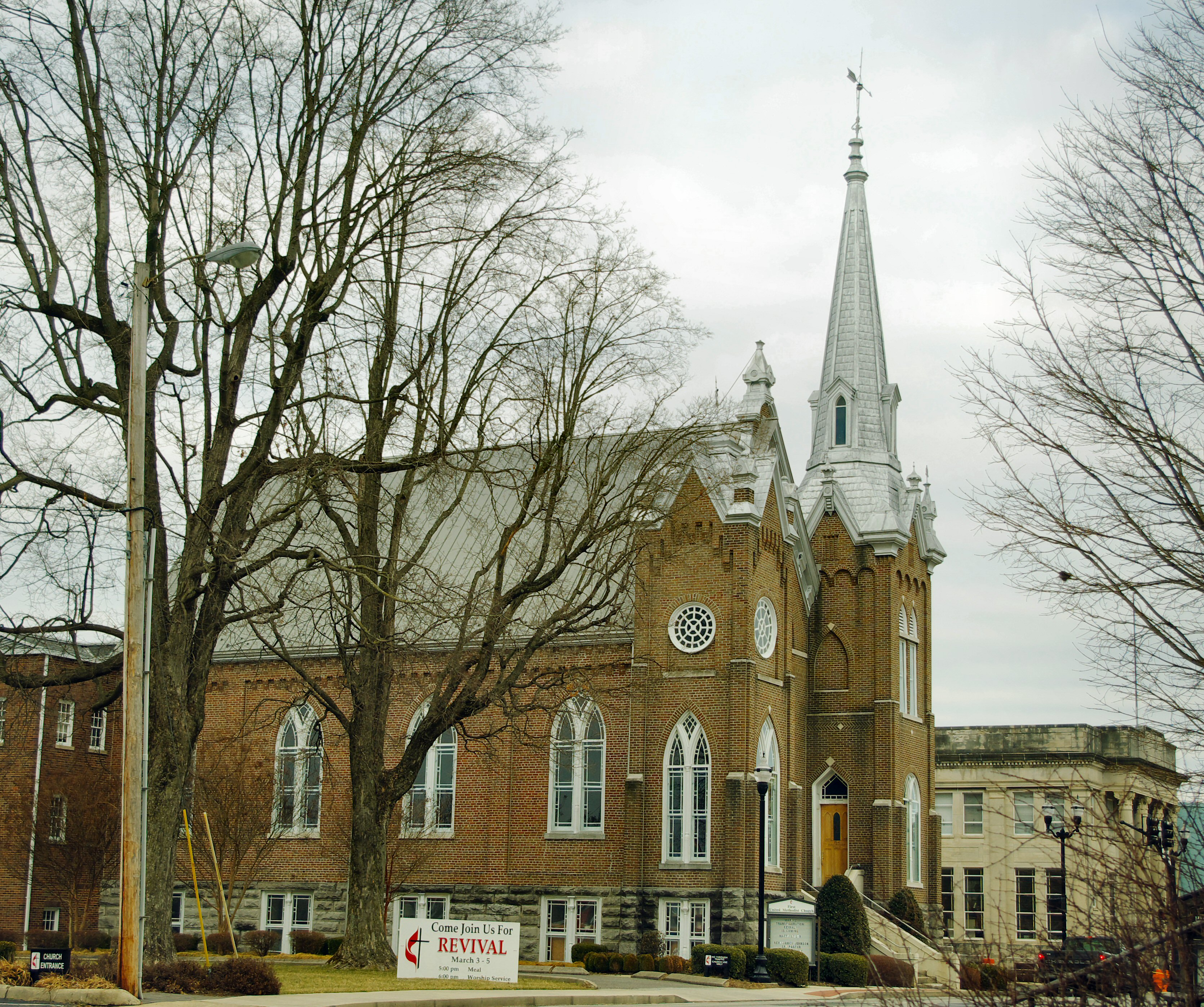

- Location within Tennessee Location within the United States
- Location: 200 W. Main St., McMinnville, Tennessee
- Coordinates: 35°40′54″N 85°46′29″W
- Built: 1886-1889
- Architect: Hugh Cathcart Thompson
- Architectural style: High Victorian Gothic
- NRHP reference No.: 02001341
- Added to NRHP: November 15, 2002

First Methodist Church, also known as First United Methodist Church, is a church in McMinnville, Tennessee. It was listed on the National Register of Historic Places in 2002.

Its cornerstone was laid in 1886 and it was completed in 1889. It is important as a High Victorian Gothic church designed by architect Hugh Cathcart Thompson.
