= Falconhurst =

Historic house in Tennessee, United States

- U.S. National Register of Historic Places
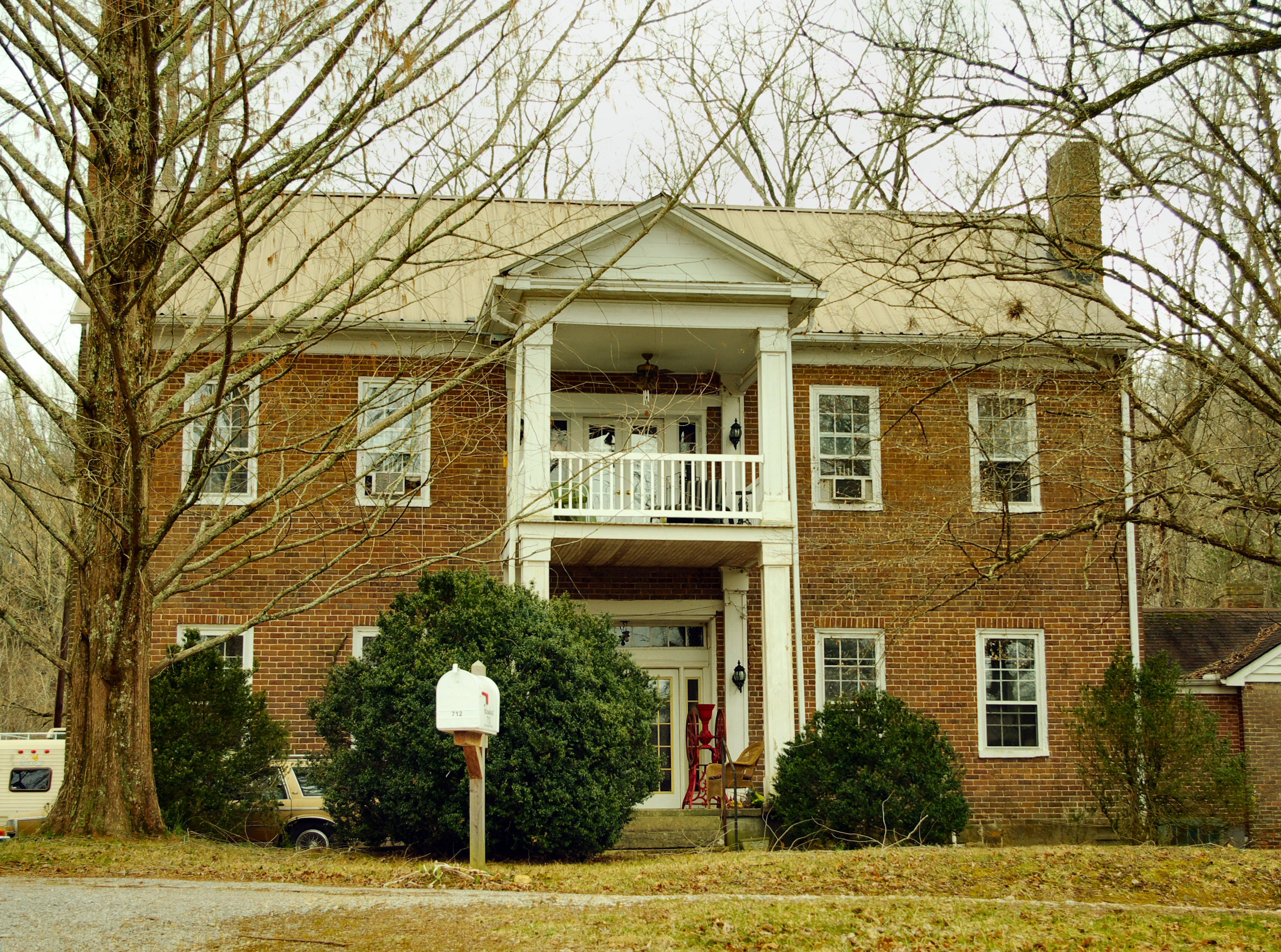
- Falconhurst in 2014

- Location within Tennessee Location within the United States
- Nearest city: McMinnville, Tennessee
- Coordinates: 35°42′57″N 85°46′3″W
- Area: less than one acre
- Built: 1850
- Built by: Asa Faulkner
- Architectural style: Greek Revival, Federal
- NRHP reference No.: 82004062
- Added to NRHP: August 26, 1982

Falconhurst is a historic mansion in Warren County, Tennessee, U.S. near McMinnville. It was built in 1850 for Asa Faulkner, the owner of textile mills, and a politician who served as a member of the Tennessee House of Representatives and the Tennessee Senate. It was later the private residence of Charles Faulkner Bryan, a composer of folk music who married into the Faulkner family.

The house was designed in the Federal and Greek Revival architectural styles. It has been listed on the National Register of Historic Places since August 26, 1982.
