= Asa Faulkner =

American businessman and politician

Member of the Tennessee Senate
- In office 1869–1871

Member of the Tennessee House of Representatives
- In office 1865–1866

Personal details
- Born: July 16, 1802 Edgefield, South Carolina, U.S.
- Died: July 29, 1886 (aged 84) McMinnville, Tennessee, U.S.
- Party: Whig
- Spouse(s): Annis Wolfe; Sally Reynolds; Martha Ann Martin
- Children: 19
- Occupation: Owner of textile mills

Asa Faulkner (July 16, 1802 – July 29, 1886) was an American businessman and politician. He served in the Tennessee House of Representatives and the Tennessee Senate.

== Early life ==
Asa Faulkner was born on July 16, 1802, in Edgefield County, South Carolina. His father was Dr. Archibald Faulkner and his mother, Rebecca Burkhalter. His father was of English descent, a fourth-generation Marylander. His mother was of German Quaker descent. His parents settled in Warren County, Tennessee when he was 6.

== Career ==
Faulkner began his career by working for a woollen mill from 1812 to 1830, when he built his own. He also acquired a cotton gin and built a dam, and became wealthy by the 1840s. His house and mill were still standing as landmarks on Charles Creek near McMinnville as of 1931. Faulkner sold "Faulkner Jeans." He was "the nestor of all of Warren County's manufacturing interests, and spent all his long life in founding, nourishing and sustaining them."

Faulkner joined the Whig Party. During the American Civil War, he supported the Union Army. He served as a member of the Tennessee House of Representatives from 1865 to 1866, and as a member of the Tennessee Senate from 1869 to 1871.

== Death ==
Faulkner first married Annis Wolfe; he later remarried twice, to Sally Reynolds, and Martha Ann Martin. He had 19 children, and resided at Falconhurst in McMinnville.

Faulkner died on July 29, 1886, in McMinnville, Tennessee. His funeral was conducted by Presbyterian minister George Tucker Stainback.
