= Southern Standard =

- Type: Semi-daily newspaper
- Format: Broadsheet
- Owner: Paxton Media Group
- Founded: 1879
- Language: English
- Headquarters: 477 N Chancery St Suite 4, McMinnville, Tennessee United States
- Website: southernstandard.com

Southern Standard is a semi-daily newspaper based in McMinnville, Tennessee. It has a sports and business section. The newspaper was founded in 1879. In March 2025, Paxton Media Group purchased the Southern Standard and Smithville Review from Morris Multimedia.
