= Caney Fork and Western Railroad =

Shortline railroad in Tennessee, US

Overview
- Headquarters: McMinnville, Tennessee
- Reporting mark: CFWR
- Locale: Central Tennessee
- Dates of operation: 1983–present
- Predecessor: Seaboard System

Technical
- Track gauge: 4 ft 8 1/2 in (1,435 mm) (standard gauge)
- Length: 61 miles (98 km)

The Caney Fork and Western Railroad (reporting mark CFWR) is a shortline railroad operating since 1983 from a connection with CSX Transportation at Tullahoma to McMinnville, Tennessee, and ends in Sparta, Tennessee 61 miles (98 km). Currently the railroad is a subsidiary of Ironhorse Resources. The railroad was originally built by the Nashville, Chattanooga, and St. Louis Railroad. Source: Stone plaque inset into the south pier of the Warren truss bridge over the Caney Fork River at Rock Island, Tennessee, USA.

Principal commodities include lumber, steel, fertilizer, grain, propane, carbon black, and tires generating approximately 1,350 annual carloads.
