= Barren Fork (Collins River tributary) =

River in Tennessee, United States of America

Coordinates: 35.69424°N 85.72720°W

Location
- Country: United States
- Location: Tennessee

Physical characteristics
- Source
  - location: Warren County, Tennessee
  - elevation: 830 ft (253 m)
- Mouth
  - location: McMinnville, TN
- Length: 23.4 mi (37.7 km)
- Discharge
  - location: Trousdale
  - average: 218 cu ft/s (6.2 m^{3}/s)

The Barren Fork is a 23.4-mile-long (37.7 km) tributary of the Collins River in the U.S. state of Tennessee. Via the Collins River, the Caney Fork, and the Cumberland and Ohio rivers, it is part of the Mississippi River watershed.

The Barren Fork rises in western Warren County, Tennessee. It is formed from the confluence of its north and south prongs, which join near the tiny community of Trousdale. Its component streams and their tributaries drain much of the eastern portions of Cannon County and Coffee County. The stream flows generally from west to east until it reaches the town of McMinnville, county seat of Warren County. From there it turns in a more northeasterly direction. From this point it is less than 5 linear miles (8 km) to the mouth of the Barren Fork into the Collins River, but considerably longer by the meandering course taken by the stream in its lower reaches. Near downtown McMinnville is a dam formerly utilized by the city as an electric power source; it was supplanted by the Tennessee Valley Authority system, as the small amount (by modern standards) of electricity it was capable of producing makes it impracticable to man and maintain by modern standards.

The Barren Fork is named for the "Barrens" area of Middle Tennessee. This area comprises much of Coffee County, western Warren County, and southeastern Cannon County. The area was first named this by the early settlers, who were surprised to find a largely unforested area in the midst of what was generally a dense hardwood forest surrounding it. Several theories have been suggested as to its origin. The area is somewhat swampy, however; it is too moist for many types of hardwood trees that cannot survive long periods of "wet feet". It is suggested that it was cleared by Native Americans, in part using fire, so that the resulting open area would improve grazing conditions for elk, deer, and buffalo and thus improve hunting, and that they, like their white successors, also used the area for agriculture. Since only a limited number of native hardwood trees could grow in the area, it was relatively easy for the area to remain cleared once it had initially had much of its woody vegetation removed.

The Tennessee Wildlife Resources Agency (TWRA) maintains three boat access sites in McMinnville.

== See also ==
- List of rivers of Tennessee
