= McMinnville, Tennessee =

- City
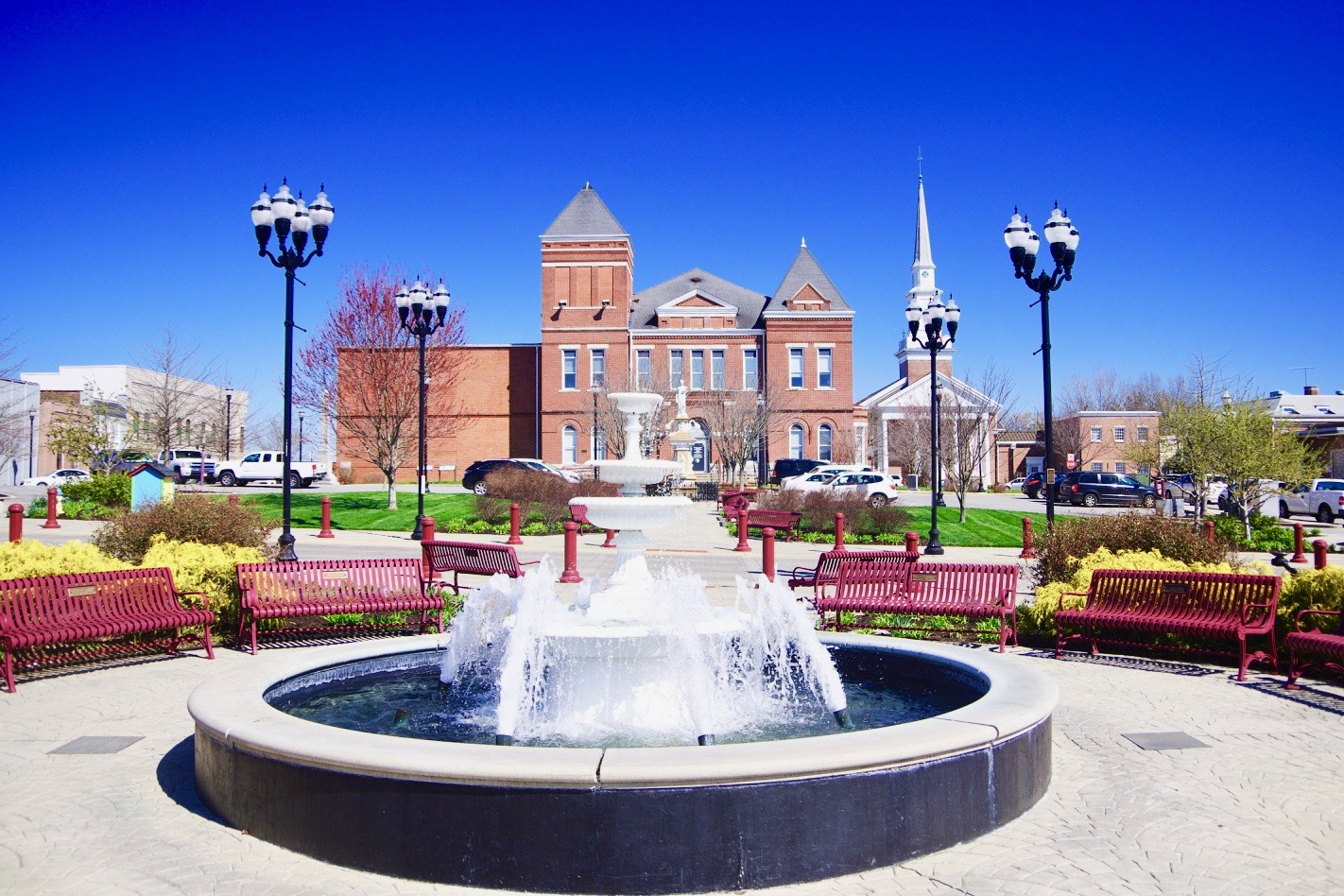
- Courthouse Square

- Flag Seal

- Location of McMinnville in Warren County, Tennessee.
- Coordinates: 35°41′12″N 85°46′46″W
- Country: United States
- State: Tennessee
- County: Warren
- Founded: August 4, 1810
- Incorporated: 1868
- Named for: Joseph McMinn

Government
  - Type: Mayor and Board of Aldermen
  - Mayor: Ryle Chastain

Area
  - Total: 11.06 sq mi (28.65 km^{2})
  - Land: 11.06 sq mi (28.65 km^{2})
  - Water: 0 sq mi (0.00 km^{2})
- Elevation: 961 ft (293 m)

Population (2020)
  - Total: 13,788
  - Density: 1,246.5/sq mi (481.28/km^{2})
- Time zone: UTC-6 (CST)
  - Summer (DST): UTC-5 (CDT)
- ZIP code: 37110, 37111
- Area code: 931
- FIPS code: 47-45100
- GNIS feature ID: 1652432
- Website: McMinnvilleTn.gov

McMinnville is the largest city in and the county seat of Warren County, Tennessee, United States. The population was 13,788 at the 2020 census. It was named after Governor Joseph McMinn.

== Geography ==
McMinnville is located at 35°41′12″N 85°46′46″W (35.686708, −85.779309), approximately 35 miles (56 km) south of Cookeville and 70 miles (110 km) northwest of Chattanooga.

According to the United States Census Bureau, the city has a total area of 10.0 square miles (26 km^{2}), all land. McMinnville lies at an elevation of 968 feet (295 m), as it sits along the Eastern Highland Rim near the base of the Cumberland Plateau. The city is drained primarily by the Barren Fork, a tributary of the Collins River.

=== Nearby cities and towns ===
- Morrison
- Viola
- Centertown
- Rock Island
- Beersheeba Springs
- Spencer
- Sparta
- Smithville
- Woodbury
- Manchester

=== Climate ===
Climate data for McMinnville, Tennessee (1991–2020 normals, extremes 1894–present)
Month	Jan	Feb	Mar	Apr	May	Jun	Jul	Aug	Sep	Oct	Nov	Dec	Year
Record high °F (°C)	79 (26)	80 (27)	89 (32)	95 (35)	100 (38)	106 (41)	106 (41)	106 (41)	106 (41)	96 (36)	86 (30)	77 (25)	106 (41)
Mean daily maximum °F (°C)	50.6 (10.3)	54.8 (12.7)	63.1 (17.3)	72.9 (22.7)	79.4 (26.3)	85.9 (29.9)	88.6 (31.4)	87.9 (31.1)	82.8 (28.2)	73.2 (22.9)	62.0 (16.7)	53.4 (11.9)	71.2 (21.8)
Daily mean °F (°C)	40.9 (4.9)	44.3 (6.8)	51.7 (10.9)	60.5 (15.8)	68.0 (20.0)	75.0 (23.9)	78.2 (25.7)	77.2 (25.1)	71.5 (21.9)	61.0 (16.1)	50.4 (10.2)	43.6 (6.4)	60.2 (15.7)
Mean daily minimum °F (°C)	31.2 (−0.4)	33.9 (1.1)	40.4 (4.7)	48.1 (8.9)	56.5 (13.6)	64.1 (17.8)	67.8 (19.9)	66.5 (19.2)	60.3 (15.7)	48.8 (9.3)	38.8 (3.8)	33.8 (1.0)	49.2 (9.6)
Record low °F (°C)	−19 (−28)	−26 (−32)	1 (−17)	20 (−7)	30 (−1)	38 (3)	47 (8)	43 (6)	32 (0)	22 (−6)	−1 (−18)	−10 (−23)	−26 (−32)
Average precipitation inches (mm)	4.57 (116)	5.00 (127)	5.24 (133)	5.04 (128)	4.69 (119)	4.53 (115)	4.80 (122)	3.70 (94)	3.90 (99)	3.21 (82)	4.24 (108)	5.49 (139)	54.41 (1,382)
Average snowfall inches (cm)	1.4 (3.6)	0.9 (2.3)	0.6 (1.5)	0.0 (0.0)	0.0 (0.0)	0.0 (0.0)	0.0 (0.0)	0.0 (0.0)	0.0 (0.0)	0.0 (0.0)	0.1 (0.25)	1.1 (2.8)	4.1 (10)
Average precipitation days (≥ 0.01 in)	12.2	12.5	13.1	11.4	11.7	12.0	12.6	10.0	8.8	9.3	9.7	13.0	136.3
Average snowy days (≥ 0.1 in)	1.0	1.2	0.7	0.0	0.0	0.0	0.0	0.0	0.0	0.0	0.0	0.8	3.7
Source: NOAA

== Demographics ==
Historical population
Census	Pop.	Note	%±
1850	420		—
1870	1,172		—
1880	1,244		6.1%
1890	1,677		34.8%
1900	1,980		18.1%
1910	2,299		16.1%
1920	2,814		22.4%
1930	3,914		39.1%
1940	4,649		18.8%
1950	7,577		63.0%
1960	9,013		19.0%
1970	10,662		18.3%
1980	10,683		0.2%
1990	11,194		4.8%
2000	12,749		13.9%
2010	13,605		6.7%
2020	13,788		1.3%

=== 2020 census ===
As of the 2020 census, there was a population of 13,788, with 5,782 households and 3,131 families residing in the city.

The median age was 38.6 years. 23.9% of residents were under the age of 18 and 18.1% of residents were 65 years of age or older. For every 100 females there were 87.1 males, and for every 100 females age 18 and over there were 83.7 males age 18 and over.

99.1% of residents lived in urban areas, while 0.9% lived in rural areas.

There were 5,782 households in McMinnville, of which 29.9% had children under the age of 18 living in them. Of all households, 33.3% were married-couple households, 20.3% were households with a male householder and no spouse or partner present, and 38.2% were households with a female householder and no spouse or partner present. About 35.9% of all households were made up of individuals and 15.8% had someone living alone who was 65 years of age or older.

There were 6,403 housing units, of which 9.7% were vacant. The homeowner vacancy rate was 2.6% and the rental vacancy rate was 9.2%.

Racial composition as of the 2020 census
Race	Number	Percent
White	10,900	79.1%
Black or African American	571	4.1%
American Indian and Alaska Native	47	0.3%
Asian	145	1.1%
Native Hawaiian and Other Pacific Islander	7	0.1%
Some other race	1,007	7.3%
Two or more races	1,111	8.1%
Hispanic or Latino (of any race)	1,837	13.3%

=== 2000 census ===
As of the census of 2000, there were 12,749 people, 5,419 households and 3,332 families residing in the city. The population density was 1,273.4 inhabitants per square mile (491.7/km^{2}). There were 5,961 housing units at an average density of 595.4 per square mile (229.9/km^{2}). The racial makeup of the city was 88.42% White, 4.15% African American, 0.16% Native American, 0.93% Asian, 0.05% Pacific Islander, 5.00% from other races, and 1.28% from two or more races. Hispanic or Latino of any race were 6.81% of the population.

There were 5,419 households, of which 28.6% had children under the age of 18 living with them, 42.6% were married couples living together, 14.8% had a female householder with no husband present, and 38.5% were non-families. 33.9% of all households were made up of individuals, and 15.4% had someone living alone who was 65 years of age or older. The average household size was 2.26 and the average family size was 2.86.

In the city, the population was spread out, with 23.5% under the age of 18, 10.1% from 18 to 24, 27.9% from 25 to 44, 20.6% from 45 to 64, and 18.0% who were 65 years of age or older. The median age was 36 years. For every 100 females, there were 87.3 males. For every 100 females age 18 and over, there were 84.0 males.

The median income for a household in the city was $23,810, and the median income for a family was $32,759. Males had a median income of $28,474 versus $20,693 for females. The per capita income for the city was $15,074. About 21.0% of families and 24.6% of the population were below the poverty line, including 34.5% of those under age 18 and 19.1% of those age 65 or over.

== Economy ==
The McMinnville area includes over 50 business and manufacturing plants and over 450 nurseries. The nursery business generates over $300 million in revenue and has given the area the title of "Nursery Capital of the World". The city's industrial needs are served by the Caney Fork and Western Railroad.

McMinnville, like many smaller American cities and towns, has gone through a revitalization of its downtown area. "Main Street McMinnville" serves as the city's non-profit revitalization organization funded by the National Trust for Historic Preservation and Tennessee's own Main Street Program.

== Media ==
McMinnville has two newspapers, the Southern Standard and the Main Street Journal. The city also has radio stations WBMC AM, Star 107, and WCPI FM. The city is also home to the studios of BLTV Channel 6, which is a local TV station on the BLTV cable system.

== Infrastructure ==
=== Transportation ===
Six different state routes pass in or around McMinnville. The city is also served by the Warren County Memorial Airport.

- U.S. 70S/State Route 1
- State Route 56
- State Route 55
- State Route 380
- State Route 286
- State Route 108

=== Utilities ===
Electricity for the city is handled by McMinnville Electric System and the Caney Fork Electric Cooperative. The Warren County Utility District handles water needs with support from the city, who also handles sewage. The Middle Tennessee Gas Utility District manages gas distribution, and landline telephone services are maintained by Ben Lomand Connect and Frontier Communications. Synchronous Gig broadband service for homes and businesses is offered by Ben Lomand Connect.

== Arts and culture ==
=== Annual cultural events ===
The Grand Reopening of the New Park Theater was May, 16th 2015. Located on West Main Street, this 2 million dollar facility was restored to its original beauty and is now the home of concerts, plays, and movies. Multiple shows go on every year. Dream Reality Group performs there, as does Warren Arts Community Theatre.

The city hosts a number of annual and frequent events. The non-profit downtown revitalization organization Main Street McMinnville hosts "Main Street LIVE!", a summer concert series that is held in June and July. In Autumn, the Chamber of Commerce hosts the Autumn Street Fair on one day in October. It features crafts, food, live music, and other activities in downtown McMinnville. Throughout spring, summer and winter the city hosts the Warren County Farmers Market.

The city also has an annual County A+L Fair. The event has regular rides and food booths, but also has local activities and food. Plenty of companies and non-profits set up food stands to advertise and raise money/awareness. In addition, there is a large seating area/stadium where there is a beauty pageant and music.

=== Museums and other points of interest ===
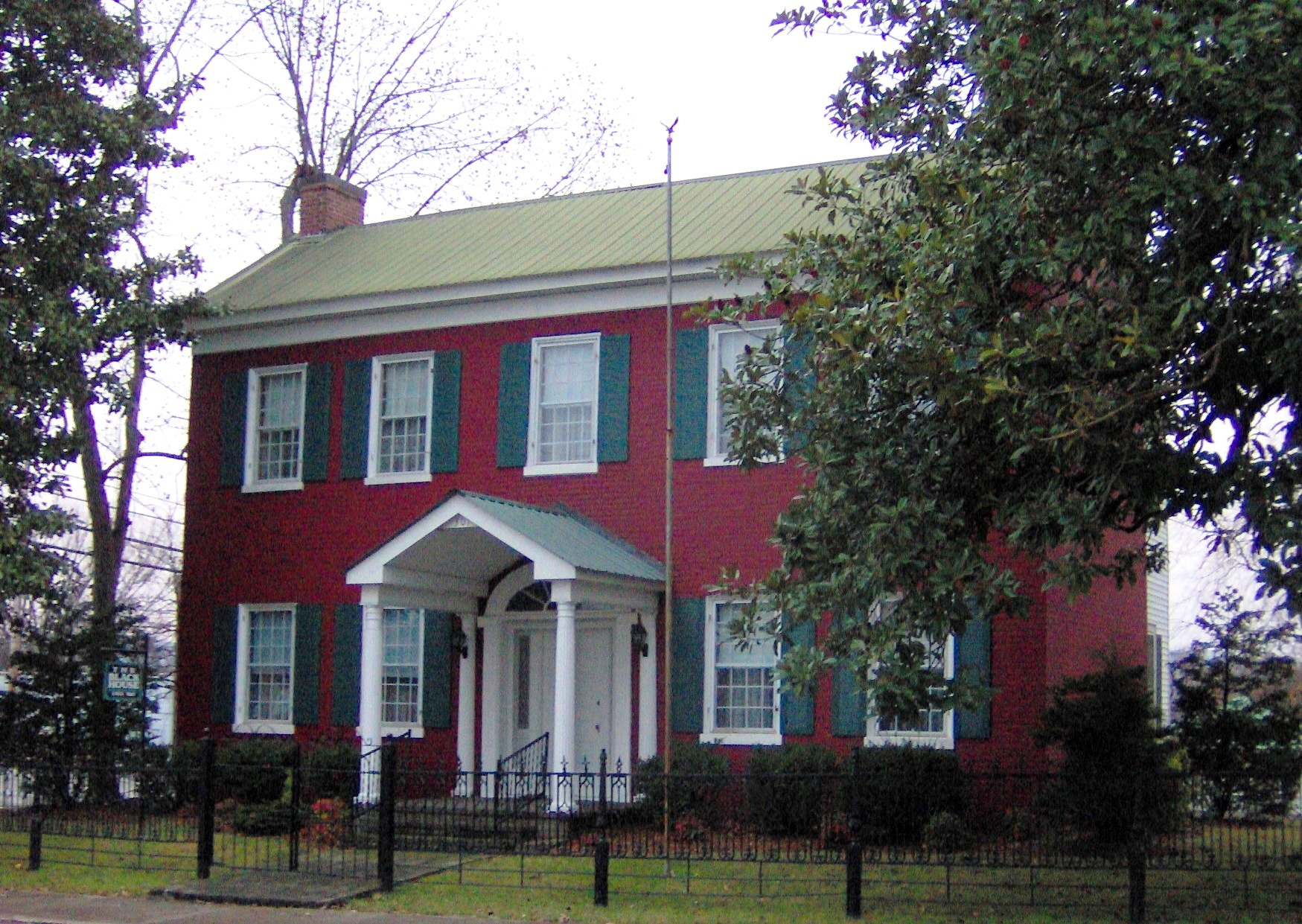
The Black House

Falcon Rest, built in 1896, once served as the home of entrepreneur Clay Faulkner and his family. A large 10,000 square feet (900 m^{2}), at the time of its completion it featured electric lights, indoor plumbing and central heat. PBS described the home as "Tennessee's Biltmore" due to its innovations and grandeur. In the 1940s the home was made into a hospital and nursing home and was eventually renamed Faulkner Springs Hospital. In 1989 George McGlothin bought the house and renovated it to its former 1896 appearance. In 1992 the house was placed on the National Register of Historic Places. The renovations earned the house the National Trust for Historic Preservation's Great American Home Award in 1997. The house is open to the public for tours, shopping, dining, and special events. It also claims to be the home to a "friendly ghost". The Black House is the oldest remaining residence in the city. Built in 1825 by Jesse Coffee, it was one of the first in the area to have a brick exterior. Its current name stems from former occupant Dr. Thomas Black and his family. Dr. Black was a Confederate surgeon during the Civil War and purchased the home following the war. Dr. Black practiced medicine at the house. In the 1980s it was deeded to his relative, Jean Leonard, who worked with the Eagle Club to begin restoration on the house. The house serves as a museum and provides tours to the public. In 1983 the house was added to the National Register of Historic Places.

The Confederate Monument in downtown McMinnville next to the county courthouse was dedicated to the memory of the citizens and men of Warren County and McMinnville who served in the 16th TN Infantry during the Civil War from 1861 to 1865. It list the names of the men who served in honor of their bravery and sacrifice.

The Park Theatre, in downtown McMinnville, was opened in 1939. The theater had 1000 seats and two restaurants. In 1947 a fire closed the theater and in 1948 it was reopened again after renovations. The theater closed in 1986 and a private group has since purchased the building. It has undergone renovations and has reopened as an entertainment center and multi-use facility. The former McMinnville Opera House, built in 1888 by African American entrepreneur William Hawchins, burnt down in 2008. The opera house held the city's first silent film showing. Two churches in Downtown McMinnville are listed on the National Register of Historic Places: the First Methodist Church and First Presbyterian Church.

== Parks & Rec ==
McMinnville serves as home to Cumberland Caverns and Court Square Park. Cumberland Caverns is the largest show cave in the state. At a total of 27.7 miles of cave, Cumberland Caverns formerly held the title of the second largest cave in the United States. A notable feature of the caverns is the "Volcano Room", which is large enough to hold 900 people and features a chandelier from the former Loews Metropolitan Theater of New York City. The McMinnville Parks and Recreation Department manages five city parks, the McMinnville Farmers Market, the Barren Fork Greenway, a playground, and local sports leagues. The parks department also manages the McMinnville Civic Center, which serves as a community center for sports and special events.

== Sports ==
The city also hosts the McMinnville City Triathlon in August. The event features a 200-meter swim, 11.5 mile bike ride and a 2-mile run.

== Sister city relations ==
- Mikawa, Yamagata, Japan
- (United States) McMinnville, Oregon

== Notable people ==
- Charles Faulkner Bryan, music composer, musician and musicologist of folk music was born on July 29, 1911, in McMinnville. He would eventually leave to attend the Nashville Conservatory of Music.
- Duke Droese, wrestler, "Duke the Dumpster"
- Asa Faulkner, owner of mills, member of the Tennessee House of Representatives from 1865 to 1866 and the Tennessee Senate from 1869 to 1871; built Falconhurst.
- Benjamin J. Hill was a Confederate States Army brigadier general during the American Civil War. Before the war, he was a merchant and served in the Tennessee Senate. After the war, he was a merchant, lawyer and president of the McMinnville and Manchester Railroad.
- Uncle Dave Macon, Country music legend born just outside McMinnville. Macon would go on to move to Nashville in 1884. A memorial at the Warren County Courthouse memorializes his birth and is built of brick from the home of his birth.
- David R. Ray, Posthumous Medal of Honor recipient was born in McMinnville in 1945.
- Sophia Foster Richardson (1855–1916), mathematician at Vassar College.
- Carl Rowan, United States government official, journalist and author was raised in McMinnville and attended Bernard School. Born in Ravenscroft in 1925, he worked in the nurseries of McMinnville, hoeing bulbs as a teenager for $.10 per hour.
- Col. John Houston Savage of McMinnville TN served the United States Army in the War with Mexico and served as a member of the House of Representatives. Col. Savage later commanded the Confederate 16th TN Infantry formed out of Warren County and helped to personally finance the Confederate memorial in downtown McMinnville to their memory for future generations.
- Dinah Shore grew up in McMinnville, where her family moved in 1924 and her father owned a department store.
- Lester Strode, Chicago Cubs bullpen coach was born and raised in McMinnville. Born in 1958, he was one of eight African Americans in a class of 500 at Warren County Senior High School. He credits his experience of being a minority and the relationship with his high school coach as shaping his decisions as a sports professional. In 2006, the high school retired his uniform number.
- John Templeton, Singer, pastor, and father to Carter Templeton among other children.
- Pamela Rogers Turner, teacher and child rapist
- Jamie Walker, pro baseball player was born in McMinnville in 1971.
- Dottie West, country music legend was born just outside McMinnville in 1932 in the Frog Pond community. Her mother owned the once noted "Park Grill" downtown where Dottie often helped out waitressing. West is buried in the town's Mt View Cemetery.
- Randy Wood, who was born in McMinnville on March 30, 1917, founded Dot Records, one of the most successful independent record labels of the 1950s and 1960s.
- Drew Green is a country music singer-songwriter who was born and raised in McMinnville.
