= Sherwood (surname) =

Sherwood is a surname, and may refer to:

- Adrian Sherwood (born 1958), English record producer
- Alf Sherwood (1923–1990), Welsh footballer
- Andrew Sherwood (born 1980), American politician
- Arthur Percy Sherwood (1854–1940), Canadian Commissioner of Police
- Ben Sherwood (born 1964), American writer, journalist and producer
- Bill Sherwood (1952–1990), American musician, screenwriter and film director
- Billy Sherwood (born 1965), American musician and two-time and current member of the band Yes
- Bobby Sherwood (1914–1981), American bandleader and composer
- Brad Sherwood (born 1964), American actor
- Brandi Sherwood (born 1971), former Miss USA and Miss Teen USA and a model on The Price is Right
- Carlton Sherwood (1946–2014), American journalist
- Charles D. Sherwood (1833–1895), American politician
- Cyril Sherwood (1915–1996), Canadian politician and farmer
- Davetta Sherwood (born 1984), American actress and musician
- David Sherwood (born 1980), British tennis coach and former player
- Dominic Sherwood (born 1990), English actor
- Don Sherwood (politician) (born 1941), American politician
- Don Sherwood (cartoonist) (1930–2010), American cartoonist and illustrator
- Frances Sherwood (1940–2021), American writer, novelist, and educator
- Franklin D. Sherwood (1841–1907), American politician and member of the New York State Senate
- Gale Sherwood (1929–2017), Canadian singer and actress
- George Sherwood (disambiguation), multiple people
- Grace Sherwood (1660–1740), last known person convicted of witchcraft in Colonial Virginia
- Henry Sherwood (disambiguation), multiple people
- Holly Sherwood, American singer who performed mostly in the 1980s with Jim Steinman
- Isaac R. Sherwood (1835–1925), American politician and newspaper editor
- Ivan Sherwood Verny (1798-1867), Russian Imperial Army officer of English descent
- James Sherwood (1933–2020), American businessman
- Jamien Sherwood (born 2000), American football player
- Jim Sherwood (1942–2011), American rock musician
- John Sherwood (disambiguation), multiple people
- Kate Brownlee Sherwood (1841–1914), American poet, journalist, translator
- Katherine Sherwood (born 1952), American artist
- Kiefer Sherwood (born 1995), professional ice hockey player
- Leonid Sherwood (1871–1954), Russian sculptor and architect
- Levi Sherwood (born 1991), New Zealand freestyle motocross
- Levius Peters Sherwood (1777–1850), lawyer, judge and politician in Upper Canada
- Lyman Sherwood (1802–1865), New York politician
- Madeleine Sherwood (1922–2016), Canadian actress
- Margaret Pollock Sherwood (1864–1955), American novelist and short-story writer
- Marika Sherwood (1937–2025), Hungarian-born historian, researcher, educator and author
- Mark Sherwood (born 1970), American politician
- Martha Allen Sherwood (1948– 2020) – American lichenologist
- Mary Sherwood (1856–1935), American physician and public health advocate
- Mary Elizabeth Wilson Sherwood (1830–1903), American author and socialite
- Mary Martha Sherwood (1775–1851), English writer of children's literature
- Michael Sherwood (1959–2019), American musician and singer
- Michael Sherwood (banker) (born 1965), British banker, vice-chairman of Goldman Sachs
- Milton Sherwood (born 1939), Canadian politician
- Oliver Sherwood (born 1955), English racehorse trainer
- Percy Sherwood (1866–1939), German-born English composer and pianist
- Peter M. A. Sherwood, American professor
- Phyllis Sherwood (1937–2007), Playboy Playmate of the Month for August 1963
- Raymond Sherwood (1899–1965), American lyricist
- Robert Edmund Sherwood (1864–1946), American clown and author
- Robert E. Sherwood (1896–1955), American playwright, editor, and screenwriter
- Samuel Sherwood (disambiguation), multiple people
- Sheila Sherwood (born 1945), British retired long jumper
- Shirley Sherwood (born 1933), collector and author of books about botanical illustrations
- Thomas Sherwood (disambiguation), multiple people
- Tim Sherwood (born 1969), English football manager and international footballer
- Trey Sherwood, American politician
- Vladimir Osipovich Sherwood (1832–1897), Russian architect
- Vladimir Vladimirovich Sherwood (1867–1930), Russian architect
- Will Sherwood (1871–1955), British trade unionist and politician
- Winfield S. Sherwood (1817–1870), American politician

== See also ==
- Sharwood
