= Sherwood =

Sherwood may refer to:

== Places ==
=== Australia ===
- Sherwood, Queensland, a suburb of Brisbane
- Sherwood, South Australia, a locality
- Shire of Sherwood, a former local government area of Queensland
- Electoral district of Sherwood, an electoral district from 1950 to 1992

=== Canada ===
- Sherwood, Calgary, Alberta, a neighborhood
- Sherwood, Edmonton, Alberta, a neighborhood
- Sherwood Park, the seat of Strathcona County, Alberta
- Sherwood, Ontario, a community in Huron Shores
- Sherwood, Ontario, a community in Maple, Ontario
- Sherwood, Nova Scotia, a community
- Sherwood, Prince Edward Island, a neighborhood of Charlottetown
- Rural Municipality of Sherwood No. 159, Saskatchewan

=== Finland ===
- Sherwood, a nickname of Kerava

=== Jamaica ===
- Sherwood Content, a town

=== United Kingdom ===
- Sherwood Forest, north of the city of Nottingham, England; the place where the legendary Robin Hood is said to have lived
- Sherwood, Nottingham, a residential area of Nottingham
- Sherwood (UK Parliament constituency)

=== United States ===
==== Lakes ====
- Lake Sherwood (California), a reservoir
- Lake Sherwood (Kansas)
- Lake Sherwood (West Virginia), a reservoir

==== Settlements ====
- Sherwood, Arkansas, a city
- Lake Sherwood, California, a gated community
- Sherwood, Iowa, an unincorporated community
- Sherwood, Maryland, an unincorporated community
- Sherwood, Michigan, a village
- Sherwood Township, Michigan
- Sherwood, New York, a hamlet
- Sherwood, North Dakota, a city
- Sherwood, Defiance County, Ohio, a village
- Sherwood, Hamilton County, Ohio, a census-designated place
- Sherwood, Oregon, a city
- Sherwood, Tennessee, an unincorporated community
- Sherwood, Texas, a ghost town
- Sherwood, West Virginia, an unincorporated community
- Sherwood, Wisconsin, a village
- Sherwood (town), Wisconsin, a town

== Businesses ==
- Sherwood (company), a manufacturer of hi-fi equipment
- Sher-Wood, a maker of ice hockey equipment
- Sherwood Pictures, a Christian film production company

== Schools ==
- Sherwood College, Nainital, India
- Sherwood High School (disambiguation)
- Sherwood Academy, Gedling, Nottinghamshire, England
- Sherwood Middle School, Shrewsbury, Massachusetts, United States

== People ==
- Sherwood (surname)
- Sherwood (given name)

== Other uses ==
- Project Sherwood, the codename for a United States program in controlled nuclear fusion
- HMS Sherwood (I80), a Second World War Royal Navy destroyer
- Sherwood number, a mass-transfer number
- Sherwood (band), an American rock band
  - Sherwood (EP)
- Sherwood (2019 TV series), animated series that reimagines Robin Hood as dystopic science-fiction
- Sherwood (2022 TV series), British crime series set in Nottinghamshire
- Sherwood Baptist Church, Albany, Georgia
- Sherwood Station (disambiguation)

== See also ==
- Sherwood Forest (disambiguation)
- William of Sherwood, medieval logician
- Justice Sherwood (disambiguation)
