= Sherwood Forest (disambiguation) =

Sherwood Forest is a royal forest in Nottinghamshire, England, famous by its historical association with the legend of Robin Hood.

Sherwood Forest may also refer to:

== Places ==
Neighborhoods

- Sherwood Forest, Atlanta
- Sherwood Forest, Detroit
- Sherwood Forest (Charlotte neighborhood), Charlotte, North Carolina
- Sherwood Forest, Los Angeles

Unincorporated communities

- Sherwood Forest, Anne Arundel County, Maryland
- Sherwood Forest, Frederick County, Maryland
- Sherwood Forest, Montgomery County, Maryland
- Sherwood Forest, Worcester County, Maryland
- Sherwood Forest, Virginia

Other places

- Sherwood Forest, Massachusetts
- Sherwood Forest Plantation, a plantation in Virginia owned by two US presidents
- Sherwood Arboretum, an arboretum in Queensland, Australia. Initially known as Sherwood Forest Park

== Other uses ==
- Sherwood Forest (horse), a New Zealand racehorse
- Sherwood Forest (UK Parliament constituency)
- Sherwood Forest Bridge, in Saskatchewan, Canada
- Sherwood Forest Faire, an annual Renaissance fair in McDade, Texas.
- Sherwood Forest Railway, a miniature railway in England

== See also ==
- Sherwood Foresters, an infantry regiment of the British Army
