= Lost Cove =

Lost Cove may refer to

- Lost Cove, North Carolina, a ghost town in North Carolina
- Lost Cove, Tennessee, a valley in southern Tennessee
  - Lost Cove Cave
