= The Christian Index =

The Christian Index may refer to:

- a newspaper published by the Georgia Baptist Convention
- a magazine published by the Christian Methodist Episcopal Church
