= Justice Sherwood =

Justice Sherwood may refer to:

- Carl G. Sherwood (1855–1938), associate justice of the South Dakota Supreme Court
- Thomas Adiel Sherwood (judge) (1834–1918), associate justice and chief justice of the Missouri Supreme Court
- Thomas R. Sherwood (1827–1896), associate justice and chief justice of the Michigan Supreme Court

== See also ==
- Sherwood (disambiguation)
