= Robert Sherwood =

Robert Sherwood may refer to:

- Robert E. Sherwood (1896–1955), American playwright, editor, and biographer and speechwriter for President Franklin D. Roosevelt
- Robert Edmund Sherwood (1864–1946), American clown and author
- Bobby Sherwood (1914–1981), American bandleader
- Robert Sherwood (horseman) (1835–1894), British jockey and horse trainer
