= Thomas Sherwood =

Thomas Sherwood may refer to:

- Thomas Sherwood (martyr) (c. 1551–1578), English Catholic martyr
- Thomas Sherwood (Settler) (1586–1655), Early colonial settler
- Thomas Adiel Sherwood (1791–1879), American academic
- Thomas Kilgore Sherwood (1903–1976), American chemical engineer
- Thomas R. Sherwood (1827–1896), Chief Justice of the Michigan Supreme Court
- Thomas E. Sherwood (1835–1897), mayor of Dallas, Texas
- Thomas Adiel Sherwood (judge) (1834–1918), justice of the Missouri Supreme Court
- Thomas Sherwood (assemblyman), New York assemblyman 1843, see 66th New York State Legislature
