= George Sherwood =

George Sherwood may refer to:

- George Sherwood (Canadian politician) (1811–?), judge and political figure in Canada West
- George Sherwood (sculptor) (born 1954), American kinetic and environmental sculptor
- George Sherwood (British politician) (1878–1935), Member of Parliament for Wakefield, 1923–1924 and 1929–1931
- George Frederick Tudor Sherwood, (1867–1958), genealogist
- George Herbert Sherwood (1876–1937), American nature educator
