= Sewanee Elementary School =

Coordinates: 35.197303°N 85.921200°W

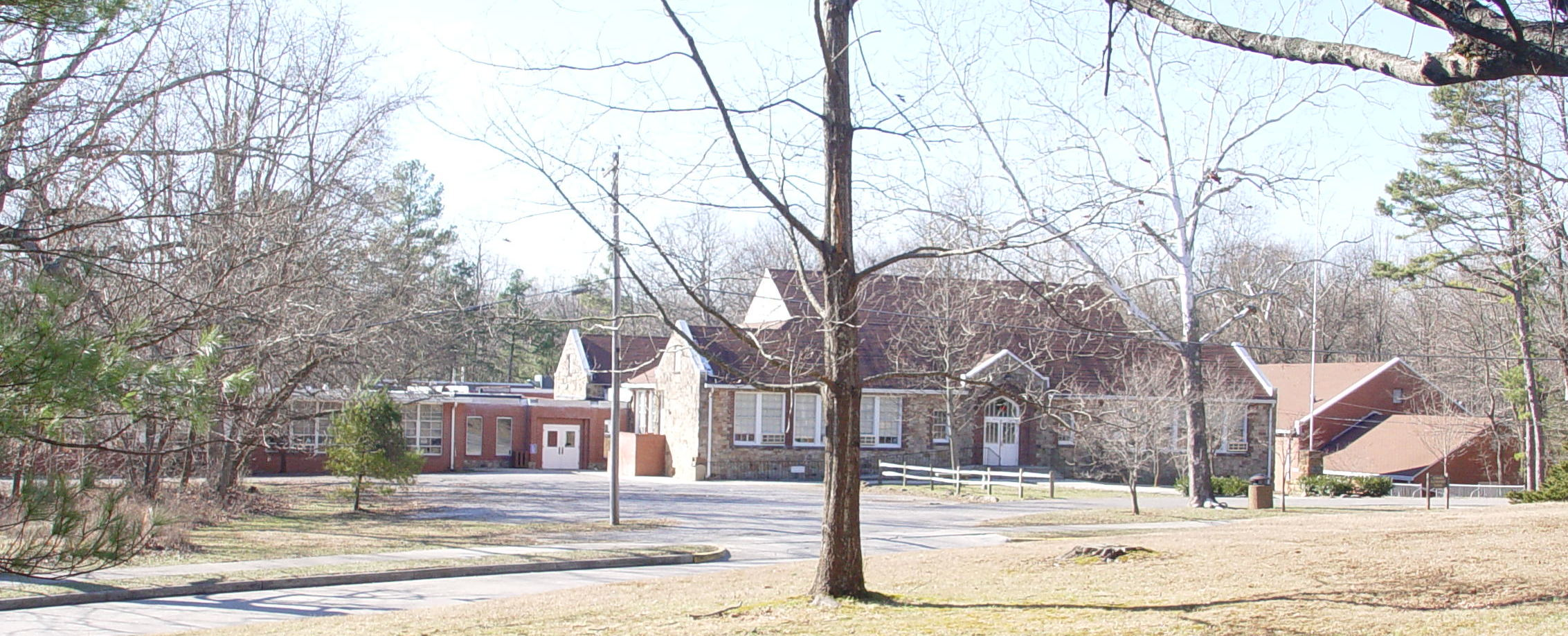

Location
- 209 University Avenue; Sewanee, Tennessee 37375; United States

Information
- School type: Public, Day
- Established: 1926
- Principal: Dietz, Allison
- Faculty: 21 teachers, 12 staff
- Grades: Kindergarten to 5
- Gender: Coeducational
- Enrollment: 176
- Campus type: Rural

Sewanee Elementary School is a public, coeducational elementary school in Sewanee, Tennessee that played a significant role during the integration of Tennessee Public Schools in the 1960s.

== Description ==
Sewanee Elementary School is an elementary school for grades kindergarten through year five and is in the Franklin County, Tennessee school district. It resides within the domain of the University of the South and serves Sewanee and nearby communities. It is housed in a 1926 sandstone main building with red-brick additions made in subsequent years. For each grade, there are typically two classes.

== History ==
The Sewanee Elementary School was founded in 1926 with the dedication of the present main school building. However, the school traces it antecedents to 1867 when the first public school was built on the mountain by Jabez Wheeler Hayes, an Episcopalian from New Jersey. Along with Hayes’ school, Saint-Paul's-On-The-Mountain, over time various other area schools were combined into Sewanee Elementary School including the school on Billy Goat Hill, The Kennerly School for African-American children, and the Sherwood, Tennessee elementary school.

== Desegregation ==
Since its inception, the school had been segregated and only attended by white children. African-American children attended a separate school nearby. In the early 1960s, members of the Sewanee community begin petitioning Franklin County, Tennessee to integrate the school. In 1964, the County lost an integration suit filed by eight families. This case was significant since it involved both white and African-American plaintiffs.

=== Tennessee Historical Commission Marker ===
To commemorate the desegregation, on January 19, 2014, a Tennessee Historical Commission marker was dedicated at the school.

==== The text of the marker reads ====
(Marker Front)

2E 79: DESEGREGATION OF FRANKLIN COUNTY PUBLIC SCHOOLS

Nine years after Brown v. Board of Education, eight local families initiated a lawsuit to compel Franklin County to desegregate the public school system. The plaintiffs included the Bates, Cameron, Camp, Goodstein, Hill, Sisk, Staten, and Turner families. They were represented by Nashville attorney Z. Alexander Looby and Jack Greenburg, Constance Banker Motley, and James M. Nabrit of the NAACP Legal Defense Fund. The case was successful, and in 1964, The U.S. District Court issued an order to desegregate the schools. This lawsuit was notable in that it involved both white and African-American plaintiffs.

(Marker Rear)

The Sewanee community raised funds to add four new classrooms to the Sewanee Public School, located at this site, this eliminating the argument that there was insufficient space to educate all the community's children together. Additionally, during the summer of 1964, Sewanee residents offered tutoring across the street at Otey Parish. This effort countered a second argument that African American children would not be adequately prepared to join their white children.

Tennessee Historical Commission

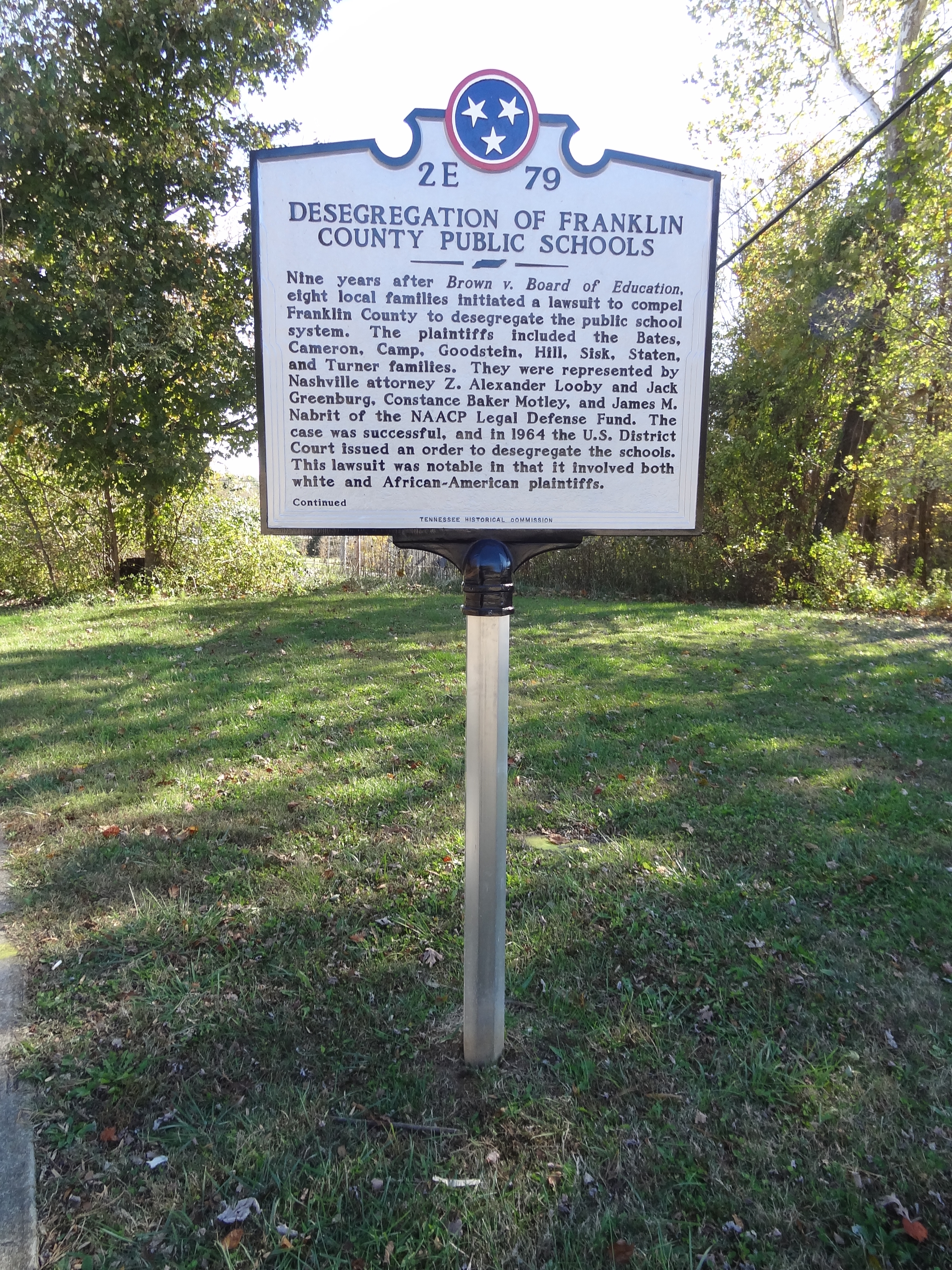
Marker front

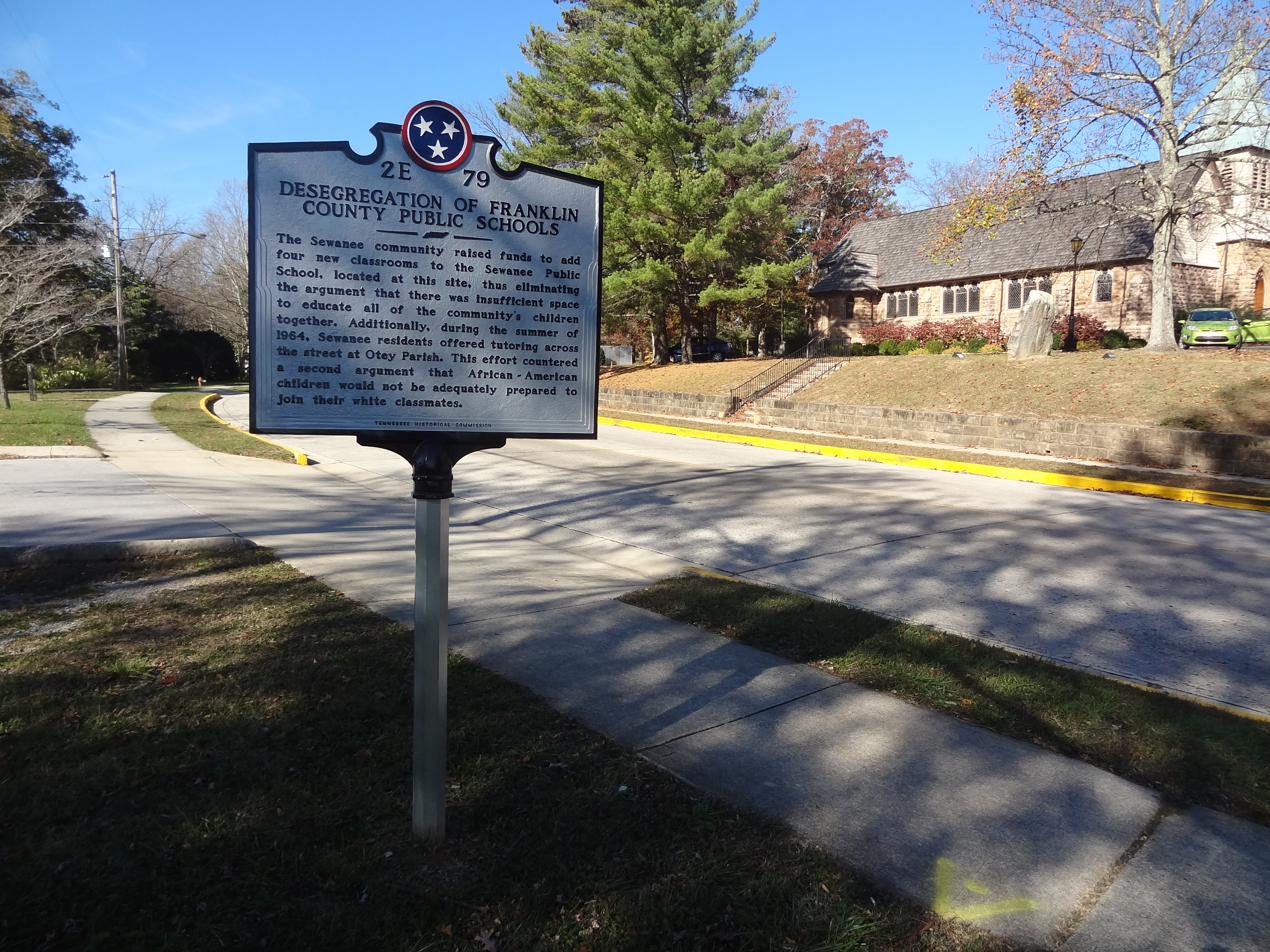
Marker rear with Otey Parish in the background

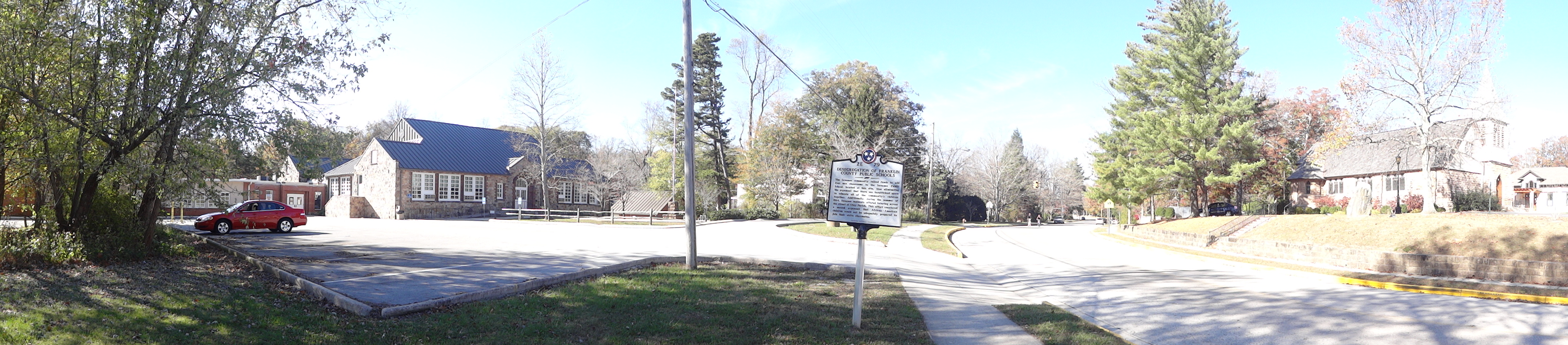
Panoramic of the school and Otey Parish church

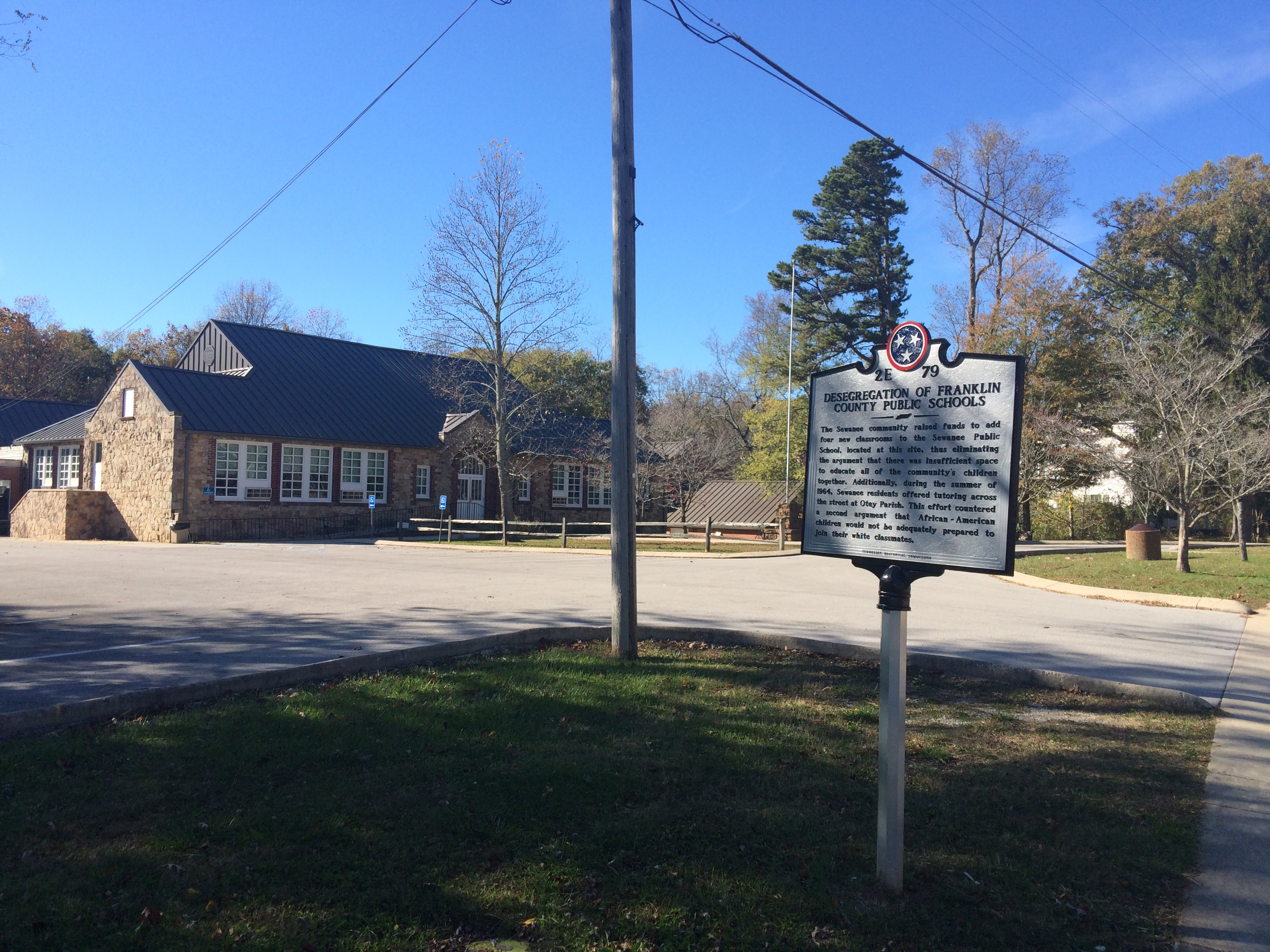
School with Marker
