= Sharwood =

Sharwood is an English surname. Notable people with the surname include:

- John E. Sharwood Smith (1919–2007), English classicist
- Mike Sharwood Smith (born 1942), English linguist

== See also ==
- Sharwood's, British company
- Sherwood (disambiguation)
