= Adiel Sherwood =

American author and college president

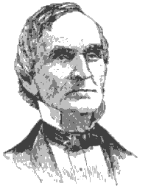
Adiel Sherwood

Thomas Adiel Sherwood (October 3, 1791 – August 19, 1879) was an American writer and college president of Marshall College.

== Biography ==
Sherwood was born in Fort Edward, New York, on October 3, 1791. His father was major Adiel Sherwood, an officer under Washington at Valley Forge and in the battle of Monmouth. Sherwood attended Middlebury College in Vermont and Union College in New York City. In 1819, he moved to Savannah, Georgia, where he involved himself with the Baptist ministry. He was instrumental in the founding of the Georgia Baptist Convention. He introduced and widened the support of the temperance movement after moving to Georgia. While in Georgia, his manual-labor system helped inspire the founding of Mercer University and in 1857, he became president of Marshall College in Griffin, Georgia. Between 1827 and 1860, he collected statistical information on Georgia's counties and place names, which he compiled into his publication A Gazetteer of the State of Georgia. Sherwood published as many as five different editions between the years of 1827 and 1860. After his farm in Butts County, Georgia was burned by Sherman's troops in the American Civil War, Sherwood moved to Missouri, where he died on August 19, 1879, aged 87. He was married to Emma Heriot, his second wife after his first wife (Anna Adams Smith, the widow of Governor Peter Early) died in 1822, a year into their marriage. Their daughter died the same year. He had five children with Emma. One son, Thomas Adiel Sherwood, served as a justice of the Missouri Supreme Court from 1873 to 1902.

== Selected works ==
- A Gazetteer of the State of Georgia (2nd ed.) at the Internet Archive (1829)
- The Jewish & Christian churches; or, The Hebrew congregation and Christian church, distinct organizations at the Internet Archive (1854)
- A gazetteer of Georgia (4th ed.) at the Internet Archive (1860)
- "Suffering disciples rejoicing in persecution," Acts 5: 41 : the introductory discourse, delivered before the Georgia Baptist Convention, at Americus, Georgia, April, 1858 at the Internet Archive (1861)
- Conversation in a tent at the Internet Archive (1862)
- Proclamation!: north riding of Leeds and Grenville, to wit : public notice is hereby given to the electors of the north riding of Leeds & Grenville ... for the purpose of electing a person to represent them in the Legislative Assembly at the Internet Archive (1863)
