= Lost Cove Cave =

Cave in Tennessee, United States

- Buggytop Cave
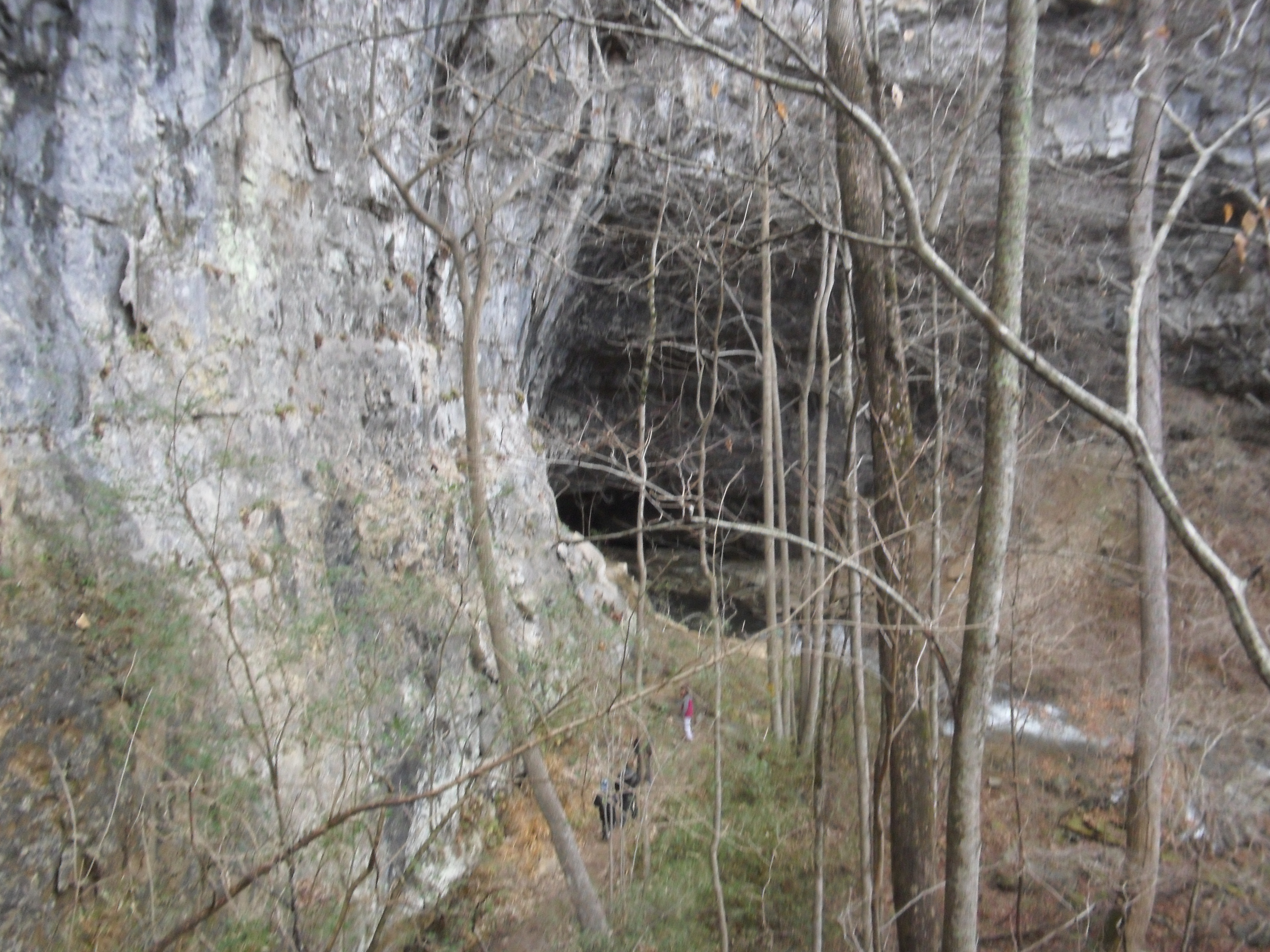
- Buggytop Entrance
- Interactive map of Lost Cove Cave
- Location: Franklin County, Tennessee, United States
- Coordinates: 35°07′11″N 85°54′37″W
- Geology: limestone
- Entrances: 3
- Entrances list: Buggytop, Great Room, Peter
- Difficulty: Easy to moderate
- Hazards: Falling Rocks, Slippery Surfaces, Cliffs
- Access: Public
- Lighting: None
- Features: Lavacicles

Lost Cove Cave, also known as Buggytop Cave, is a cave in Franklin County, south Tennessee near the towns of Sewanee and Sherwood and close to the Alabama border. It is noted for its large main entrance and the extensive archeological artifacts of the Woodland and Mississippian periods found inside.

== Description ==
Lost Cove Cave is a part of the Carter Natural Area section of South Cumberland State Park and is located in Lost Cove. It has three notable entrances: the main or Buggytop entrance which is 100 feet (30 m) wide and 80 feet (24 m) high, the second or Great Room entrance which was formed by the collapse of an upper section of the mid-cave area, and the third or Peter Cave entrance. The Peter Cave entrance opens into the so-called Indian Room which has been excavated for archeological artifacts since the 19th century.

Lost Cove Creek (or sometimes simply Lost Creek) is a river that enters the cave from Lost Cove at the Big Sinks and emerges from the Buggytop Entrance of the cave as Crow Creek into Crow Creek Valley. From there it flows through Sherwood, Tennessee before emptying into the Tennessee River at Guntersville Lake near Stevenson, Alabama, several miles to the south.

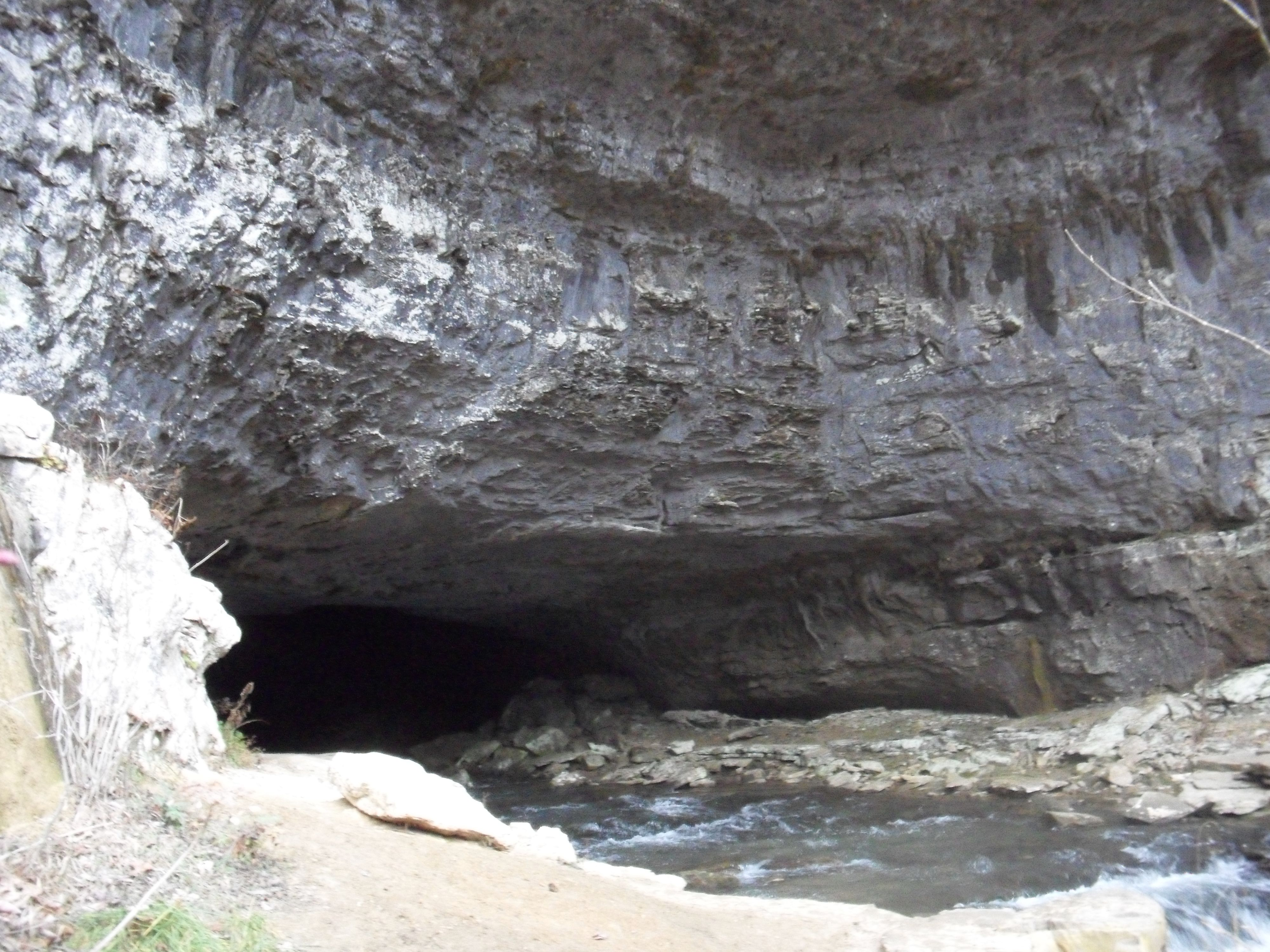
Lost Cove Cave Main "Buggytop" Entrance with Lost Creek flowing out

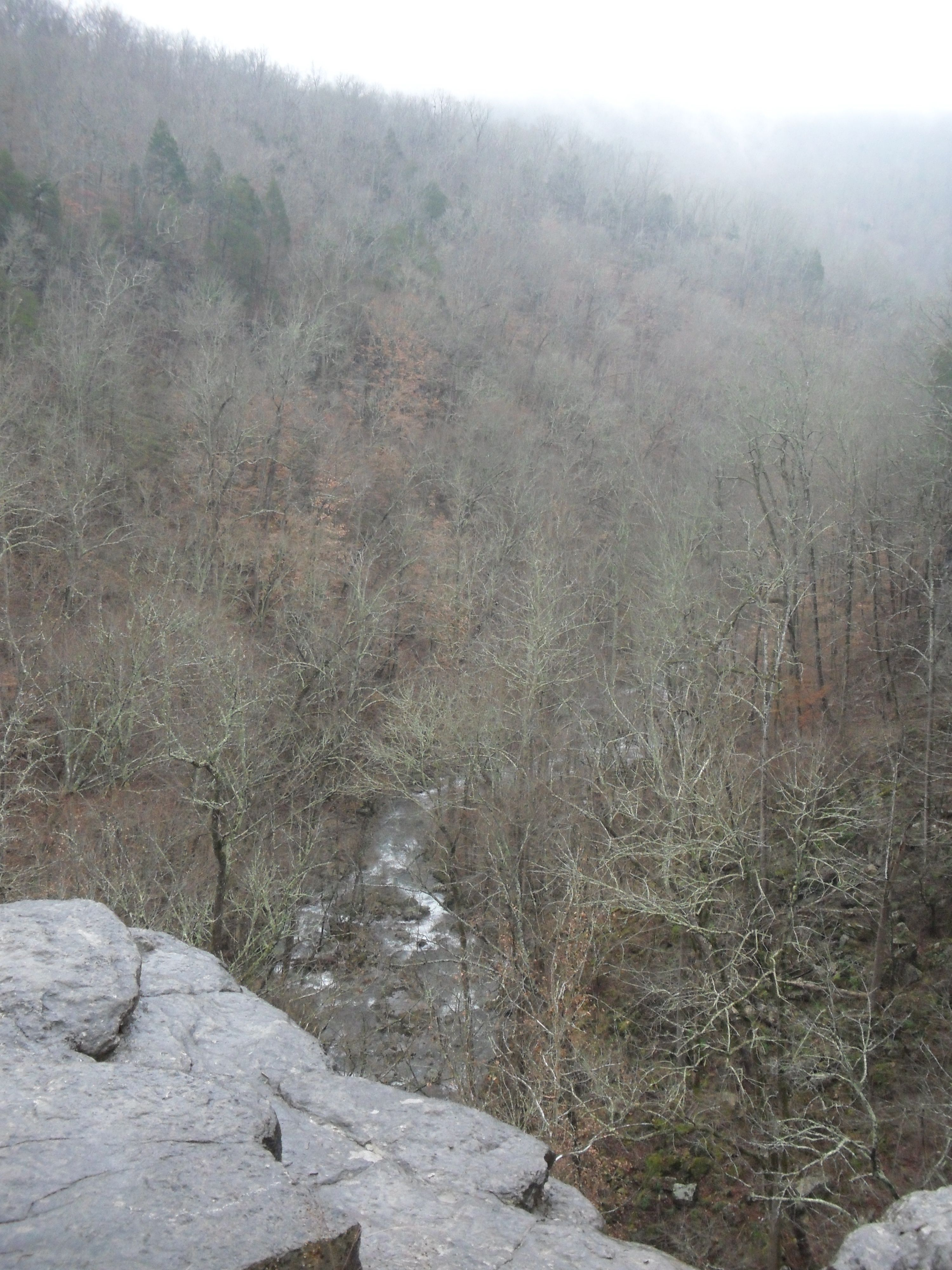
View from the cliff above the "Buggytop" Entrance. Lost Creek can be seen flowing into Lost Cove.

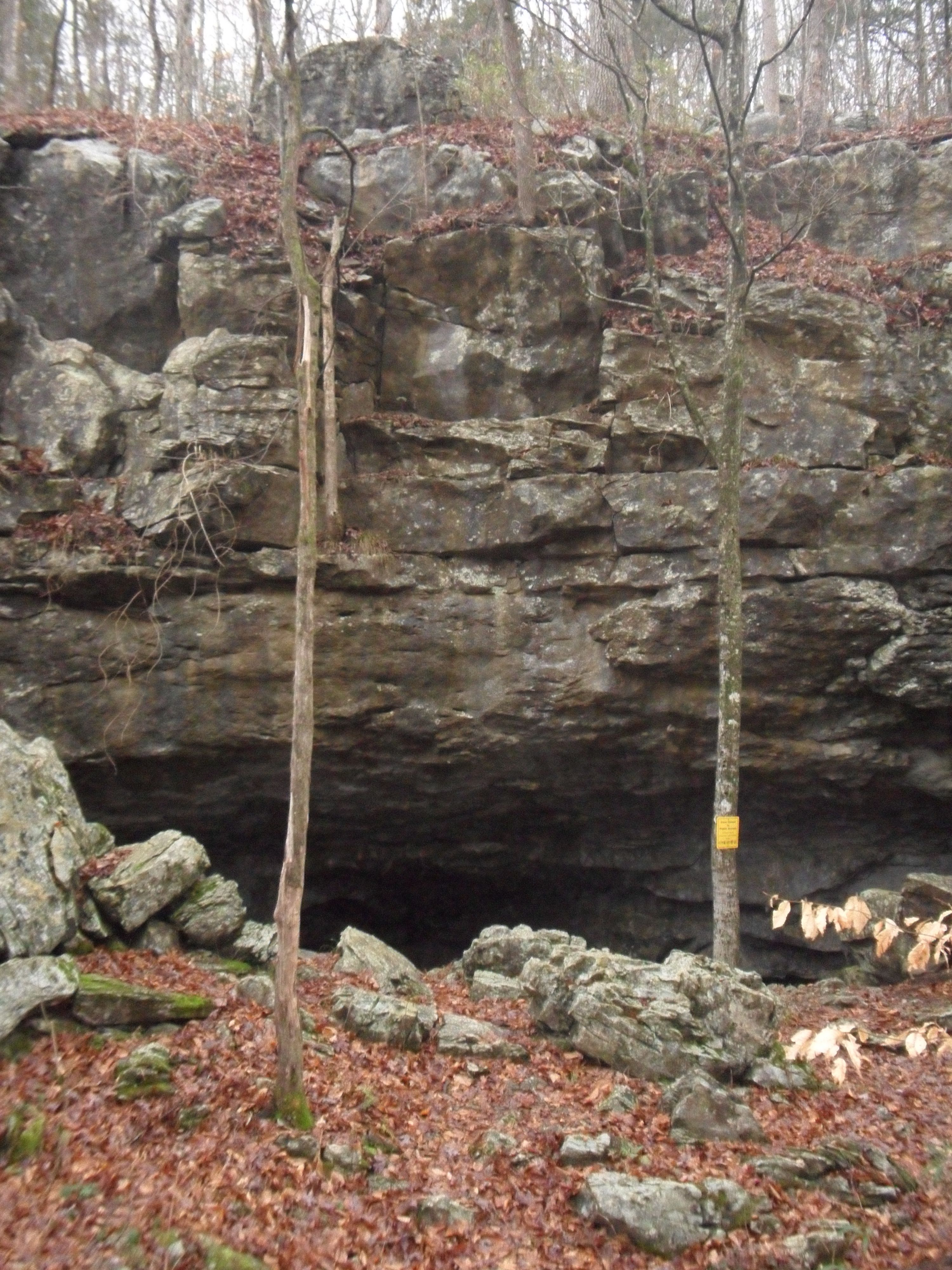
The Second or Great Room Entrance into Lost Cove Cave

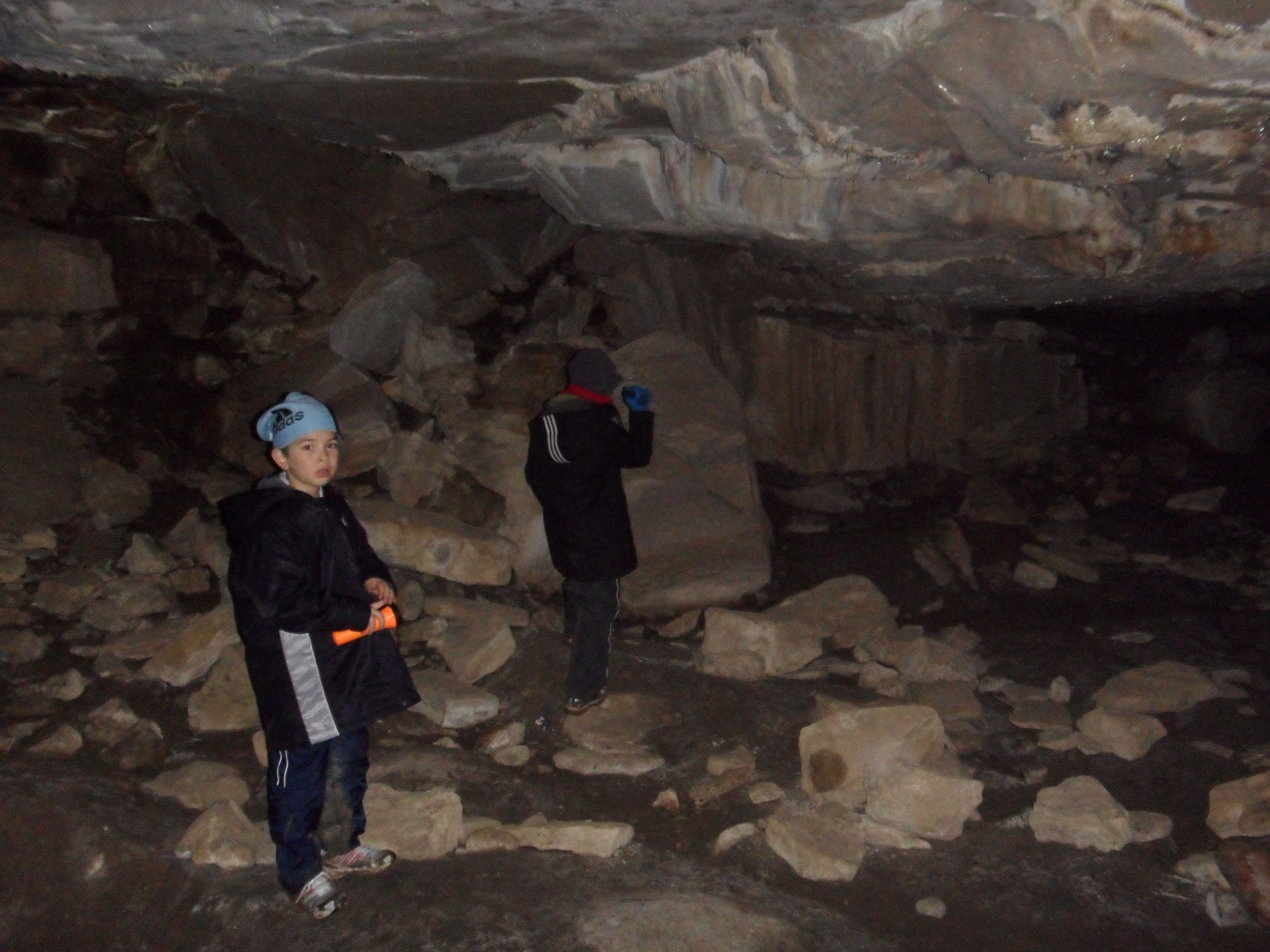
Interior of Peter Cave or the so-called "Indian Room"

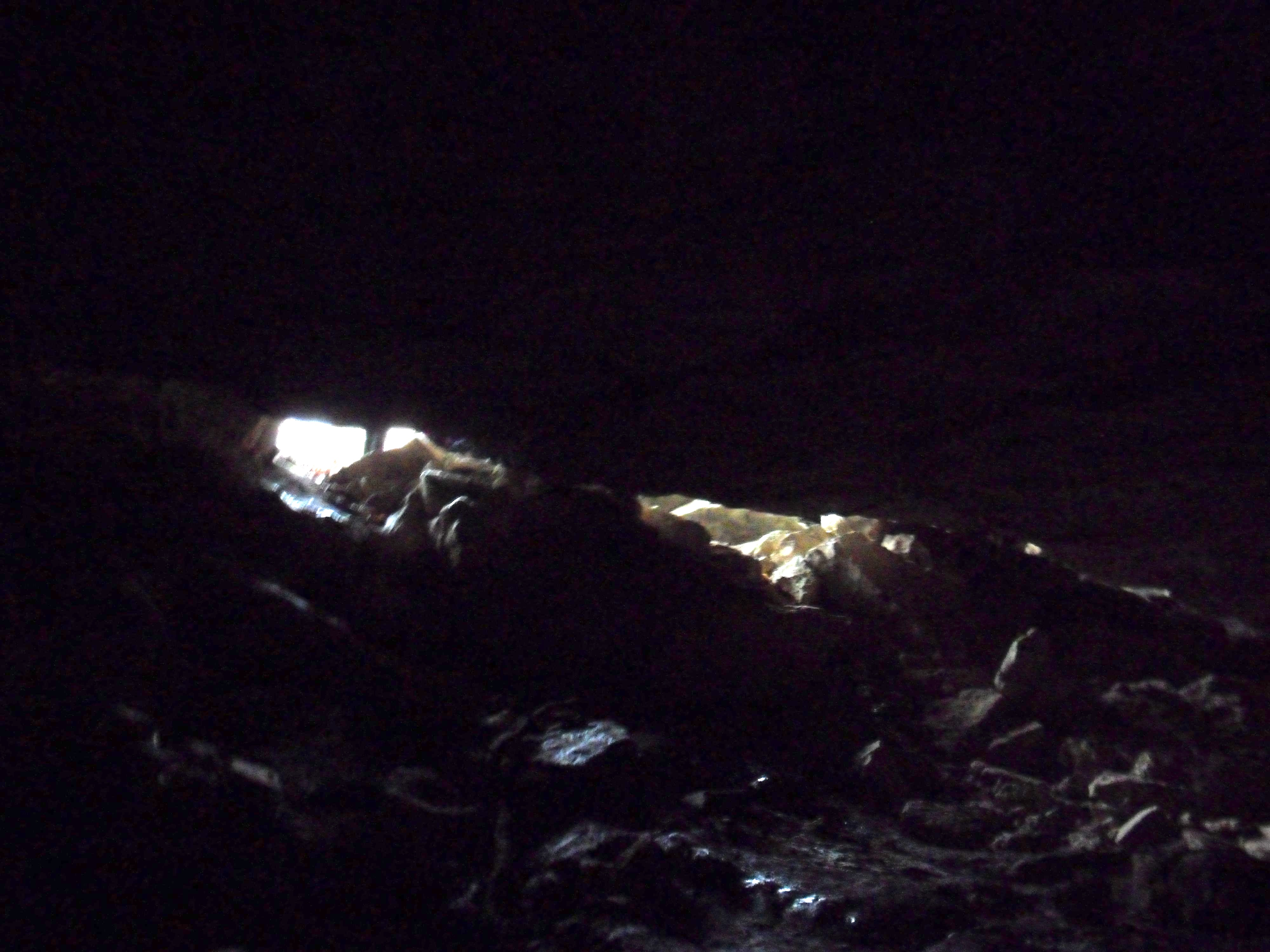
Peter Cave or the so-called "Indian Room" entrance from the interior

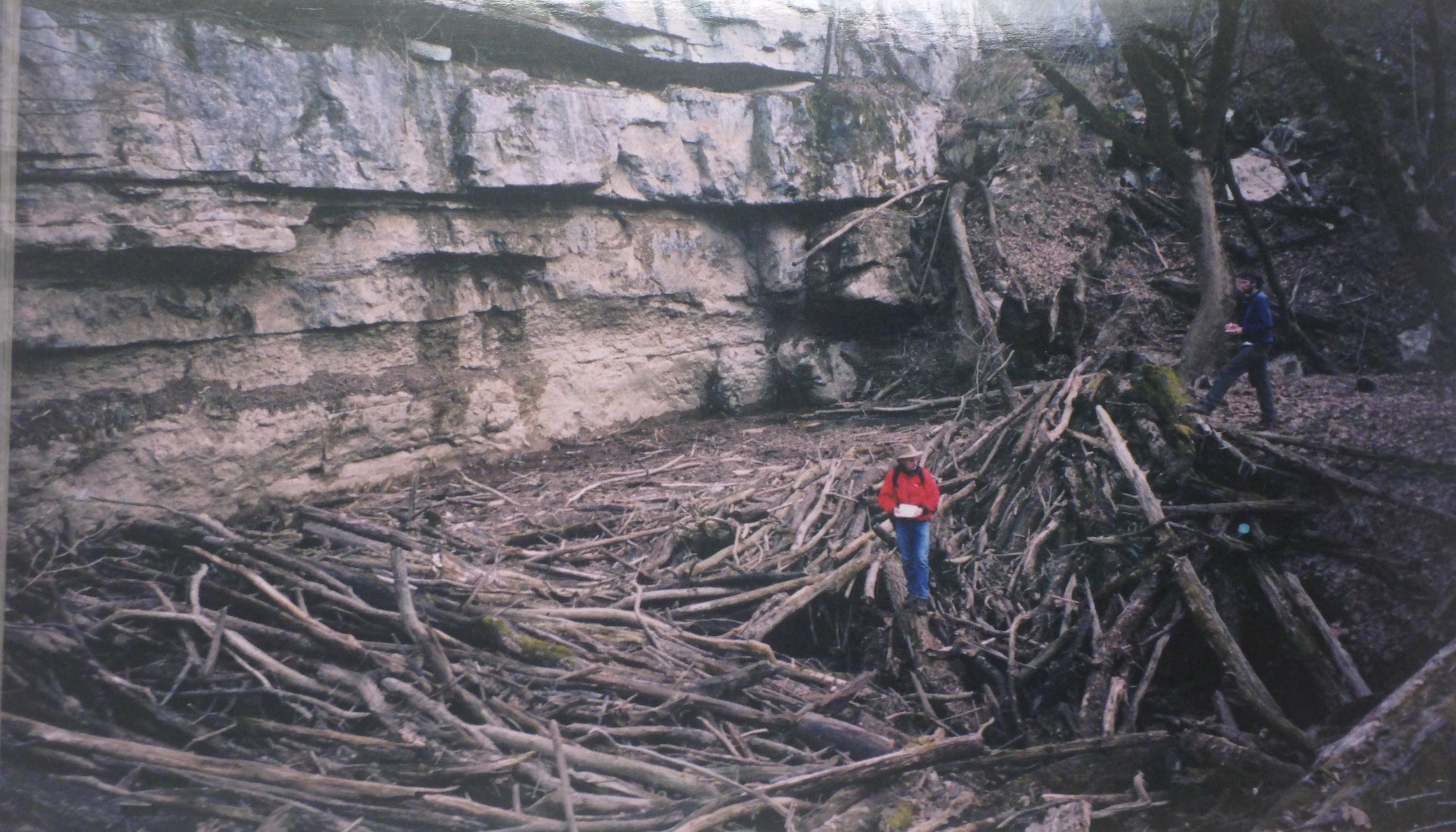
The "Big Sink", obscured by debris, is where Lost Creek enters into the cave.

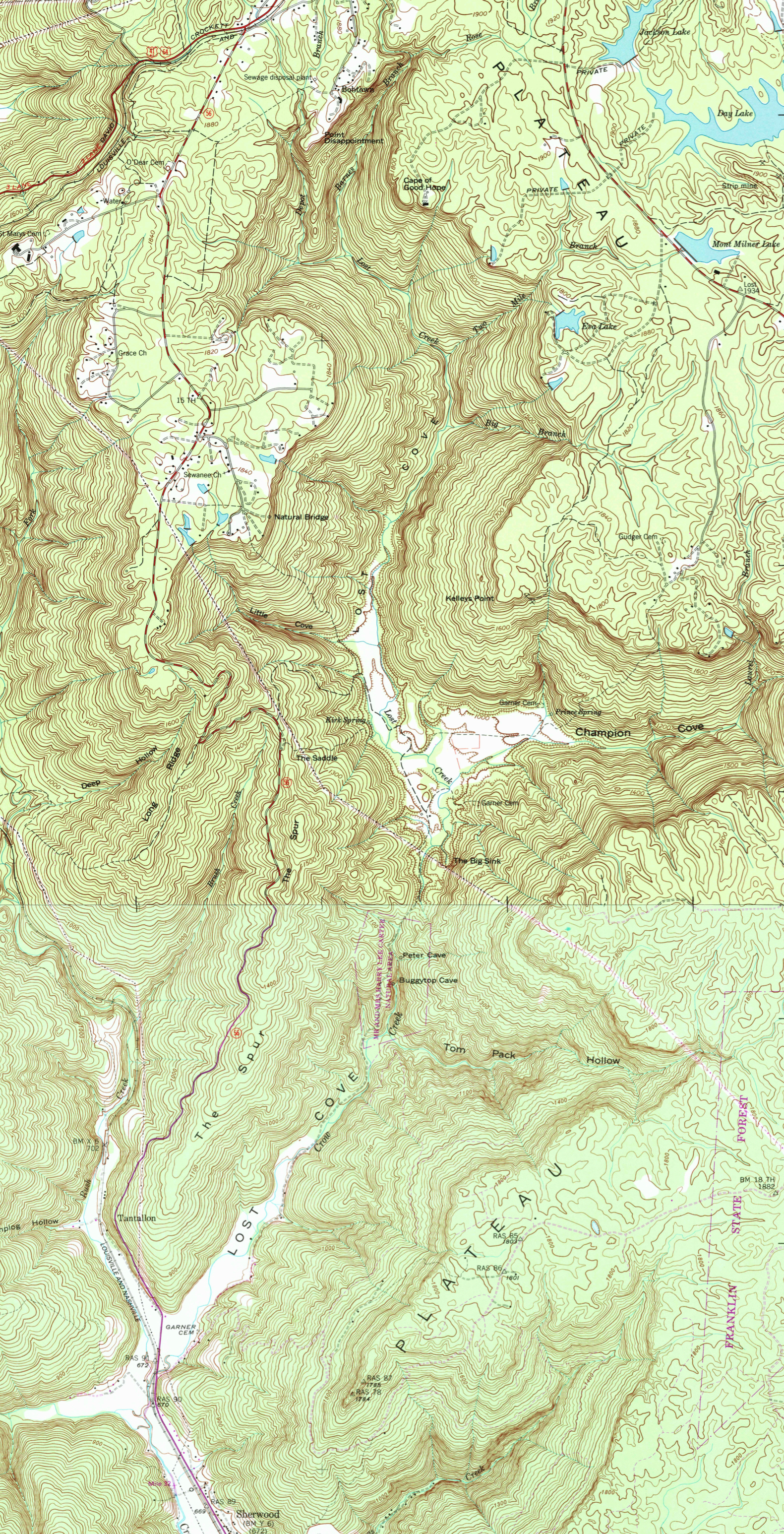
USGS Map of Lost Cove - The cave is in the map center

Archaeological work by students accomplished between 1959 and 1961 was published in The Tennessee Archaeologist, Vol. XVIII, No. 1 pp. 408 -430
