= Sherwood station =

Sherwood station may refer to:

- Sherwood railway station, station on the former Great Northern Railway Nottingham Suburban railway in Nottingham, England
- Sherwood Park railway station, Victoria, Australia
- Sherwood railway station, Brisbane, Queensland, Australia
- Sherwood railway station, Perth, Western Australia, Australia
