= Peter M. A. Sherwood =

American educator

Peter Miles Anson Sherwood is Dean Emeritus and Regents Professor, emeritus, College of Arts and Sciences at Oklahoma State University, Oklahoma, United States. He is also a University Distinguished Professor Emeritus of Chemistry at Kansas State University.

He obtained his B.Sc. at St. Andrews University, Scotland; and Chemistry: M.A., Ph.D., Sc.D. at Cambridge University.
