= Sherwood Forest, Worcester County, Maryland =

Unincorporated community in Maryland, United States

Sherwood Forest, Maryland
- Unincorporated community
- Location within Maryland
- Coordinates: 38°22′03″N 75°09′02″W
- Country: United States
- State: Maryland
- County: Worcester
- Elevation: 10 ft (3.0 m)
- Time zone: UTC-5 (Eastern (EST))
  - Summer (DST): UTC-4 (EDT)
- ZIP code: 21811
- Area codes: 410, 443, and 667
- GNIS feature ID: 1669038

Sherwood Forest is an unincorporated community in Worcester County, Maryland, United States. Sherwood Forest is located in the southern portion of Ocean Pines.
