= Henry Sherwood (disambiguation) =

Henry Sherwood (1807–1855) was a Canadian politician.

Henry Sherwood may also refer to:

- Henry Sherwood (congressman) (1813–1896), US congressman from Pennsylvania
- Henry Sherwood (New York politician) (1824–1875), New York politician
- Henry Burr Sherwood (1829–1906), inventor, miller, farmer of Westport, Connecticut
