= Georgia Baptist Mission Board =

The Georgia Baptist Mission Board is the executive committee of the Georgia Baptist Convention, which is a voluntary association of Baptist churches in the U.S. state of Georgia. It is one of the state conventions associated with the Southern Baptist Convention. Formed in 1822, it was one of the original nine state conventions to send delegates to the first Southern Baptist Convention, organized in 1845.

== History ==
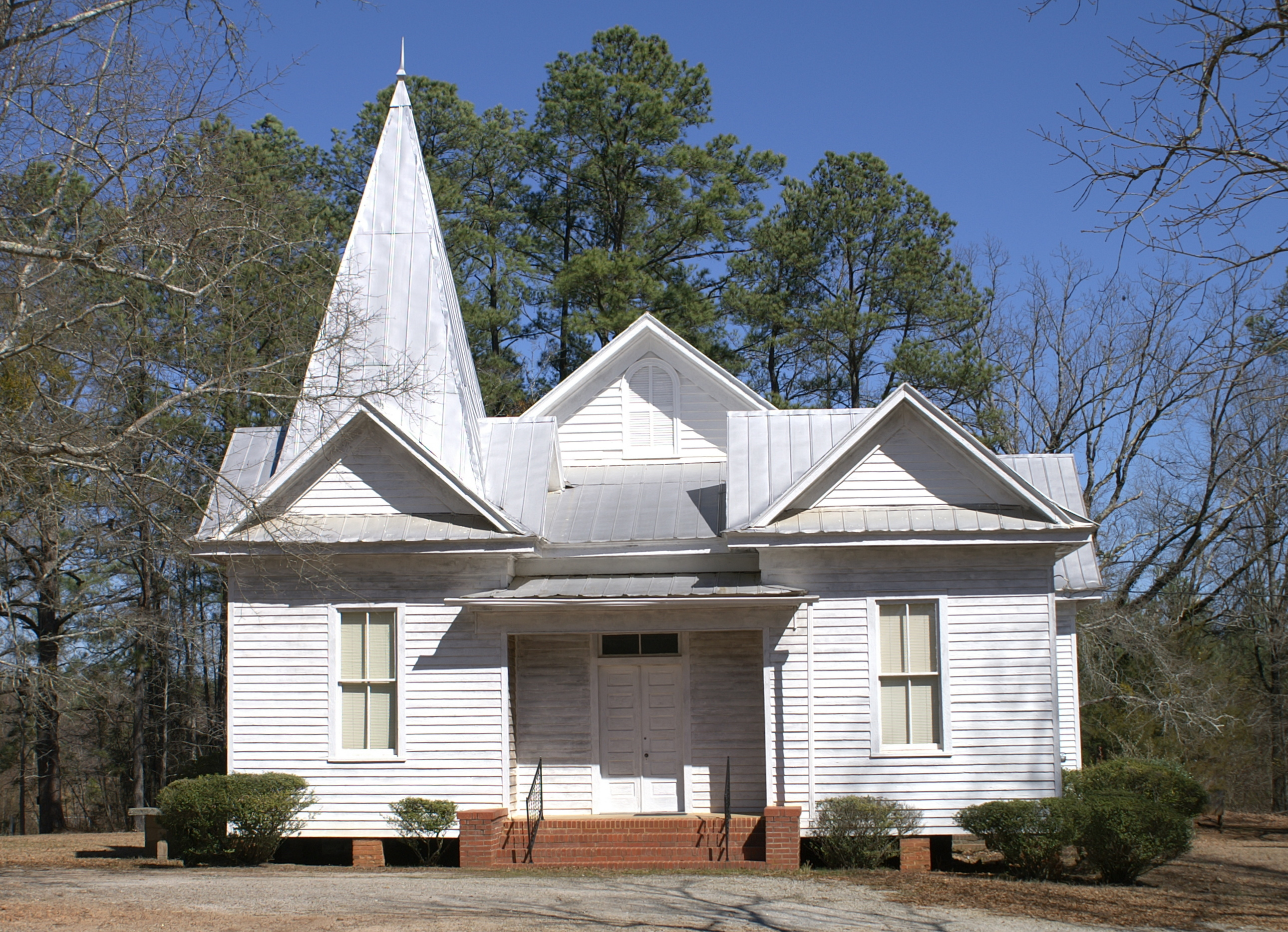
Powelton Baptist Church

Resolved, that we suggest for our consideration, and respectfully that of sister associations in this State, the propriety of organizing a General meeting of Correspondence.

— Adiel Sherwood, resolution presented by Charles J. Jenkins

The convention was formed at the instigation of Adiel Sherwood, who drew up a resolution to be presented (by Charles J. Jenkins, since Sherwood was, at the time, an outsider in Georgia Baptist circles) at the Sarepta Baptist Association meeting, held on the 21–24 October 1820 at Van's Creek Church near Ruckersville. The text is at right. The underlined portion was an insertion by Jenkins. Sherwood's original text read simply "to sister associations in this State." Sherwood was assisted the convention's formation by Jesse Mercer, who was to be the convention's first president, and who helped to write its constitution. Mercer had earlier helped to form the General Committee of Georgia Baptists, in 1803, and the Powelton Conferences at the turn of the century, which had foundered over concerns that its stated goal of "the increase of union among all real Christians" indicated open communion, and possible union of Baptists with Pedobaptists, leading to its dissolution in 1810.

to form plans for the revival of religion, to promote uniformity in sentiment, practice, and discipline, to augment the number of pious, intelligent, and laborious ministers, to act in unison with the Christians of other denominations on the general interests of the Redeemer's kingdom.

— "A Baptist", announcement of the purposes of the General Association

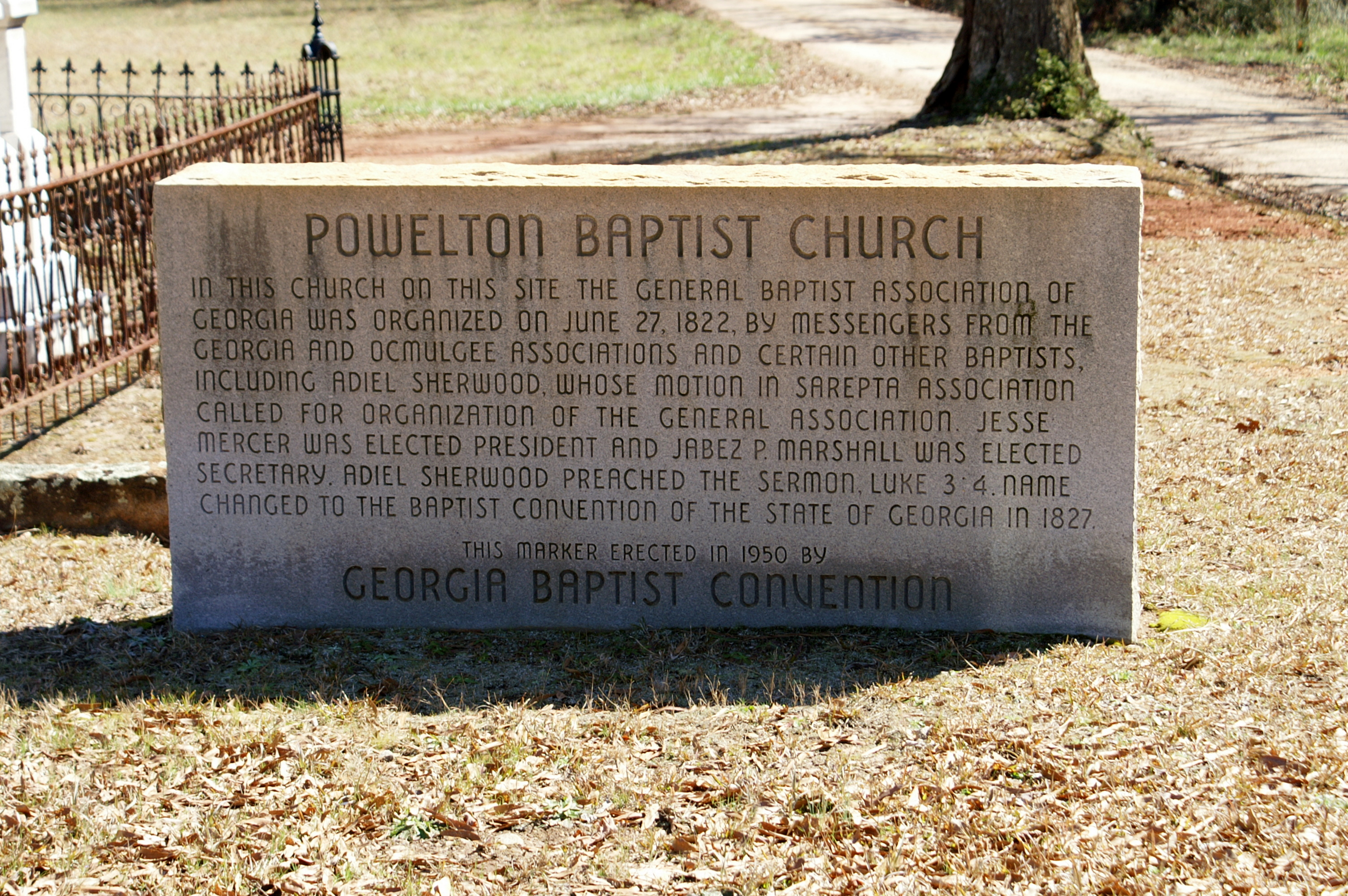
Historical marker at Powelton Baptist Church

In June 1822, delegates from the Georgia and Ocmulgee Baptist associations met at Powelton in Powelton Baptist Church and agreed upon the constitution of what was then called The General Association. In the 1823 session, the Sarepta association, which, ironically, in 1821 had reversed its position on the necessity for a state convention, and which had not sent a delegation to the 1822 meeting, sent corresponding delegates to the General Association, meeting again in Powelton. Sarepta was not to become a full member for some two decades. Delegates were also sent by the Sunbury association, which joined the General Association, meeting this time in Eatonton, in 1824; by the Yellow River association, in 1825; by Augusta (and by several auxiliary societies, which were that year, by a constitutional amendment, allowed to join) in 1826; and by the Flint River association in 1827 (when the convention met in Washington). From 1826 to 1838, twenty-six auxiliary societies sent delegations to the convention. This growth stopped when the Primitive Baptists separated from the missionary Baptists; and instead, from 1835 to 1845, the convention saw a growth in the number of Baptist associations joining it, with fourteen associations joining during that period. When the General Association met in Monticello in 1828, it resolved to change its name to the General Convention (formally: The Baptist Convention for the State of Georgia).

In April 1861, the convention met in Athens. Like other churches, conventions, and conferences, it aligned itself politically with the Confederacy.

This resolution preceded a similar resolution, passed in May the same year by the Southern Baptist Convention, meeting in Savannah, where approximately one half of the delegates were Georgians, approving of the Confederacy.

In 2015, the executive committee of the convention adopted the DBA name “Georgia Baptist Mission Board.”

== Georgia Baptist colleges ==
- Brewton-Parker College
- Shorter University
- Truett McConnell University

== Other affiliated organizations ==
- Baptist Retirement Communities of Georgia, Inc.
- Baptist Village Retirement Communities
- Camp Kaleo
- Ethics & Public Affairs
- GBC Internet Radio
- Georgia Baptist Conference Center - Toccoa
- Georgia Baptist Convention Historical Archive and Museum
- Pinnacle Conference Center
- The Christian Index
