= George Herbert Sherwood =

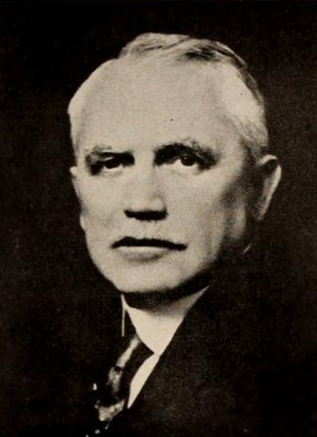

George Herbert Sherwood (28 March 1876 – 18 March 1937) was a nature educator and honorary director of the American Museum of Natural History. He was a pioneer promoter of museum outreach to schools and school teachers.

== Life and work ==
Sherwood was born in Richmond, to Benjamin Atherton and Elizabeth May Murray Sherwood. He studied at Brown University and joined the laboratory of the Federal Fish commission in Woods Hole in 1898. From 1902 to 1960 he served as an assistant curator of invertebrates at the American Museum of Natural History, serving as a treasurer from 1906 to 1911 and becoming a director in 1927. He headed the department of education at the American Museum of Natural History from 1906 and was involved in outreach to schools. He went back to Brown University where he later received a doctorate in education in 1928. The outreach activity worked with nearly 30,000,000 students over the years with lectures, film-shows and portable museum exhibits (termed as musettes). He also established classes for teacher training at the museum. He was also a president of the New York Academy of Sciences.

Sherwood believed that "training of children is the most important vocation in the world" and his work on education at the American Museum of Natural History was considered to be a pioneering one. He gave lectures and took exhibits to schools with the idea ‘to stimulate children to read good books’. There were lecture notes prepared with lantern slides to enable teachers to use the collections. He was also interested in getting city students to get a glimpse of the outdoors. He began special programs for the visually impaired as well. He was supported by Henry Fairfield Osborne from 1908 who also promoted Louis Agassiz's dictum of "Study Nature not Books."

Sherwood married Alverda Laura Brown of Providence in 1902. He was at the museum after a dinner hosting Peter Freuchen when he died of a heart attack.
