= Sherwood Forest, Frederick County, Maryland =

Unincorporated community in Maryland, USA

Coordinates: 39°23′15″N 77°14′09″W

Sherwood Forest is an unincorporated community in Frederick County, Maryland, United States.
