= Sherwood, Tennessee =

- Unincorporated community
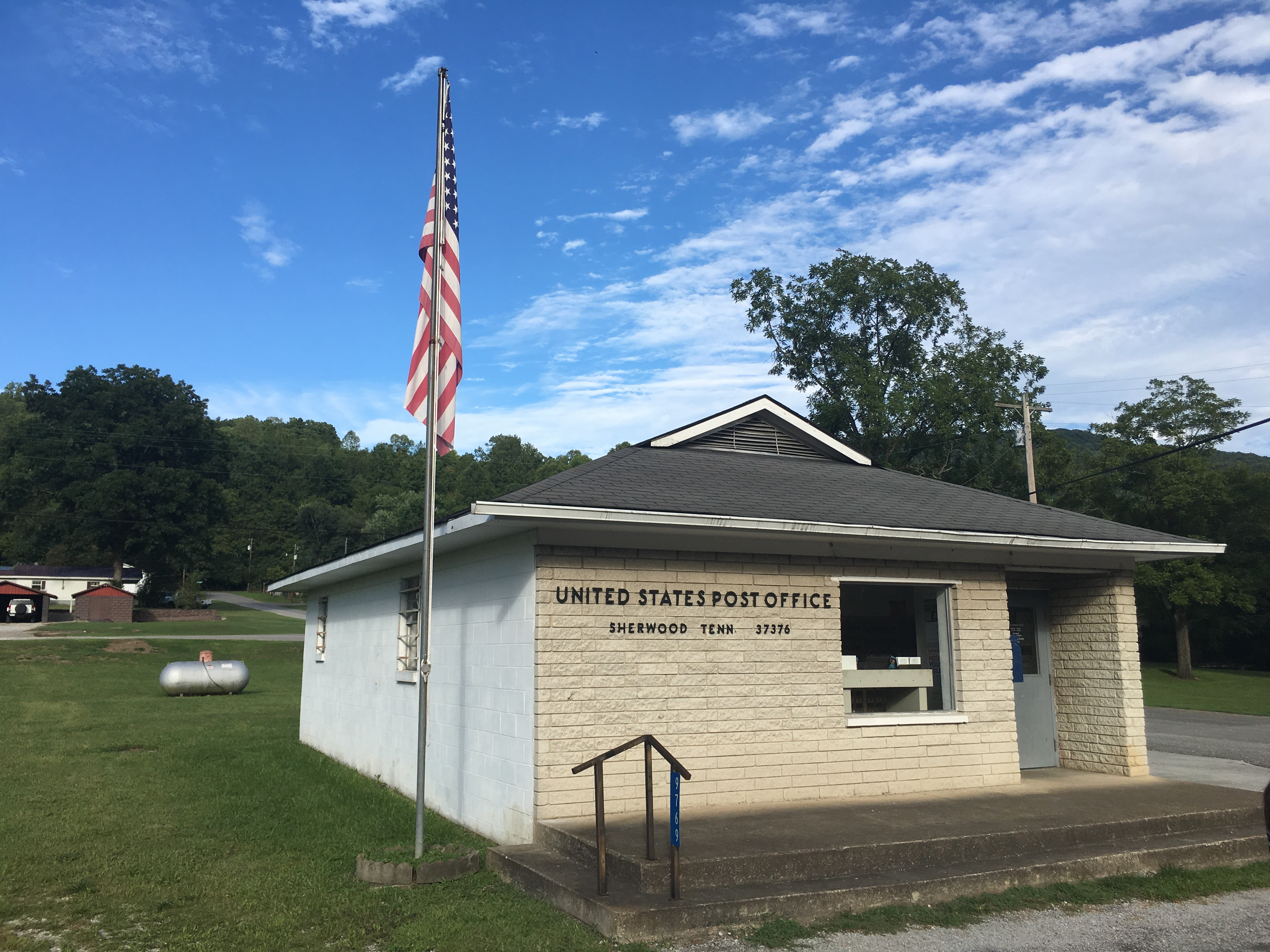
- Post office and houses

- Location within Tennessee Location within the United States
- Coordinates: 35°04′34″N 85°55′24″W
- Country: United States
- State: Tennessee
- County: Franklin

Area
  - Total: 0.91 sq mi (2.35 km^{2})
  - Land: 0.91 sq mi (2.35 km^{2})
  - Water: 0 sq mi (0.00 km^{2})
- Elevation: 669 ft (204 m)

Population (2020)
  - Total: 122
  - Density: 134.5/sq mi (51.95/km^{2})
- Time zone: UTC-6 (Central (CST))
  - Summer (DST): UTC-5 (CDT)
- ZIP code: 37376
- Area code: 931
- GNIS feature ID: 1303571

Sherwood is an unincorporated community in Franklin County, Tennessee, United States. It is located along Tennessee State Route 56 13.1 miles (21.1 km) southeast of Winchester, and just north of the Alabama state line. Sherwood has a post office with ZIP code 37376.

== Demographics ==
Historical population
Census	Pop.	Note	%±
2020	122		—
U.S. Decennial Census

== Geography and location ==
The Crow Creek Valley, in which Sherwood is situated, is a relatively narrow valley surrounded on three sides (north, east, and west) by the Cumberland Plateau (including Lost Cove), with the southern end of the valley opening toward Alabama. Crow Creek, which flows from Lost Cove Cave, drains the valley and flows through the western part of Sherwood, emptying into the Tennessee River at Guntersville Lake near Stevenson, Alabama, several miles to the south. Sherwood lies at an elevation of 669 feet (204 m).

State Route 56, the only major highway that passes through Sherwood, traverses the valley from north-to-south. To the north, the road ascends more than 1,000 feet (300 m) to Sewanee atop the Cumberland Plateau. To the south, the road continues into Alabama as State Route 117, eventually reaching Stevenson. Railroad tracks run alongside the highway for much of its stretch in the valley.

== History ==
Human habitation in the Sherwood area is very ancient as evidenced by the many thousands of Native American projectile points in the nearby fields. The town location is at the intersection of many old Native American routes which the modern trails and roads often follow. It is located on an old Stagecoach route approximately midway between Sewanee and Anderson, Alabama and is representative of the hamlets and villages that were once commonplace in the area coves and valleys.

A small community called Kitchen's Station or Catchings Station had existed as a Stagecoach stop earlier at the location. Named for station master Meridith Catchings, the small community began appearing on railroad maps after the Civil War. The town of Sherwood was named for Charles D. Sherwood, lieutenant governor of Minnesota during the Civil War. The Tennessee State Legislature approved his charter for the Tennessee Immigration and Land Company on April 15, 1878. That same day, Sherwood purchased the 1,410 acres of land for his northern colony from John F. Anderson. On June 19, 1878, a local paper announced that the name of Kitchen's [Catching's] Station would be changed to Sherwood. A number of sources have erroneously reported that Charles Sherwood was lieutenant governor of Wisconsin and that the town was established in 1875. This information probably came from the Goodspeed History Tennessee: Giles, Franklin, Lincoln, and Moore Counties. In 1989 the Sherwood Elementary School was closed and approximately 25-28 children from Sherwood, a teacher, and several aides became part of the Sewanee Public School community.

=== The Railroad ===
With the construction of the strategically important Cowan Tunnel 5 miles (8.0 km) to the north in 1852, train stops were created through the Crow Creek Valley, including at Catchings Station (Sherwood). Notably, at this station there were and continue to be pusher engines which are required to assist with train ascents up the steep mountain grade to the tunnel. Correspondingly, on the other side of the tunnel in Cowan, Tennessee, there are also pusher engines.

In 1915, a passenger train and a freight train collided in Sherwood, killing fifteen and injuring twenty-two.

=== Gager Lime Company ===
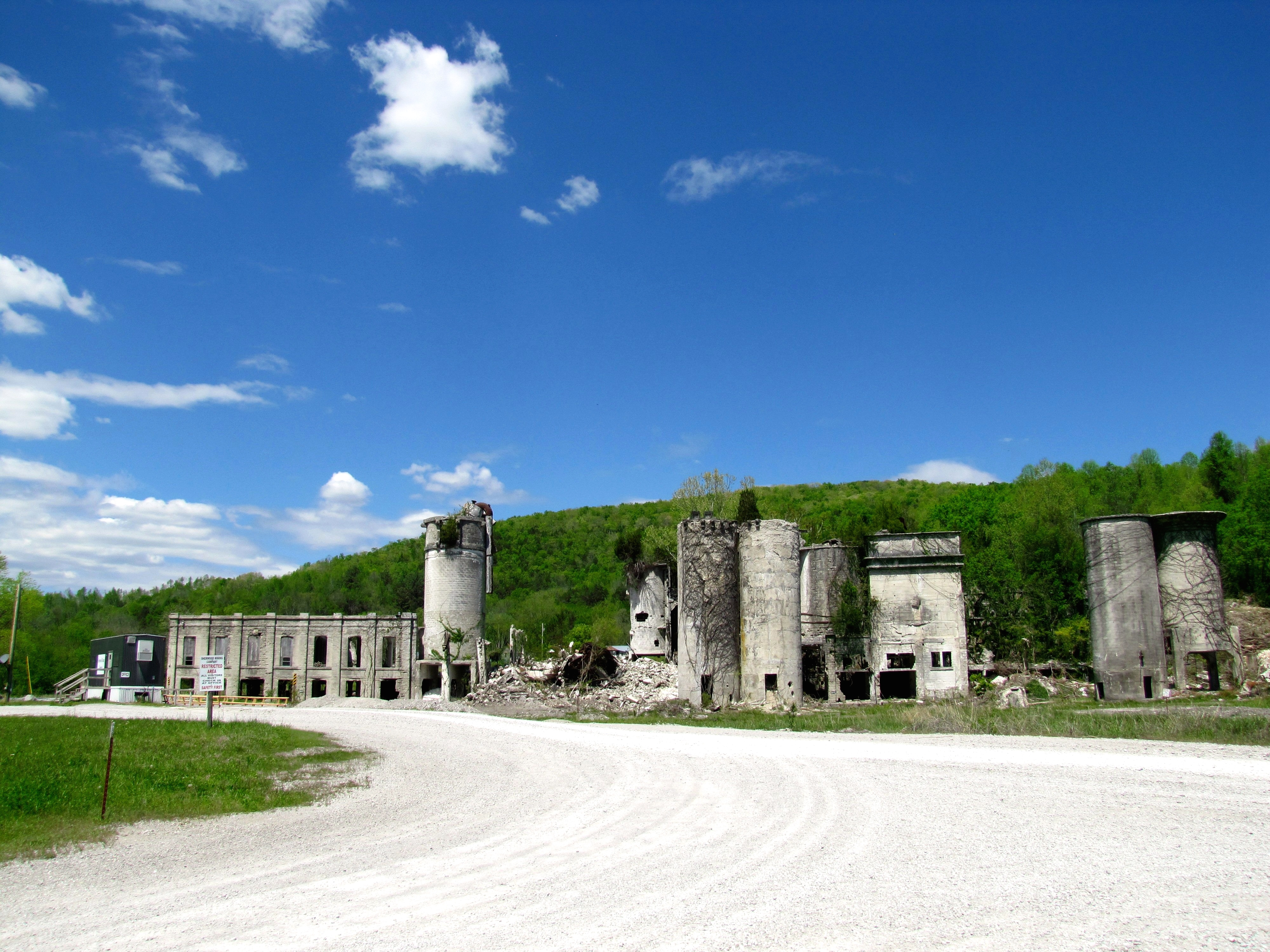
Gager Lime Manufacturing Company

The Gager Lime Manufacturing Company was established by Byron Gager in 1892 and operated a limestone quarry and lime kilns in the community. The lime production facilities operated until 1949.

As of the 1930 census, Sherwood had 1,700 residents, but the community's population declined to 900 in the 1950s as its economy stalled after the closing of the limestone plant.

The castle-like ruins of the lime production facilities and silos, which are unusual for their Egyptian Revival and Gothic Revival styling, remain in the community. The Tennessee Preservation Trust included them on its Ten in Tennessee Endangered Properties List for 2002–2003, citing their architectural distinctiveness and expressing concern that a "continued lack of maintenance" threatened their survival.

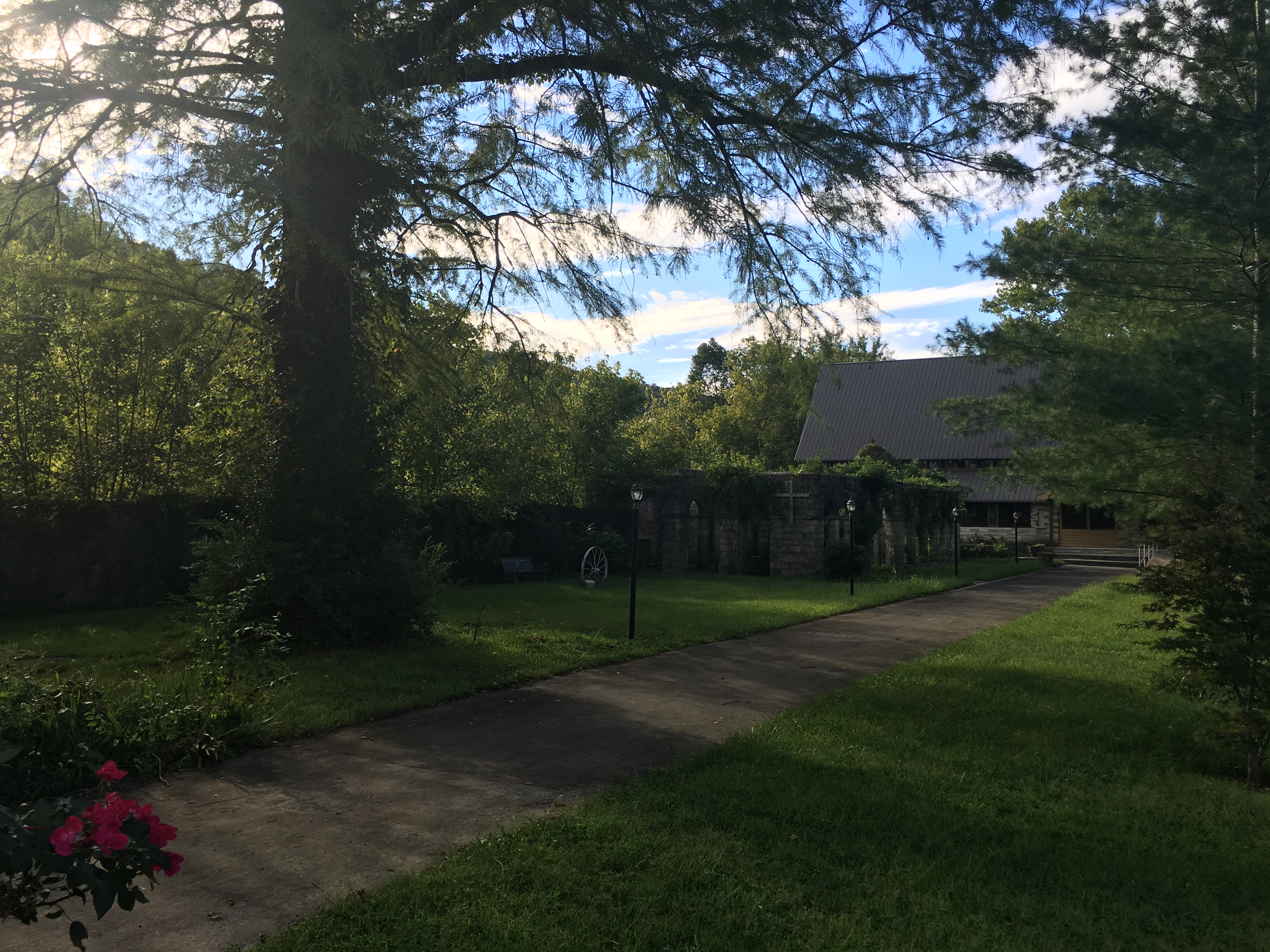
Epiphany Mission

=== Epiphany Mission ===
In 1899, the Epiphany Episcopal Mission was established in Sherwood after the Episcopal church began to provide schooling for local children. The church structure was built in 1902, replaced in 1928, burned in 1960, and then rebuilt in 1967. The 1928 structure is maintained as a partial ruin on the grounds of the modern structure. During the Great Depression, the Episcopal priest Father George Jones began a publishing a series of pamphlets to raise funds and awareness of the impoverished community; these pamphlets were later republished in 1954 as book entitled Candles in the Dark Boreen.

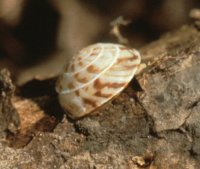
Snake-coiled forest snail

In 1956, the mission helped train a group of women and opened a shirt factory in Sherwood in an attempt to create local jobs.

== Threatened snail species ==
The painted snake-coiled forest snail is only found in the Sherwood area. The snail was first found in the area in 1906 and was designated as a threatened species in 1978. Anguispira picta has the common names of painted snake-coiled forest snail and painted tigersnail and is a rare species of air-breathing land snail, a terrestrial pulmonate gastropod mollusk in the family Discidae, the disc snails.

== Gallery ==
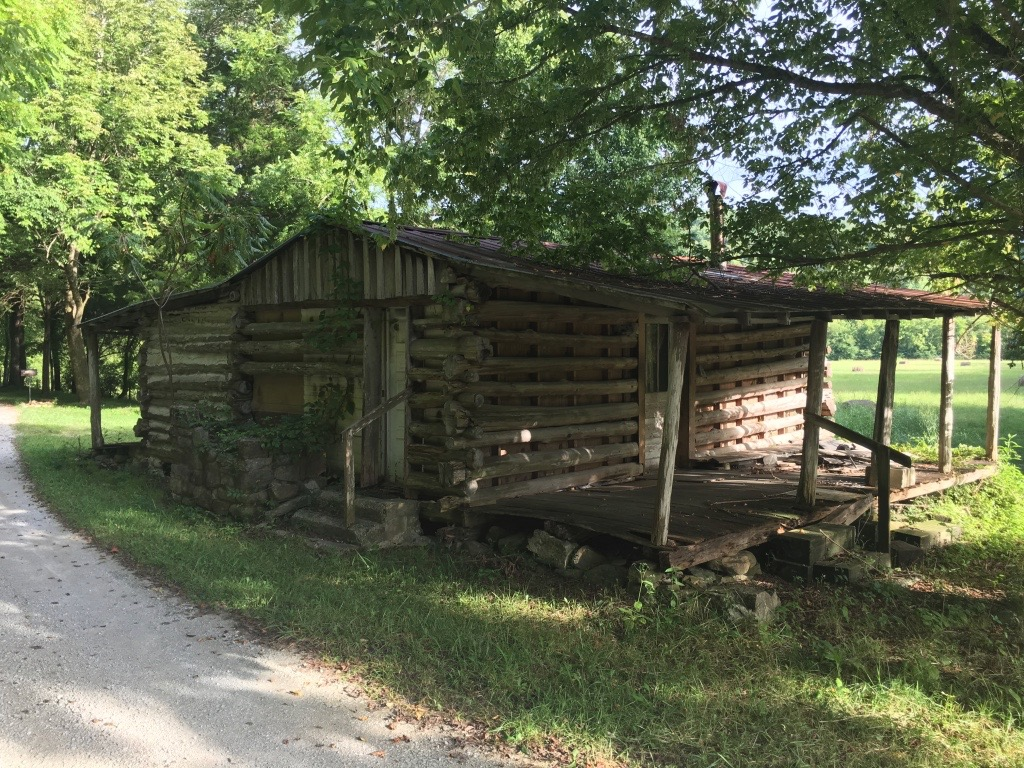
Old Log Cabin

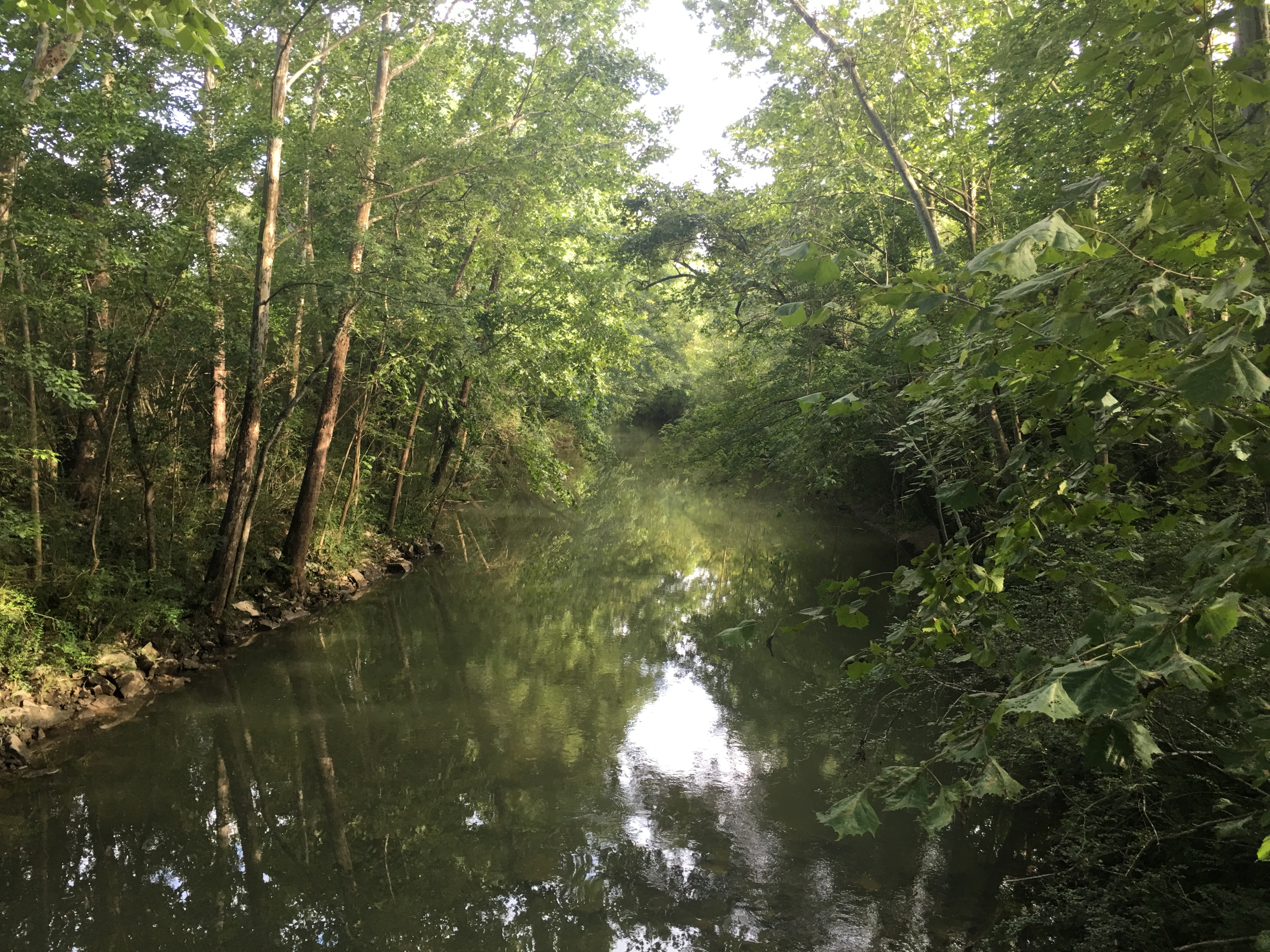
Crow Creek

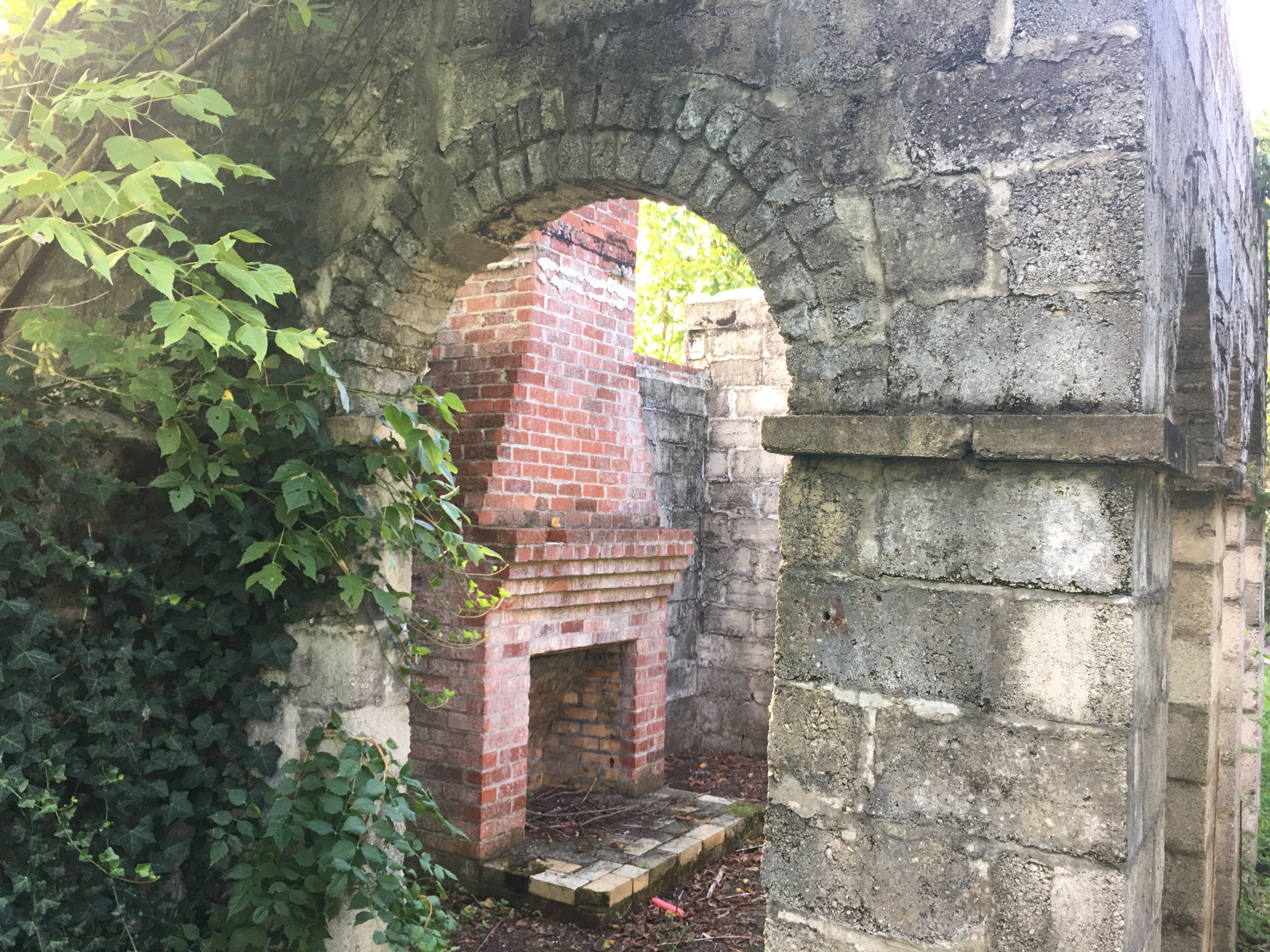
Epiphany Mission Ruined Fireplace

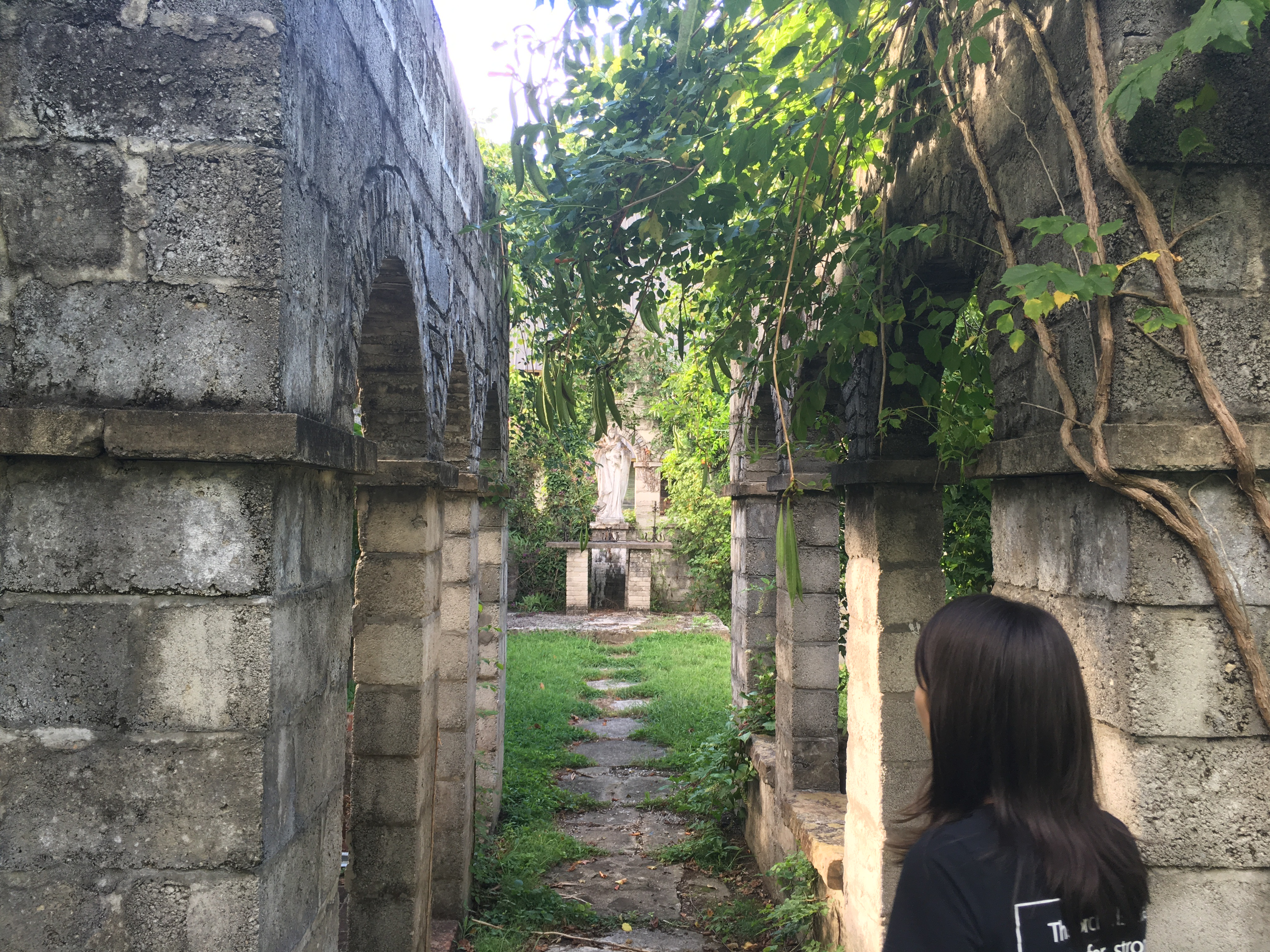
Epiphany Mission Central Ruin

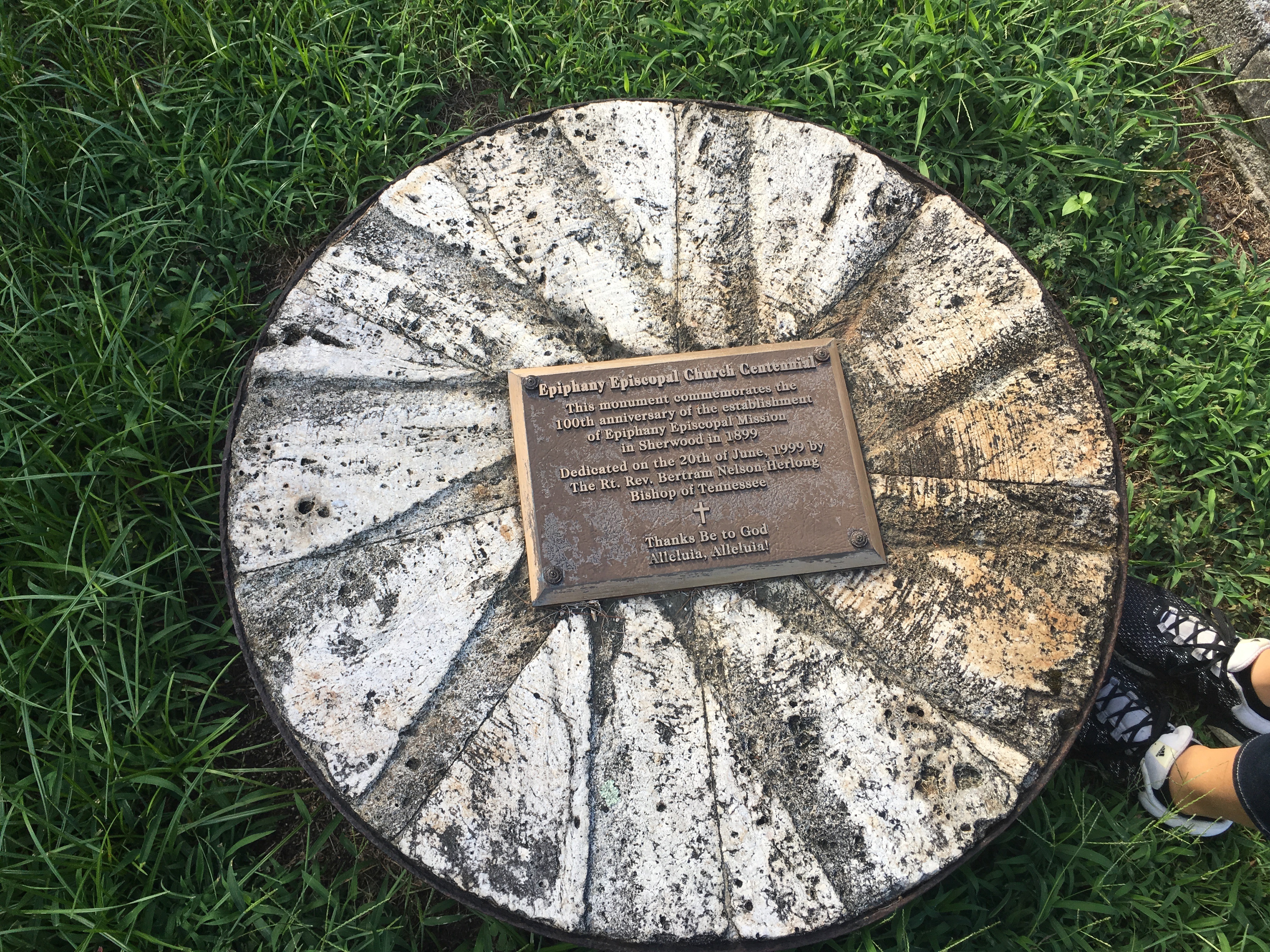
Epiphany Mission Historical Plaque

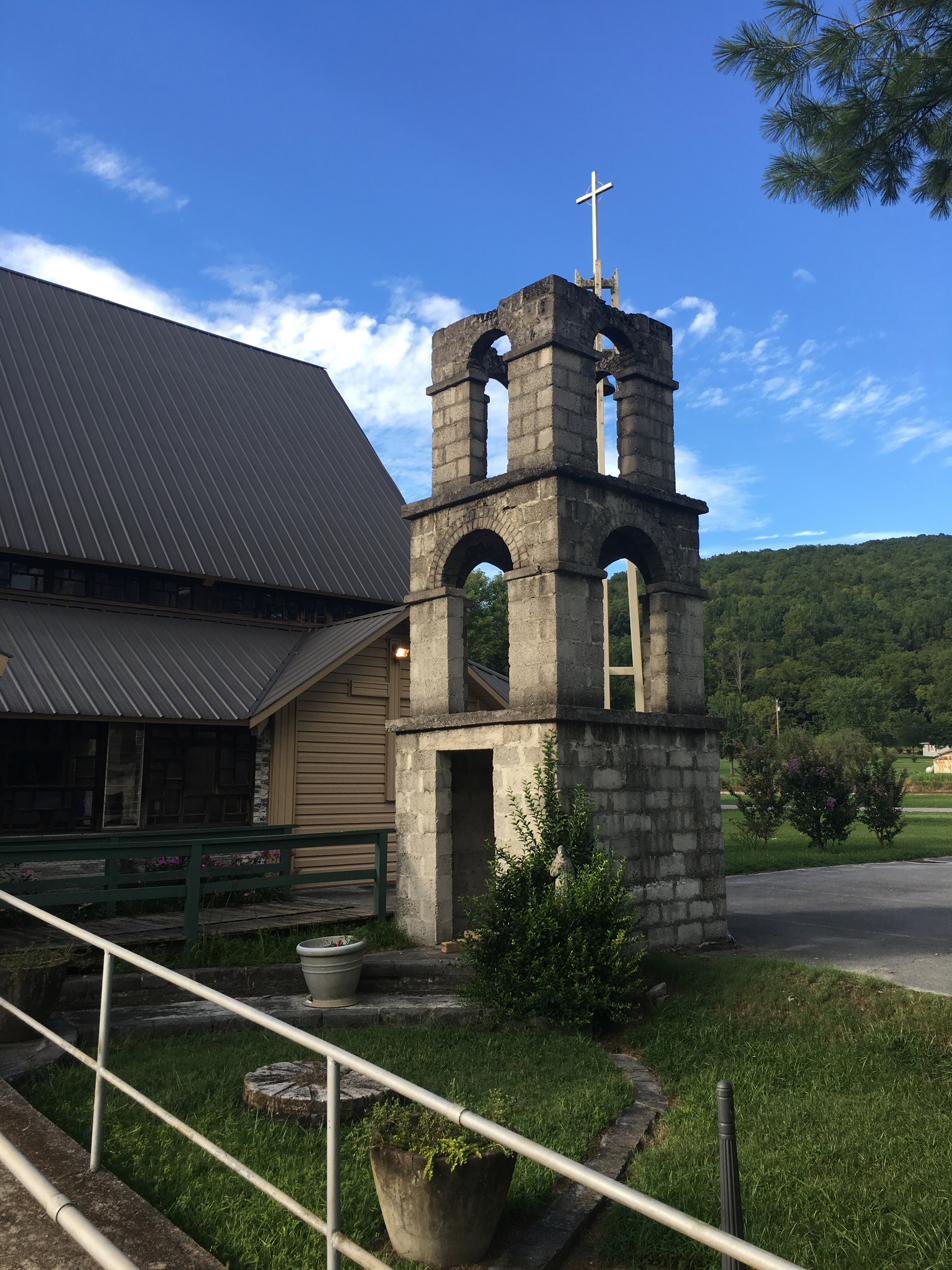
Epiphany Mission Old Bell Tower

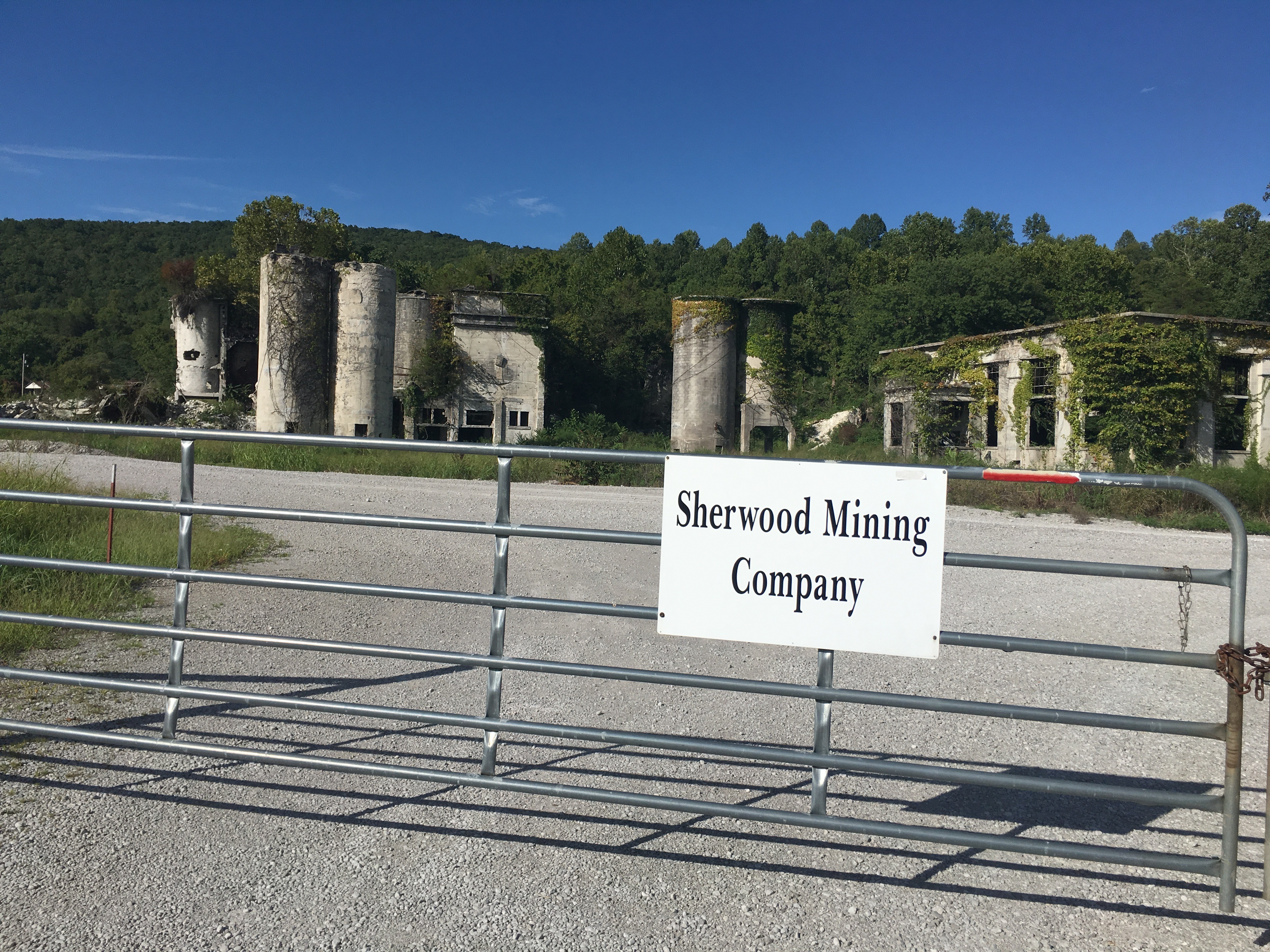
Gager Mining Company Ruins Entrance

== Notable person ==
- Scott DesJarlais – U.S. representative
