= Samuel Sherwood =

Samuel Sherwood may refer to:

- Samuel Sherwood (New York politician), American Congressman
- Samuel Sherwood (Canadian politician), Canadian lawyer and member of the legislative assemblies of Upper and Lower Canada
- Samuel B. Sherwood, U.S. Representative from Connecticut
- Samuel Sherwood (high constable), chief constable of Toronto
