= Lost Cove, Tennessee =

Valley in Tennessee, United States

Coordinates: 35.131°N 85.905°W

Lost Cove
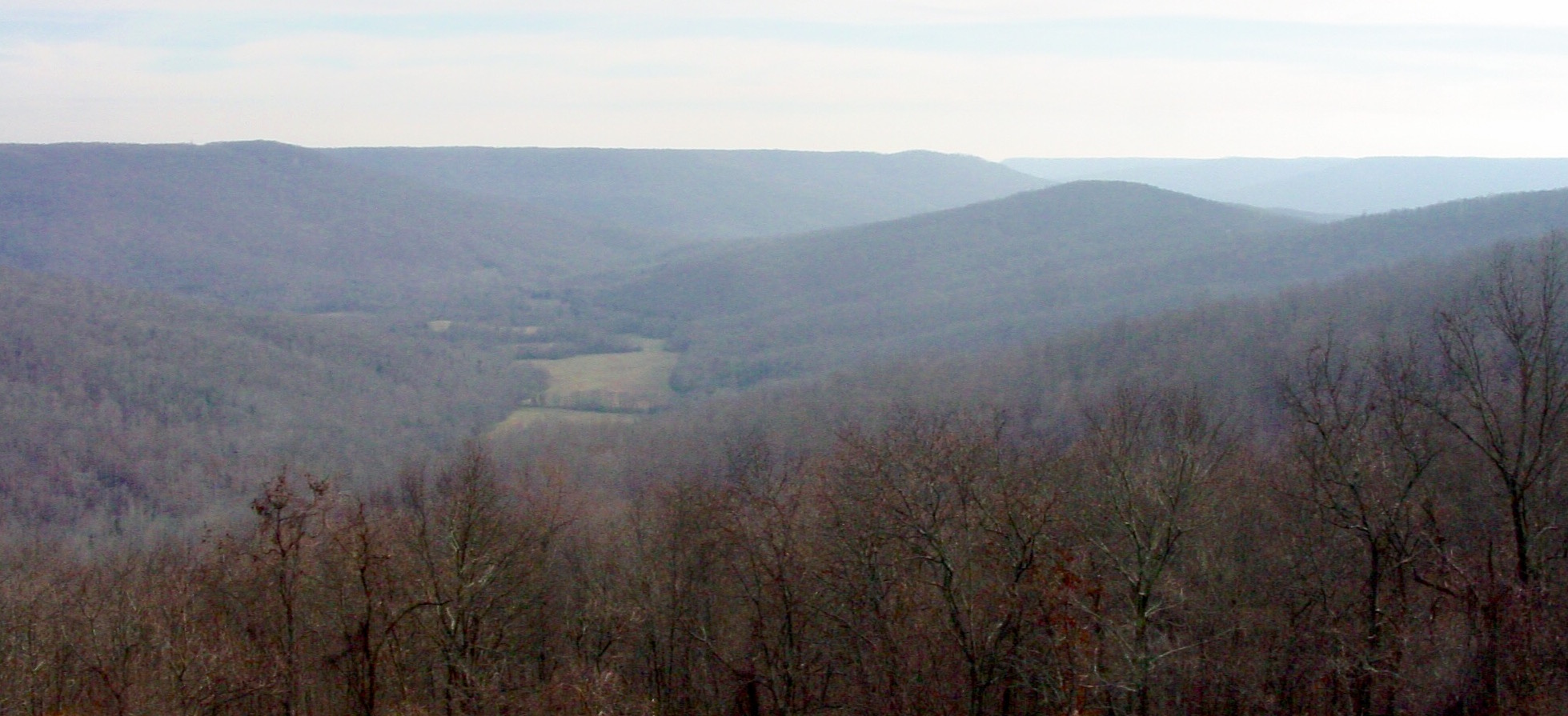
- Upper Lost Cove from Sewanee, Tennessee. The Saddle is in the distance above Lost Cove Cave
- Floor elevation: 1,000 feet (300 m)
- Length: 7 miles (11 km) North to South
- Width: 1 mile (1.6 km)

Geography
- Location: Franklin County, Tennessee
- Population centers: Sherwood, Sewanee
- Traversed by: Tennessee State Route 56
- Interactive map of Lost Cove

Lost Cove is a small valley in southern Tennessee near the Alabama border. It is noted for its history including Native American and Appalachian Settlements as well as its natural formations including Caves and Sinkholes.

== Origin of the name ==
Originally known as Lost Creek Cove in the early 19th century, referring to the small river Lost Creek that flows through it; over time the name became shortened to its present form of Lost Cove. Lost Creek was so named as it appears in the northern end of the valley below Sewanee, Tennessee and then disappears (or is lost) in the southern end into the Big Sink. An alternative origin of the name has been given as by a visitor in the mid 19th century who, becoming lost among the common Canebrakes for two days, named it as the Lost Cove.

== Geography ==
Lost Cove was formed by Karst erosion common around the Cumberland Plateau. Its total length from Sewanee to the Crow Creek Valley in Sherwood, Tennessee is approximately 7 miles (11 km). At a partially eroded ridge resembling a Saddle, the cove is divided at the Big Sink and Lost Cove Cave into northern and southern sections. The northern section is relatively isolated by the mountain to the north, west, and east and the Saddle to the south, with its inhabitants having to make the trek up over these natural obstacles to reach the neighboring towns; this led to a relatively self-sustaining way of life. The southern section is more accessible as it opens to the town of Sherwood.

== History ==
Lost Cove had been settled by Native Americans prior to the arrival of European Settlers. The latter built houses, barns, sawmills, a church, a school, cemeteries, and other structures, of which only a few remain. Evidence of Native American activity has been found at the so-called Indian Room in Lost Cove Cave.

== In Literature and Legend ==
In his book Lost Cove, George Spain recounts the five generation history of a family who lived in the Cove, largely isolated from the outside world.

The late University of the South historiographer Arthur Ben Chitty, in his book Sewanee Sampler, tells of the possibly apocryphal story of the purchase of the 18,000 acre cove from the local inhabitants by speculators; the speculators, noticing that cove was enclosed, envisioned converting it into a lake not knowing that the many sinkholes and caves would make that impractical. They were later compelled to sell back the cove to the locals at a considerable loss.

Novelist Walker Percy makes frequent mention of Lost Cove throughout his writings, including Lost in the Cosmos and Love in the Ruins.

== Gallery ==
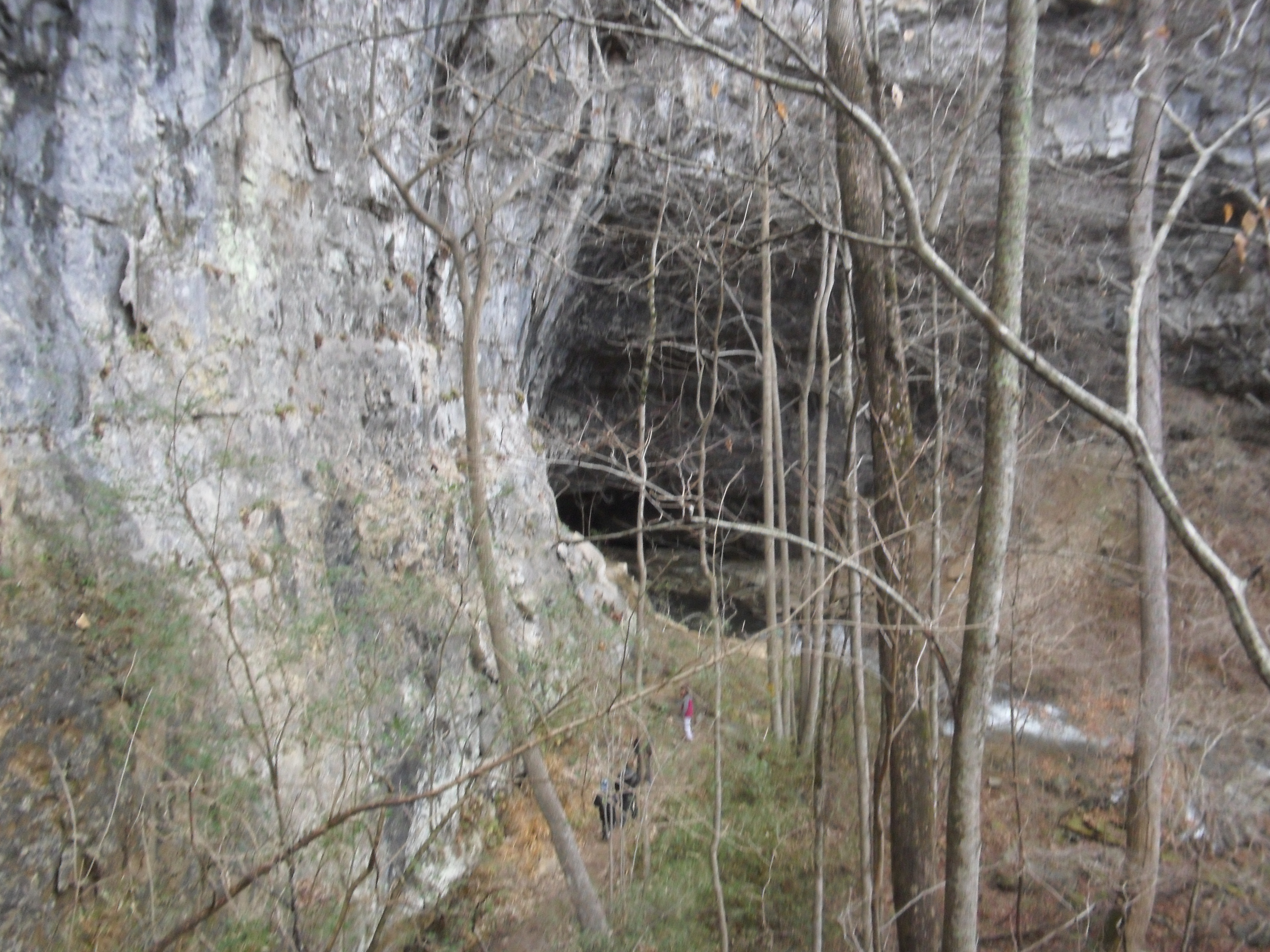
Lost Cove Cave From Cliff

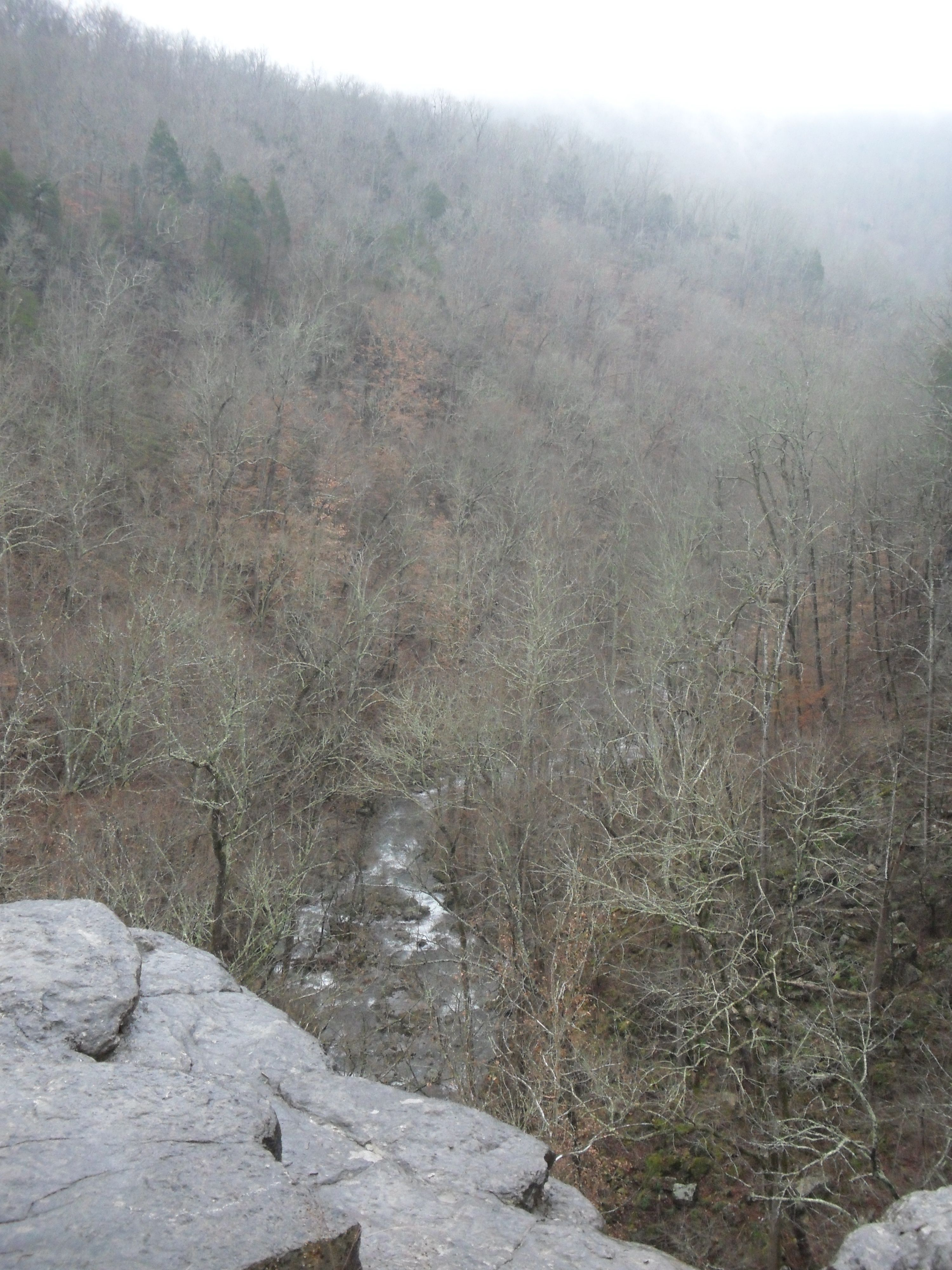
Looking south towards Crow Creek Valley from above Lost Cove Cave

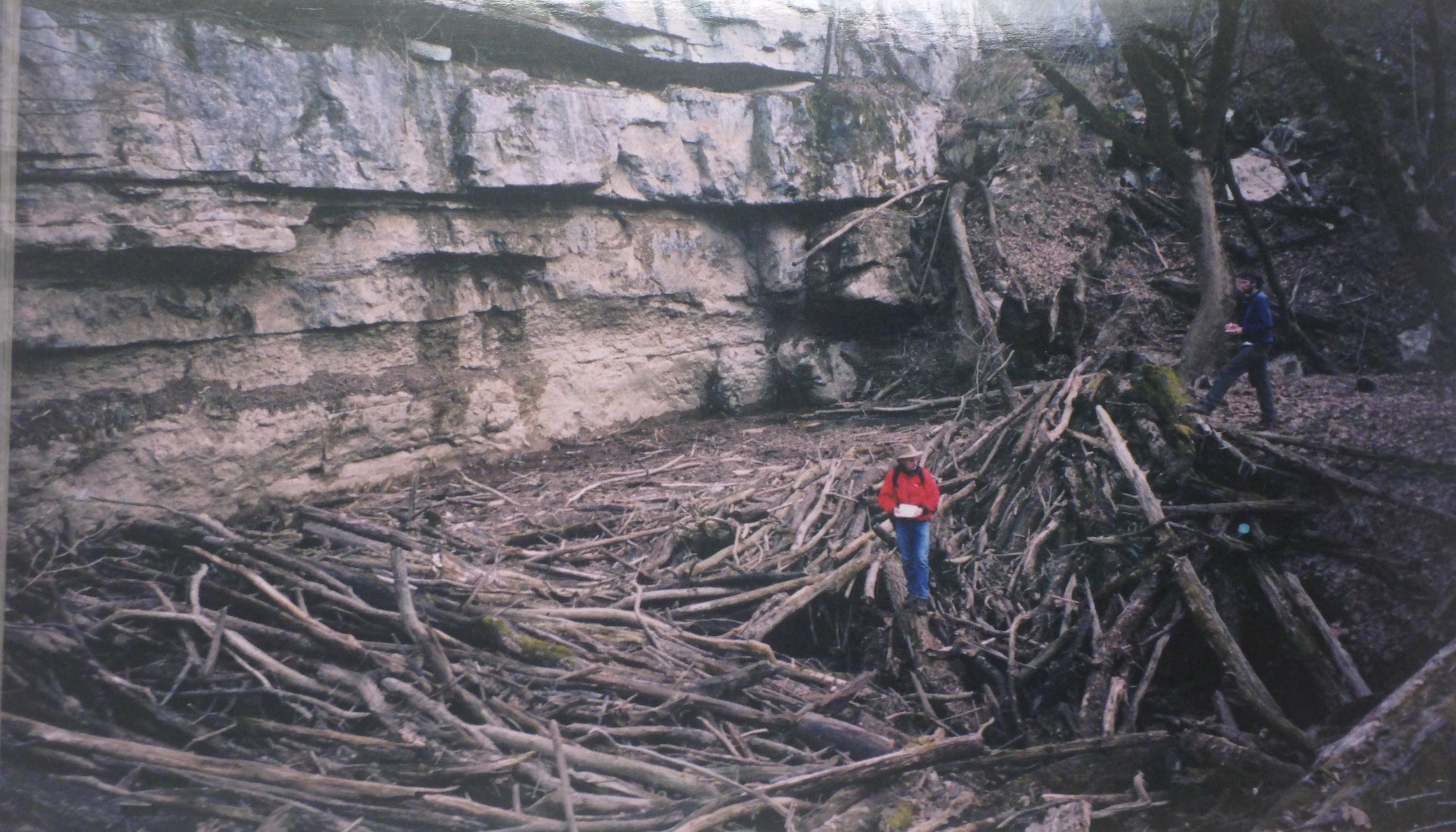
Big Sink in Lost Cove

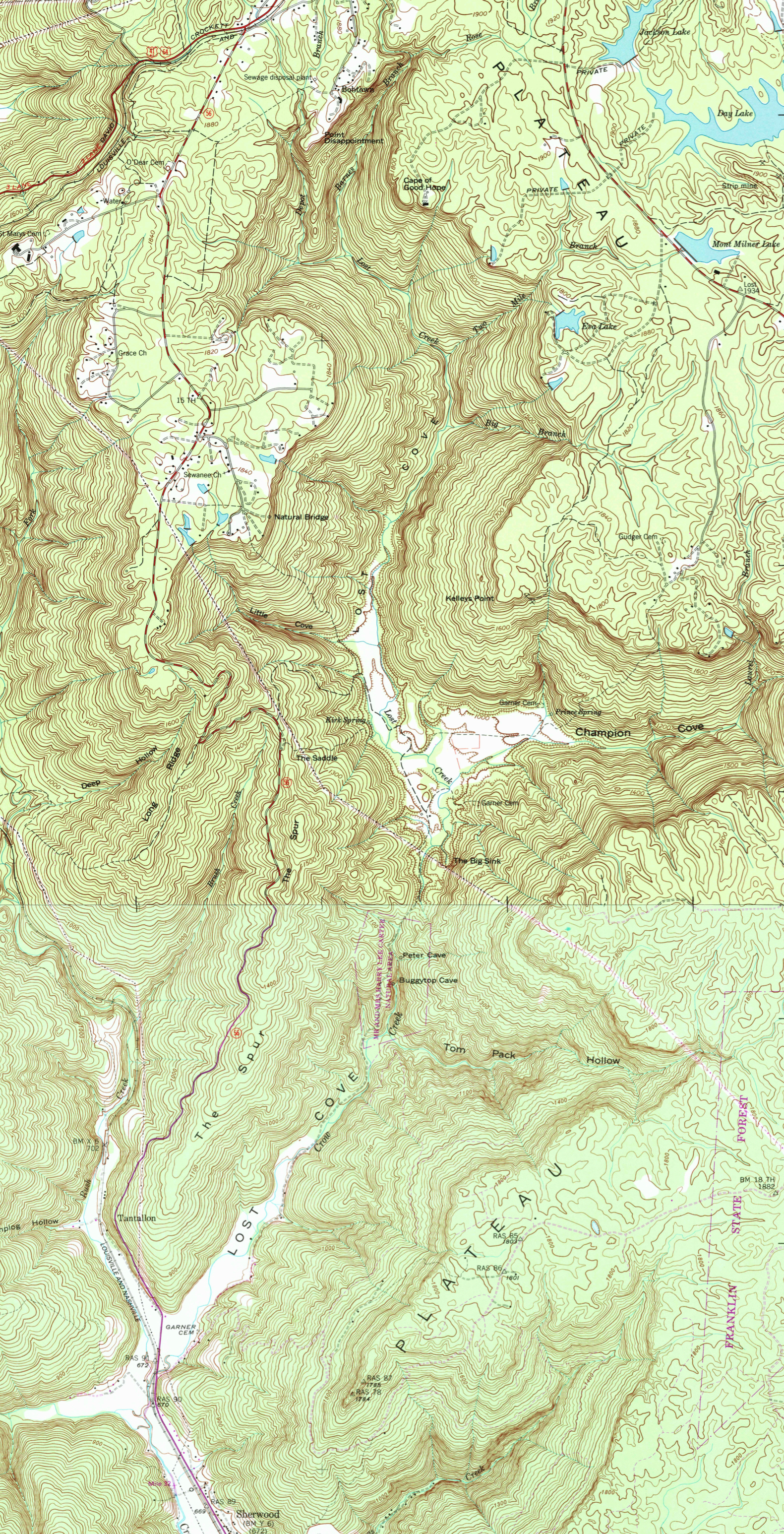
USGS Map of Lost Cove

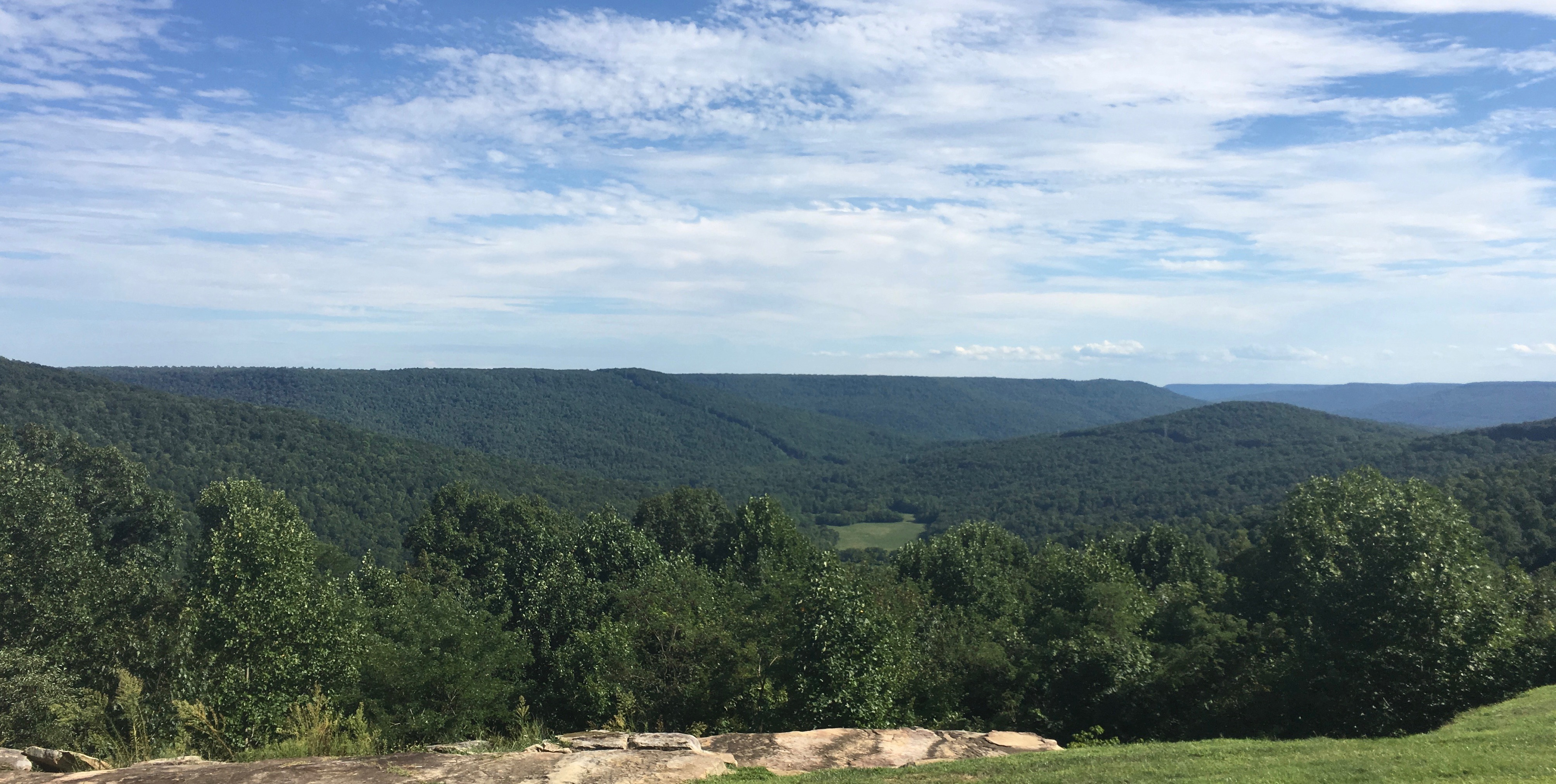
Northern Section of the Cove from the end of Rattlesnake Spring Road in Summer. In the distance is northern Alabama
