= Sherwood Forest, Montgomery County, Maryland =

Unincorporated community in Maryland, U.S.

Coordinates: 39°04′43″N 77°00′45″W

Sherwood Forest is an unincorporated community in Montgomery County, Maryland, United States. It is roughly bounded by Randolph Road, Sherwood Forest Drive, Notley Road, the Intercounty Connector, and Northwest Branch Park.

== History ==
The land was originally a 311.75-acre (126 ha) tract of land called Two Farms. Later called Westover, Evan Thomas inherited the land from his father, Samuel Thomas, in 1783. Evan Thomas leased the land to Thomas Brown for 72 pounds per year. A house was built on the land in 1810, which still stands today across from Robin Hood Swim Club. The house was built with one-foot-thick brick walls with ox blood-based mortar. It has remnants of slave quarters and an icehouse, Occupants drank water from a spring that was located where the Robin Hood Swim Club's pool is now. The water was filtered through a sand-filled channel called a race, pumped to the house with a hydraulic ram, and stored in a 40-foot-tall wood tower.

Evan Thomas sold the land to William Culver in 1816. Brothers John and Romulus Culver inherited the property when their father died in 1824. Then living in Kentucky, John Culver had no interest in the land and sold his portion of the land to Francis Valdenar in 1824; Romulus Culver later sold his portion to Valdenar in 1833.

Valdenar was a farmer and a Commissioner of Montgomery County. When Montgomery County and Prince George's County disputed their border, Valdenar helped define the boundary separating the two counties.

Valdenar mortgaged the property in 1870. When Valdenar could not meet the mortgage payments, the property was sold at a public auction to Henry and Mary Bradley in 1876, and they gave it to their son William Bradley later that year.

A successful farmer, William Bradley built an elaborate Queen Anne-style addition to the house. William Bradley died in 1897, and John Bliler bought the property from Bradley's widow Mary Bradley by way of a mortgage in 1926. Bliler defaulted on the mortgage, and Mary Bradley bought back the property at a public auction in 1929.

Mary Bradley sold the property to a developer in 1950, but she inserted a clause in the deed stating that she could continue to live in the house for free for the rest of her life. The deed also stated that she had the right to chop firewood on the land and she could walk her dogs on the land whenever she liked. Further, the deed stated that if the developer were to sell the portion of the land surrounding the house, she would receive half the proceeds of the sale.

The house has been listed on the Montgomery County Master Plan for Historic Preservation.

Sherwood Forest was developed by Kahn Construction Corporation. Homes were originally intended to be built in 1959, but homes were delayed until a water and sewage system was built in 1961. Homes were originally priced between $28,000 and $45,000 each. Better Homes and Gardens named one of the model homes a 1959 House of Ideas. Kahn intended the homes to be of better quality than typical homes, in order to provide long-term savings on maintenance costs to homeowners.

== Amenity ==
Robin Hood Swim Club is located in Sherwood Forest.
