= Robert Edmund Sherwood =

Robert Edmund Sherwood (1864–1946) was an American circus clown and writer. Sherwood worked in circuses during the period of the late 19th and early 20th centuries and wrote two popular circus memoirs: Here We are Again: Recollections of an Old Circus Clown (1926) and Hold Yer Hosses! The Elephants are Coming! (1932).

== Personal life ==
In 1902, Sherwood purchased a house in Prospect Park South, Flatbush, Brooklyn at 203 Marlborough Road. In 1907, Sherwood, known in the neighborhood as "Uncle Bob", created an annual Lollipop Tree festival in Flatbush. The Lollipop Tree festival consisted of Uncle Bob hiding lollipops in hollow trees for local children. Sherwood donated his large collection of circus memorabilia to the Henry Ford Museum in Greenfield, Michigan.

== Bibliography ==
- The Slang Slycopaedia of Baseball: An Exhaustive Work on Spiels and Wheezes .. (1914)
- Charles Chaplin's Funny Sayings (1915; co-authored with Charlie Chaplin)
- Here We are Again: Recollections of an Old Circus Clown (1926)
- The L-A-U-G-H book (1927)
- Rambles, a real test of memory : questions every person should be able to answer correctly (co-authored with Karl K. Kitchen and Calder Johnson)
- Hold Everything! (1929)
- Hold Yer Hosses! The Elephants are Coming! (1932)
