= Thomas Adiel Sherwood (judge) =

American judge (1834–1918)

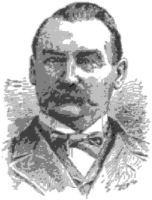

Justice of the Supreme Court of Missouri
- In office 1873–1902

Personal details
- Born: June 2, 1834; Eatonton, Georgia
- Died: November 22, 1918 (aged 84); Long Beach, California
- Parent: Adiel Sherwood (father)
- Education: Mercer University; Shurtleff College; Cincinnati Law School
- Occupation: Jurist

Thomas Adiel Sherwood (June 2, 1834 – November 22, 1918) was a justice of the Missouri Supreme Court from 1873 to 1902.

== Biography ==
Born in Eatonton, Georgia, he was the son of the Reverend Adiel Sherwood. His family claimed to come from an old English ancestry, originating in Nottinghamshire, Sherwood Forest, England, and leaving England for Connecticut in the late 1600s, but in 1951 the genealogist Donald Lines Jacobus pointed out that no historical evidence exists for this claim. Sherwood attended Mercer University in Georgia, and then Shurtleff College. He graduated from Cincinnati Law School in 1857 and was admitted to the bar in Missouri the same year. He commenced the practice of law at Springfield, Mo., in 1864, and soon entered into an extensive practice in the circuit courts as well as in the supreme court.

Sherwood was elected to the supreme court in 1872, for a term or ten years, under an amendment of the constitution adopted in 1865. The term of supreme judges had previously been for six years, but under the amendment, the number of judges was increased from three to five, and the terms were extended to ten years. At his election in 1872 Judge Sherwood received the highest vote of the five persons in nomination, he was elected for ten years, while others were elected for shorter terms. Sherwood was also named chief justice, because he was the oldest in commission at the time the act went into force. He ceased to be the oldest in commission on January 1, 1883, when Judge Warwick Hough became chief justice. Sherwood was twice reelected to the court, in 1882 and 1892.

Sherwood died in Long Beach, California, where he had lived in retirement for several years.

Political offices
Preceded by Newly constituted court	Justice of the Missouri Supreme Court; 1873–1902	Succeeded by James David Fox
