= Tennessee State Route 279 =

State highway in Tennessee, United States

State Route 279
- SR 279 highlighted in red

Route information
- Maintained by TDOT
- Length: 5.3 mi (8.5 km)
- Existed: July 1, 1983–present

Major junctions
- West end: US 41A in Estill Springs
- East end: SR 127 near Estill Springs

Location
- Country: United States
- State: Tennessee
- Counties: Franklin

Highway system
- Tennessee State Routes; Interstate; US; State
← SR 278	→ SR 280

State Route 279 (SR 279) is a 5.3-mile-long (8.5 km) east–west state highway in Franklin County, Tennessee.

== Route description ==
SR 279 begins as Spring Creek Road in Estill Springs at an intersection with US 41A/SR 16 (N Main Street) just north of downtown. It heads north through neighborhoods before making a sharp turn to the east, where it leaves Estill Springs and passes through rural farmland. The highway then becomes Morris Ferry Bridge Road, at an intersection with Beth Page Road, and passes through wooded areas to cross a bridge over the Elk River, just shortly before passing just south of the Elk River Dam. SR 279 winds its way northeast along the banks of the Woods Reservoir, where it passes by Franklin County Park, before coming to an end at an intersection with SR 127. The entire route of SR 279 is a two-lane highway.

== Major intersections ==
The entire route is in Franklin County.

Location	mi	km	Destinations	Notes
Estill Springs	0.0	0.0	US 41A (N Main Street/SR 16) – Tullahoma, Decherd	Western terminus
	2.1	3.4	Bridge over the Elk River	
	4.6	7.4	Franklin County Park Road - Franklin County Park	Access road into park
	5.3	8.5	SR 127 (Aedc Road) – Decherd, Hillsboro	Eastern terminus
1.000 mi = 1.609 km; 1.000 km = 0.621 mi
