= Tennessee House of Representatives 39th district =

State legislative district in Tennessee

Tennessee's 39th State House of Representatives district
- Map of Tennessee House districts with the 39th District shaded in red
Representative
Iris Rudder; R–Pulaski
since 2019
- Demographics: 88.4% White; 4.1% Black; 3.3% Hispanic; 0.6% Asian; 3.3% Multiracial
- Population (2024): 73,763

The Tennessee House of Representatives 39th district is one of the 99 legislative districts in the lower house of the Tennessee General Assembly. The district is located in Middle and East Tennessee and covers Franklin and Marion counties. The district includes Winchester, Estill Springs, Jasper, and South Pittsburg. It also includes Cowan, Huntland, New Hope, and outlying parts of Tullahoma and Monteagle. Notable water features of the district include Tims Ford Lake and the Tennessee River. Iris Rudder has represented the district since 2019.

== Demographics ==
The Tennessee Comptroller estimates the population as of 2024 at 73,763.

- 88.4% of the district is White
- 4.1% of the district is Black
- 3.3% of the district is Hispanic
- 0.6% of the district is Asian
- 0.2% of the district is some other race alone
- 3.3% of the district is Two or more races

Detailed demographic information is also available through Census Reporter.

== History ==
The 88th Tennessee General Assembly was the first in which all districts were numbered. At this time, the 39th district was in Franklin, Grundy, Lincoln and Moore counties. During the 93rd GA, it was composed of Bledsoe, Cumberland, Marion, Roane and Sequatchie counties. From the 94th-102nd GAs, it was composed of Franklin, Moore, and part of Marion counties. From the 103rd-107th GAs, it was composed of Franklin, Moore, and part of Lincoln counties. From the 108th-112th, it was composed of Moore, and parts of Franklin, and Marion, counties. Since the 113th General Assembly, it has been composed of Franklin and Marion counties.

== List of Representatives ==
Representative	Party	Years of Service	General Assembly	Hometown
Iris Rudder	Republican	2019-present	111th-114th	Winchester
David Alexander	Republican	2011-2018	107th-110th	Winchester
George Fraley	Democratic	1997-2010	100th-106th	Winchester
Billy Rigsby	Democratic	1995-2002	97th-99th	Cowan
Ed Murray	Democratic	1987-1994	94th-96th	Winchester
Shirley Duer	Republican	1987-1994	93rd	Crossville
Ed Murray	Democratic	1987-1994	87th-92nd	Winchester
