= Tennessee State Route 476 =

State highway in Tennessee, United States

State Route 476
- Mansford Road; Awalt Road
- TN 476 highlighted in red

Route information
- Maintained by TDOT
- Length: 11.8 mi (19.0 km)
- Existed: 2007–present

Major junctions
- South end: SR 50 in Broadview
- North end: SR 130 south of Tullahoma

Location
- Country: United States
- State: Tennessee
- Counties: Franklin

Highway system
- Tennessee State Routes; Interstate; US; State
← SR 474	→ SR 477

State Route 476 (SR 476) is a state highway in Tennessee designated in 2007, located north and west of Winchester. It was created as an access road to Tims Ford Lake, which it crosses twice, and Tims Ford State Park. The route is located entirely in Franklin County, Tennessee.

== Route description ==
SR 476 begins at SR 50 west of Winchester in the community of Broadview. It goes northwest as Mansford Road through farmland before crossing its first bridge over the Elk River/Tims Ford Lake. SR 476 then passes through Tims Ford State Park before coming to an intersection with Awalt Road', which it turns onto to cross the second bridge over Tims Ford Lake. It then continues northeasterly through rural areas before to an end at a Y-intersection with SR 130 just south of Tullahoma. The entire route of SR 476 is a rural two-lane highway.

== Major intersections ==
The entire route is in Franklin County.

Location	mi	km	Destinations	Notes
Broadview	0.0	0.0	SR 50 (Lynchburg Highway) – Lynchburg, Winchester	Southern terminus
Tims Ford State Park			Tims Ford Drive – Tims Ford State Park	Main entrance to the park
	11.8	19.0	SR 130 (Old Tullahoma Road) – Tullahoma, Winchester	Northern terminus
1.000 mi = 1.609 km; 1.000 km = 0.621 mi
