= Tennessee State Route 127 =

State highway in Tennessee, United States

State Route 127
- SR 127 highlighted in red

Route information
- Maintained by TDOT
- Length: 43.52 mi (70.04 km)

Major junctions
- South end: US 41A in Decherd
- US 41 in Hillsboro; SR 108 in Viola; SR 56 near McMinnville; SR 8 near McMinnville
- North end: SR 30 near McMinnville

Location
- Country: United States
- State: Tennessee
- Counties: Franklin, Coffee, Warren

Highway system
- Tennessee State Routes; Interstate; US; State
← US 127	→ SR 128

State Route 127 (SR 127) is a 43.52-mile-long (70.04 km) north–south state highway in Middle Tennessee. It connects Decherd with McMinnville via Hillsboro and Viola.

== Route description ==
SR 127 begins in Franklin County in Decherd at an intersection with US 41A/SR 16 at the northern edge of town. It goes northeast through farmland to have an intersection with SR 279 before crossing the Woods Reservoir/Elk River and entering Coffee County shortly thereafter. The highway then passes through wooded areas, where it passes by Arnold Air Force Base, before crossing over I-24, without an interchange, and entering Hillsboro. SR 127 then passes by several homes and businesses before having an intersection with US 41/SR 2. It then leaves Hillsboro and continues northeast through farmland and rural areas along the western edge of the Cumberland Plateau for several miles before crossing into Warren County. The highway continues northeast through rural areas to enter Viola and become concurrent with SR 108 at the southern edge of town. SR 108/SR 127 wind their way through town before leaving Viola and continuing north to have an intersection with SR 287. They then curve to the northeast and come to the southern outskirts of McMinnville, where SR 108 breaks off and continues north into the city while SR 127 continues northeast. The highway continues along the edge of the Plateau as it has intersections with both SR 56 and SR 8, both within less than 1/2 mile (0.80 km) of each other. SR 127 then curves to the north again to pass through Shellsford and cross a bridge over the Collins River, continuing through farmland and rural areas before coming to an end at an intersection with SR 30, just approximately 1,300 feet (400 m) east of US 70S. The entire route of SR 127 is a rural two-lane highway.

== Major intersections ==
County	Location	mi	km	Destinations	Notes
Franklin	Decherd	0.0	0.0	US 41A (Decherd Boulevard/SR 16) – Estill Springs, Winchester	Southern terminus
Franklin				SR 279 west (Morris Ferry Bridge Road) – Estill Springs	Eastern terminus of SR 279; provides access to Franklin County Park and Elk River Dam
Franklin				Bridge over the Woods Reservoir/Elk River	
Coffee				Decherd Highway - Arnold Air Force Base	Access road into base
Coffee	Hillsboro			Bridge over I-24	
Coffee	Hillsboro			US 41 (Hillsboro Highway/SR 2) – Manchester, Monteagle	
Warren	Viola			SR 108 south (Viola Road) – Altamont	Southern end of SR 108 concurrency
Warren				SR 287 north (Morrison-Viola Road) – Morrison	Southern terminus of SR 287
Warren				SR 108 north (Viola Road) – McMinnville	Northern end of SR 108 concurrency
Warren				SR 56 (Beersheba Highway) – McMinnville, Beersheba Springs	
Warren				SR 8 (Harrison Ferry Road) – McMinnville, Dunlap	
Warren				Bridge over the Collins River	
Warren		43.52	70.04	SR 30 (Spencer Road) to US 70S – McMinnville, Spencer	Northern terminus
1.000 mi = 1.609 km; 1.000 km = 0.621 mi: Concurrency terminus
