= Tennessee State Route 130 =

State highway in Tennessee, United States

State Route 130
- SR 130 highlighted in red

Route information
- Maintained by TDOT
- Length: 51.3 mi (82.6 km)

Major junctions
- West end: US 431 / SR 129 in Petersburg
- SR 64 near Shelbyville; US 231 / SR 82 in Shelbyville; US 41A / SR 55 in Tullahoma
- East end: US 64 Bus. / SR 50 in Winchester

Location
- Country: United States
- State: Tennessee
- Counties: Marshall, Lincoln, Bedford, Moore, Coffee, Franklin

Highway system
- Tennessee State Routes; Interstate; US; State
← SR 129	→ SR 131

State Route 130 (SR 130) is a 51.3-mile-long (82.6 km) east–west state highway in Middle Tennessee.

== Route description ==
SR 130 begins Marshall County in Petersburg at an intersection with US 431/SR 50/SR 129. SR 130 goes east into downtown, concurrent with SR 129, along Railroad Street to an intersection with N High Street along the Lincoln County line, where SR 130 splits off from heads north, in Marshall County. It leaves Petersburg and continues north through farmland and rural areas to cross into Bedford County. The highway then curves to the northeast and becomes concurrent with SR 64 just prior to entering Shelbyville. SR 64/SR 130 run parallel to the Duck River as they pass through neighborhoods before coming to an intersection with US 231/SR 10 (S Cannon Boulevard), whey they become concurrent with them as the highway heads north past businesses before crossing the Duck River into downtown. They almost immediately come to an intersection with Lane Parkway (SR 387), were SR 64/SR 130 split from US 231/SR 10 and follows Lane Parkway east. SR 64/SR 130 then comes to an intersection with SR 82 (N Main Street) just north of the Bedford County Courthouse, which they become concurrent with, and head east along E Lane Street before turning south along N Jefferson Street. They then come to an intersection with Depot Street, where SR 64/SR 130 split from SR 82 and head east. SR 130 then finally splits off from SR 64 and heads southeast along Belmont Avenue through neighborhoods before the Duck River for the final time to leave Shelbyville and pass through Farmland. It has an intersection with SR 276 in the Raus community before passing through the northern part of Moore County, which is primarily all wooded areas, before crossing into Coffee County and entering Tullahoma. It enters the city along Old Shelbyville Highway and passes just south Tullahoma Regional Airport before turning east along SR 55 (Wilson Avenue). They pass through neighborhoods before entering downtown and becoming concurrent US 41A/SR 16 (N Jackson Street). They head south through downtown before coming to an intersection with W Carroll Street, where SR 130 splits off and goes west along W Carroll Street and Clement Drive before turning south along Westside Drive to cross into Franklin County. SR 130 heads south through neighborhoods before leaving Tullahoma and turning southeast through farmland. It intersects SR 476 before running along the banks of Tims Ford Lake for several miles. It passes through the community of Winchester Springs before crossing a bridge over the lake (which is the Elk River) to enter Winchester. It passes southeast through neighborhoods as Old Tullahoma Road and Phillip Fulmer Parkway to cross another bridge over the lake and become N High Street. SR 130 continues through more neighborhoods before entering downtown. It formerly came to an end at an intersection with SR 50 (2nd Avenue NW). However, SR 50 was shifted to a different alignment on the west side of Winchester, and SR 130 was extended southward by one block to the currency of U.S. 64 Business/SR 15/SR 16/SR 50.

== Major intersections ==
County	Location	mi	km	Destinations	Notes
Marshall	Petersburg	0.0	0.0	US 431 / SR 129 west (Buchanan Street/SR 50) – Lewisburg, Cornersville, Fayetteville	Western terminus; western end of SR 129 concurrency
Marshall–Lincoln county line	Petersburg			SR 129 east (Railroad Street) – Lynchburg	Eastern end of SR 129 concurrency
Bedford				SR 64 west – Lewisburg	Western end of SR 64 concurrency
Bedford	Shelbyville			US 231 south (S Cannon Boulevard/SR 10 south) – Fayetteville	Western end of US 231/SR 10 concurrency
Bedford	Shelbyville			Bedford Veterans Memorial Bridge over the Duck River	
Bedford	Shelbyville			US 231 north (Lane Parkway/SR 387 north) – Murfreesboro US 231 Bus. north (N Cannon Boulevard/SR 10 north)	Southern of both SR 387 and US 231 Business; eastern end of US 231/SR 10 concurrency
Bedford	Shelbyville			SR 82 north (N Main Street)	Western end of SR 82 concurrency
Bedford	Shelbyville			SR 82 south – Lynchburg	Eastern end of SR 82 concurrency
Bedford	Shelbyville			SR 64 east (Depot Street) – Wartrace	Eastern end of SR 64 concurrency
Bedford	Shelbyville			Bridge over the Duck River	
Bedford	Raus			SR 276 north (Thompson Creek Road)	Southern terminus of SR 276
Moore	No major junctions				
Coffee	Tullahoma			SR 55 west (Wilson Avenue) – Lynchburg	Western end of SR 55 concurrency
Coffee	Tullahoma			US 41A north (N Jackson Street/SR 16 north) – Shelbyville	Western end of US 41A/SR 16 concurrency
Coffee	Tullahoma			US 41A south (S Jackson Street/SR 16 south) – Winchester SR 55 east (W Carroll Street) to I-24 – Manchester	Eastern end of US 41A/SR 16/SR 55 concurrency
Franklin				SR 476 south (Awalt Road) – Broadview	Northern terminus of SR 476; provides access to Tims Ford State Park
Franklin	Winchester			Bridge over the Elk River/Tims Ford Lake	
Franklin	Winchester			PFC Nathan B. Clemons Memorial Bridge over Tims Ford Lake	
Franklin	Winchester	51.22	82.43	2nd Avenue NW	Former eastern terminus (former alignment of SR 50)
Franklin	Winchester	51.3	82.6	US 64 Bus. (1st Avenue NW/S High Street) / SR 16 / SR 50 – Lynchburg, Decherd	Current eastern terminus
1.000 mi = 1.609 km; 1.000 km = 0.621 mi: Concurrency terminus
