= Shady Grove, Franklin County, Tennessee =

Shady Grove, Tennessee
- Unincorporated community
- Location within Tennessee Location within the United States
- Coordinates: 35°18′14″N 85°59′22″W
- Country: United States
- State: Tennessee
- County: Franklin
- Elevation: 984 ft (300 m)
- Time zone: UTC-6 (Central (CST))
  - Summer (DST): UTC-5 (CDT)
- Area code: 931
- GNIS feature ID: 1647467

Shady Grove is an unincorporated community in Franklin County, Tennessee, United States. Shady Grove is located near the Elk River 10.7 miles (17.2 km) northeast of Winchester.
