= Franklin County School District (Tennessee) =

School district in Winchester, Tennessee

Franklin County Schools

Address
- 215 S. College Street Winchester, Tennessee, 37398; United States

District information
- Type: Public
- Grades: PreK–12
- School board: Franklin County Board of Education
- Accreditation: Tennessee Department of Education
- Schools: 12 + Virtual School
- NCES District ID: 4701290

Franklin County School District is a school district headquartered in Winchester, Tennessee, serving all of Franklin County.

== History ==
The school district used to be headquartered in the former Townsend school, a segregated African-American high school. Townsend closed down in 1966.

The current address where the district is headquartered is also part of the former location of Mary Sharp College, the first women's college to offer equivalent degrees as to men's.

== Schools ==
- Elementary Schools
  - Broadview Elementary School
  - Clark Memorial Elementary School
  - Cowan Elementary School
  - Decherd Elementary School
  - North Lake Elementary School
  - Rock Creek Elementary School
  - Sewanee Elementary School
- Middle Schools
  - North Middle School
- High Schools
  - Franklin County High School
- Other
  - Alternative School
  - Franklin County Virtual School (6-8)
  - Huntland Schools (K-12)

== See also ==
- Franklin County, Tennessee
- Winchester, Tennessee
