= Iris Rudder =

American politician (born 1960)

Member of the Tennessee House of Representatives from the 39th district
- Incumbent
- Assumed office January 8, 2019
- Preceded by: David Alexander

Personal details
- Born: November 11, 1960 (age 66)
- Party: Republican
- Spouse: Michael Rudder
- Children: 2

Iris Rudder (born November 11, 1960) is an American politician. A Republican, she has represented the 39th district in the Tennessee House of Representatives since 2019. The district encompasses Moore County and parts of Franklin County and Marion County.

== Political career ==
Rudder served as chair of the Franklin County Republican Party from 2011 to 2015. She is still currently the President of the Franklin County Republican Ladies since having assumed the position in 2016. She is also a founder of the Southern Tennessee Ladies Society.

In 2018, Rudder began her campaign to become a member of the Tennessee House of Representatives. She won the Republican primary election for the 39th district on August 2, 2018. She would later win the election and become a member of the Tennessee House of Representatives by defeating Sharon Adams in the general election on November 6, 2018.

She is also a co-host of the Right Way Radio Show.

In 2023, Rudder supported a resolution to expel three Democratic lawmakers from the legislature for violating decorum rules. The expulsion was widely characterized as unprecedented.

=== 2018 Election ===
Republic Primary election for Tennessee House of Representatives District 39

Rudder won the Republic Primary election on August 2, 2018.

Candidate	%	Votes
Iris Rudder	40.3	3,464
Sloan Andrew Stewart	35.9	3,081
Richard Helton	23.8	2,042

General election for Tennessee House of Representatives District 39

Rudder won the election on November 6, 2018.

Candidate	%	Votes
Iris Rudder (R)	69.5	13,682
Sharon Adams (D)	30.5	6,018

== Biography ==
Rudder is married with two children. Her home city is in Winchester, Tennessee. Rudder is a Christian.

== Awards and honors ==
- 2015 Statesman of the Year for the 4th District
