= Penile Hill =

Mountain in the United States of America

Coordinates: 35.2486933°N 86.0366496°W

Penile Hill is a summit in Franklin County, Tennessee, in the United States. With an elevation of 1,152 feet (351 m), Penile Hill is the 1,207th highest summit in the state of Tennessee.
