= George Fraley =

American politician

Member of the Tennessee House of Representatives from the 39th district
- In office January 8, 1997 – January 11, 2011
- Preceded by: Billy Rigsby
- Succeeded by: David Alexander

Personal details
- Born: April 4, 1931
- Died: August 24, 2016 (aged 85) Nashville, Tennessee, U.S.
- Party: Democratic
- Spouse: Betty
- Children: 2
- Education: Middle Tennessee State University (BS)
- Website: House website

Military service
- Allegiance: United States
- Years of service: 1951–1953
- Battles/wars: Korean War

George W. Fraley (April 4, 1931 – August 24, 2016) was an American politician who was a member of the Tennessee House of Representatives from 1997 to 2011. He was a member of the Democratic Party and represented the 39th district.

== Early life and education ==
George W. Fraley was born on April 4, 1931. Between 1951 and 1953, Fraley served in the United States Armed Forces during the Korean War. In 1955, he graduated from Middle Tennessee State University with a BS. He later completed certifications at the University of Alabama in Huntsville.

== Career ==
After graduating, Fraley spent a short time as a secondary school teacher and insurance adjuster before joining the Arnold Engineering Development Center. He would work as an engineer, and eventually supervisor, for the Center over a 32-year career. In 1961, Fraley also became the manager and operator of a livestock farm.

Before entering the state legislature, Fraley served in local government in Franklin County. He served as county commissioner from 1969 to 1982 and as county executive from 1990 to 1994.

== Tennessee House of Representatives ==
In 1996, Fraley ran for election as a Democrat to the 39th district of the Tennessee House of Representatives. He won the election, and went on to serve 14 years in the state house.

In 2002, Fraley was one of four Democrats who unexpectedly declined to support the proposal to create a state income tax backed by Don Sundquist and Jimmy Naifeh. Despite heavy lobbying, the proposal eventually fell short by one vote.

== Personal life ==
Fraley was married to his wife Betty, with whom he had two children. He was a member of the Churches of Christ. In 2016, his wife Betty confirmed Fraley died in Nashville after a cerebral hemorrhage.
