= Eric Taylor (gridiron football) =

Canadian American football player (born 1981)

No. 90, 79
- Position: Defensive tackle

Personal information
- Born: December 14, 1981 (age 44); Winchester, Tennessee, U.S.
- Listed height: 6 ft 3 in (1.91 m)
- Listed weight: 309 lb (140 kg)

Career information
- High school: Winchester (TN) Franklin County
- College: Memphis
- NFL draft: 2004: 7th round, 212th overall pick

Career history
- Pittsburgh Steelers (2004–2005)*; Minnesota Vikings (2005); Seattle Seahawks (2006–2007)*; Tennessee Titans (2008)*; Edmonton Eskimos (2008–2009); Toronto Argonauts (2010); BC Lions (2011–2014); Calgary Stampeders (2015)*
- * Offseason or practice squad member only
- Stats at Pro Football Reference
- Stats at CFL.ca

Eric Taylor (born December 14, 1981) is an American former professional football defensive tackle who played in the National Football League (NFL) and Canadian Football League (CFL). He was selected by the Pittsburgh Steelers in the seventh round of the 2004 NFL draft. He played college football at Memphis.

He was also a member of the Minnesota Vikings, Seattle Seahawks, and Tennessee Titans of the NFL and the Edmonton Eskimos, Toronto Argonauts, BC Lions and Calgary Stampeders of the CFL.

== Professional career ==
=== Edmonton Eskimos ===
Taylor played his first two seasons in the CFL for the Edmonton Eskimos. He only played the last 5 weeks of the 2008 CFL season but still amassed 16 tackles and 1 sack. He also recovered his first and only fumble of his career on October 10, 2008. In his second year in the CFL Taylor collected 28 tackles and 2 sacks in 13 games played.

=== Toronto Argonauts ===
On February 10, 2010, Taylor was traded to the Toronto Argonauts from the Eskimos in exchange for receivers Andre Talbot and Brad Smith. In the 2010 CFL season Taylor once again played in 13 games, this time only recording 17 tackles, but 3 sacks, a career high at the time.

=== BC Lions ===
He signed with the BC Lions through free agency on February 16, 2011. In his first season with the Lions Taylor saw limited playing time. He only played in 7 games, but still managed to collect 21 tackles and 3 sacks. Taylor had a strong 2012 CFL season, he played in 15 of the 18 games, recorded 21 tackles and a career-best four sacks. On April 24, 2013, Taylor signed a contract extension with the BC Lions. Taylor played in 57 regular season games while amassing 107 tackles and 13 sacks over four years. He was released on March 2, 2015.

=== Calgary Stampeders ===
Taylor signed with the Calgary Stampeders on March 6, 2015. He was released in June 2015 during final roster cuts.
