= Sewanee Natural Bridge =

Coordinates: 35.153705°N 85.921497°W

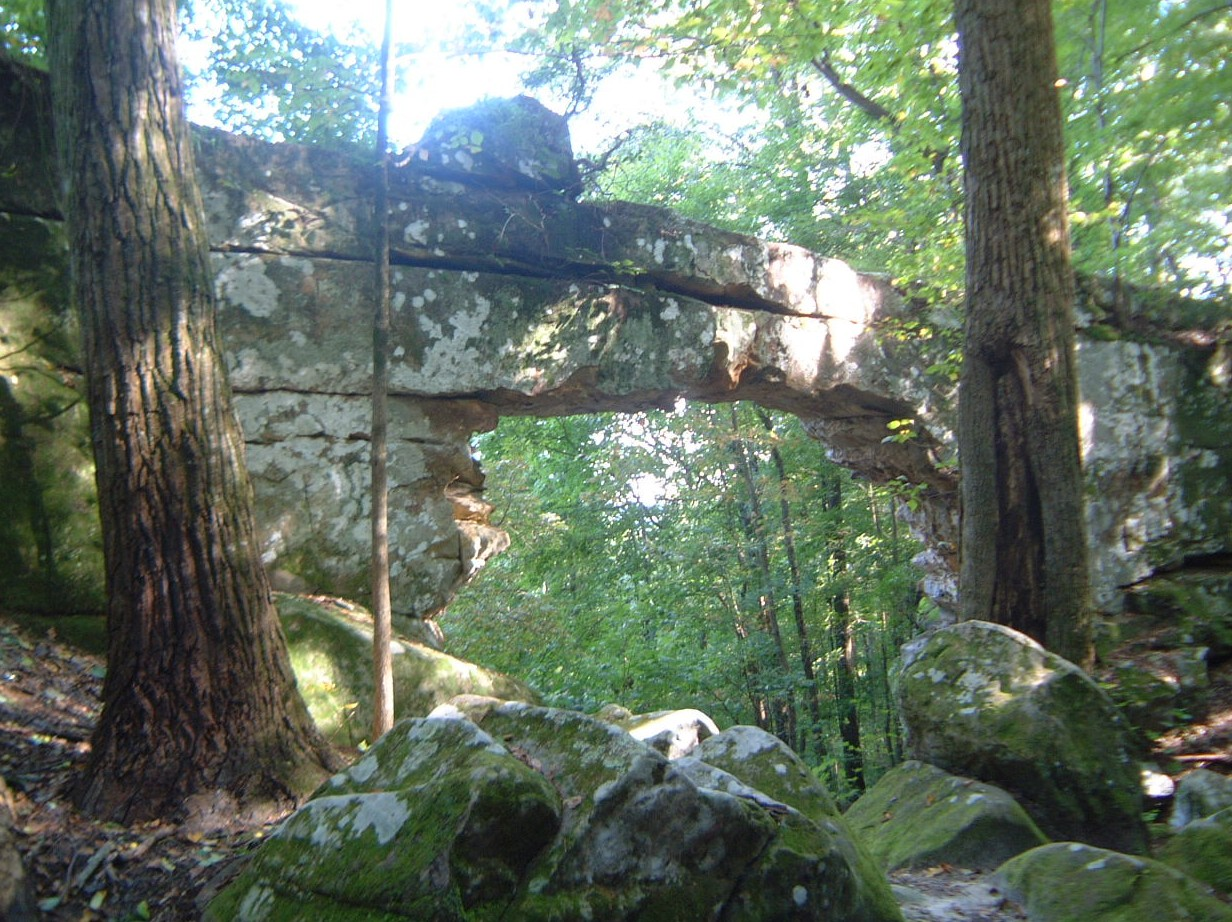
Sewanee Natural Bridge

Sewanee Natural Bridge in Franklin County, Tennessee, is a 25 feet (7.6 m) high natural sandstone arch with a span of 50 feet (15 m). It is essentially a giant sinkhole partially eroded to form a large stone bridge. A wet weather spring located behind the bridge in a rock cave probably contributed to the erosion forming the arch. It is called the Sewanee Natural Bridge as it was once owned by the University of the South in Sewanee, Tennessee. It is a 3-acre (12,000 m^{2}) designated state natural area.

The natural area is accessed via Highway Alt. 41. In Sewanee turn south onto Highway 56 and proceed 2.5 miles (4.0 km) to Natural Bridge Road. Turn left onto Natural Bridge Road and proceed 1/2 mile (800 m) to the parking area.

== In popular culture ==
The Silver Jews named their album The Natural Bridge after it.
