= Broadview, Tennessee =

Unincorporated community in Tennessee, US

Coordinates: 35.186°N 86.199°W

Broadview is an unincorporated community in western Franklin County, Tennessee, west of Winchester. Broadview is located on Tennessee State Route 50 around its junction with Tennessee State Route 476.
