= Tracy Hayworth =

American football player (born 1967)

No. 99
- Position: Linebacker

Personal information
- Born: December 18, 1967 (age 58); Winchester, Tennessee, U.S.
- Listed height: 6 ft 3 in (1.91 m)
- Listed weight: 260 lb (118 kg)

Career information
- High school: Franklin County (Winchester)
- College: Tennessee
- NFL draft: 1990: 7th round, 174th overall pick

Career history
- Detroit Lions (1990–1995); Atlanta Falcons (1996)*; Nashville Kats (1998–1999)
- * Offseason or practice squad member only

Career NFL statistics
- Tackles: 113
- Sacks: 10
- Interceptions: 1
- Stats at Pro Football Reference

Tracy Keith Hayworth (born December 18, 1967) is an American former professional football player who was a linebacker in the National Football League (NFL). He was selected by the Detroit Lions in the seventh round of the 1990 NFL draft with the 174th overall pick. He played college football for the Tennessee Volunteers. He played high school for the Franklin County High School Rebels, as a running back, class of 1985. On March 15, 2023, Tracy Hayworth was named the new head football coach at his alma mater, Franklin County High School in Winchester, Tennessee.
