= Shellsford, Tennessee =

- Unincorporated community
- Location within Tennessee Location within the United States
- Coordinates: 35°40′17″N 85°42′40″W
- Country: United States
- State: Tennessee
- County: Warren
- Elevation: 920 ft (280 m)
- Time zone: UTC-6 (Central (CST))
  - Summer (DST): UTC-5 (CDT)
- ZIP code: 37110
- Area code: 931
- GNIS feature ID: 1314275

Shellsford is an unincorporated community in Warren County, Tennessee, in the United States. It lies west of Cardwell Mountain, roughly along the path of Old Shellsford Road and Shellsford Highway, and mostly south of the Collins River.

== History ==
A post office was established in 1880 as "Meadville" but the name was changed later that year to Shells, then Shellsford, and remained open until 1904. It was named after local settler Christian (or James) Shell who built a grist mill at a ford in the river. The Shellsford Baptist Church, formed in 1810, is the oldest active congregation in Warren County and was once named "Buck Springs" after a local spring noted for easy deer hunting. It was a stop for Cherokees along the Trail of Tears. During the late 1800s the Mead & DeBard saw & grist mills at Shellsford were some of the largest employers in the Collins River Valley. It closed around the time of the Great Depression. The community used to host haywagon parties and guided excursions in Higginbotham Cave (now Cumberland Caverns) during the late 1800s and early 1900s.
