= Lynching of Jim McIlherron =

1918 lynching in Tennessee, United States

- Location: Estill Springs, Tennessee, U.S.
- Date: February 12, 1918
- Attack type: Lynching

Jim McIlherron was an African-American man who was tortured and executed by a lynch mob on February 12, 1918, in Estill Springs, Tennessee. McIlherron was lynched in retaliation for shooting and killing two white men after a fight broke out.

Walter White wrote a report on the lynching for the May 1918 issue of the NAACP magazine The Crisis.

It was also covered by the York Daily Record and The New York Times in February 1918.

== Personal life ==
Jim McIlherron lived with his parents and several brothers. The father, who owned his own land during a time of "separate, but equal" in America, was despised for being wealthy "for a negro".^{p. 17}

== Relationship with the community ==
After the Civil War, of which Tennessee was a Confederate state, Tennessee enacted Jim Crow laws and held a separate, but equal mentality.

The McIlherron family aggravated the local white community, as they had a reputation for not backing down to insults from whites. The family had become a bit more wealthy than their white neighbors. The people in the Estill Springs area were generally the poorer white folk,^{p. 17} with plenty of churches.^{p. 16} Their concept of "a good nigger" was one that humbled himself to white "superiors", and the community regarded Jim McIlherron as the "bad sort".^{p. 17} McIlherron also carried his automatic revolver with him everywhere.^{p. 17}

About a year before the lynching, McIlherron was arrested for getting into a fight with his brother, as he had cut his brother with a knife. Sheriff John Rose, the sheriff of Franklin County, had arrested him, and McIlherron threatened that he would "get" the sheriff, if he ever tried to arrest him again. McIlherron went on to work at an industrial plant in Indianapolis, then moving on to Detroit, but suffered a rheumatism attack and had to return home, just shortly before the shooting. The sheriff was scared of him, and the community feared his travel North gave him a sense of self-independence.^{p. 17}

=== Rockings ===
The local young, white men had a habit of criminal "rocking" young black men. McIlherron had once been the victim of abusive rock-throwing by some of the young men, and threatened that if anyone threw rocks at him again, someone was going to get hurt.^{p. 17}

== Preceding events ==
At around 5:00pm, McIlherron was walking by Tate & Dickens' store, when he passed by three young, white men: Pierce Rogers, Frank Tigert, and Jesse Tigert.^{p. 17} As McIlherron passed by, the young men began making remarks while throwing rocks at him. The young men began laughing, and McIlherron argued back. The argument kept escalating, until they began threatening one another. A witness said that one of the young men walked into the store, and that McIlherron thought he was threatening to start a fight. In response to the action and threat, McIlherron pulled out his gun and shot six times, having hit all three of them, twice.^{p. 18} Pierce Rogers died immediately, and Jesse Tigert died about twenty minutes later. Frank Tigert received care from Dr. O. L. Walker, and recovered, as his wounds weren't serious.^{p. 18}

=== Pursuit ===
McIlherron returned home, then took off to leave town. The crowd didn't pursue him right away, but sent $60 for bloodhounds from Winchester, about 15 miles away, to track him. The pursuit was successful only in tracking back to his home, and the scent had been lost.^{p. 18}

=== Lynch mob forms ===
Relatively few people pleaded that it be left up to the Sheriff, but the mob rejected the idea, feeling that the Sheriff was scared of McIlherron. Instead, they shouted, "Lynch the nigger!" When the Sheriff heard of the ordeal, however, he immediately left for Estill Springs. It was already being decided, at this point, that the mob would burn him. "Electrocution is too good for the damned nigger," and, "Let's burn the black —", along with similar statements were made by the crowd.^{p. 18}

=== Escape and murder of Reverend G. W. Lych ===
McIlherron's escape was believed to have been assisted by Reverend G. W. Lych.^{p. 18} Rev. Lych was already despised in the community, as he would teach that African-Americans were "made of the same clay" as the whites, and that they were as good as anybody else.^{p. 17} When news got around that Rev. Lych helped McIlherron escape, two members of the mob approached the Reverend's home. One man fired at Lych but the gun failed to go off. Rev. Lych used this opportunity to grab the gun, break it, and attack to defend himself. But the other man shot him in the chest, killing him instantly.^{p. 18}

=== Capture ===
The hunt continued throughout the weekend, and McIlherron was captured on Monday night, in a barn near Lower Collins River. The posse began firing upon the barn, and McIlherron fired back. Deputy Sheriff S. J. Byars and Policeman J. M. Bain were involved with the posse. During the shootout, McIlherron had been wounded. One eye had been shot out, as well as one shot to the leg and one to the arm. When McIlherron was finally forced to quit fighting due to blood loss, the posse of over 100 men tried to lynch him, right there in McMinnville. The citizens wouldn't have it, however, and so they put him on Train #5 to Estill Springs, having arrived at 6:30pm on Tuesday.^{p. 18}

== Following events ==
=== An excited crowd ===
Awaiting McIlherron's arrival, crowds poured in with excitement, waiting in anticipation as to what torture would become of McIlherron. Families traveled in from a 50-mile radius, coming from Coalmont, Winchester, Decherd, Tullahoma, McMinnville, and the county districts.^{p. 19}

=== Burned alive ===
A mob formed, took McIlherron out of town, chained him to a tree, and used hot irons to force a confession, as well as to implicate another African-American in the crime. McIlherron was never given due process of law, but the lynch mob, instead, decided "to have some fun with the damned nigger" before he died. The mob encouraged to "burn the damned hound" and "poke his eyes out", among other things. The crowd was highly amused by his torture.^{p. 19} No effort was ever made to stop the lynching, and McIlherron was never given a trial.

Contrary to newspaper reports, eyewitnesses said that McIlherron never cringed during the burning, and didn't cry for mercy, but cursed those who tortured him, until his last breath. He endured the burning for a half hour. At one point, he begged his torturers to shoot him, but the mob shouted back at him.^{p. 20}

In the final moments of his life, the mob up front had become sickened by the scene. Others from the back pushed their way forward to participate in the burning; but finally, one man poured coal oil on his trousers and shoes, lit the fire, and within a few minutes, the fire arose and McIlherron was dead.^{p. 20}

== Aftermath ==
The NAACP sent a telegram to President Woodrow Wilson asking him to speak out about the lynching.

The state of Tennessee offered a reward of $500 for the apprehension and conviction of those who tortured and killed McIlherron.

The Sentinel-Record of Hot Springs, Arkansas, covered the lynching but the reporting is not consistent with Walter White's investigation. The Sentinel-Record reported that the third man shot was fatally wounded when White's investigation found, "[t]he latter will recover, as his wounds are not serious."^{p. 18} The newspaper also reported that McIlherron was lynched at the spot where the shootings occurred. White's investigation found that although that was an initial plan, because a number of women in the town objected, McIlherron was moved, "into a small clump of woods in front of the Campbellite church."^{p. 19}
