= Franklin County High School (Tennessee) =

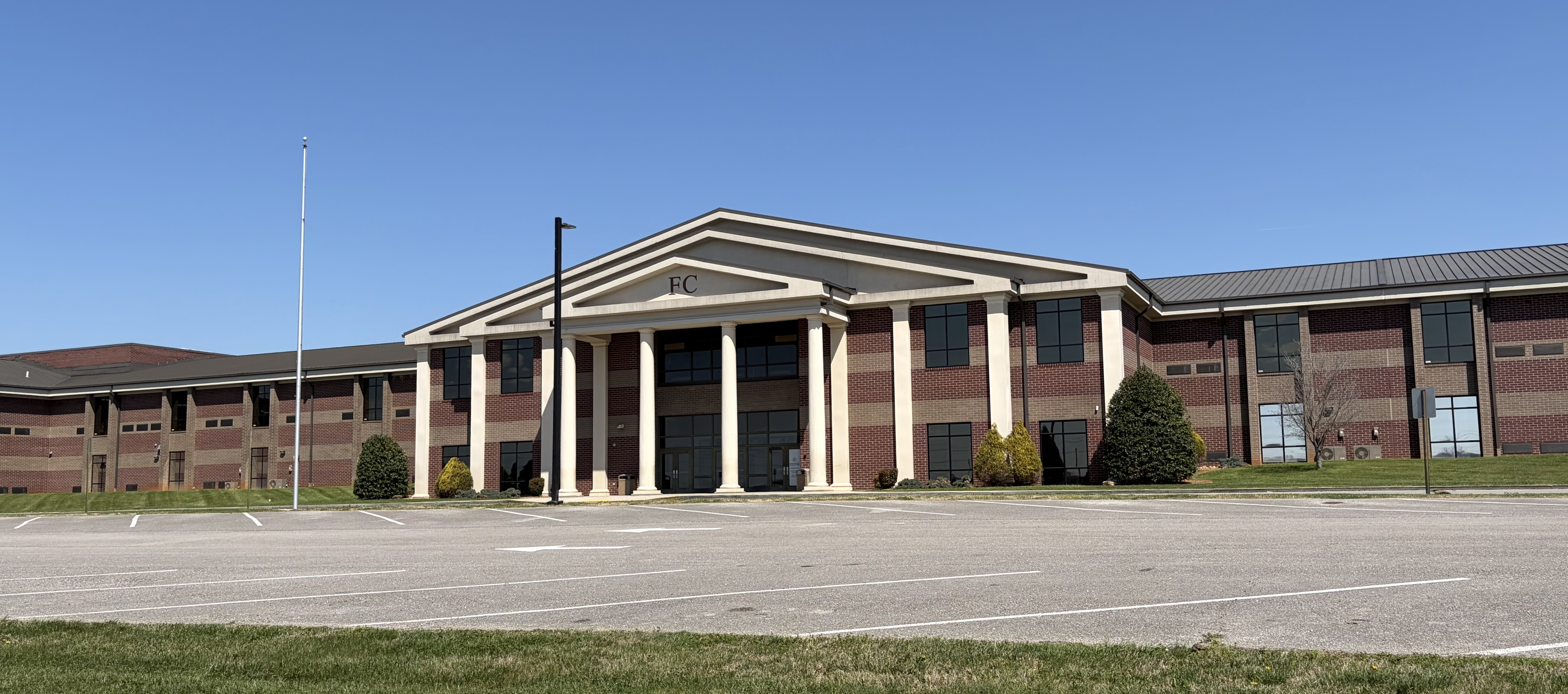
- FCHS in 2026

Location
- 833 Bypass Road; Winchester, Tennessee, Tennessee 37398; United States; 35.189°N 86.088°W

Information
- Type: Public high school
- Established: c. 1950
- Status: Active
- School district: Franklin County School District
- Principal: Brittney Butner
- Grades: 9–12
- Age range: 14-18
- Enrollment: 1,144 (2024–2025)
- Classes offered: Common core classes, Spanish, Health Science, Agriculture, Small & Large Animal Science, Culinary Arts, Business and Marketing, Computer Science, Art, Wellness, PE, Personal Fitness, Weight Lifting, ACT Prep, Dual Enrollment, EMS, Anatomy & Physiology, Accounting, Medical Therapeutics, Welding, Auto Mechanics, Cosmetology, Rehab, Stem, etc..
- Language: English
- Campus: Urban
- Colors: Blue and gray
- Nickname: Rebels
- Yearbook: The Rebel
- Website: fchs.fcstn.net

Franklin County High School is a high school located at 833 Bypass Road in Winchester, Tennessee. It is operated by the Franklin County School District.

== History ==
The school was located on Dinah Shore Boulevard in Winchester until being moved to Bypass Road in 2006. The old high school still holds a stadium and county offices such as the electoral commission. A petition circulated in 2020 to remove the school's original mascot, the rebel, and the fight song at the time, From Dixie With Love. While the mascot was only partially removed, the fight song was changed entirely to Boomer Sooner, the fight song of University of Oklahoma, in 2021.

== Administrators ==
- Brittney Butner – Principal
- Bradley Cowan – Assistant Principal (Grade 9)
- Ryan Gilmer – Assistant Principal (Grades 10-11)

== Athletics ==
Students may participate in a variety of athletic programs:

- Baseball – Boys – Spring
- Basketball – Boys and Girls – Winter
- Bowling – Boys and Girls - Fall
- Cheerleading – Girls – Fall and Winter (Football, Basketball)
- Cross Country – Boys and Girls – Fall
- Football – Boys – Fall
- Golf – Boys and Girls – Fall
- Soccer – Boys and Girls – Girls in fall, Boys in Spring
- Softball – Girls – Spring
- Swimming – Boys and Girls – Winter
- Tennis – Boys and Girls – Spring
- Track and Field – Boys and Girls – Spring
- Volleyball – Girls – Fall
- Wrestling – Boys and Girls – Winter
- Marching Band – Boys and Girls – Fall

In 2024, the women's soccer team won the TSSAA Division I, Class AA state championship. Following the tournament, the school's own Cali Banks was named Most Valuable Player in the Division I, Class AA state bracket.

== Notable alumni ==
- Bobby Majors – football player
- Phillip Fulmer – former football coach of the Tennessee Volunteers (1992–2008) and Athletic Director (2017–2021)
- Jeff Hall – Tennessee Volunteer and St Louis Rams Place kicker
- Tracy Hayworth – Tennessee Volunteers (1986–1989), Detroit Lions (1990–1995)
- Eric Taylor – Minnesota Vikings (2005), Edmonton Eskimos (2008–2009) Toronto Argonauts (2010) BC Lions (2011–2014) Calgary Stampeders (2015–present)
