= Midway, Franklin County, Tennessee =

Midway
- Unincorporated community
- Location within Tennessee Location within the United States
- Coordinates: 35°12′33″N 85°52′58″W
- Country: United States
- State: Tennessee
- County: Franklin
- Elevation: 1,998 ft (609 m)
- Time zone: UTC-6 (Central (CST))
  - Summer (DST): UTC-5 (CDT)
- Area code: 931
- GNIS feature ID: 1293723

Midway, also known as "Tickbush", is an unincorporated community in Franklin County, Tennessee. Midway is 3.25 miles (5.23 km) southwest of Monteagle.
