= Tims Ford State Park =

State park in Tennessee, United States

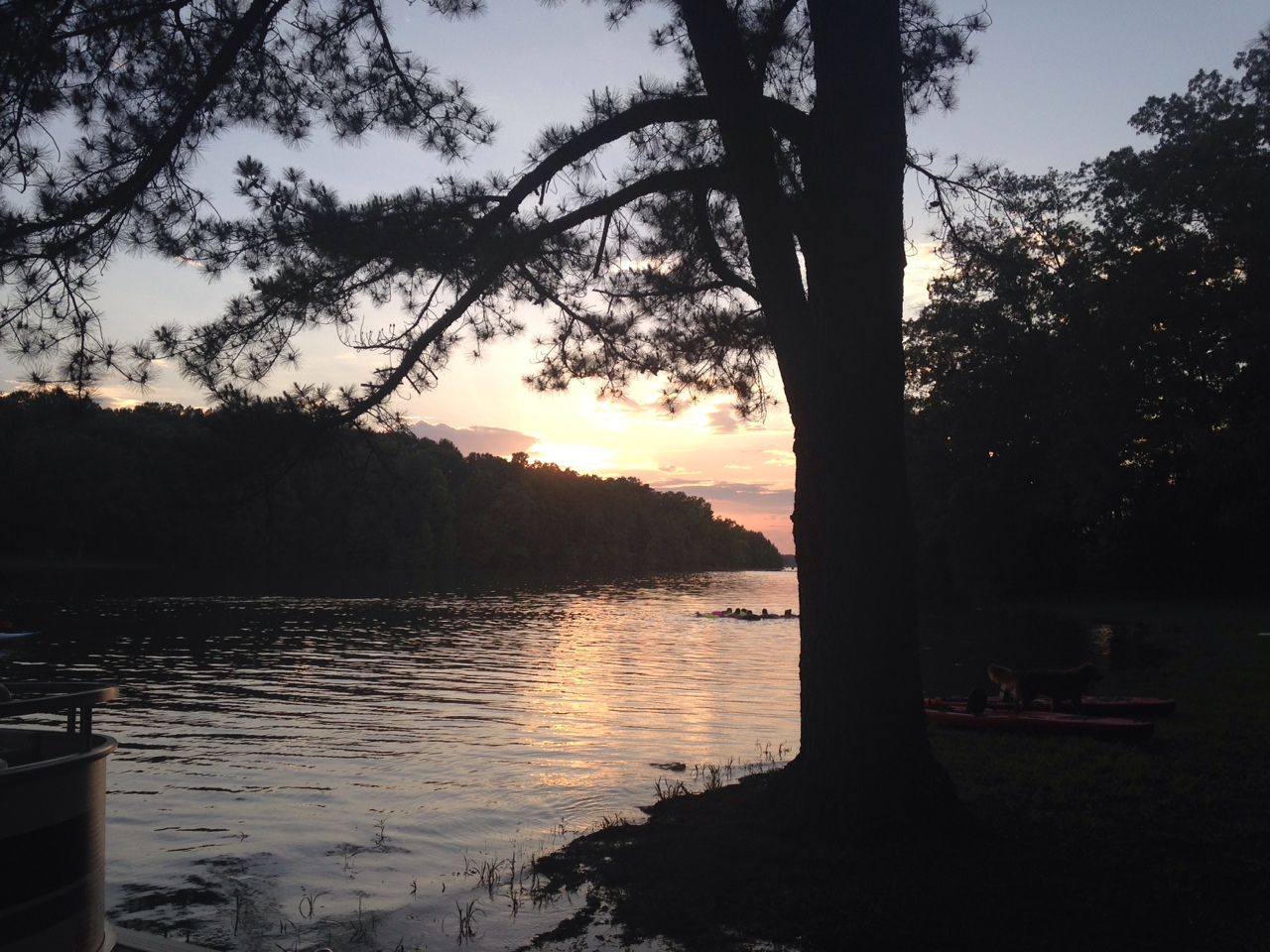
- Tims Ford Lake from the park's campground
- Interactive map of Tims Ford State Park
- Type: Tennessee State Park
- Location: Franklin County, Tennessee
- Coordinates: 35.219568°N 86.250586°W
- Area: 3,546 acres (1,435 hectares)
- Created: 1978
- Operator: Tennessee Department of Environment and Conservation
- Open: Year round
- Website: Tims Ford State Park

Tims Ford State Park, also known as Tims Ford State Rustic Park, is a state park in Franklin County, in the U.S. state of Tennessee. The 3,546-acre (1,435 ha; 14.35 km^{2}) state park is situated on the north shore of Tims Ford Lake near the north escarpment of the Cumberland Plateau, about ten miles from the city of Winchester.

== History ==
In 1978, the park opened with 478 acres (193 hectares), including a visitor center, 20 cabins, and 50 camp sites.

In 1997, almost 20 years later, the state of Tennessee bought an additional 1,600 acres (650 hectares) for the park from the Tennessee Valley Authority for US$1.3 million (equivalent to $2.6 million in 2025).

In 1999, the first major expansion of the park facilities was the opening of the 6,790-yard (6,210 m) Bear Trace Tims Ford Golf Course, designed by Jack Nicklaus.

Since the year 2000, the Tims Ford Reservoir Land Management and Disposition Plan has enabled the park to expand further by approximately 2,000 acres (810 hectares).

In 2011, a new 4,000-square-foot (370 m^{2}) visitor center opened.

== Geography ==
Geologically, the park is located in the Highland Rim province, a hilly, slightly dissected area characterized by karst topography and scattered knobs. Terrain within the park is generally steep, except when approaching the lake shore.

Tims Ford Lake, from which the park takes its name, was formed by a TVA hydroelectric dam over the Elk River. This dam was completed in 1970. The lake itself is named after an early river crossing.

== Amenities ==
The park has 11 hiking and biking trails.

== Facilities and management ==
The park is open year round and is managed by the Tennessee Department of Environment and Conservation.

The park includes 11 hiking trails, two campgrounds, two pavilions, a marina, and an 18-hole golf course called The Bear Trace, designed by Jack Nicklaus.

== See also ==
- Tennessee Department of Environment and Conservation

== Bibliography ==
- Park Brochure
