= Elk River Dam =

Coordinates: 35.2988°N 86.0976°W

The Elk River Dam, completed in 1952, impounds the Elk River in the US state of Tennessee to form the Woods Reservoir. The US Air Force and Arnold Engineering Development Center own and operate Woods Reservoir. The dam itself is just under 3,000 feet long and holds back 26 billion gallons of water on a 3,980-acre (1,610 ha) reservoir. The water is used to help the Arnold Air Force Base with cooling of their wind-tunnel equipment.

Water exiting from the dam flows along the Elk River into Tims Ford Lake.

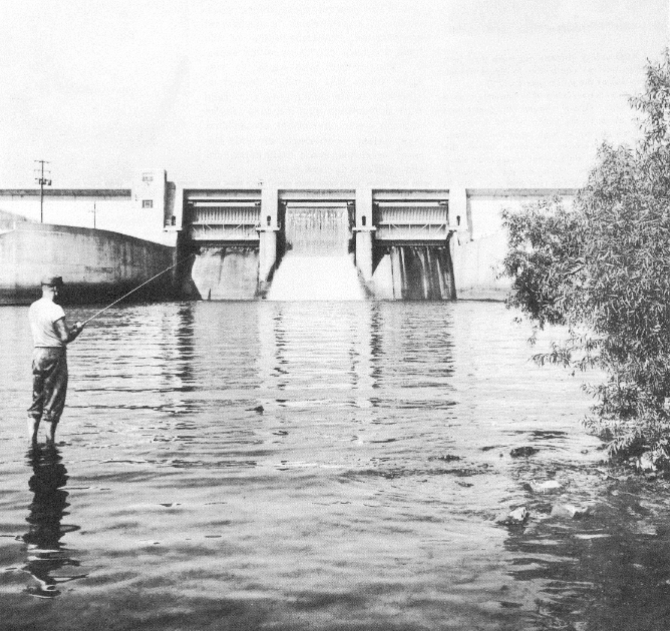
An angler fishes downstream of the Elk River Dam in the early 1960s

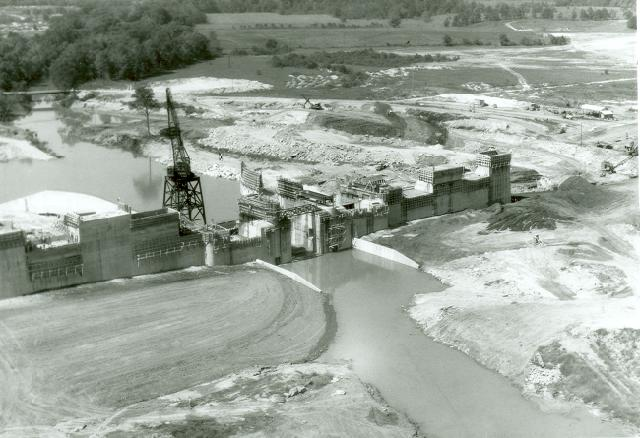
An aerial view of construction on the Elk River Dam is seen in this photo from the 1950s

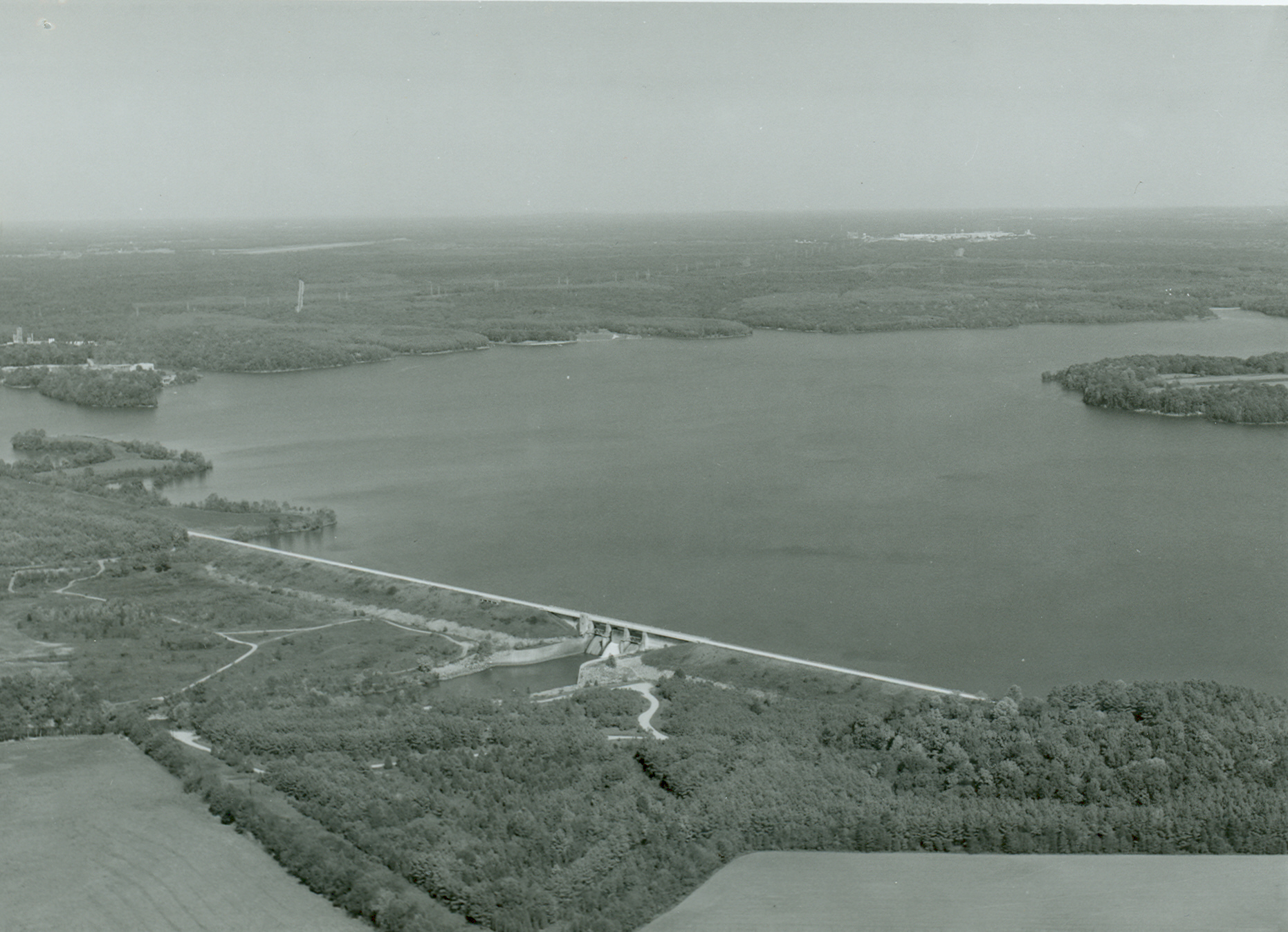
Aerial photo Woods Reservoir from the early 1980s
