= David Alexander (Tennessee politician) =

American politician (born 1952)

Member of the Tennessee House of Representatives from the 39th district
- In office January 11, 2011 – January 8, 2019
- Preceded by: George Fraley
- Succeeded by: Iris Rudder

Personal details
- Born: October 29, 1952 (age 74) Jackson, Mississippi, U.S.
- Party: Republican
- Spouse: Lucille
- Children: 3
- Education: Mississippi College (BA)

Military service
- Branch/service: United States Army
- Unit: 82nd Airborne Division

David Alexander (born October 29, 1952, in Jackson, Mississippi) is an American politician and a Republican member of the Tennessee House of Representatives who represented District 39 from 2011 to 2019.

== Education ==
Alexander earned his BA in English literature from Mississippi College.

== Elections ==
- 2012 Alexander was unopposed for the August 2, 2012, Republican Primary, winning with 4,436 votes, and won the November 6, 2012, General election with 15,097 votes (65.7%) against Democratic nominee Doug Clark.
- 2010 To challenge District 39 incumbent Democratic Representative George Fraley, Alexander was unopposed for the August 5, 2010, Republican Primary, winning with 5,405 votes, and won the November 2, 2010, General election with 11,566 votes (65.7%) against Representative Fraley.
