= Hillsboro, Tennessee =

- Census-designated place
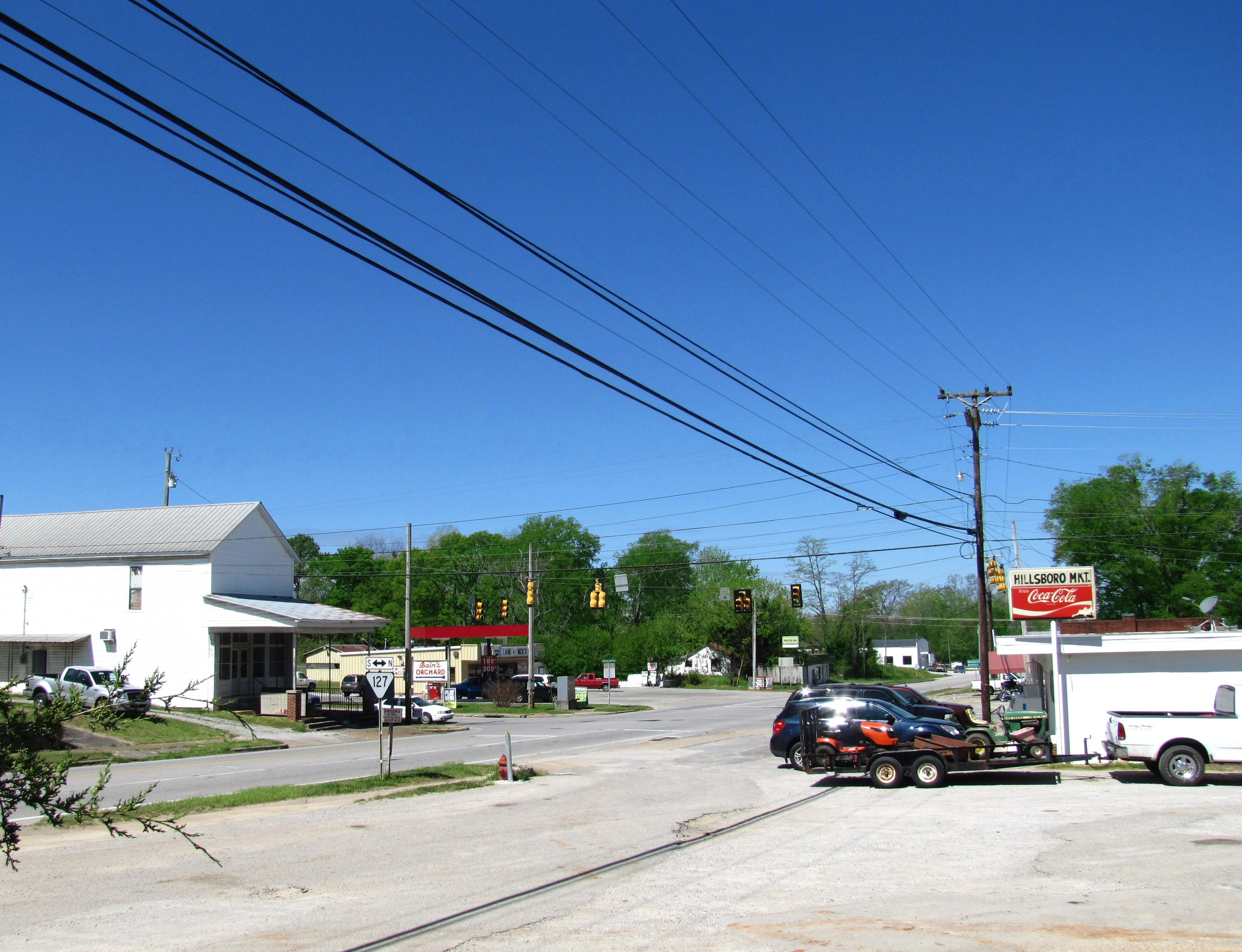

- Location within Tennessee
- Coordinates: 35°24′31″N 85°57′50″W
- Country: United States
- State: Tennessee
- County: Coffee

Area
  - Total: 4.12 sq mi (10.67 km^{2})
  - Land: 4.12 sq mi (10.67 km^{2})
  - Water: 0.0039 sq mi (0.01 km^{2})
- Elevation: 1,053 ft (321 m)

Population (2020)
  - Total: 433
  - Density: 105/sq mi (40.6/km^{2})
- Time zone: UTC-6 (Central (CST))
  - Summer (DST): UTC-5 (CDT)
- ZIP code: 37342
- Area code: 931
- GNIS feature ID: 2586062

Hillsboro is an unincorporated community in Coffee County, Tennessee, United States, that was treated as a census-designated place for the 2010 U.S. census. The population was 450 as of the 2010 census. The community is concentrated around the intersection of U.S. Route 41 and Tennessee State Route 127, between Manchester to the northwest and Monteagle to the southeast. The Cumberland Plateau rises to the east, and Arnold Air Force Base lies to the west.

== Demographics ==
Historical population
Census	Pop.	Note	%±
2020	433		—
U.S. Decennial Census
