= Elk River (Tennessee River tributary) =

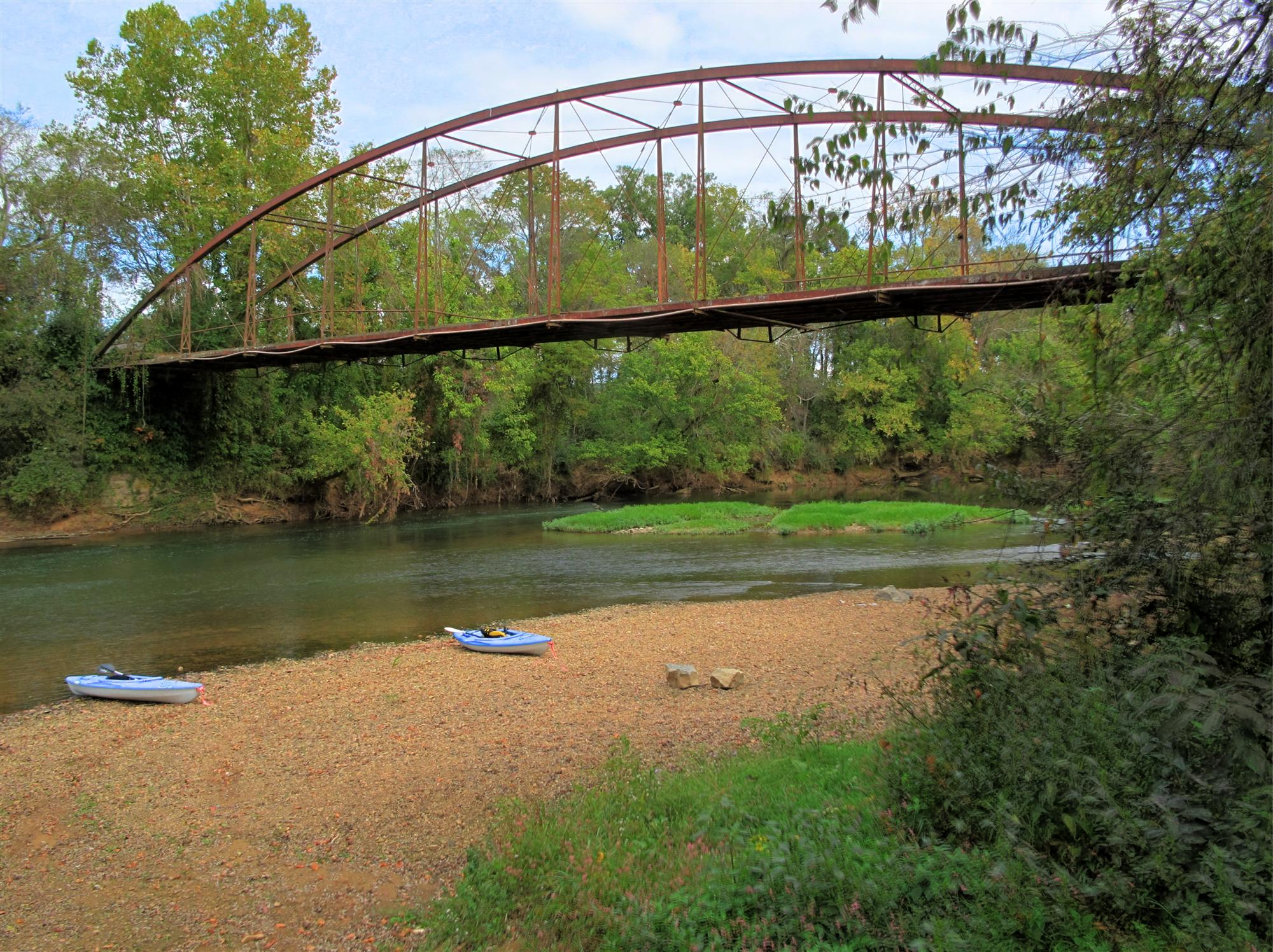
- The Cowley Bridge crosses the Elk River near Kelso, Tennessee

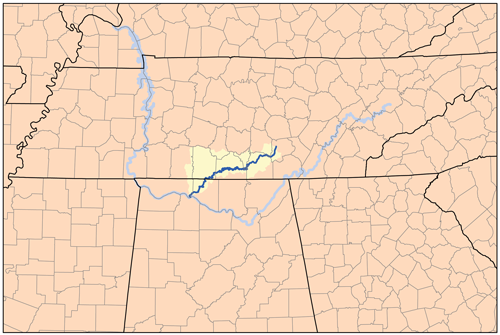
- Elk River watershed

Location
- Country: United States
- State: Tennessee, Alabama

Physical characteristics
- Source: Junction of Laurel and Jay Creeks
  - location: Cumberland Plateau, Tennessee
  - coordinates: 35°21′37″N 85°50′10″W
  - elevation: 1,010 ft (310 m)
- Mouth: Tennessee River
  - location: Wheeler Lake, Alabama
  - coordinates: 34°45′41″N 87°15′56″W
  - elevation: 558 ft (170 m)
- Length: 195 mi (314 km)
- Discharge
  - location: USGS gage 03584600 at Prospect, TN
  - average: 3,137 cu ft/s (88.8 m^{3}/s)
  - minimum: 101 cu ft/s (2.9 m^{3}/s)
  - maximum: 105,000 cu ft/s (3,000 m^{3}/s)

The Elk River is a tributary of the Tennessee River in the U.S. states of Tennessee and Alabama. The river is about 195 miles (314 km) long.

== Hydrography ==
The Elk River rises in Grundy County, Tennessee, in Burroughs Cove near the community of Elkhead. It is bridged for the first time by State Route 50 near Pelham, Tennessee. At first it flows southwestward, and turns to flow more generally westward. It is then bridged by both U.S. Route 41 and Interstate 24. Shortly below this point, it forms the Coffee County – Franklin County line. It is first impounded by Elk River Dam, forming Woods Reservoir, the impoundment of which extends upstream to about the same point where the stream ceases to serve as the Coffee-Franklin County line and is entirely in Franklin County. This reservoir was built under the auspices of the United States Army Corps of Engineers, primarily to provide a large source of cooling water for the U.S. Air Force's Arnold Engineering Development Center, which has large wind tunnels and other military and scientific research equipment. This area is also used as a wildlife refuge. The reservoir is bridged by State Route 127.

Only a few miles below Elk River Dam is the beginning of slack water (Tims Ford Lake) caused by the Tims Ford Dam of the Tennessee Valley Authority. The slack water extends upstream to the vicinity of Estill Springs. It is then bridged by U.S. Route 41A. Backwaters of the Tims Ford project also extend into the nearby town of Winchester, county seat of Franklin County, even though the main channel of the Elk runs to its west, bridged by State Route 130. A considerable amount of leakage from the reservoir is observed along State Route 50 in the form of what appear to be large springs along the north side of that road but are in fact leaking of the reservoir waters through the porous limestone rock of the area. This phenomenon has resulted in a locally-popular source of water for livestock and other uses for which filtration and treatment of the water to be used is unnecessary. State Route 50 again crosses the Elk just below Tims Ford Dam.

Shortly below the dam, the stream becomes the boundary between Franklin County and Moore County, and then subsequently between Moore County and Lincoln County. The stream begins to meander severely. It is bridged near the small community of Kelso, site of a cave used as a saltpeter mine by Confederates during the Civil War, by U.S. Route 64. The Elk flows through Fayetteville about a mile south of the courthouse, where it is bridged by U.S. Route 231/431. Until the late 1960s there was a "dry" stone masonry bridge (one in which the stones are held in place by the power of gravity forcing them against each other, not mortar) over the Elk; it was destroyed in a flood. Several miles west of Fayetteville, it is crossed by State Route 274, a highway built on an old railroad bed. It then crosses into Giles County, where it is bridged by CSX Transportation and Interstate 65 before flowing just south of Elkton, Tennessee, where it is bridged by U.S. Route 31. A few miles below this point it crosses into Limestone County, Alabama, where it meets the Tennessee River.

There are actually two Elk Rivers in Tennessee, the smaller of which is located in northeast Tennessee. This Elk River flows from the back side of Beech Mountain, North Carolina through Carter County, Tennessee and empties into Watauga Lake.

== Recreation ==
In Limestone County, Alabama there is a 21.9 miles (35.2 km) Canoe and Kayak Trail. The trail begins at the Alabama-Tennessee state line and goes to Elk River Mills.

Outside of Winchester, TN Tims Ford Lake was created by damming the Elk River which allows for boating and water based activities.

== See also ==
- List of rivers of Tennessee
- List of rivers of Alabama
