= Woods Reservoir =

- Location within Tennessee
- Location: Franklin and Coffee County, Tennessee
- Coordinates: 35°18′47″N 86°03′43″W
- Type: reservoir
- Basin countries: United States
- Surface area: 3,600 acres (15 km^{2})
- Max. depth: 50 ft (15 m)
- Surface elevation: 960 ft (290 m) Full pool

Woods Reservoir is a 3,600 acres (15 km^{2}) reservoir created by the United States Army Corps of Engineers for use as a cooling system for the United States Air Force's Arnold Engineering Development Center. The US Air Force and Arnold Engineering Development Center own and operate Woods Reservoir.

The reservoir and dam were built primarily for cooling for the Wind Tunnels that would be built on the base. According to a study by St. Louis, Missouri-based engineering firm Sverdrup & Parcel, the amount of water required annually for AEDC operations would be more than 22.4 billion US gallons (0.085 km^{3}). Of this, the vast majority – nearly 21 billion US gallons (0.079 km^{3}) – would serve as cooling water for the test facilities. The remainder would be used for air conditioning, sanitary water and fire protection. A pump house was built at the reservoir to pump water to a holding reservoir on base for eventual use.

Woods reservoir was named in honor of the late Col. Lebbeus B. Woods who was responsible for much of the early organizing, staffing and master planning for the center project.

Construction began in late 1950 and Woods Reservoir opened for public fishing and recreation on May 30, 1953

It is located in Franklin and Coffee counties in the U.S. state of Tennessee. At its deepest, the lake reaches 50 feet (15 m) (by the Elk River Dam .) Full pool elevation is 960 feet (290 m)-mean sea level and winter pool elevation is 957 feet (292 m)-mean sea level.

Fishing is a popular sport on the reservoir with 4 fishing piers. The best fishing opportunities are for Largemouth Bass, Crappie, White Bass, Yellow Bass, and Channel Catfish.
