= Tims Ford Lake =

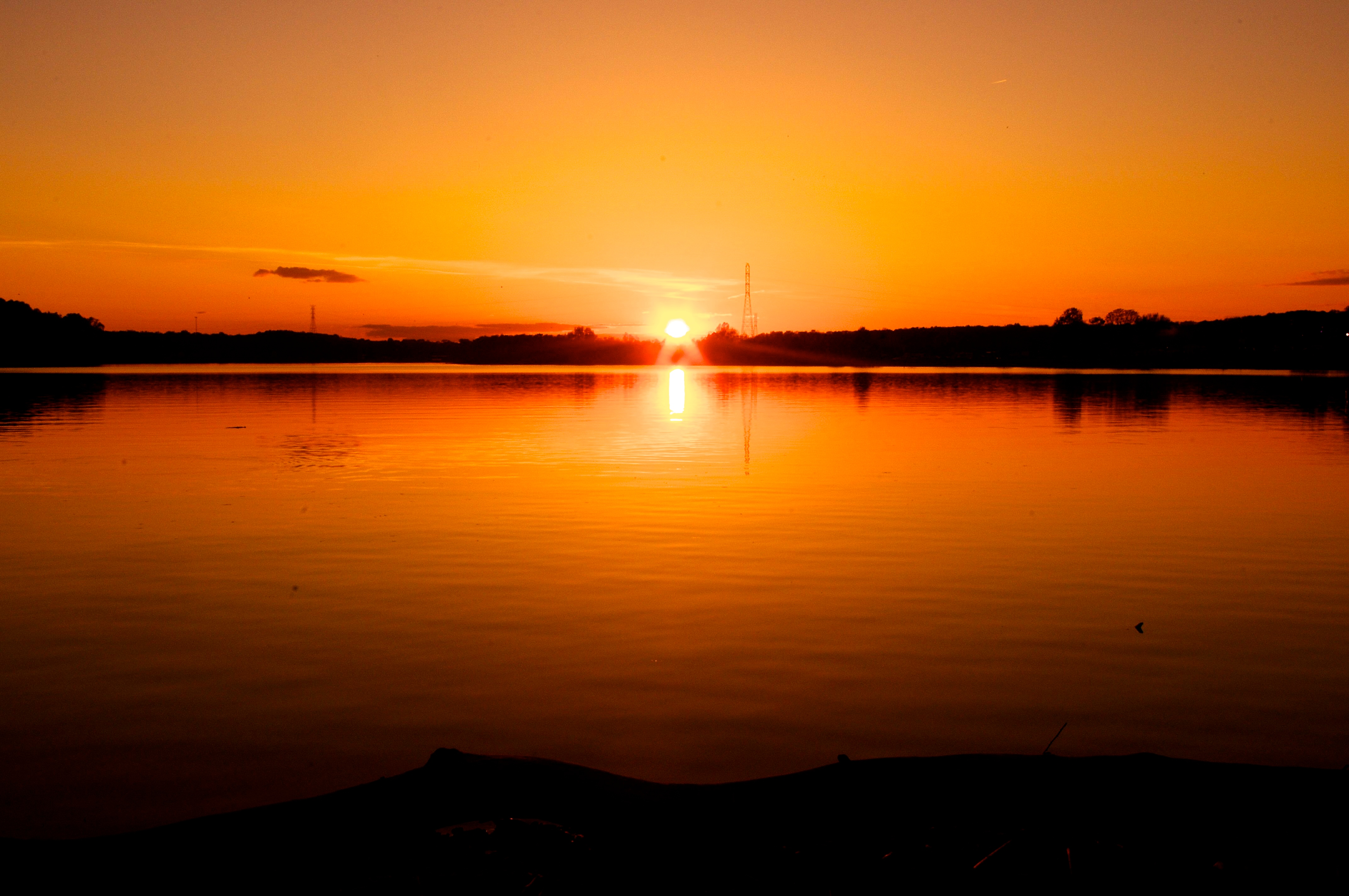
- Tims Ford Lake near Winchester

- Location within Tennessee Location within the United States
- Location: Franklin / Moore counties, Tennessee
- Coordinates: 35°11′49″N 086°16′43″W
- Type: reservoir
- Primary inflows: Elk River
- Primary outflows: Elk River
- Basin countries: United States
- Surface area: 10,700 acres (43 km^{2})
- Surface elevation: 883 ft (269 m)

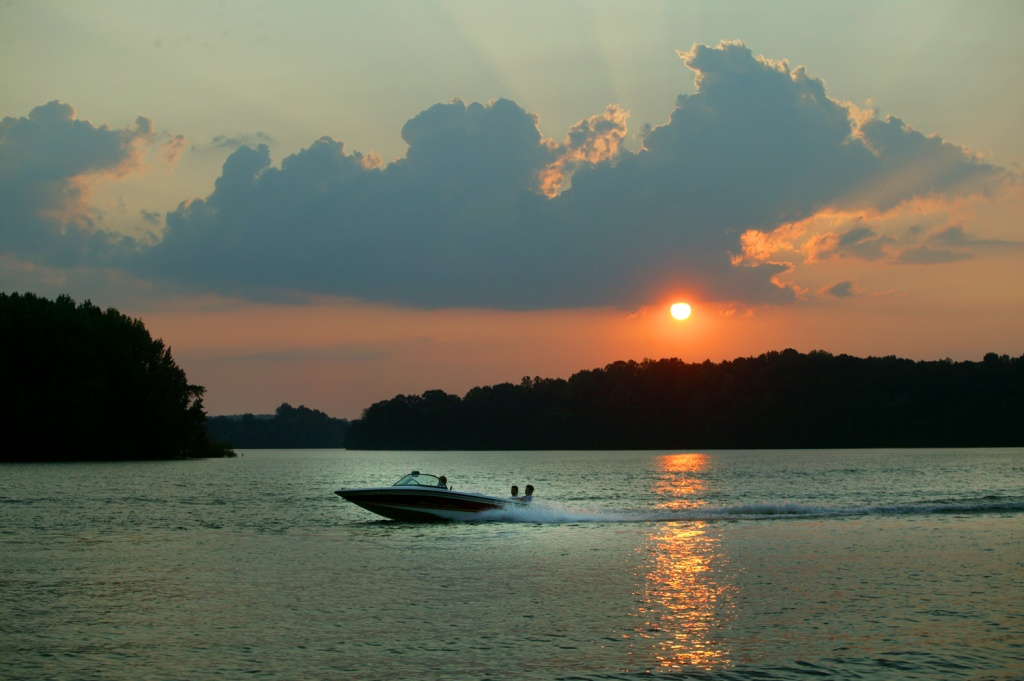
Sunrise on Tims Ford

Tims Ford Lake is a reservoir run by the Tennessee Valley Authority (TVA) in southern middle Tennessee. The lake encompasses 10,700 acres (16.7 mi^{2}; 43 km^{2}) and approximately 250 miles (400 km) of shoreline.

The Tims Ford Dam was named from an early ford crossing the Elk River near Winchester. The ford was on or near land owned by Abner Mansfield Tims, an early Franklin County settler. The ford was used until about 1885 when the Tims Ford Bridge was constructed across the river.

The massive dam and reservoir construction program that was undertaken by TVA following its creation in 1933, required the purchase of over 1,000,000 acres (4,000 km^{2}) of land for the creation of 34 reservoirs in five of the seven states in the Tennessee Valley region.

The lake is home to the 3,546 acres (14.35 km^{2}) Tims Ford State Park.

There are six islands on the lake that are accessible for camping and exploring: Leatherwood Island, Big Island, Little Island, Maple Bend Island, Goose Island, and Devils Step Island. The camping is primitive with no facilities and is managed by Tims Ford State Park. Access to the islands is via either boat or kayak.

Tims Ford Lake was designated a Bill Dance Signature Lake on Dec 21, 2021. This designation provides funds to the lake for above-the-water upgrades such as docks, fishing piers, and signage as well as other enhancements to fishing in the lake.

The lake is bordered by 5 different cities. Winchester (which is the Franklin County seat), Decherd, Estill Springs, Tullahoma, and Lynchburg.

== Tims Ford Dam ==
Tims Ford Dam was built by the TVA from 1966 to 1970, stands 175 feet (53 m) high and 1,580 feet (480 m) long at its crest, and impounds the Elk River for an average of 40 megawatts of hydroelectric power. The reservoir has a flood storage capacity of 219,600 acre-feet (270,900,000 m^{3}).

The water level in Tims Ford Reservoir varies about 15 feet (4.6 m) in a normal year with the summer level being 888 feet (271 m) above sea level.

Tims Ford Dam was TVA’s first hydroelectric facility retrofitted with a small generating unit for the purpose of maintaining instantaneous downstream minimum flows. Additionally, 85,400 cubic yards (65,300 m^{3}) of concrete make up Tims Ford Dam.

The dam was built for a few key reasons according to TVA:

1. Create a navigable channel of the Elk River from a point 14 miles downstream.
2. The power generation would provide 40 megawatts of power from the generator.
3. The dam provides water supply and flood damage reduction downstream on the Elk River, primarily for Fayetteville, Tennessee.
4. Opportunities for water oriented recreation "among the rolling hills of Middle Tennessee"
5. Future water supplies for towns in the area.
