= Franklin County, Tennessee =

County in Tennessee, United States

- County
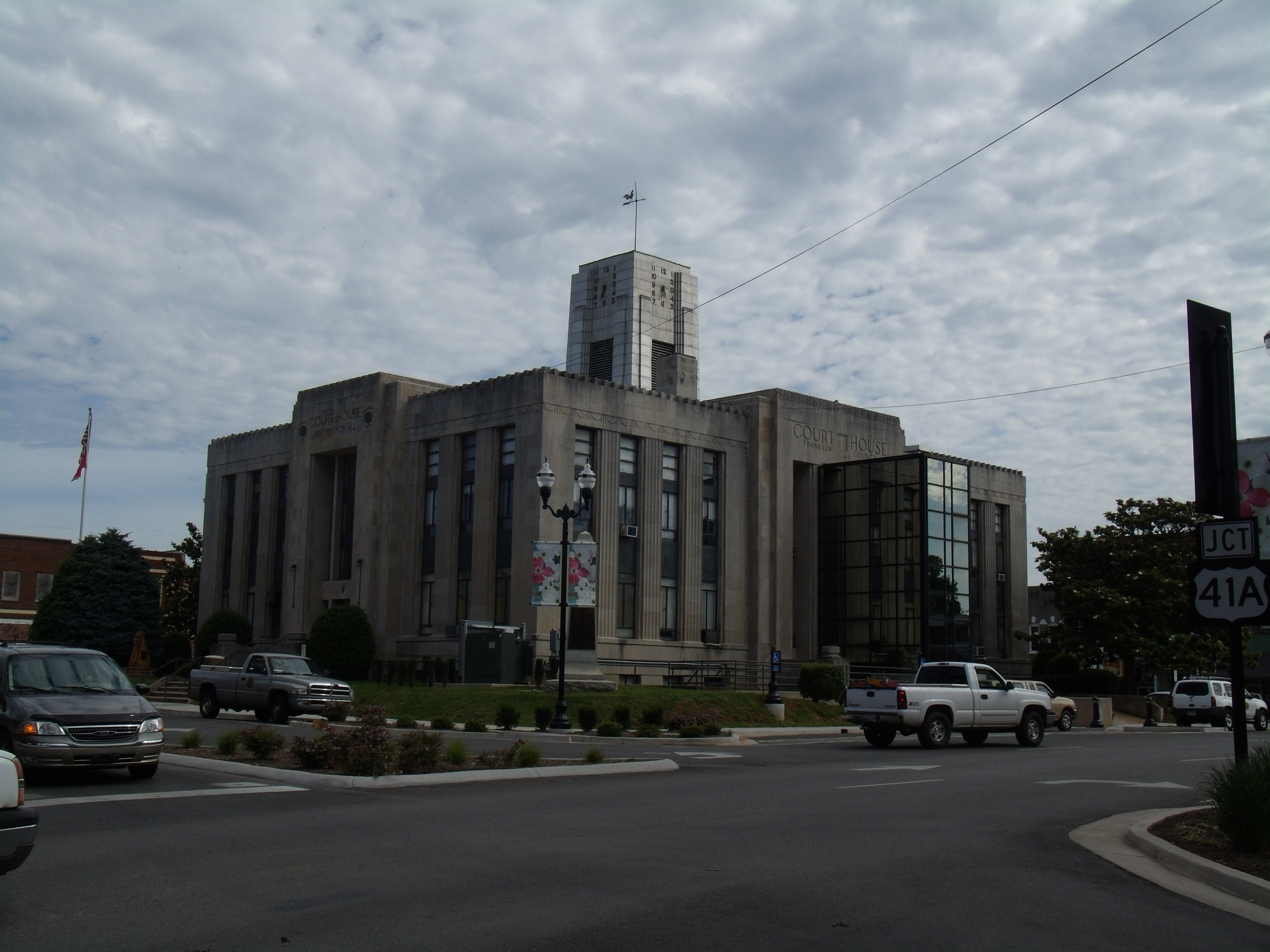
- Franklin County Courthouse in Winchester

- Flag Seal

- Location within the U.S. state of Tennessee
- Coordinates: 35°09′N 86°06′W
- Country: United States
- State: Tennessee
- Founded: 1807
- Named for: Benjamin Franklin
- Seat: Winchester
- Largest city: Winchester

Area
  - Total: 576 sq mi (1,490 km^{2})
  - Land: 555 sq mi (1,440 km^{2})
  - Water: 21 sq mi (54 km^{2}) 3.7%

Population (2020)
  - Total: 42,774
  - Estimate (2025): 45,579 ▲
  - Density: 74/sq mi (29/km^{2})
- Time zone: UTC−6 (Central)
  - Summer (DST): UTC−5 (CDT)
- Congressional district: 4th
- Website: franklincotn.us

Franklin County is a county in the U.S. state of Tennessee. It is located on the eastern boundary of Middle Tennessee in the southern part of the state. As of the 2020 census, the population was 42,774. Its county seat is Winchester. Franklin County was formerly part of the Tullahoma-Manchester, TN Micropolitan Statistical Area, it was removed in 2023 and is part of the Winchester Micropolitan Statistical Area.

== History ==
White settlement began around 1800, and the county was formally organized in 1807 and named for Benjamin Franklin. During the next several decades, the size of the county was reduced several times by reorganizations which created the neighboring counties of Coffee County, Moore County, and Grundy County. One of the most notable early settlers was frontiersman Davy Crockett, who came about 1812 but is not thought to have remained long.

The University of the South, founded by the Episcopal Church, was organized just before the Civil War. It began full operations shortly after hostilities ceased. It encompasses a full university and theological seminary. The University of Tennessee Space Institute is also located in the county.

The area became strongly secessionist before the war. Franklin County formally threatened to secede from Tennessee and join Alabama if Tennessee did not leave the union, which the state did when forced to take sides by Abraham Lincoln. This contrasted sharply with the situation in not distant Winston County, Alabama, which was largely pro-Union and provided more volunteers for the Union than the Confederacy.

During 1863, the Army of Tennessee retreated through the county, leaving it more or less under Union control for the rest of the war, although some guerrilla warfare still took place. Isham G. Harris, the Confederate governor of Tennessee, was from Franklin County. After having his political rights restored after the war, he was chosen to represent the state in the United States Senate.

During the temperance (anti-liquor) agitations of the late 19th century, residents discovered that by a quirk of state law, liquor could be sold only in incorporated towns. As a result, all of the county's towns abolished their charters in order to prohibit the sale of alcohol.

In the 20th century, Franklin County benefited from the flood control and power generation activities of the Tennessee Valley Authority (TVA), built by the President Franklin D. Roosevelt administration during the Great Depression. The TVA helped bring new industry to the area. It also created opportunities for water recreation by making new lakes, but at the same time also displaced many county residents from their soon to be submerged homes. The establishment of the federal Arnold Engineering Development Center, which is partly within the county, helped spur economic growth and technical development. The interstate highway system barely touched the county, but it did provide valuable access on Interstate 24 to nearby Chattanooga.

Two notable figures who were born in the county early in the twentieth century were singer/entertainer Dinah Shore and entrepreneur/philanthropist John Templeton. He later became a British subject and was awarded a knighthood.

During the last decades of the 19th and the first of the 20th, Tennessee, like other southern states, passed laws and constitutional amendments establishing Jim Crow: racial segregation in public facilities, restrictions of voting for blacks, and similar measures. There were few violent disturbances in Franklin County compared to many other localities, but it was not until a decade after the historic Brown v. Board of Education court decision that the county's schools were desegregated in 1964 when a lawsuit was won in Sewanee, Tennessee.

Considerable industrial growth occurred in the county in the last decades of the 20th century, including the construction of a large automobile engine plant by the Nissan corporation in Decherd. An emphasis on tourism also developed, based on Civil War history and local scenic attractions such as the dogwood forests, for which an annual festival is held.

== Geography ==
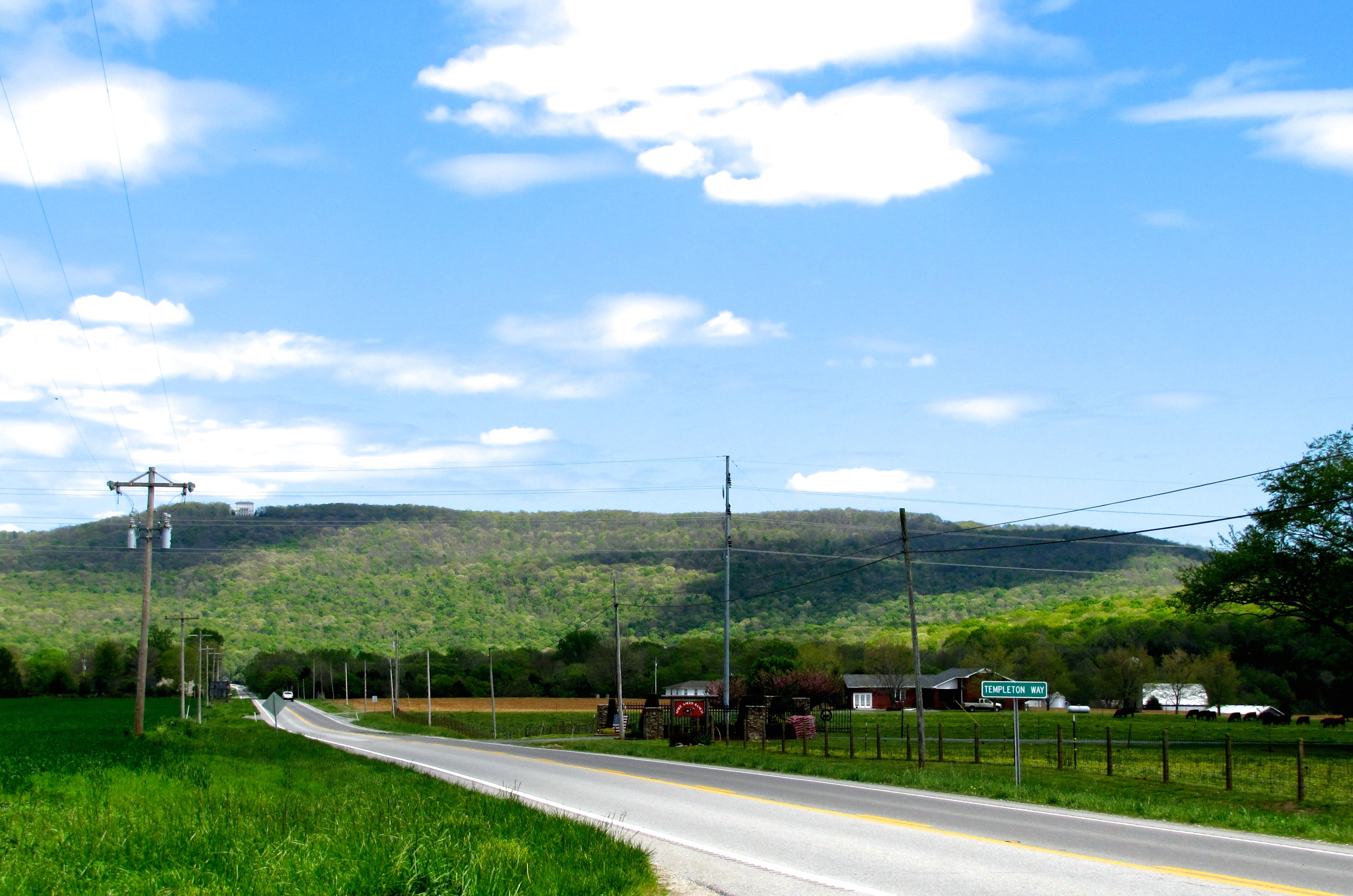
US 41A approaching the Cumberland Plateau near Cowan

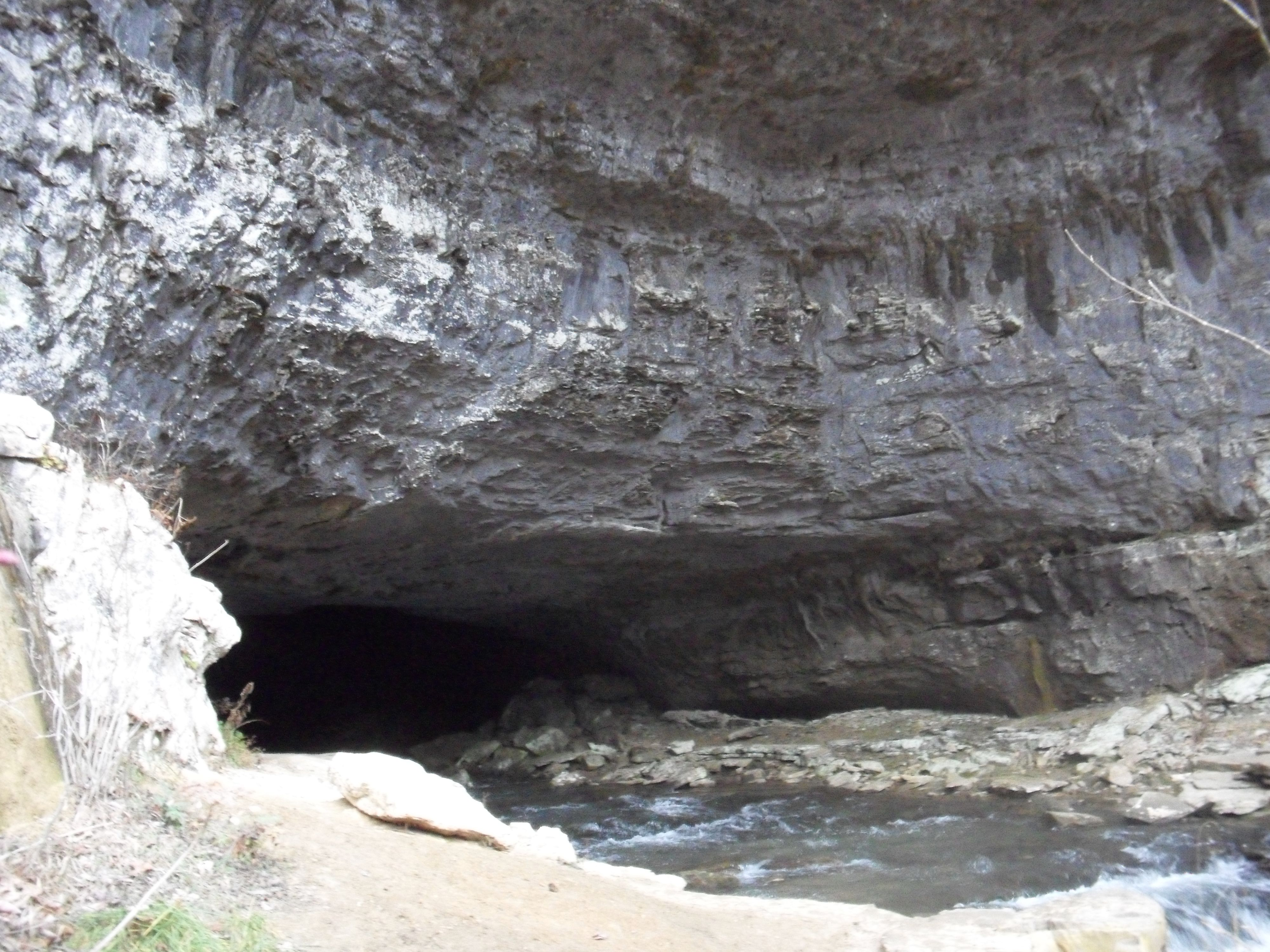
Lost Cove Cave

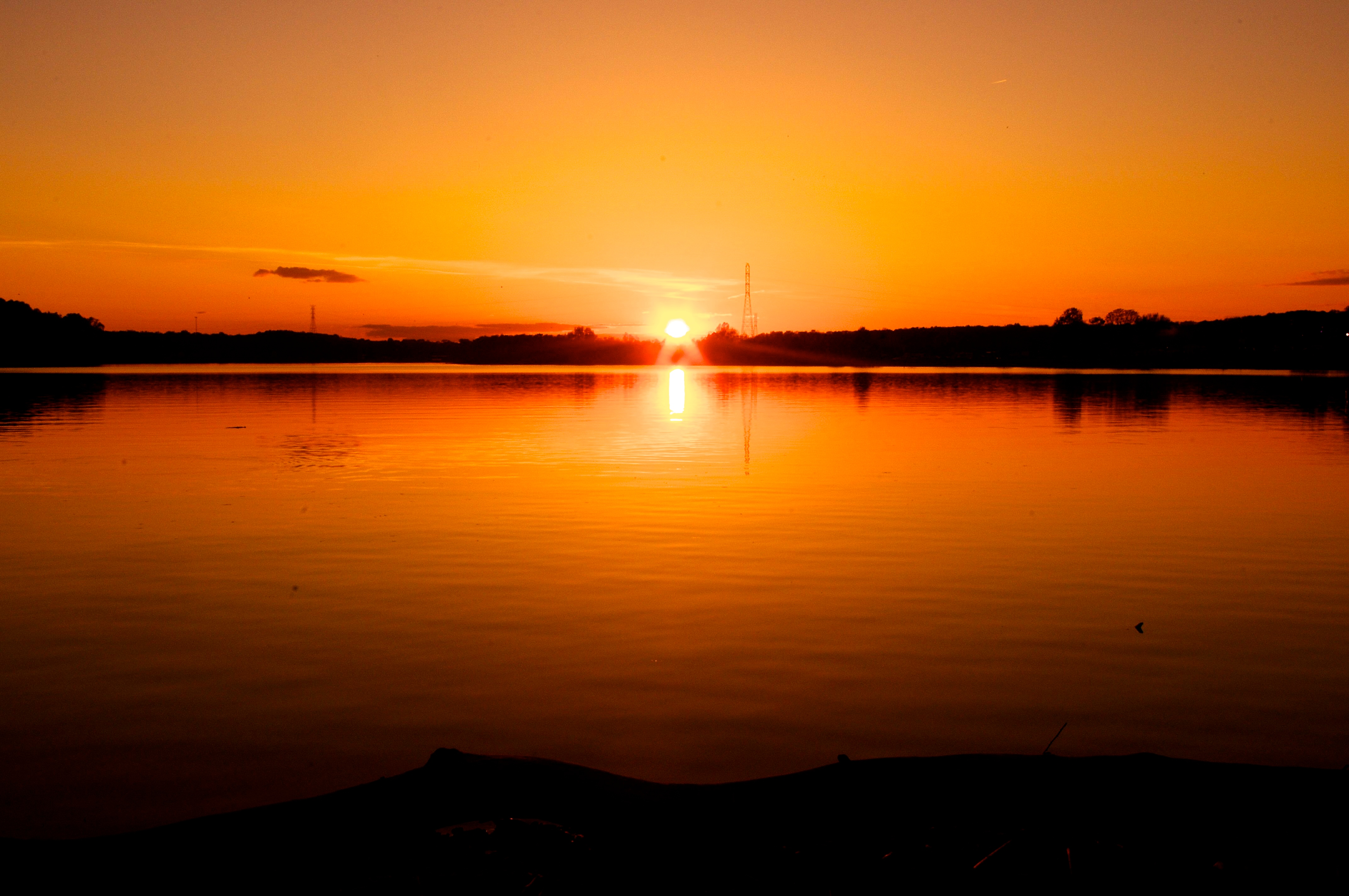
Tims Ford Lake

According to the U.S. Census Bureau, the county has a total area of 576 square miles (1,490 km^{2}), of which 555 square miles (1,440 km^{2}) is land and 21 square miles (54 km^{2}) (3.7%) is water.

Franklin is one of Tennessee's southern tier of counties and abuts the Alabama border. It has a varied geography, extending from the southeast corner of the Nashville Basin over the Highland Rim and up onto the Cumberland Plateau, for a difference in elevation of about 1,300 feet (400 m). The county is well watered and forested, and except for the steeper areas of the plateau is well suited for agriculture, having a long growing season and mild winters.

Sewanee Natural Bridge is a 25 feet (7.6 m) high natural sandstone arch with a span of 50 feet (15 m).

Lost Cove Cave, located near Sherwood, is in the Carter State Natural Area. One of its entrances is known as the Buggytop Cave Entrance and another entrance is known as the Peter Cave Entrance. The Buggytop Entrance is 100 feet (30 m) wide and 80 feet (24 m) high and opens at the base of an overhanging bluff 150 feet (46 m) high. The cave stream cascades down from the mouth and drops 40 feet (12 m) in less than 100 yards (91 m).

=== Adjacent counties ===
- Coffee County (north)
- Grundy County (northeast)
- Marion County (east)
- Jackson County, Alabama (south)
- Madison County, Alabama (southwest)
- Lincoln County (west)
- Moore County (northwest)

=== State protected areas ===
- Bear Hollow Wildlife Management Area
- Carter State Natural Area
- Franklin State Forest (part)
- Hawkins Cove State Natural Area
- Mingo Swamp Wildlife Management Area
- Natural Bridge State Natural Area
- Owl Hollow Mill Wildlife Management Area
- South Cumberland State Park (part)
- Tims Ford State Park
- Walls of Jericho State Natural Area

=== Other protected areas ===
- Tims Ford Lake
- Woods Reservoir

== Demographics ==
Historical population
Census	Pop.	Note	%±
1810	5,730		—
1820	16,571		189.2%
1830	15,620		−5.7%
1840	12,033		−23.0%
1850	13,768		14.4%
1860	13,848		0.6%
1870	14,970		8.1%
1880	17,178		14.7%
1890	18,929		10.2%
1900	20,392		7.7%
1910	20,491		0.5%
1920	20,641		0.7%
1930	21,796		5.6%
1940	23,892		9.6%
1950	25,431		6.4%
1960	25,528		0.4%
1970	27,244		6.7%
1980	31,983		17.4%
1990	34,725		8.6%
2000	39,270		13.1%
2010	41,052		4.5%
2020	42,774		4.2%
2025 (est.)	45,579	▲	6.6%
U.S. Decennial Census; 1790-1960 1900-1990; 1990-2000 2010-2014

=== 2020 census ===
As of the 2020 census, the county had a population of 42,774 residents, a median age of 43.6 years, 19.6% of residents under the age of 18, and 21.1% aged 65 or older; there were 96.6 males for every 100 females overall and 94.8 males for every 100 females age 18 and over.

32.1% of residents lived in urban areas while 67.9% lived in rural areas.

There were 16,814 households in the county, of which 27.4% had children under the age of 18 living in them. Of all households, 50.9% were married-couple households, 17.8% were households with a male householder and no spouse or partner present, and 25.3% were households with a female householder and no spouse or partner present. About 26.8% of all households were made up of individuals and 13.1% had someone living alone who was 65 years of age or older.

There were 19,395 housing units, of which 13.3% were vacant. Among occupied housing units, 75.8% were owner-occupied and 24.2% were renter-occupied. The homeowner vacancy rate was 1.6% and the rental vacancy rate was 6.3%.

The racial makeup of the county was 87.1% White, 4.6% Black or African American, 0.4% American Indian and Alaska Native, 0.8% Asian, less than 0.1% Native Hawaiian and Pacific Islander, 2.1% from some other race, and 5.0% from two or more races, while Hispanic or Latino residents of any race comprised 3.5% of the population.

Franklin County racial composition
Race	Number	Percentage
White (non-Hispanic)	36,864	86.18%
Black or African American (non-Hispanic)	1,962	4.59%
Native American	117	0.27%
Asian	348	0.81%
Pacific Islander	17	0.04%
Other/Mixed	1,964	4.59%
Hispanic or Latino	1,502	3.51%

=== 2000 census ===
As of the census of 2000, there were 39,270 people, 15,003 households, and 11,162 families residing in the county. The population density was 71 inhabitants per square mile (27/km^{2}).

There were 16,813 housing units at an average density of 30 per square mile (12/km^{2}). The racial makeup of the county was 92.20% White or European American, 5.49% Black or African American, 0.20% Native American, 0.41% Asian, 0.03% Pacific Islander, 0.60% from other races, and 1.06% from two or more races. 1.58% of the population were Hispanic or Latino of any race.

In the county, the population was spread out, with 23.00% under the age of 18, 10.90% from 18 to 24, 26.40% from 25 to 44, 24.40% from 45 to 64, and 15.20% who were 65 years of age or older. The median age was 38 years. For every 100 females, there were 94.80 males. For every 100 females age 18 and over, there were 92.80 males.

The median income for a household in the county was $36,044, and the median income for a family was $42,279. Males had a median income of $31,506 versus $21,479 for females. The per capita income for the county was $17,987. About 9.60% of families and 13.20% of the population were below the poverty line, including 17.00% of those under age 18 and 13.00% of those age 65 or over.

== Communities ==
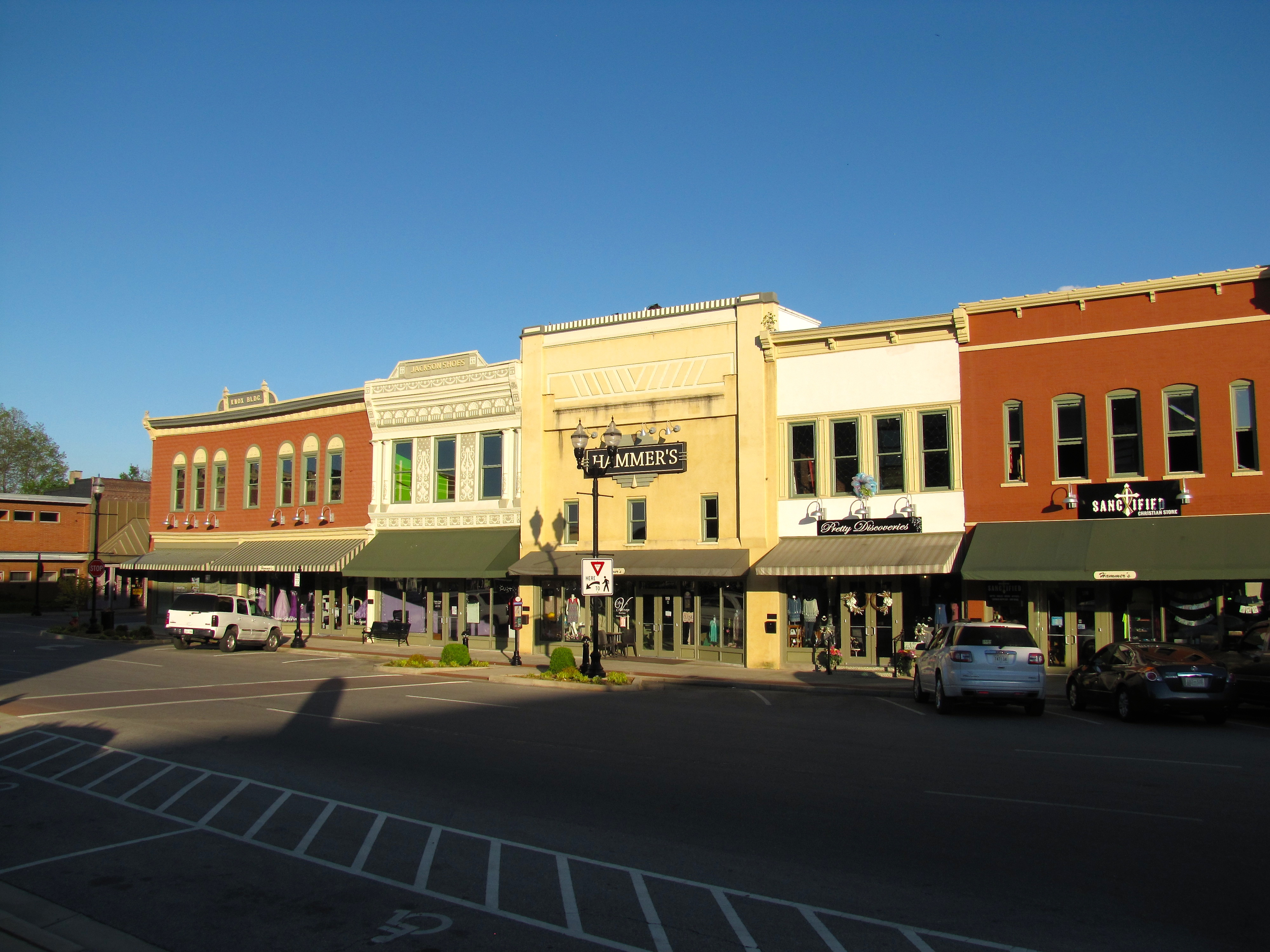
Winchester

=== Cities ===
- Cowan
- Decherd
- Tullahoma (partial)
- Winchester (county seat)

=== Towns ===
- Estill Springs
- Huntland
- Monteagle (also in Marion and Grundy Counties)

=== Census-designated places ===
- Belvidere
- Sewanee
- Sherwood

=== Unincorporated communities ===
- Alto
- Asia
- Beech Hill
- Broadview
- Midway
- Shady Grove

== Notable people ==
- Stephen Adams (1807–1857), United States Senator and Representative
- James Patton Anderson, (1822–1873), born in Franklin County, Confederate Army general
- Jimmy Bedford (1940–2009), sixth master distiller at Jack Daniel's
- Phillip Fulmer (b. 1950), former head coach of the Tennessee Volunteers football team
- Bernie Moore (1895–1967), commissioner of the Southeastern Conference
- Dinah Shore (1916–1994), singer, actress, and television celebrity
- John Templeton (1912–2008), investor and philanthropist
- Jauan Jennings (b. 1997), Wide Receiver for the San Francisco 49ers
- Shirley Majors (1913–1981), former head coach of The Sewanee Tigers football team

== Politics ==
Franklin County has become a Republican stronghold in recent years. The last Democrat to carry this county was Al Gore in 2000. Prior to 2004, the only Republican to win the county in a 20th-century presidential election was Richard Nixon in 1972. Despite this, the area around Sewanee remains Democratic, like other college towns.

United States presidential election results for Franklin County, Tennessee
Year	Republican		Democratic		Third party(ies)	
Year	No.	%	No.	%	No.	%
1912	370	13.51%	2,172	79.33%	196	7.16%
1916	711	21.98%	2,469	76.32%	55	1.70%
1920	1,558	30.77%	3,504	69.19%	2	0.04%
1924	707	24.92%	2,072	73.03%	58	2.04%
1928	928	35.26%	1,698	64.51%	6	0.23%
1932	360	10.54%	3,029	88.65%	28	0.82%
1936	519	12.76%	3,534	86.92%	13	0.32%
1940	569	11.63%	4,312	88.13%	12	0.25%
1944	600	13.12%	3,958	86.55%	15	0.33%
1948	589	13.20%	2,948	66.08%	924	20.71%
1952	2,015	29.48%	4,786	70.03%	33	0.48%
1956	1,727	26.19%	4,791	72.65%	77	1.17%
1960	2,041	28.59%	5,041	70.61%	57	0.80%
1964	2,262	27.28%	6,029	72.72%	0	0.00%
1968	1,700	18.62%	2,489	27.27%	4,939	54.11%
1972	4,136	57.51%	2,896	40.27%	160	2.22%
1976	2,619	27.50%	6,788	71.27%	117	1.23%
1980	3,995	36.02%	6,760	60.96%	335	3.02%
1984	5,705	49.09%	5,846	50.31%	70	0.60%
1988	5,381	49.43%	5,442	49.99%	63	0.58%
1992	4,507	31.79%	7,773	54.83%	1,896	13.37%
1996	5,296	39.58%	6,929	51.79%	1,154	8.63%
2000	6,560	44.65%	7,828	53.28%	303	2.06%
2004	9,129	53.46%	7,800	45.68%	148	0.87%
2008	10,539	60.46%	6,613	37.94%	280	1.61%
2012	10,262	63.66%	5,603	34.76%	254	1.58%
2016	11,532	70.30%	4,374	26.66%	498	3.04%
2020	13,987	73.11%	4,864	25.42%	281	1.47%
2024	15,016	76.12%	4,529	22.96%	183	0.93%

== See also ==
- Franklin County High School
- National Register of Historic Places listings in Franklin County, Tennessee
