= Winchester, Tennessee =

- City
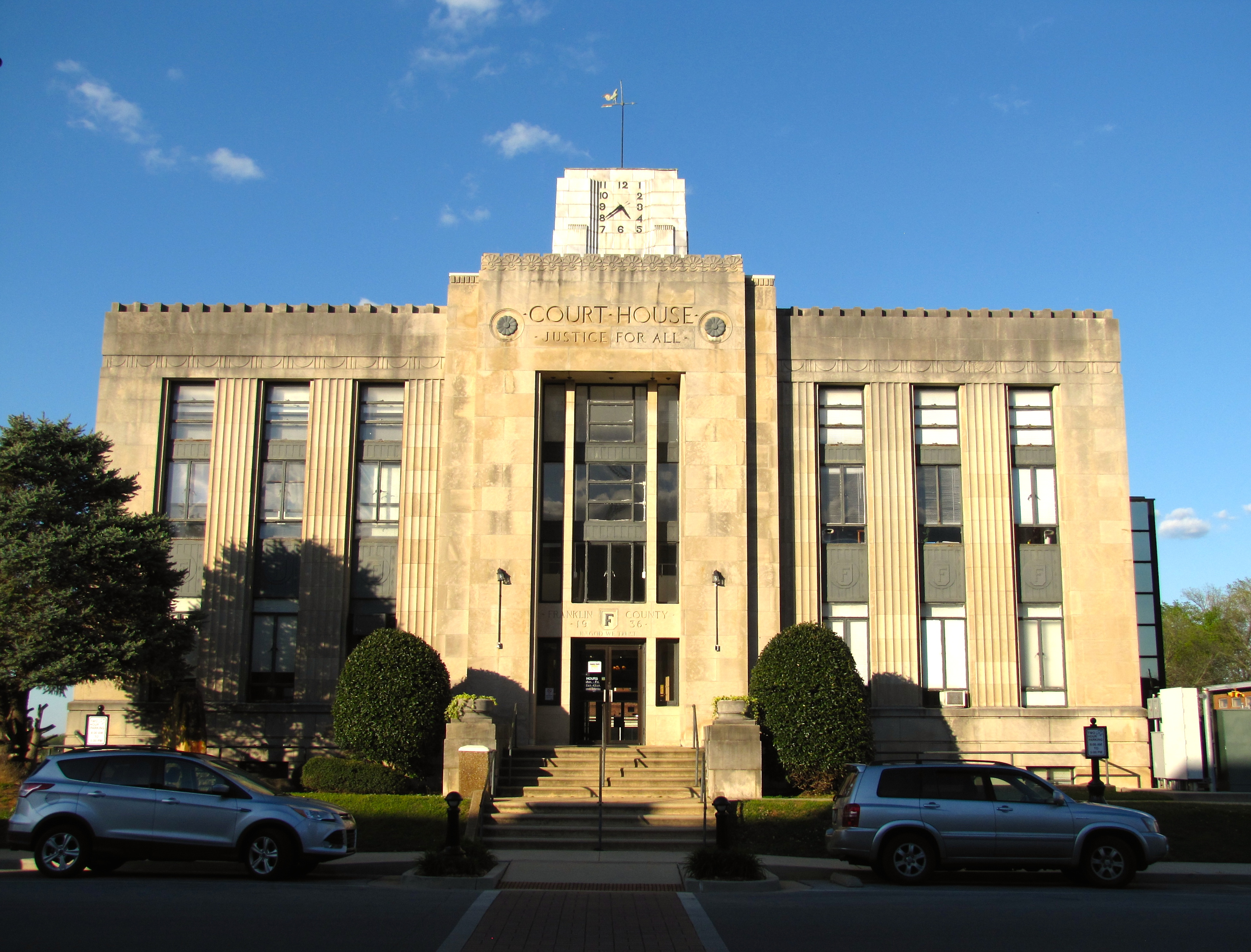
- Franklin County Courthouse in Winchester

- Location of Winchester in Franklin County, Tennessee.
- Coordinates: 35°11′18″N 86°6′45″W
- Country: United States
- State: Tennessee
- County: Franklin
- Established: 1810
- Incorporated: 1821
- Named for: James Winchester

Area
  - Total: 11.71 sq mi (30.33 km^{2})
  - Land: 10.73 sq mi (27.78 km^{2})
  - Water: 0.98 sq mi (2.55 km^{2})
- Elevation: 974 ft (297 m)

Population (2020)
  - Total: 9,375
  - Density: 874/sq mi (337.5/km^{2})
- Time zone: UTC-6 (Central (CST))
  - Summer (DST): UTC-5 (CDT)
- ZIP code: 37398
- Area code: 931
- FIPS code: 47-81080
- GNIS feature ID: 1274848
- Website: www.winchester-tn.com

Winchester is a city in and the county seat of Franklin County, Tennessee, United States. It is part of the Winchester micropolitan area. The population of Winchester as of the 2020 census was 9,375.

== History ==
Winchester was created as the seat of justice for Franklin County by act of the Tennessee Legislature on November 22, 1809, and was laid out the following year. The town is named for James Winchester, a soldier in the American Revolution, first Speaker of the Tennessee Legislature, and a brigadier general in the War of 1812, though he never lived in Winchester. The historic Hundred Oaks Castle is located in Winchester.

Mary Sharp College (originally the "Tennessee and Alabama Female Institute", but later renamed in honor of Mary Corn Sharp, a donor) was founded in 1851 by Z. C. Graves and the Baptist Church. Though a women's college, it offered a classical curriculum based upon what was being offered at the time by Amherst College, Brown University, and the University of Virginia. It closed in 1896. During the 19th century, the institution helped make Winchester an educational center. Other private schools in the city were Carrick Academy for male students (founded in 1809), Winchester Female Academy (founded in 1835), and Winchester Normal College.

The city was occupied first by Confederate and then by Union troops during the Civil War. Winchester, along with the rest of Franklin County, seceded from the Union several months before the rest of Tennessee, unofficially becoming a part of Alabama until the rest of the state seceded. It lay on the line of retreat to Chattanooga followed by the Confederate Army of Tennessee during the campaign of 1863.

Recreation in Winchester received a significant boost when the Tennessee Valley Authority started construction of the Tims Ford Dam along the Elk River in 1966. The project was completed in 1972, and Tims Ford Lake is now known for excellent boating and bass fishing opportunities. Tims Ford State Park is located along the lake's shoreline.

== Geography ==
Winchester is situated slightly north of the center of Franklin County in Tennessee. It shares a border to the north with the city of Decherd.The city center is located just south of Boiling Fork Creek, which has become an extension of Tims Ford Lake. On the western boundary of the city, Dry Creek forms another arm of the lake. The city limits of Winchester extend as far as the Elk River arm of the lake, approximately 4 miles (6 km) north of downtown.

U.S. Route 41A passes through the center of town, coming in from the southeast as South College Street and leaving to the northeast as Dinah Shore Boulevard. US 41A leads east 6 miles (10 km) to Cowan and 12 miles (19 km) to Sewanee, as well as north 6 miles (10 km) to Estill Springs and 14 miles (23 km) to Tullahoma. Tennessee State Route 16 leaves southwest from the center of town as 1st Avenue and leads 19 miles (31 km) to the Alabama border. U.S. Route 64 bypasses Winchester to the south and east, leading northeast 16 miles (26 km) to Interstate 24 near Pelham and west 32 miles (51 km) to Fayetteville. Tennessee State Route 50 leads west and northwest from Winchester 20 miles (32 km) to Lynchburg, and Tennessee State Route 130 leads northwest 6 miles (10 km) to Winchester Springs and 16 miles (26 km) to Tullahoma.

According to the United States Census Bureau, the city has a total area of 11.7 square miles (30.3 km^{2}), of which 10.7 square miles (27.8 km^{2}) is land and 1.0 square mile (2.6 km^{2}), or 8.47%, is water.

=== Climate ===
Climate data for Winchester, Tennessee (5 miles southeast) (1991–2020 normals, extremes 1985–2023)
Month	Jan	Feb	Mar	Apr	May	Jun	Jul	Aug	Sep	Oct	Nov	Dec	Year
Record high °F (°C)	77 (25)	80 (27)	86 (30)	89 (32)	95 (35)	104 (40)	105 (41)	103 (39)	99 (37)	94 (34)	86 (30)	76 (24)	105 (41)
Mean daily maximum °F (°C)	48.9 (9.4)	53.1 (11.7)	61.4 (16.3)	70.8 (21.6)	78.1 (25.6)	84.6 (29.2)	87.3 (30.7)	87.1 (30.6)	82.0 (27.8)	72.0 (22.2)	60.5 (15.8)	51.8 (11.0)	69.8 (21.0)
Daily mean °F (°C)	39.5 (4.2)	43.1 (6.2)	50.5 (10.3)	59.1 (15.1)	67.1 (19.5)	74.4 (23.6)	77.6 (25.3)	76.8 (24.9)	71.0 (21.7)	60.2 (15.7)	49.2 (9.6)	42.4 (5.8)	59.2 (15.1)
Mean daily minimum °F (°C)	30.2 (−1.0)	33.1 (0.6)	39.7 (4.3)	47.4 (8.6)	56.1 (13.4)	64.1 (17.8)	67.9 (19.9)	66.4 (19.1)	60.0 (15.6)	48.5 (9.2)	38.0 (3.3)	33.1 (0.6)	48.7 (9.3)
Record low °F (°C)	−2 (−19)	4 (−16)	8 (−13)	22 (−6)	31 (−1)	44 (7)	52 (11)	48 (9)	36 (2)	23 (−5)	13 (−11)	−5 (−21)	−5 (−21)
Average precipitation inches (mm)	4.78 (121)	5.40 (137)	5.76 (146)	5.06 (129)	4.77 (121)	5.20 (132)	4.68 (119)	3.91 (99)	4.27 (108)	3.43 (87)	4.66 (118)	5.75 (146)	57.67 (1,465)
Average snowfall inches (cm)	1.4 (3.6)	1.0 (2.5)	1.0 (2.5)	0.0 (0.0)	0.0 (0.0)	0.0 (0.0)	0.0 (0.0)	0.0 (0.0)	0.0 (0.0)	0.0 (0.0)	0.0 (0.0)	0.7 (1.8)	4.1 (10)
Average precipitation days (≥ 0.01 in)	11.5	11.9	12.0	10.8	11.3	12.1	11.2	9.7	7.9	8.0	9.4	12.4	128.2
Average snowy days (≥ 0.1 in)	1.1	1.3	0.7	0.0	0.0	0.0	0.0	0.0	0.0	0.0	0.0	0.6	3.7
Source: NOAA

== Demographics ==
Historical population
Census	Pop.	Note	%±
1880	1,039		—
1890	1,313		26.4%
1900	1,338		1.9%
1910	1,351		1.0%
1920	2,203		63.1%
1930	2,210		0.3%
1940	2,760		24.9%
1950	3,974		44.0%
1960	4,760		19.8%
1970	5,256		10.4%
1980	5,821		10.7%
1990	6,305		8.3%
2000	7,329		16.2%
2010	8,530		16.4%
2020	9,375		9.9%

=== 2020 census ===
As of the 2020 census, Winchester had a population of 9,375. The median age was 43.8 years, 20.1% of residents were under the age of 18, and 22.7% of residents were 65 years of age or older. For every 100 females there were 90.0 males, and for every 100 females age 18 and over there were 88.3 males age 18 and over.

There were 3,847 households in Winchester, of which 28.0% had children under the age of 18 living in them. Of all households, 43.0% were married-couple households, 18.2% were households with a male householder and no spouse or partner present, and 32.1% were households with a female householder and no spouse or partner present. About 29.8% of all households were made up of individuals and 13.6% had someone living alone who was 65 years of age or older.

There were 4,283 housing units, of which 10.2% were vacant. The homeowner vacancy rate was 2.5% and the rental vacancy rate was 6.4%.

93.1% of residents lived in urban areas, while 6.9% lived in rural areas.

Racial composition as of the 2020 census
Race	Number	Percent
White	7,543	80.5%
Black or African American	921	9.8%
American Indian and Alaska Native	36	0.4%
Asian	131	1.4%
Native Hawaiian and Other Pacific Islander	4	0.0%
Some other race	254	2.7%
Two or more races	486	5.2%
Hispanic or Latino (of any race)	437	4.7%

=== Business data ===
The number of businesses employing people was 268 as of 2017.

=== 2000 census ===
As of the census of 2000, there was a population of 7,329, with 2,992 households and 2,013 families residing in the city. The population density was 734.6 inhabitants per square mile (283.6/km^{2}). There were 3,318 housing units at an average density of 332.6 per square mile (128.4/km^{2}). The racial makeup of the city was 84.51% White, 12.35% African American, 0.22% Native American, 0.52% Asian, 0.05% Pacific Islander, 1.23% from other races, and 1.12% from two or more races. Hispanic or Latino of any race were 2.25% of the population.

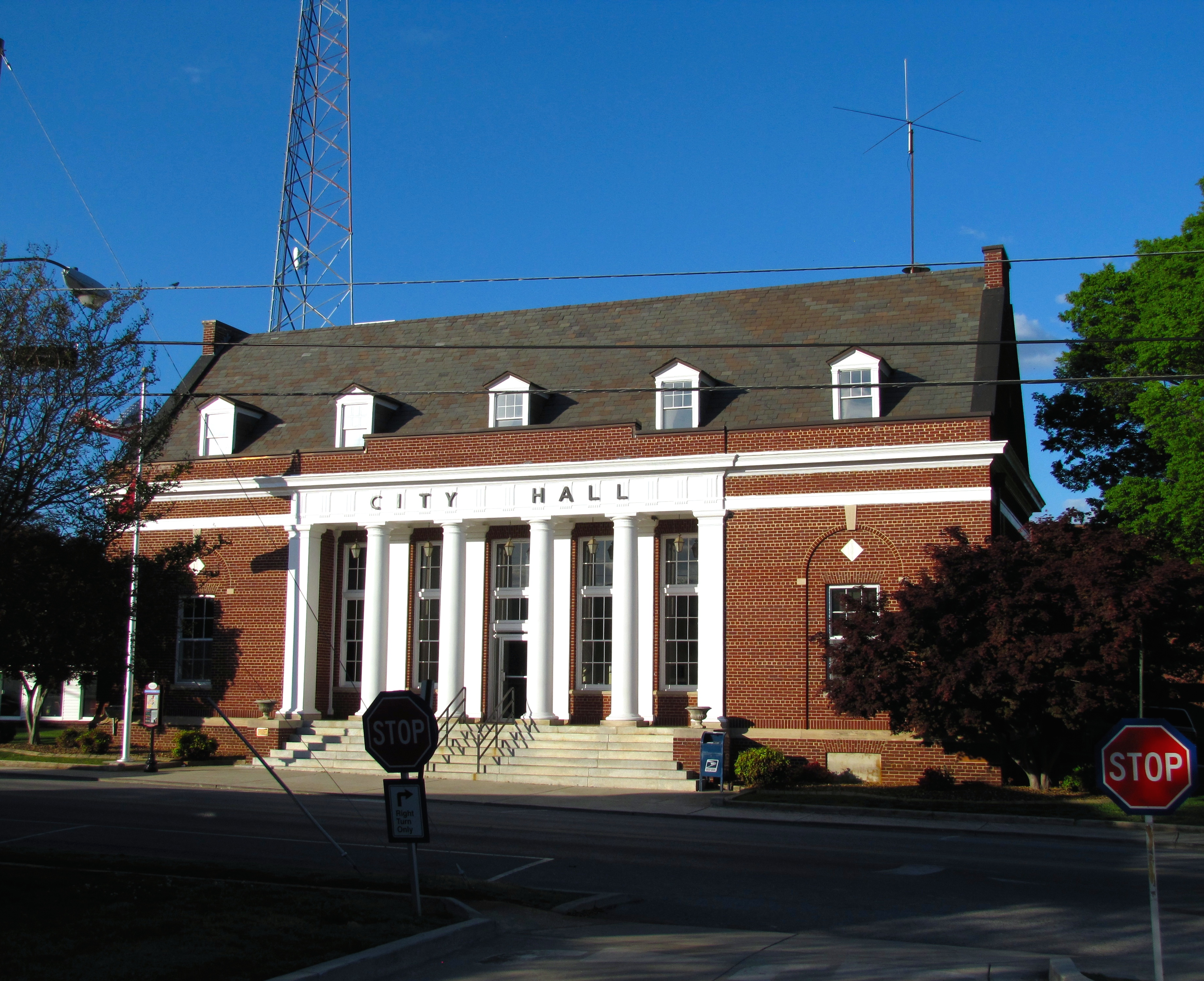
Winchester City Hall

There were 2,992 households, out of which 27.5% had children under the age of 18 living with them, 50.2% were married couples living together, 13.7% had a female householder with no husband present, and 32.7% were non-families. 29.2% of all households were made up of individuals, and 14.6% had someone living alone who was 65 years of age or older. The average household size was 2.36 and the average family size was 2.89.

In the city, the population was spread out, with 22.6% under the age of 18, 8.0% from 18 to 24, 25.8% from 25 to 44, 24.0% from 45 to 64, and 19.6% who were 65 years of age or older. The median age was 40 years. For every 100 females, there were 83.8 males. For every 100 females age 18 and over, there were 81.7 males.

The median income for a household in the city was $32,500, and the median income for a family was $41,183. Males had a median income of $31,959 versus $21,629 for females. The per capita income for the city was $16,533. About 13.3% of families and 19.9% of the population were below the poverty line, including 28.6% of those under age 18 and 19.4% of those age 65 or over.

== Arts and culture ==
The High On The Hog Festival, founded in 1987, is a barbecue festival occurring each May.

== Infrastructure ==
Winchester is served by the Winchester Municipal Airport.

== Notable people ==
Notable citizens of Winchester have included four governors of Tennessee:

- Isham G. Harris
- Henry Horton
- Albert Smith Marks
- Peter Turney

Three natives of the city have been formally honored by the British Crown:

- Francis Joseph Campbell (1832–1914), anti-slavery campaigner and pioneer in educating the blind
- Ida Beasly Elliott (1864–1948), missionary in Burma
- John Templeton, financier and philanthropist

Winchester was also the birthplace and/or residency of:

- Reuben Davis, a U.S. congressman from Mississippi
- Brian Dayett, New York Yankees/Chicago Cubs Major League Baseball player
- Mike Farris, recording artist, formerly of the Screamin' Cheetah Wheelies
- Phillip Fulmer, former University of Tennessee football coach
- Jeff Hall, former University of Tennessee placekicker
- Tracy Hayworth, Detroit Lions football player
- Jeremy Nunley, football player
- Dinah Shore, singer and TV personality
