= Tennessee State Route 10 =

Highway in Tennessee

State Route 10
- SR 10; primary in red, unsigned in green

Route information
- Maintained by TDOT
- Length: 130.9 mi (210.7 km)
- Existed: October 1, 1923–present

Major junctions
- South end: US 231 / US 431 / SR 1 at the Alabama State Line near Park City
- US 64 / SR 50 in Fayetteville; US 41A in Shelbyville; SR 437 in Shelbyville; I-24 in Murfreesboro; US 41 / US 70S / SR 99 in Murfreesboro; I-40 in Lebanon; US 70 in Lebanon; US 231 / SR 25 east of Castalian Springs; SR 25 east of Hartsville; SR 52 in Lafayette
- North end: KY 99 at the Kentucky State Line near Lafayette

Location
- Country: United States
- State: Tennessee
- Counties: Lincoln, Moore, Bedford, Rutherford, Wilson, Trousdale, Macon

Highway system
- Tennessee State Routes; Interstate; US; State
← SR 9	→ US 11

State Route 10 (SR 10) is a south–north route from the Alabama state line in Lincoln County to the Kentucky state line in Macon County.

For most of the highway's length, it is an unsigned designation for US 231.

== Route description ==
=== Alabama to Shelbyville ===
SR 10 begins at the Alabama state line in Lincoln County, just north of Hazel Green, Alabama, where it is the unsigned companion route of US 231/US 431. The highway then goes north through farmland and countryside and has an intersection with SR 275 before going through Park City and crossing a ridge into Fayetteville. Once in Fayetteville, it has a Y-intersection with SR 110 before going through a major business and coming to an intersection with US 64 Bypass (US 64 Byp.). Here, US 431 continues straight into downtown while US 231/SR 10 turns east to follow US 64 Byp. to the south. It then curves to the north before coming to an intersection with US 64/SR 15/SR 50, where US 64 Byp. ends separate and US 231/SR 10 continues north through some farmland before climbing on top of Chestnut Ridge to cross into Moore County.

US 231/SR 10 then intersects and has a short concurrency with SR 129 as it straddles the Lincoln–Moore County before crossing into Bedford County. The route then lowers down off Chestnut Ridge and goes through more farmland and has a crossing of the Duck River before entering Shelbyville. It first goes through some suburbs before having a Y-intersection and running concurrently with SR 64/SR 130 and entering downtown. SR 64/SR 130 then separates and turns east at an intersection with SR 82/SR 387 (Lane Parkway), and SR 82 joins the concurrency before curving to the east and then turning north again to have an intersection with US 41A/SR 16. US 231/SR 10/SR 82 then passes through the northern part of town and some suburbs before having an interchange with SR 437 (Shelbyville Bypass). It also passes by Bomar Field, Shelbyville's airport, before leaving Shelbyville. The highway then passes just east of Fosterville before SR 82 separates and goes east, while US 231/SR 10 heads north through more farmland and eventually crosses into Rutherford County.

=== Rutherford County ===
It then crosses a ridge and passes through Christiana to an intersection and short concurrency with SR 269 before crossing another ridge and entering Murfreesboro. US 231/SR 10 first goes through a suburban area with a few businesses before having an interchange with I-24. The highway then goes north through a major business district before having a Y-intersection running concurrently with US 41/US 70S/SR 1/SR 99 and entering downtown. It then passes through downtown before coming to an intersection with SR 96, where SR 99 turns southwest to follow SR 96, US 41/US 70S/SR 1 continues north, and US 231/SR 10 turns northeast to run concurrently with SR 96. It begins passing through suburbs as SR 96 separates and turns east. US 231/SR 10 then has an intersection with SR 268 before passing by the VA hospital before leaving Murfreesboro soon after. It then passes through Walterhill and has an X-intersection with SR 266 before going through farmland again and crossing into Wilson County.

=== Wilson and western Trousdale Counties ===
US 231/SR 10 then immediately has an intersection with SR 452 (Bill France Boulevard), which provides access to Nashville Superspeedway and I-840, before passing right through the middle of Cedars of Lebanon State Park. It then immediately has an intersection with SR 265 before passing through more farmland and by a rock quarry before entering Lebanon just south of the I-40 interchange. It then has an interchange with I-40 and goes through a major business district, paralleling SR 266, before entering downtown and having an intersection with US 70 Bus./SR 24. US 231/SR 10 then continues north through downtown and has an intersection with US 70/SR 26 before going through some suburbs before leaving Lebanon. It then crosses over the Cumberland River at Hunter's Point to enter Trousdale County. It then passes through more farmland until near the small community of Castalian Springs, where it comes to an intersection with SR 25.

=== Trousdale and Macon Counties: SR 10 as a signed highway ===
At US 231's junction with SR 25, SR 10 becomes signed for the first time as a primary highway and leaves US 231 to go east concurrently with SR 25 while US 231 continues north concurrently with its new companion route, SR 376. It goes through farmland all the way to Hartsville, where it has an intersection and short concurrency with SR 141 before passing just north of downtown. It then goes by a few subdivisions and two schools before leaving Hartsville, and SR 10 then separates from SR 25 to head north shortly afterwards. SR 10 travels alone for the first time as it goes north to cross into Macon County.

It then passes down a long narrow valley before coming to an intersection with SR 52 just south of Lafayette. SR 10 then enters Lafayette and goes through downtown before having an intersection with SR 261. It then passes through a suburb before leaving Lafayette and traveling through farmland again all the way to the Kentucky border, where SR 10 ends and continues into Allen County as KY 99, which has an intersection with KY 1578 just across the state line.

== History ==
State Route 10 was established as part of Tennessee's original state highway system on October 1, 1923. The route was part of Tennessee's early effort to create a connected statewide highway network during the expansion of automobile travel in the early 20th century.

Following the creation of the United States Numbered Highway System in 1926, portions of the SR 10 corridor became part of U.S. Route 231. As the U.S. Highway System developed, US 231 became the primary signed route along much of the corridor, while SR 10 remained as a state route designation concurrent with US 231.

Historic Tennessee highway maps show the continued presence of SR 10 and its concurrent sections with US 231 as the state's highway system evolved throughout the 20th century. Today, SR 10 remains signed between the US 231/SR 25 junction in Trousdale County and the Kentucky state line near Lafayette, while most of the remaining route is an unsigned designation concurrent with US 231.

== Major intersections ==
County	Location	mi	km	Destinations	Notes
Alabama state line		0.0	0.0	Southern end of US 231/431 concurrency; Southern terminus of unsigned SR 10; US 231 / US 431 continues south into Alabama; Northern terminus of unsigned SR 1	
Lincoln	Park City	2.3	3.7	SR 275 east (Lincoln Road) – Flintville	Western terminus of SR 275
Lincoln	Fayetteville	9.0	14.5	SR 110 west (Ardmore Highway) – Kirkland, Taft, Ardmore	Eastern terminus of SR 110
Lincoln	Fayetteville	10.5	16.9	US 431 north (Main Avenue S/SR 273 west) / US 64 Byp. (Wilson Parkway/Thornton Taylor Parkway) – downtown, Petersburg, Lewisburg, Pulaski	Northern end of US 431 concurrency; southern end of US 64 Bypass concurrency; eastern terminus of unsigned SR 273
Lincoln	Fayetteville	12.1	19.5	US 64 / SR 50 (College Street/Winchester Highway/SR 15) – downtown, Pulaski, Lynchburg, Winchester	Eastern terminus of US 64 Bypass
Moore		24.7	39.8	SR 129 east (Charity Road) – Lynchburg	Southern end of SR 129 concurrency
Moore		25.0	40.2	SR 129 west (Petersburg-Chestnut Ridge Road) – Petersburg	Northern end of SR 129 concurrency
Bedford	Shelbyville	36.5	58.7	SR 64 west / SR 130 west (Lewis Avenue) – Bedford	Southern end of SR 64/SR 130 concurrency
Bedford	Shelbyville	37.3	60.0	US 231 Bus. north (N Cannon Boulevard) / US 231 north (Lane Parkway/SR 387 north) / SR 64 east / SR 130 east (Lane Parkway) – Wartrace, Tullahoma	Northern end of US 231/SR 64/SR 130 concurrency; southern terminus of US 231 Business and unsigned SR 387; southern end of US 231 Business concurrency
Bedford	Shelbyville	37.6	60.5	SR 82 south (N Main Street) – Lynchburg	Southern end of SR 82 concurrency
Bedford	Shelbyville	37.7	60.7	US 41A (Elm Street/Madison Street/SR 16) – Unionville, Eagleville, Tullahoma	
Bedford	Shelbyville	38.1	61.3	US 231 south (Colloredo Boulevard/SR 387 south)	Northern terminus of US 231 Business and unsigned SR 387; southern end of US 231 concurrency
Bedford	Shelbyville	40.3	64.9	SR 437 east (Shelbyville Bypass)	Interchange; western terminus of SR 437
Bedford		44.5	71.6	SR 82 north (Webb Highway) – Bell Buckle	Northern end of SR 82 concurrency
Rutherford	Christiana	53.1	85.5	SR 269 east – Christiana, Bell Buckle, Wartrace	Southern end of SR 269 concurrency
Rutherford	Christiana	53.5	86.1	SR 269 (Walnut Grove Road) – Rockvale, Eagleville	Northern end of SR 269 concurrency
Rutherford	Murfreesboro	59.9– 60.2	96.4– 96.9	I-24 – Nashville, Chattanooga	I-24 exit 81
Rutherford	Murfreesboro	62.2	100.1	US 41 south (Broad Street/SR 1 east/SR 99 east) / US 70S east – Manchester, Woodbury, Bradyville	Southern end of US 41/US 70S/SR 1/SR 99 concurrency
Rutherford	Murfreesboro	62.8	101.1	US 41 north / US 70S west (Broad Street/SR 1 west) / SR 96 west (Old Fort Parkway/SR 99 west) – Smyrna, Franklin, Eagleville	Northern end of US 41/US 70S/SR 1/SR 99 concurrency; southern end of SR 96 concurrency
Rutherford	Murfreesboro	63.8	102.7	SR 96 east (E Clark Boulevard) – Lascassas, Auburntown, Liberty	Northern end of SR 96 concurrency
Rutherford	Murfreesboro	67.2	108.1	SR 268 (W Thompson Street/Compton Street)	
Rutherford	Walterhill	69.9	112.5	SR 266 (Jefferson Pike) – Smyrna, Lascassas	
Wilson		75.0	120.7	SR 452 west (Bill France Boulevard) – Nashville Superspeedway	Eastern terminus of SR 452
Wilson		80.7	129.9	SR 265 (Central Pike/Chicken Road) – Hermitage, Watertown	
Wilson	Lebanon	86.4– 86.6	139.0– 139.4	I-40 – Nashville, Knoxville	I-40 exit 238
Wilson	Lebanon	88.3	142.1	US 70 Bus. (Main Street/SR 24)	
Wilson	Lebanon	88.6	142.6	US 70 (High Street/SR 26) – Watertown, Mount Juliet	
Trousdale		101.1	162.7	US 231 north (Hunters Point Pike/SR 376 north) / SR 25 west (Hartsville Pike) – Westmoreland, Gallatin	Northern end of US 231 concurrency; southern terminus of unsigned SR 376; southern end of SR 25 concurrency; SR 10 becomes signed as a primary highway
Trousdale	Hartsville	106.6	171.6	SR 141 north (Green Cove Road) – Westmoreland	Southern end of SR 141 concurrency
Trousdale	Hartsville	106.9	172.0	SR 141 south (Broadway) – downtown, Lebanon	Northern end of SR 141 concurrency
Trousdale	Hartsville	109.7	176.5	SR 25 east (Hartsville Pike) – Carthage	Northern end of SR 25 concurrency
Macon	Lafayette	121.1	194.9	SR 52 – Westmoreland, Red Boiling Springs	
Macon	Lafayette	121.6	195.7	SR 261 south (Red Boiling Springs Road) to SR 52	Southern end of SR 261 concurrency
Macon	Lafayette	122.2	196.7	SR 261 north (Galen Road) – Gamaliel, KY	Northern end of SR 261 concurrency
Macon	Lafayette	122.6	197.3	Akersville Road - north to Fountain Run, KY	
Macon		130.9	210.7	KY 99 north / KY 1578 north – Scottsville	Northern terminus at the Kentucky state line; continues as KY 99, with a junction with KY 1578 about 100 feet (30 m) north of the state line.
1.000 mi = 1.609 km; 1.000 km = 0.621 mi: Concurrency terminus

== Related routes ==
=== Tennessee State Route 10A ===
- Length: 7.9 mi (12.7 km)
- Existed: 1941?–1983

State Route 10A (SR 10A) was an alternate route of SR 10 that ran from the US 231/SR 10/SR 25 junction at Paynes Store, in western Trousdale County, to the US 31E/SR 6 junction in the northeastern Sumner County community of Bransford. It was re-designated as SR 376 as part of the 1983 Tennessee state highway renumbering.
