= U.S. Route 231 in Tennessee =

Section of U.S. Highway in Tennessee

U.S. Route 231
- US 231 in Tennessee highlighted in red

Route information
- Maintained by TDOT
- Length: 121.15 mi (194.97 km)

Major junctions
- South end: US 231 / US 431 at the Alabama state line near Park City
- US 64 / US 431 in Fayetteville; US 41A in Shelbyville; I-24 near Murfreesboro; US 41 / US 70S in Murfreesboro; I-40 near Lebanon; US 70 in Lebanon; US 31E in Bransford
- North end: US 31E / US 231 at the Kentucky state line near Westmoreland

Location
- Country: United States
- State: Tennessee
- Counties: Lincoln, Moore, Bedford, Rutherford, Wilson, Trousdale, Sumner

Highway system
- United States Numbered Highway System; List; Special; Divided; Tennessee State Routes; Interstate; US; State
← SR 230	US 231	→ SR 231
← SR 375	SR 376	→ SR 377
← SR 386	SR 387	→ SR 388

U.S. Route 231 (US 231) in Tennessee runs north–south for 121.15 miles (194.97 km), entirely in Middle Tennessee, that starts south of Fayetteville at the Alabama state line, and ends north of Westmoreland at the Kentucky state line. For the majority of its length, between the Alabama state line and Trousdale County, it is concurrent with unsigned State Route 10 (SR 10).

== Route description ==
=== Lincoln County ===
The highway begins at the Alabama state line in Lincoln County, just north of Hazel Green, Alabama, where it enters the state concurrent with SR 10 and US 431. They then go north through farmland and countryside and have an intersection with SR 275 before going through Park City (where the highway passes by Fayetteville Municipal Airport) and crossing a ridge into Fayetteville. Once in Fayetteville, they have a Y-intersection with SR 110 before going through a major business and crossing the Elk River to come to an intersection with US 64 Bypass. Here, US 431 continues straight into downtown (along unsigned SR 273) while US 231/SR 10 turns east to follow US 64 Bypass, bypassing downtown along its southside. The highway now curves to the north before coming to an intersection with US 64/SR 15/SR 50, where US 64 Bypass ends and US 231/SR 10 continue north through some farmland, passing through Belleville, before climbing on top of the Highland Rim to cross into Moore County.

=== Moore and Bedford Counties ===
US 231/SR 10 then intersect and have a short concurrency with SR 129 as it straddles the county line with Lincoln County before crossing into Bedford County. The route then lowers down into the Nashville Basin and goes through more farmland before entering Shelbyville, first going through some suburbs before having a Y-intersection and becoming concurrent with SR 64/SR 130 (Lewis Avenue), crossing the Duck River, and entering downtown. SR 64/SR 130 then separate and turn east along Lane Street at an intersection with SR 82/SR 387 (Lane Parkway), with SR 82 and SR 10 joining US 231 Business along N Cannon Boulevard and Main Street while US 231 and SR 387 bypass downtown along its western side, where it has an intersection with US 41A/SR 16 (Elm Street). The highway comes to an intersection with Main Street, where US 231 Business and SR 387 come to an end while US 231/SR 10/SR 82 rejoin and pass through the northern part of town and some suburbs before having an interchange with SR 437 (Shelbyville Bypass). They also pass by Bomar Field, Shelbyville's airport, before leaving Shelbyville. They then pass just east of Fosterville before SR 82 separates and goes east, while US 231/SR 10 head north through more farmland and eventually cross into Rutherford County.

=== Rutherford County ===
The highway immediately passes through Fosterville before crossing a ridge to pass through Christiana, where it has a short concurrency with SR 269, before crossing another ridge and entering Murfreesboro. US 231/SR 10 first go through a suburban area with a few businesses, where it crosses the Middle Fork of the Stones River, before having an interchange with I-24 (Exit 81). They then go north through a major business district before having a Y-intersection and becoming concurrent with US 41/US 70S/SR 1/SR 99 and entering downtown. They then pass through downtown before coming to an intersection with SR 96, where SR 99 turns southwest to follow SR 96, US 41/US 70S/SR 1 continue north, and US 231/SR 10 turn northeast to become concurrent with SR 96. They begin passing through suburbs as SR 96 separates and turns east. US 231/SR 10 pass by Murfreesboro Municipal Airport, and have an intersection with SR 268, before passing by the VA hospital and leaving Murfreesboro soon after. The highway then crosses the East Fork of the Stones River to pass through Walterhill, where it has an X-intersection with SR 266, before going through farmland again and crossing into Wilson County.

=== Wilson County ===
US 231/SR 10 then immediately have an intersection with SR 452 (Bill France Boulevard), which provides access to Nashville Superspeedway and I-840, before passing right through the middle of Cedars of Lebanon State Park. They then immediately have an intersection with SR 265 before passing through more farmland and by a rock quarry before entering Lebanon just south of the I-40 interchange. They then have an interchange I-40 and go through a major business district, paralleling SR 266, before entering downtown and having an intersection with US 70 BUS/SR 24. US 231/SR 10 then continue north through downtown and have an intersection with US 70/SR 26 before going through some suburbs before leaving Lebanon. They then cross over the Cumberland River at Hunter's Point to enter Trousdale County.

=== Trousdale County ===
They then pass through more farmland until near the small community of Castalian Springs, where they come to an intersection with SR 25. Here, SR 10 becomes signed for the first time as a primary highway and leaves US 231 to go east concurrent with SR 25 while US 231 continues north concurrent with its new companion route, SR 376. US 231/SR 376 head northward to have an intersection with SR 260 before crossing into Sumner County.

=== Sumner County ===
The highway immediately enters the mountains of the Highland Rim shortly before entering Bransford where SR 376 comes to an end and US 231 becomes concurrent with US 31E/SR 6. US 31E/US 231/SR 6 wind their way through some mountains for a few miles before exiting the Highland Rim to enter Westmoreland and immediately have an intersection with SR 52. The highway bypasses downtown along its east side before leaving Westmoreland and heading north through rural farmland for several mile to the Kentucky state line, where US 231/US 31E cross into that state while SR 6 comes to an end.

== History ==
In December 2020, the highway was shut down in the Wilson-Rutherford counties after a box truck had been playing an audio similar to what had been played from an RV before it detonated in Downtown Nashville. In suspicion of another potential bombing, the vehicle was searched for explosives.

Authorities later stated that no explosives were found inside the vehicle. The highway was later reopened.

== Junction list ==
County	Location	mi	km	Destinations	Notes
Alabama state line		0.0	0.0	US 231 south / US 431 south continue into Alabama; Begin concurrency with unsigned SR 10	
Lincoln	Park City	2.3	3.7	SR 275 east (Lincoln Road) – Flintville	Western terminus of SR 275
Lincoln	Park City	4.8	7.7	Airport Road - Fayetteville Municipal Airport	
Lincoln	Fayetteville	9.2	14.8	SR 110 west (Ardmore Highway) – Kirkland, Taft, Ardmore	Eastern terminus of SR 110
Lincoln	Fayetteville	10.7	17.2	Bridge over the Elk River	
Lincoln	Fayetteville	11.8	19.0	US 431 north (Main Avenue S/SR 273 west) / US 64 Byp. west (Wilson Parkway/Thornton Taylor Parkway) – Downtown, Petersburg, Lewisburg, Pulaski	Northern end of US 431 concurrency; southern end of US 64 Bypass concurrency; eastern terminus of unsigned SR 273
Lincoln	Fayetteville	12.3	19.8	US 64 / SR 50 (College Street/Winchester Highway/SR 15) – Pulaski, downtown, Lynchburg, Winchester	Eastern terminus of US 64 Bypass
Lincoln		25.0	40.2	SR 129 east (Charity Road) – Lynchburg	Southern end of SR 129 concurrency
Lincoln		25.4	40.9	SR 129 west (Petersburg-Chestnut Ridge Road) – Petersburg	Northern end of SR 129 concurrency
Moore	No major junctions				
Bedford	Shelbyville	36.03	57.98	SR 64 west / SR 130 west (Lewis Avenue) – Lewisburg, Petersburg	Southern end of SR 64/SR 130 concurrency
Bedford	Shelbyville	36.6	58.9	Bedford Veterans Memorial Bridge over the Duck River	
Bedford	Shelbyville	36.8	59.2	US 231 Bus. north (N Cannon Boulevard/SR 10 north/Lane Parkway) / SR 64 east / SR 130 east (Lane Parkway) – Downtown, Wartrace, Tullahoma	Southern terminus of US 231 Business and unsigned SR 387; northern end of SR 64/SR 130 and unsigned SR 10 concurrency; southern end of unsigned SR 387 concurrency
Bedford	Shelbyville	37.5	60.4	US 41A (Elm Street/SR 16) – Unionville, Eagleville, Tullahoma	
Bedford	Shelbyville	38.4	61.8	US 231 Bus. south / SR 82 south (N Main Street/SR 10 south) – Downtown, Lynchburg	Northern terminus of US 231 Business and unsigned SR 387; southern end of SR 82 and unsigned SR 10 concurrency
Bedford	Shelbyville	40.4– 40.7	65.0– 65.5	SR 437 east (Shelbyville Bypass)	Interchange; western terminus of SR 437
Bedford	Shelbyville	42.9	69.0	Bomar Field (Shelbyville Municipal Airport) main entrance	
Bedford		45.8	73.7	SR 82 north (Webb Highway) – Bell Buckle	Northern end of SR 82 concurrency
Rutherford	Christiana	54.4	87.5	SR 269 east – Christiana, Bell Buckle, Wartrace	Southern end of SR 269 concurrency
Rutherford	Christiana	54.9	88.4	SR 269 west (Walnut Grove Road) – Rockvale, Eagleville	Northern end of SR 269 concurrency
Rutherford	Murfreesboro	61.0	98.2	Thomas Hutchinson Bridge over the Middle Fork of the Stones River	
Rutherford	Murfreesboro	61.4– 61.7	98.8– 99.3	I-24 – Nashville, Chattanooga	I-24 exit 81
Rutherford	Murfreesboro	63.6	102.4	US 41 south / US 70S east (Broad Street/SR 1 east/SR 99 east) – Manchester, Woodbury, Bradyville	Southern end of US 41/US 70S/SR 1/SR 99 concurrency
Rutherford	Murfreesboro	64.3	103.5	US 41 north / US 70S west (Broad Street/SR 1 west) / SR 96 west (Old Fort Parkway/SR 99 west) – Smyrna, Franklin, Eagleville	Northern end of US 41/US 70S/SR 1/SR 99 concurrency; southern end of SR 96 concurrency; interchange
Rutherford	Murfreesboro	65.3	105.1	SR 96 east (E Clark Boulevard) – Lascassas, Auburntown, Liberty	Northern end of SR 96 concurrency
Rutherford	Murfreesboro	66.4	106.9	Airport Road - Murfreesboro Municipal Airport	
Rutherford	Murfreesboro	68.7	110.6	SR 268 (W Thompson Street/Compton Street)	
Rutherford	Walterhill	70.9– 71.0	114.1– 114.3	Walter Hill Bridge over the East Fork of the Stones River	
Rutherford	Walterhill	71.5	115.1	SR 266 (Jefferson Pike) – Smyrna, Lascassas	
Wilson		76.7	123.4	SR 452 west (Bill France Boulevard) to I-840 – Nashville Superspeedway	Western terminus of SR 452
Wilson	Cedars of Lebanon State Park	81.8	131.6	Cedar Forest Road - Cedars of Lebanon State Park	Access road into park
Wilson	Cedars of Lebanon State Park	82.4	132.6	SR 265 (Central Pike/Chicken Road) – Hermitage, Watertown	
Wilson	Lebanon	88.3– 88.4	142.1– 142.3	I-40 – Nashville, Knoxville	I-40 exit 238
Wilson	Lebanon	90.1	145.0	US 70 Bus. (Main Street/SR 24)	Roundabout
Wilson	Lebanon	90.4	145.5	US 70 (High Street/SR 26) – Watertown, Mount Juliet	
Wilson–Trousdale county line		96.7– 96.9	155.6– 155.9	Nathan J Harsh Bridge over the Cumberland River	
Trousdale		103.1	165.9	SR 10 north / SR 25 (Hartsville Pike) – Gallatin, Hartsville	Northern end of unsigned SR 10 concurrency; southern terminus of unsigned SR 376; southern end of unsigned SR 376 concurrency
Trousdale		107.4	172.8	SR 260 east (Browning Branch Road)	Western terminus of SR 260
Sumner	Bransford	110.9	178.5	US 31E south (SR 6 south) – Gallatin, Bethpage	Southern end of US 31E/SR 6 concurrency; northern terminus of unsigned SR 376
Sumner	Westmoreland	115.4	185.7	SR 52 to SR 109 / I-65 – Portland, Lafayette	
Kentucky state line		121.15	194.97	US 231 north / US 31E north continue into Kentucky; End concurrency with unsigned SR 6	
1.000 mi = 1.609 km; 1.000 km = 0.621 mi: Concurrency terminus

== Related routes ==
=== State Route 376 ===
State Route 376
- Location: Paynes Store-Bransford, Tennessee
- Length: 7.9 mi (12.7 km)
- Existed: July 1, 1983–present

State Route 376 (SR 376) runs as a secret, or hidden designation on US 231 from its SR 25/SR 10 junction in Trousdale County to the US 31E (SR 6) junction in Bransford. Previously signed as State Route 10A (SR 10A), SR 376 was designated in 1983 as part of the 1983 Tennessee state highway renumbering.

=== State Route 387 ===
State Route 387
- Location: Shelbyville, Tennessee
- Length: 1.53 mi (2.46 km)
- Existed: July 1, 1983–present

State Route 387 (SR 387) is the unsigned designation for US 231's bypass of downtown Shelbyville (Lane Parkway/Colloredo Boulevard), with original route through downtown being signed as US 231 Business and SR 82 (N Cannon Boulevard/Main Street/unsigned SR 10).

U.S. Route 231
Previous state: Alabama	Tennessee	Next state: Kentucky
