= SYI =

SYI or syi may refer to:

- SYI, the IATA and FAA LID code for Shelbyville Municipal Airport (Tennessee), United States
- syi, the ISO 639-3 code for Seki language
