= Tennessee State Route 269 =

State highway in Tennessee, United States

State Route 269

Route information
- Maintained by TDOT
- Length: 49.2 mi (79.2 km)
- Existed: July 1, 1983–present

Major junctions
- West end: US 31A in Allisona
- US 41A / SR 99 in Eagleville; US 231 in Christiana; SR 82 in Bell Buckle; SR 64 in Wartrace
- East end: US 41A in Tullahoma

Location
- Country: United States
- State: Tennessee
- Counties: Rutherford, Bedford, Coffee

Highway system
- Tennessee State Routes; Interstate; US; State
← I-269	→ SR 270

State Route 269 (SR 269) is a 49.2-mile-long (79.2 km) east–west state highway in central Middle Tennessee.

== Route description ==
Throughout its entire length, SR 269 is a two-lane highway.

=== Rutherford County ===
SR 269 begins in Rutherford County in Allisona at an intersection with US 31A/SR 11, just a few hundred feet east of the Williamson County line. It heads east to enter Eagleville, where it has a concurrency with US 41A/SR 16 through downtown before splitting off along SR 99. They then leave Eagleville and head east through farmland for several miles to just west of Rockvale, where SR 269 splits from SR 99 and heads southeast through wooded and hilly terrain. SR 269 then re enters farmland and wind its way east past some subdivisions, where it crosses over the West Fork of the Stones River, before passing through Christiana, where it has an intersection and short concurrency with US 231/SR 10. The highway now turns south and winds its through some hills before crossing into Bedford County.

=== Bedford County ===
SR 269 winds its way due south through some hills to pass through Bell Buckle, where it has an extremely short concurrency with SR 82 in downtown. It then turns southeast to pass through farmland before passing through Wartrace, where it has a short concurrency with SR 64. The highway then winds its way through farmland and rural areas for several miles, where it crosses the Garrison Fork and the Duck River, before passing through the community of Cortner and the town of Normandy. SR 269 now turns directly south and heads through mountains to cross into Coffee County.

=== Coffee County ===
SR 269 almost immediately enters the city of Tullahoma and passes by several businesses along N Atlantic Street before crossing an overpass over N Washington Street and making a sharp right onto Marbury Crossing shortly before coming to an end at another intersection with US 41A/SR 16 just north of downtown. Ironically, even though SR 269 is signed east–west for its entire length, it is signed north–south at this intersection.

== Major intersections ==
County	Location	mi	km	Destinations	Notes
Rutherford	Allisona	0.0	0.0	US 31A (Horton Highway/SR 11) – Chapel Hill, College Grove	Western terminus
Rutherford	Eagleville	2.6	4.2	US 41A north (N Main Street/SR 16 north) to I-840 – Nolensville	Western end of US 41A concurrency
Rutherford	Eagleville	3.1	5.0	US 41A south / SR 99 west (S Main Street/SR 16 south) – Chapel Hill, Unionville	Eastern end of US 41A/SR 16 concurrency; western end of SR 99 concurrency
Rutherford		8.5	13.7	SR 99 east (Salem Pike) – Rockvale, Murfreesboro	Eastern end of SR 99 concurrency
Rutherford		16.9	27.2	Bridge over the West Fork of the Stones River	
Rutherford	Christiana	18.7	30.1	US 231 north (Shelbyville Pike/SR 10 north) – Murfreesboro	Western end of US 231/SR 10 concurrency
Rutherford	Christiana	19.1	30.7	US 231 south (Shelbyville Pike/SR 10 south) – Shelbyville	Eastern end of US 231/SR 10 concurrency
Bedford	Bell Buckle	30.1	48.4	SR 82 north (Webb Road) – Beechgrove	Western end of SR 82 concurrency
Bedford	Bell Buckle	30.2	48.6	SR 82 south (Webb Road) – Shelbyville	Eastern end of SR 82 concurrency
Bedford	Wartrace	35.2	56.6	SR 64 west (Blackman Boulevard) – Shelbyville	Western end of SR 64 concurrency
Bedford	Wartrace	35.3	56.8	SR 64 east (Blackman Boulevard) to I-24 – Beechgrove	Eastern end of SR 64 concurrency
Bedford		36.3	58.4	General William J Hardee Memorial Bridge over the Garrison Fork	
Bedford		41.2	66.3	Dement Bridge over the Duck River	
Coffee	Tullahoma	49.2	79.2	US 41A (N Jackson Street/SR 16) – Shelbyville, Downtown, Estill Springs	Eastern terminus (signed southern only at this intersection)
1.000 mi = 1.609 km; 1.000 km = 0.621 mi: Concurrency terminus
