= Tennessee State Route 82 =

State highway in Tennessee, United States

State Route 82
- SR 82 highlighted in red

Route information
- Maintained by TDOT
- Length: 32.0 mi (51.5 km)

Major junctions
- South end: SR 55 in Lynchburg
- SR 64 in Shelbyville; US 41A in Shelbyville; US 231 in Shelbyville; SR 437 in Shelbyville; US 231 in Deason; SR 269 in Bell Buckle
- North end: SR 64 near Beech Grove

Location
- Country: United States
- State: Tennessee
- Counties: Moore, Bedford

Highway system
- Tennessee State Routes; Interstate; US; State
← SR 81	→ SR 83

State Route 82 (SR 82) is a secondary state highway that runs through Moore and Bedford counties in south central Tennessee in the United States. The route runs from an intersection with SR 55 in Lynchburg north and east to SR 64 near Beech Grove.

== Route description ==
=== Moore County ===
SR 82 begins at an intersection with SR 55 in Lynchburg, Moore County, heading northwest on two-lane undivided Flat Creek Highway, a secondary state route. The road runs through a mix of farm fields and woods with some homes and curves to the north, winding through more rural land. The route leaves Lynchburg and crosses into Bedford County.

=== Bedford County ===
SR 82 continues northwest through fields and forests as an unnamed road before turning north and passing through the community of Flat Creek. The highway then bends back to the northwest and heads through more rural areas with a few homes. The road turns north and then northwest again before passing near rural residential development and crossing the Duck River. The route enters Shelbyville and becomes Kingree Road, running northwest through residential areas. SR 82 turns north-northwest onto South Britain Street before it curves to the north and becomes South Jefferson Street, widening to four lanes. The road passes to the east of downtown Shelbyville and comes to an intersection with SR 64, at which point that route turns north for a concurrency with SR 82. The two routes follow North Jefferson Street north, crossing the unused tracks of the Walking Horse and Eastern Railroad, before curving west and becoming East Lane Street. The road passes businesses to the north of downtown before SR 82 splits from SR 64 by turning north onto North Main Street, a three-lane road with a center left-turn lane. The route continues to an intersection with US 231 Bus. (SR 10), at which point those two routes turn north to join SR 82. The road passes more businesses and gains a second northbound lane, crossing US 41A (SR 16). The three routes continue along a commercial strip as a five-lane road with a center left-turn lane before coming to an intersection with US 231 (SR 387), where US 231 Bus. comes to its northern terminus.

US 231 and SR 82, along with unsigned SR 10, continue north along five-lane North Main Street past more businesses and shopping centers in the northern part of Shelbyville. Farther north, the road passes a mix of fields and commercial development and reaches an interchange with the western terminus of SR 437, which runs along the Shelbyville Bypass. Following this, US 231/SR 82 leaves Shelbyville and becomes an unnamed road, running through a mix of fields and woods with some homes. The road passes near commercial development and heads between the Bedford County Medical Center to the west and the Shelbyville Municipal Airport to the east. US 231/SR 82 runs through farmland with some homes and transitions into a four-lane divided highway. SR 82 splits from US 231 (SR 10) south of Deason by turning east onto an unnamed two-lane undivided road. The route runs east through farmland with some woods and homes, becoming Webb Highway. The road continues through rural areas before it enters Bell Buckle, where it becomes Webb Road West and passes a mix of fields and residences. In the commercial center of Bell Buckle, SR 82 intersects SR 269 and forms a brief concurrency with that route as the road crosses CSX's Chattanooga Subdivision railroad line. SR 269 turns north in the downtown area and SR 82 continues east along Webb Road East through residential areas. The road leaves Bell Buckle and becomes unnamed, heading northeast through farmland. The route runs east through forests before it curves northeast again into a mix of farmland and woodland with some homes. SR 82 heads east through more rural areas and comes to its northern terminus at an intersection with SR 64 south of Beech Grove.

The section of SR 82 between SR 55 in Lynchburg and the north end of the US 231 concurrency near Deason is designated a Tennessee Scenic Parkway.

== Junction list ==
County	Location	mi	km	Destinations	Notes
Moore	Lynchburg	0.0	0.0	SR 55 (Lynchburg Highway) – Lynchburg, Tullahoma	Southern terminus
Bedford	Shelbyville	13.5	21.7	SR 64 east / SR 130 east (East Depot Street)	South end of SR 64 overlap
Bedford	Shelbyville	13.7	22.0	SR 64 west / SR 130 west (Lane Parkway)	North end of SR 64 overlap
Bedford	Shelbyville	13.9	22.4	US 231 Bus. south (SR 10 south / North Cannon Boulevard)	South end of US 231 Bus./SR 10 overlap
Bedford	Shelbyville	14.0	22.5	US 41A (SR 16 / Elm Street / Madison Street)	
Bedford	Shelbyville	14.5	23.3	US 231 south (SR 387 south / Colloredo Boulevard) US 231 Bus. ends	Northern terminus of US 231 Bus., south end of US 231 overlap
Bedford	Shelbyville	16.7	26.9	SR 437 east (Shelbyville Bypass) – Tullahoma	Interchange
Bedford	Deason	20.9	33.6	US 231 north (SR 10 north) – Murfreesboro	North end of US 231/SR 10 overlap
Bedford	Bell Buckle	25.8	41.5	SR 269 east – Wartrace	South end of SR 269 overlap
Bedford	Bell Buckle	25.8	41.5	SR 269 west (Main Street)	North end of SR 269 overlap
Bedford	Beech Grove	32.0	51.5	SR 64 to I-24 – Beech Grove, Wartrace	Northern terminus
1.000 mi = 1.609 km; 1.000 km = 0.621 mi
