= Wheel, Tennessee =

Wheel
- Unincorporated community
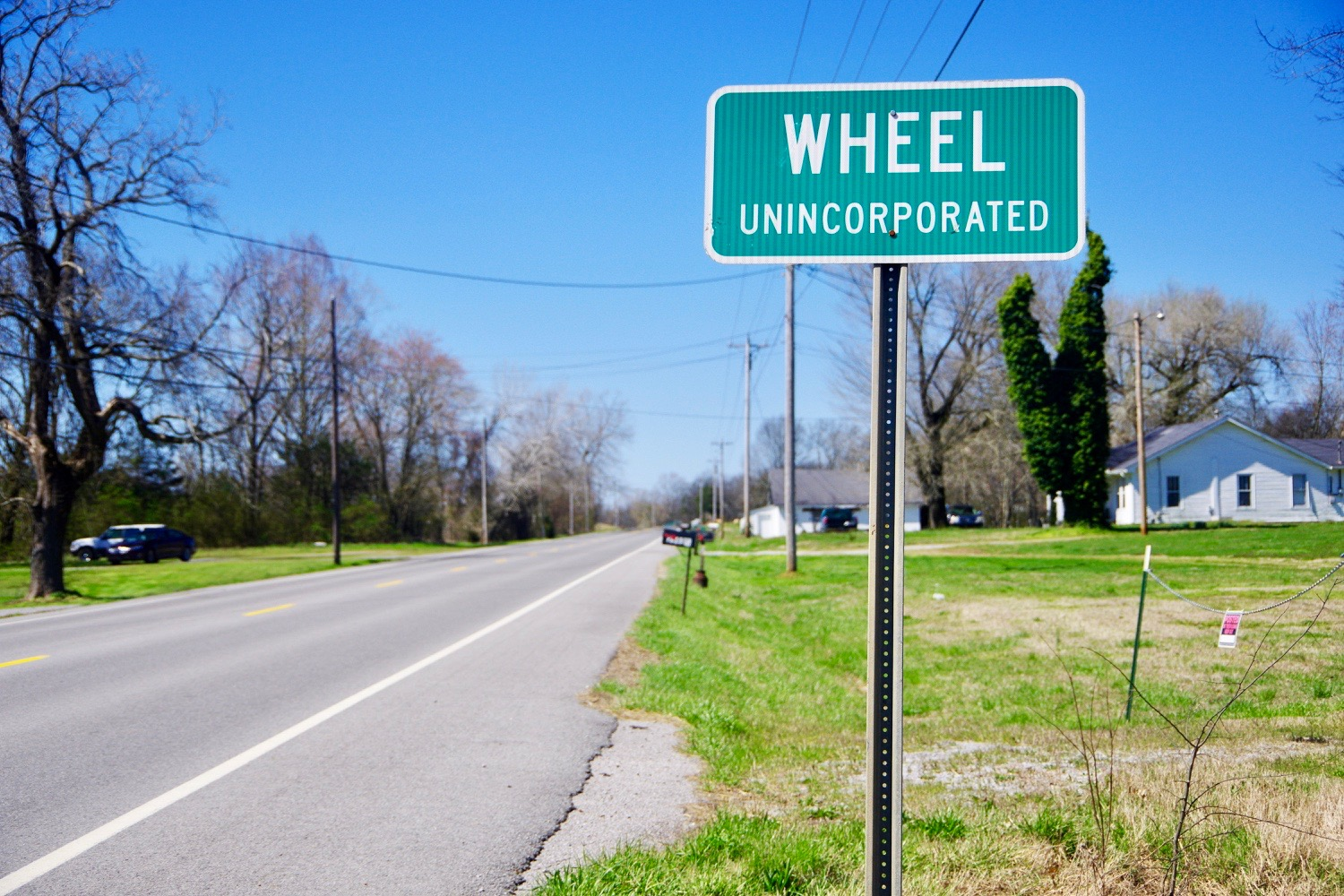
- Sign along SR 64

- Location within Tennessee Location within the United States
- Coordinates: 35°29′19″N 86°37′47″W
- Country: United States
- State: Tennessee
- County: Bedford
- Elevation: 781 ft (238 m)
- Time zone: UTC-6 (Central (CST))
  - Summer (DST): UTC-5 (CDT)
- ZIP code: 37160, 37091
- Area code: 931
- GNIS feature ID: 1274280

Wheel is an unincorporated community in Bedford County, Tennessee. It lies along State Route 64 west of Shelbyville.

== History ==
A post office called Wheel was established in 1888, and remained in operation until 1902. The community was so named for the Agricultural Wheel, a farmers' alliance prominent in late 19th-century state politics.
