= Bottle Hollow, Tennessee =

- Unincorporated community
- Location within Tennessee Location within the United States
- Coordinates: 35°24′25″N 86°21′44″W
- Country: United States
- State: Tennessee
- County: Bedford
- Elevation: 850 ft (260 m)
- Time zone: UTC-6 (Central (CST))
  - Summer (DST): UTC-5 (CDT)
- Area code: 931
- GNIS feature ID: 1314719

Bottle Hollow is an unincorporated community in Bedford County, Tennessee, United States. Bottle Hollow is 7.6 miles (12.2 km) southeast of Shelbyville.
