= Fairfield, Bedford County, Tennessee =

Fairfield
- Unincorporated community
- Location within Tennessee Location within the United States
- Coordinates: 35°34′00″N 86°17′07″W
- Country: United States
- State: Tennessee
- County: Bedford
- Elevation: 833 ft (254 m)
- Time zone: UTC-6 (Central (CST))
  - Summer (DST): UTC-5 (CDT)
- Area code: 931
- GNIS feature ID: 1283975

Fairfield is an unincorporated community in Bedford County, Tennessee. Fairfield is located on Tennessee State Route 64 3.8 miles (6.1 km) northeast of Wartrace.

Fairfield was platted about 1830. A post office called Fairfield was established in 1842, and remained in operation until 1905.
