= Haley, Tennessee =

Unincorporated community in Tennessee, US

Coordinates: 35°29′18″N 86°18′39″W

Haley is an unincorporated community in Bedford County, in the U.S. state of Tennessee.

== History ==
Variant names were "Haleys Station", Haleys Woodyard", and "Maupins Station". A post office called Haley's Station was established in 1868, the name was changed to Haley in 1882, and the post office closed in 1936. The community had a depot on the Nashville and Chattanooga Railway.
