= Tennessee State Route 16 =

State highway in Tennessee, United States

State Route 16
- SR 16; primary in red, unsigned in blue

Route information
- Maintained by TDOT
- Length: 76.94 mi (123.82 km)
- Existed: October 1, 1923–present

Major junctions
- South end: SR 79 at the Alabama State Line near Hytop, AL
- US 64 near Winchester; US 41A / SR 50 in Winchester; SR 55 in Tullahoma; SR 437 in Shelbyville; SR 64 in Shelbyville; US 231 in Shelbyville
- North end: US 31A / US 41A in Kirkland

Location
- Country: United States
- State: Tennessee
- Counties: Franklin, Coffee, Moore, Bedford, Rutherford, Williamson

Highway system
- Tennessee State Routes; Interstate; US; State
← SR 15	→ SR 17

State Route 16 (SR 16) is a state highway in the U.S. state of Tennessee. Its southern terminus is at the Alabama state line, where it continues as State Route 79 (SR 79) in Alabama. From there, it continues to Winchester, where it becomes unsigned in a concurrency with U.S. Route 41A (US 41A). This concurrency lasts until its northern terminus in Williamson County, at a junction with U.S. Route 31A (US 31A).

== Route description ==
=== Franklin County ===
SR 16 begins at the Alabama state line in Franklin County, on top of a very tall ridge, where it continues as State Route 79, several miles north of Scottsboro, Alabama. It continues north as a very curvy 2-lane highway before exiting the mountains and lowering down into some farmland. It then goes north to enter Winchester at an interchange with US 64 and SR 15, a 4-lane bypass of Winchester, before turning east and entering downtown. In downtown, it comes to an intersection with US 41A, SR 50, and SR 130. SR 16 continues east and becomes the unsigned companion route of US 41A, while also being concurrent with SR 50. US 41A/SR 16 then turn north at an intersection where SR 50 separates and continues east into Decherd. They then have an intersection with SR 127 before leaving Winchester. They then go north as a 2-lane highway through flat farmland before crossing the Elk River and going through Estill Springs, where it has an intersection with SR&nbps;279 and passes by the Arnold Air Force Base and the Woods Reservoir before crossing the Coffee County line and entering Tullahoma.

=== Coffee County ===
US 41A/SR 16 then immediately enter downtown Tullahoma after crossing into Coffee County, where they intersect and become concurrent with SR 55/SR 130. They then go north through downtown before SR 55/SR 130 split off and west concurrent with each other and US 41A/SR 16 then pass through a major business district before intersecting with SR 269 and leaving Tullahoma, where it briefly crosses into Moore County before entering Bedford County.

=== Bedford County ===
In Bedford County, US 41A/SR 16 then turn west and pass just south of Normandy before having an intersection with SR 276. They then enter Shelbyville at an intersection with SR 437, just feet before their intersection with SR 64. US 41A/SR 16 then continue through some suburban areas and pass by an industrial park before entering downtown and having an intersection with US 231 Business/SR 10/SR 82. They then have an intersection with US 231/SR 387 before leaving downtown and going through another suburban area before leaving Shelbyville and turning northwest. US 41A/SR 16 go northwest through some countryside and have an intersection with SR 270 before passing through Unionville, turning north temporarily before going northwest again. They then pass through more countryside before crossing into Rutherford County.

=== Rutherford County ===
In Rutherford County, US 41A/SR 16 then go northwest to an intersection and becoming concurrent with SR 99 before entering Eagleville, where they have another intersection and short concurrency with SR 269, where SR 99 splits off and goes east to follow SR 269. US 41A/SR 16 then continue through Eagleville before continuing northwest and crossing into Williamson County.

=== Williamson County ===
After crossing into Williamson County, US 41A/SR 16 then continues for a very short distance before coming to a Y-intersection with US 31A/SR 11 in Kirkland, just north of College Grove and just south of I-840 and Triune. At this intersection, US 41A continues north and becomes concurrent with US 31A/SR 11 while SR 16 ends here.

== Major intersections ==
County	Location	mi	km	Destinations	Notes
Franklin		0.00	0.00	SR 79 south – Hytop, Skyline, Scottsboro	Continuation into Alabama; southern terminus; SR 16 begins as a signed primary highway
Franklin	Winchester			US 64 (Veterans Memorial Drive/SR 15 west/SR 433 north) / US 64 Bus. (David Crockett Highway) / SR 50 (George Fraley Parkway) to I-24 – Fayetteville, Pelham, Decherd, Lynchburg	Southern end of unsigned SR 15 concurrency; southern terminus of unsigned SR 433; western terminus of US 64 Bus.; southern end of SR 50 concurrency
Franklin	Winchester			SR 130 (N High Street) – Tullahoma	Eastern terminus of SR 130
Franklin	Winchester			US 41A south (S College Street/SR 15 east) – Cowan, Sewanee	Southern end of unsigned US 41A concurrency; eastern terminus of US 64 Bus.; northern end of unsigned SR 15 concurrency; SR 16 becomes unsigned
Franklin	Decherd			SR 50 east (W Main Street) – Pelham	Northern end of SR 50 concurrency
Franklin	Decherd			SR 127 north (Aedc Road) – Hillsboro	Southern terminus of SR 127
Franklin	Estill Springs			SR 279 east (Spring Creek Road) – Franklin County Park, Elk River Dam	Western terminus of SR 279
Franklin	Estill Springs			UTSI Road – University of Tennessee Space Institute, Arnold Air Force Base	
Coffee	Tullahoma			SR 55 east (East Carroll Street) / SR 130 south (West Carroll Street) to I-24 – Arnold Air Force Base, Manchester	Southern end of SR 55 and SR 130 concurrencies; I-24 via 55 east
Coffee	Tullahoma			SR 55 west / SR 130 north (Wilson Avenue) – Lynchburg, Motlow State Community College	Northern end of SR 55 and SR 130 concurrencies
Coffee	Tullahoma			William Northern Boulevard – Tullahoma Regional Airport	
Coffee	Tullahoma			SR 269 north (Marbury Crossing) – Normandy, Wartrace	Eastern (signed southern) terminus of SR 269; Harton Regional Medical Center west of this intersection
Moore	No major junctions				
Bedford				SR 276 south (Thompson Creek Road)	Northern terminus of SR 276
Bedford				SR 437 west (Shelbyville Bypass)	Eastern terminus of SR 437; northern and eastern bypass of Shelbyville
Bedford	Shelbyville			SR 64 (Wartrace Pike) to I-24 – Wartrace	
Bedford	Shelbyville			US 231 Bus. / SR 82 (Main Street/SR 10)	Former route of US 231; Bedford County Medical Center to the north
Bedford	Shelbyville			US 231 (Colloredo Boulevard/Lake Parkway/SR 387) – Fayetteville, Murfreesboro	
Bedford				SR 270 west (Old Columbia Road) – Chapel Hill	Eastern terminus of SR 270
Rutherford				SR 99 west (Chapel Hill Pike) – Chapel Hill	Southern end of SR 99 concurrency
Rutherford	Eagleville			SR 99 east / SR 269 east – Murfreesboro	Northern end of SR 99 concurrency; southern end of SR 269 concurrency
Rutherford	Eagleville			SR 269 west (Allisona Road) – Allisona	Northern end of SR 269 concurrency
Williamson	Kirkland	76.94	123.82	US 31A / US 41A north (Horton Highway/SR 11) to I-840 – Chapel Hill, Nolensville	Northern terminus; US 41A continues north along US 31A
1.000 mi = 1.609 km; 1.000 km = 0.621 mi: Concurrency terminus
