= Cortner, Tennessee =

Unincorporated community in Tennessee, U.S.

Coordinates: 35°28′06″N 86°16′35″W

Cortner is an unincorporated community in Bedford County, in the U.S. state of Tennessee.

== History ==
A post office called Cortner was established in 1885, and remained in operation until 1943. The community had a depot on the Nashville and Chattanooga Railway. A variant name was "Cortners Station".
