= Tennessee State Route 99 =

State highway in Tennessee, United States

State Route 99
- SR 99, primary in red, secondary in blue, unsigned in green

Route information
- Maintained by TDOT
- Length: 126.7 mi (203.9 km)

Major junctions
- West end: US 64 in Waynesboro
- US 412 / SR 20 / SR 48 in Hohenwald; Natchez Trace Parkway in Gordonsburg; US 43 / US 412 Bus. in Columbia; US 31 / SR 7 in Columbia; I-65 in Columbia; US 431 near Columbia; US 31A in Chapel Hill; US 41A / SR 269 in Eagleville; I-24 in Murfreesboro; US 41 / US 70S / US 231 / SR 96 in Murfreesboro
- East end: SR 64 in Bradyville

Location
- Country: United States
- State: Tennessee
- Counties: Wayne, Lewis, Maury, Marshall, Rutherford, Cannon

Highway system
- Tennessee State Routes; Interstate; US; State
← SR 98	→ SR 100

State Route 99 (SR 99) is a long east–west highway in Middle Tennessee. The route travels through large sections of rural areas and for most of the length is a secondary highway. The route begins near Waynesboro and ends in Bradyville after logging 126.7 mi (203.9 km) and passing through six counties.

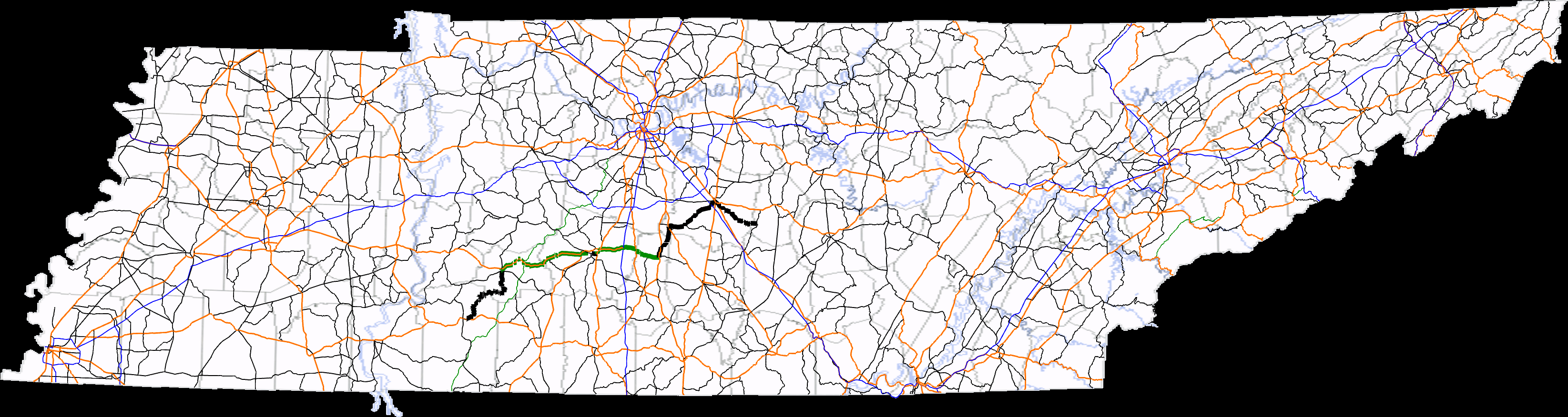
SR 99 highlighted

== Route description ==
=== Wayne County ===
SR 99 begins as a secondary highway in Wayne County in Waynesboro at an intersection with US 64/SR 15 just east of downtown along a former alignment of US 64. The highway then passes by several homes and businesses before turning north onto Natural Bridge Road, where it leaves Old Hwy. 64 and Waynesboro. SR 99 goes through some rural areas before becoming very curvy as it passes through Ashland and begins paralleling the Buffalo River, shortly before crossing into Lewis County.

=== Lewis County ===
SR 99 continues to wind and curve its way through the countryside before making a sharp left turn onto Seiber Ridge Road, where it becomes Allens Creek Road, shortly before crossing the creek of the same name. The highway then makes a sharp right turn onto Buffalo Road, and continues to wind its way across the countryside and eventually crosses the Buffalo River, before continuing northeast and entering Hohenwald, where it comes to an intersection and becomes concurrent with SR 20. They go north past several businesses before turning west and coming to an intersection and becoming concurrent with SR 48. They then pass through some neighborhoods before entering downtown and coming to an intersection with US 412, where SR 48 continues north, while SR 20 turns west to become concurrent with US 412 and SR 99 turns east to do the same, becoming unsigned and a primary highway. US 412/SR 99 go east as a 4-lane undivided highway to leave downtown and continue east through a major business district before leaving Hohenwald and entering wooded areas, where it widens to a divided highway. The highway continues northeast through wooded areas before entering farmland, shortly before downgrading to an undivided highway, entering Gordonsburg, and having an interchange with the Natchez Trace Parkway. US 412/SR 99 then narrow to 2-lanes and continue through farmland before crossing into Maury County.

=== Maury County ===
US 412/SR 99 continue east through farmland and pass through the community of Hampshire, where it has an intersection with SR 166. The highway continues east through farmland before entering the city of Columbia, where SR 99 separates from US 412 at an interchange with US 43/SR 6, where US 412 follows that highway while SR 99 continues into town concurrent with US 412 Bus. They go east along Hampshire Pike to an intersection and become concurrent with SR 50 (Williamsport Pike), before continuing east through a couple of neighborhoods before coming to an intersection with James Campbell Boulevard, where SR 50 splits off and goes southeast. US 412 Bus/SR 99 continue east through several neighborhoods, where they have an intersection with SR 243 (Trotwood Avenue) before entering downtown and coming to an intersection and turning north to become concurrent with US 31/SR 7 (North Garden Street). They continue north through downtown to an intersection with North James Campbell Boulevard, where SR 7 splits off and goes north. They then cross a bridge over the Duck River to leave downtown and widen to a 4-lane divided highway, where it passes through a major business district before coming to another intersection with US 43/US 412/SR 6, where US 412 Bus ends, US 43/SR 6 turn north on US 31, and SR 99 turns right to become concurrent as they turns and go through another business district. US 412/SR 99 then narrows to 2-lanes and continues east to leave the city, though it is still within the city limits, and go through farmland to eventually come to an interchange with I-65 (Exit 46), where US 412 ends and SR 99 becomes signed as a primary highway as it leaves Columbia and continues east. The highway passes through farmland and has short concurrency with US 431/SR 106 before crossing into Marshall County.

=== Marshall County ===
SR 99 continues east through farmland, where it has an intersection with SR 272, to come to an intersection with US 31A/SR 11, where it turns secondary and becomes concurrent with that highway shortly before having an intersection SR 270. The highway then continues north past several homes and businesses before passing straight through downtown Chapel Hill, after which SR 99 splits off from US 31A/SR 11 and goes east, leaving Chapel Hill. The highway then curves northeastward and crosses into Rutherford County shortly afterwards.

=== Rutherford County ===
SR 99 continues northeast to enter Eagleville at a Y-Intersection with US 41A/SR 16, which it becomes concurrent with for a short distance splitting off and going east on a new bypass of downtown and becoming concurrent with SR 269 before leaving Eagleville and continuing east through farmland, with SR 269 splitting off just south of Rockvale. SR 99 then passes through Rockvale before entering Murfreesboro, where it passes through before eventually having an interchange with I-24 (Exit 80). SR 99 then comes to an intersection and becomes concurrent with SR 96 (Old Fort Parkway), where it becomes unsigned again as it passes through a major business district as a 4-lane divided highway to enter downtown and come to an intersection with US 41/US 70S/US 231/SR 1/SR 10, where SR 96 continues north along US 231/SR 10 (Memorial Boulevard) and SR 99 turns east along US 41/US 70S/US 231/SR 1/SR 10 (NW Broad Street) to pass through downtown, with US 231/SR 10 (South Church Street) splitting shortly afterwards. They then come to an intersection with Mercury Boulevard, where US 70S/SR 1 split off to the east and SR 2 begins concurrent with US 41/SR 99 (SE Broad Street). The highway then heads south for a short distance before SR 99 splits off at a Y-Intersection onto Bradyville Pike as a 2-lane road. SR 99 then passes through several neighborhoods before leaving Murfreesboro and continuing east through farmland and countryside before crossing into Cannon County.

=== Cannon County ===
SR 99 continues east through countryside and farmland before entering Bradyville and coming to an end just north of downtown at an intersection with SR 64 (Bradyville Road).

== Counties traversed ==
county	mi	km
Wayne	14.1	22.7
Lewis	30	48.3
Maury	31.6	50.9
Marshall	14.7	23.7
Rutherford	36.6	58.9
Cannon	1.4	2.3
Total	128.4	206.6

== Major intersections ==
County	Location	mi	km	Destinations	Notes
Wayne	Waynesboro	0.0	0.0	US 64 (Dexter L. Woods Memorial Boulevard/SR 15) – Downtown Waynesboro, Savannah, Lawrenceburg	Western terminus; SR 99 begins as a secondary highway
Lewis	Hohenwald	28.5	45.9	SR 20 east (East Fourth Avenue) – Summertown	Western end of SR 20 concurrency
Lewis	Hohenwald	28.8	46.3	SR 48 south (South Park Street) – Waynesboro, Linden	Western end of SR 48 concurrency
Lewis	Hohenwald	29.2	47.0	US 412 west (Main Street/SR 20 west) / SR 48 north (N Park Street) – Linden, Centerville	Eastern end of SR 48 and SR 20 concurrencies; western end of US 412 concurrency; SR 99 becomes unsigned; SR 99 becomes a primary highway
Lewis	Gordonsburg	37.4	60.2	Natchez Trace Parkway	Interchange
Maury	Hampshire	47.0	75.6	SR 166 south (Pisgah Ridge Road) – Mount Pleasant	Northern terminus of SR 166
Maury	Columbia	57.2	92.1	US 412 Bus. east (Hampshire Pike) / US 43 / US 412 east (Columbia Bypass/SR 6) to I-65 – Mount Pleasant, Lawrenceburg	Interchange; eastern end of US 412 concurrency; western end of US 412 Bus. concurrency; western terminus of US 412 Bus.
Maury	Columbia	59.3	95.4	SR 50 west (Williamsport Pike) – Centerville	Western end of SR 50 concurrency
Maury	Columbia	60.4	97.2	SR 50 east (James Campbell Boulevard) – Lewisburg	Eastern end of SR 50 concurrency
Maury	Columbia	61.4	98.8	SR 243 south (Trotwood Avenue) – Mount Pleasant	Northern terminus of SR 243; provides access to Maury County Airport; Old US 43
Maury	Columbia	62.0	99.8	US 31 south (North Garden Street/SR 7 south) – Pulaski	Western end of US 31 and SR 7 concurrencies
Maury	Columbia	62.5	100.6	SR 7 north (North James Campbell Boulevard) – Santa Fe	Eastern end of SR 7 concurrency
Maury	Columbia	63.9	102.8	US 31 north / US 43 south / US 412 west (Bear Creek Pike/SR 6) – Spring Hill, Mount Pleasant	Eastern terminus of US 412 Bus.; eastern end of US 31 concurrency; western end of US 412 concurrency
Maury	Columbia	71.0	114.3	I-65 – Nashville, Huntsville US 412 ends	I-65 exit 46; eastern terminus of US 412; SR 99 signage resumes as primary route
Maury		74.9	120.5	US 431 north (Lewisburg and Franklin Pike/SR 106 north) – Franklin	Western end of US 431/SR 106 concurrency
Maury		75.7	121.8	US 431 south (Lewisburg and Franklin Pike/SR 106 south) – Lewisburg	Eastern end of US 431/SR 106 concurrency
Marshall		79.5	127.9	SR 272 south (Verona Caney Road) – Lewisburg	Northern terminus of SR 272
Marshall	Chapel Hill	83.1	133.7	US 31A south (Sam Davis Highway/SR 11 south) – Henry Horton State Park, Lewisburg	Western end of US 31A/SR 11 concurrency
Marshall	Chapel Hill			SR 99 reverts to a secondary route	
Marshall	Chapel Hill	83.9	135.0	SR 270 east (Old Columbia Road) – Unionville	Western terminus of SR 270
Marshall	Chapel Hill	86.4	139.0	US 31A north (Nashville Highway/SR 11 north) – Nolensville	Eastern end of US 31A/SR 11 concurrency
Rutherford		92.9	149.5	US 41A south (S Main Street/SR 16 south) – Unionville, Shelbyville	Western end of US 41A/SR 16 concurrency
Rutherford	Eagleville	94.4	151.9	US 41A north / SR 269 west (S Main Street/SR 16 north) – Nolensville	Eastern end of US 41A and SR 16 concurrency; western end of SR 269 concurrency
Rutherford		99.9	160.8	SR 269 east (Jackson Ridge Road) – Christiana	Eastern end of SR 269 concurrency
Rutherford	Murfreesboro	110.3	177.5	I-24 – Nashville, Chattanooga	I-24 exit 80
Rutherford	Murfreesboro	111.6	179.6	SR 96 west (Old Fort Parkway) – Franklin	Western end of SR 96 concurrency; SR 99 becomes unsigned
Rutherford	Murfreesboro	112.2	180.6	US 70S west / US 41 north (NW Broad Street/SR 1 west) / US 231 north (Memorial Boulevard/SR 10 north) to I-840 – Smyrna, Lebanon	Western end of US 70S/SR 1/US 41/US 231/SR 10 concurrency; eastern end of SR 96 concurrency; I-840 via US 70S west/US 41 north/SR 1 west
Rutherford	Murfreesboro	112.9	181.7	US 231 south (S Church Street/SR 10 south) to I-24 – Shelbyville	Eastern end of US 231/SR 10 concurrency
Rutherford	Murfreesboro	113.4	182.5	US 70S east (Mercury Boulevard/SR 1 east) – Woodbury	Eastern end of US 70S/SR 1 concurrency; western terminus of unsigned SR 2; western end of SR 2 concurrency
Rutherford	Murfreesboro	113.5	182.7	US 41 south (SE Broad Street/SR 2 east) – Beechgrove, Manchester	Eastern end of US 41/SR 2 concurrency; SR 99 becomes signed
Cannon	Bradyville	128.4	206.6	SR 64 (Bradyville Road) – Readyville, Beechgrove	Eastern terminus; SR 99 ends as a secondary highway
1.000 mi = 1.609 km; 1.000 km = 0.621 mi: Concurrency terminus
