= Tennessee State Route 64 =

State highway in Tennessee, United States

State Route 64
- SR 64; primary in red, secondary in blue

Route information
- Maintained by TDOT
- Length: 50.43 mi (81.16 km)
- Existed: October 1, 1923–present

Major junctions
- West end: US 31A / SR 271 in Farmington
- US 231 / SR 82 in Shelbyville; US 41A in Shelbyville; SR 437 in Shelbyville; I-24 in Beech Grove; US 41 in Beech Grove
- East end: US 70S in Readyville

Location
- Country: United States
- State: Tennessee
- Counties: Marshall, Bedford, Coffee, Cannon

Highway system
- Tennessee State Routes; Interstate; US; State
← US 64	→ I-65

State Route 64 (SR 64) is an east–west state highway in Middle Tennessee. The 50.43-mile-long (81.16 km) route goes from the Lewisburg area to rural western Cannon County via Shelbyville and Beech Grove.

== Route description ==
=== Marshall County ===
SR 64 begins in the Marshall County community of Farmington, at an intersection with US 31A, SR 11, and SR 271.

=== Bedford County ===
It then goes east and crosses into Bedford County, going through Bedford and farmland before intersecting and becoming concurrent with SR 130 and entering Shelbyville. In Shelbyville they intersect and become concurrent with US 231/SR 10/SR 82 and turn north. They then enter downtown and have an intersection with SR 387 (Lane Parkway), where US 231/SR 10 split and turn north, while SR 64/SR 130 turn east on SR 82. They then go around the east side of downtown before splitting, with SR 82 going south, SR 130 going southeast, and SR 64 going east. SR 64 then goes through some suburbs before coming to an intersection with US 41A/SR 16. A short distance later, it intersects SR 437 (Shelbyville Bypass). SR 64 then leaves Shelbyville and continues east. It then curves north to enter Wartrace, where it intersects with SR 269. It then curves east again and intersects SR 82 again before crossing into Coffee County and entering Beech Grove.

=== Coffee County ===
In Beech Grove, SR 64 has an interchange with I-24 at Exit 97. It then has an intersection with US 41/SR 2 before leaving Beech Grove. SR 64 then enters some mountains and becomes curvy before entering Cannon County.

=== Cannon County ===
It then enters Bradyville and has a junction with SR 99 and turning north. SR 64 then enters Readyville to end at US 70S/SR 1.

== Major intersections ==
County	Location	mi	km	Destinations	Notes
Marshall	Farmington	0.00	0.00	US 31A (Nashville Highway/SR 11) – Lewisburg, Chapel Hill SR 271 south (Belfast–Farmington Road) – Belfast	Western terminus; SR 64 begins as a primary route; northern terminus of SR 271
Bedford				SR 130 west – Petersburg	Western end of SR 130 overlap
Bedford	Shelbyville			US 231 (S Cannon Boulevard/SR 10 south) – Fayetteville	Southern end of US 231/SR 10 overlap
Bedford	Shelbyville			US 231 north (Lane Parkway/SR 387 north) – Murfreesboro US 231 Bus. north (N Cannon Boulevard/SR 10 north)	Northern end of US 231/SR 10 overlap; southern terminus of US 231 Business and unsigned SR 387
Bedford	Shelbyville			SR 82 north (N Main Street)	Western end of SR 82 overlap; SR 64 turns secondary
Bedford	Shelbyville			SR 82 south (S Jefferson Street) – Lynchburg	Eastern end of SR 82 overlap
Bedford	Shelbyville			SR 130 east (Belmont Avenue) – Tullahoma	Eastern end of SR 130 overlap; SR 64 turns primary
Bedford	Shelbyville			US 41A (Madison Street/SR 16) – Eagleville, Tullahoma	
Bedford	Shelbyville			SR 437 (Shelbyville Bypass)	
Bedford	Wartrace			SR 269 west (Spring Street) – Bell Buckle	Western end of SR 269 overlap
Bedford	Wartrace			SR 269 east (Church Street) – Normandy	Eastern end of SR 269 overlap
Bedford				SR 82 south (Sawnee Webb Memorial Highway) – Bell Buckle	Northern terminus of SR 82
Coffee	Beech Grove			I-24 – Nashville, Chattanooga	I-24 Exit 97
Coffee	Beech Grove			US 41 (SR 2) – Murfreesboro, Manchester	SR 64 turns secondary
Cannon	Bradyville			SR 99 west (Bradyville Pike) – Murfreesboro	Eastern terminus of SR 99
Cannon	Readyville	50.43	81.16	US 70S (SR 1) – Murfreesboro, Woodbury	Eastern terminus; SR 64 ends as a secondary route.
1.000 mi = 1.609 km; 1.000 km = 0.621 mi: Concurrency terminus
