= Bell Buckle Historic District =

Historic district in Tennessee, United States

- U.S. National Register of Historic Places
- U.S. Historic district
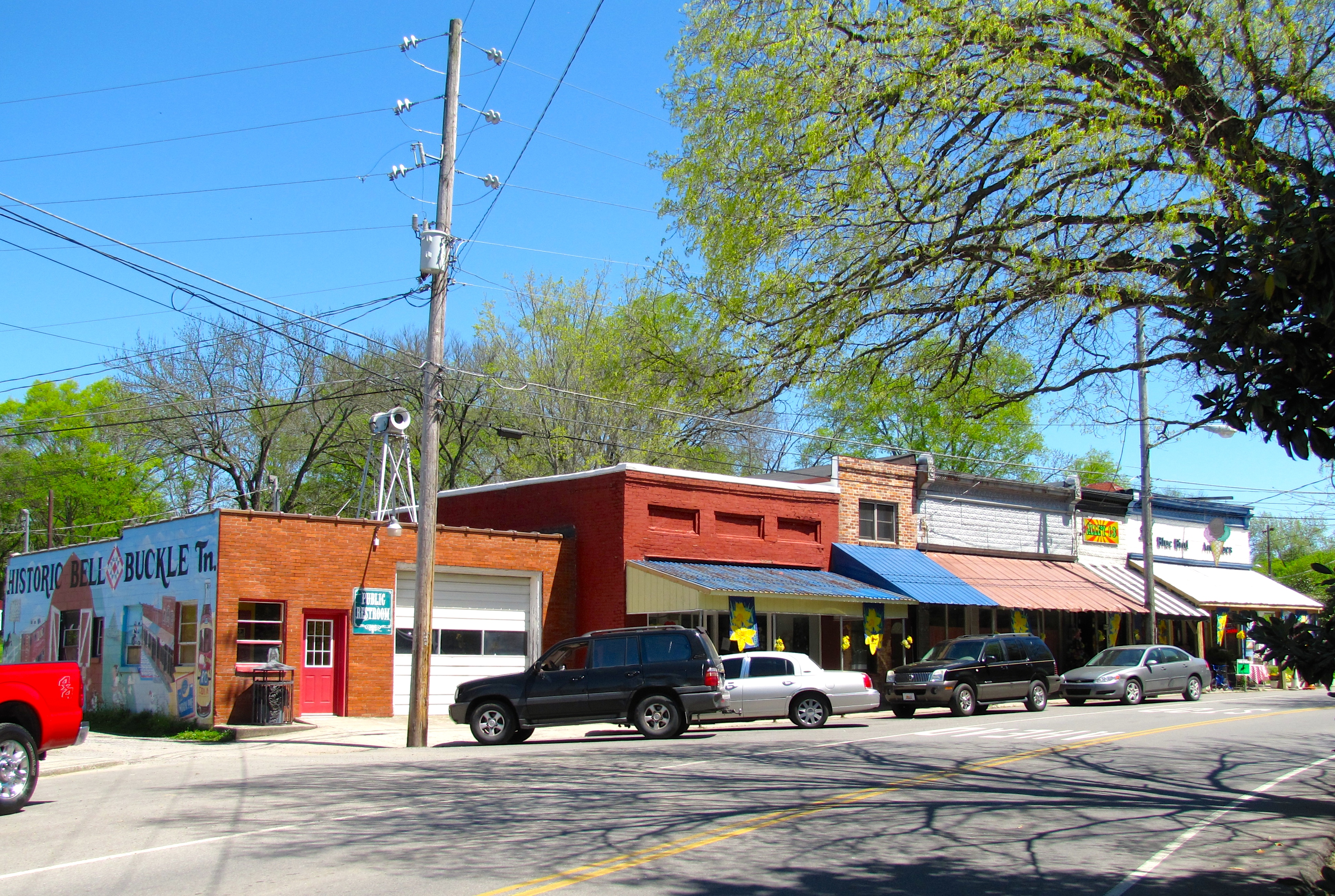
- Buildings in Bell Buckle

- Location within Tennessee Location within the United States
- Location: Irregular pattern bounded roughly by Webb Rd., Abernathy, Maple, Cumberland, and Church Sts., Bell Buckle, Tennessee
- Area: 92 acres (37 ha)
- Architectural style: Late Victorian, Italianate
- NRHP reference No.: 76001762
- Added to NRHP: January 20, 1976

The Bell Buckle Historic District is a National Register-listed historic district in Bell Buckle, Tennessee.

The district includes downtown Bell Buckle and the campus of Webb School. Buildings in the district date from the late 19th century and early 20th century. The historic district was listed on the National Register of Historic Places in 1976, during the United States Bicentennial.
