= The Wheel Store =

- U.S. National Register of Historic Places
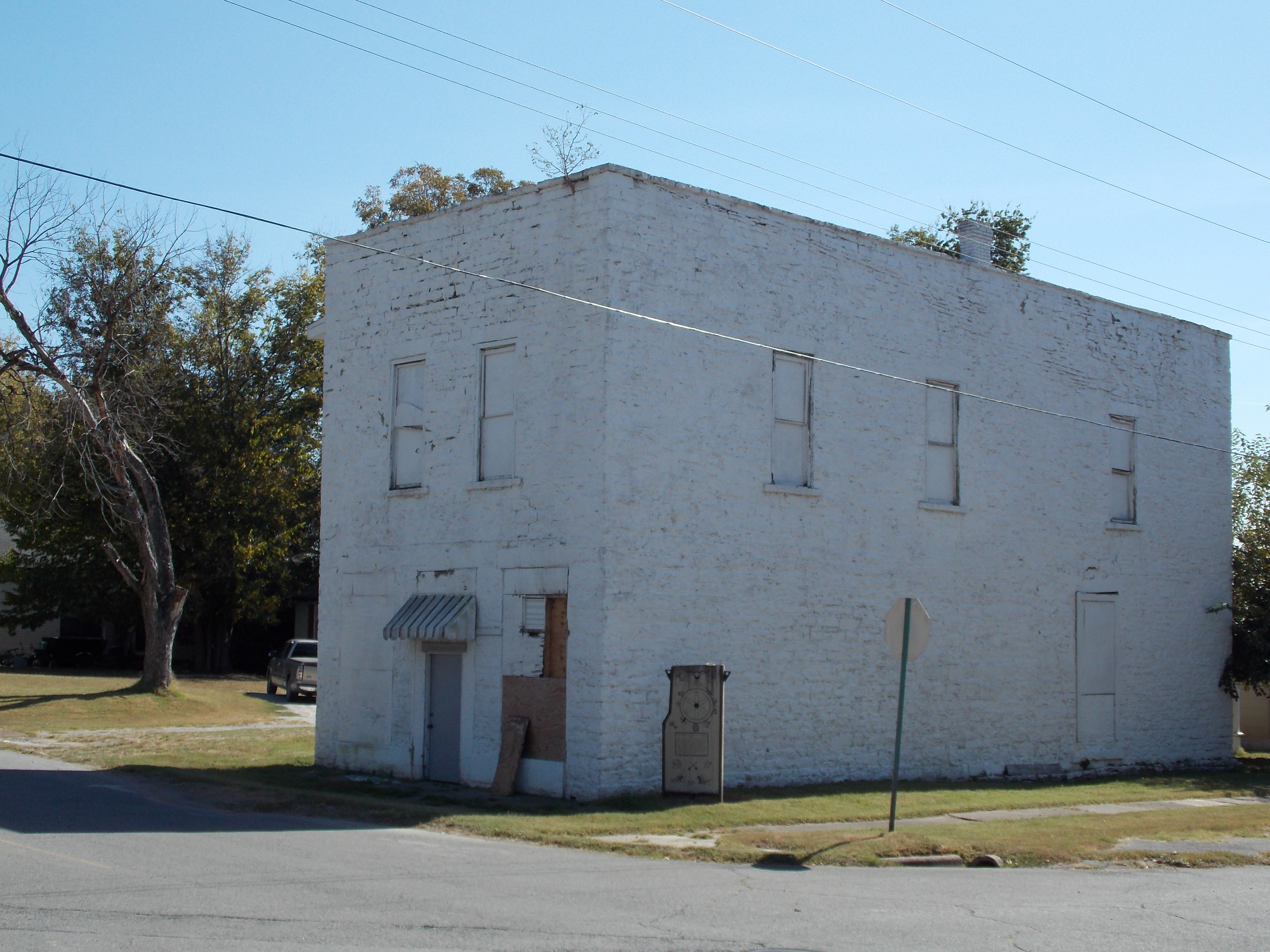

- Location within Arkansas Location within the United States
- Location: River and Broad Sts., Batesville, Arkansas
- Coordinates: 35°46′3″N 91°39′0″W
- Area: less than one acre
- Built: 1887
- Built by: Independence Co. Wheel Cooperative
- Architectural style: Late 19th And 20th Century Revivals, Vernacular commercial
- NRHP reference No.: 88002822
- Added to NRHP: December 8, 1988

The Wheel Store is a historic commercial building at River and Broad Streets in Batesville, Arkansas. It is a two-story ashlar sandstone structure, with a flat roof. Its front facade has a single storefront, with two now-filled window openings flanking the entrance on the first level, and two windows above. The building was erected in 1887 to house a store and meeting space for a local chapter of the Agricultural Wheel, an agrarian reform organization established in Arkansas in the early 1880s.

The building was listed on the National Register of Historic Places in 1988.

== See also ==
- National Register of Historic Places listings in Independence County, Arkansas
