= U.S. Route 41 Alternate (Tennessee–Kentucky) =

U.S. Highway in Tennessee and Kentucky

U.S. Route 41A
- US 41A highlighted in red

Route information
- Auxiliary route of US 41
- Maintained by TDOT and KYTC
- Length: 173.86 mi (279.80 km): 157.87 miles (254.07 km) in Tennessee; 15.99 miles (25.73 km) in Kentucky

Major junctions
- South end: US 41 in Monteagle, TN
- I-24 in Monteagle, TN; I-840 in Triune, TN; I-440 in Nashville, TN; US 41 / US 70S in Nashville, TN; I-40 in Nashville, TN; US 70 / US 431 in Nashville, TN; I-65 in Nashville, TN; US 79 in Clarksville, TN; I-24 in Oak Grove, KY
- North end: US 41 / US 68 / KY 80 / KY 109 in Hopkinsville, KY

Location
- Country: United States
- States: Tennessee, Kentucky
- Counties: TN: Grundy, Marion, Franklin, Coffee, Moore, Bedford, Rutherford, Williamson, Davidson, Cheatham, Robertson, Montgomery; KY: Christian

Highway system
- United States Numbered Highway System; List; Special; Divided
- Kentucky State Highway System; Interstate; US; State; Parkways
- Tennessee State Routes; Interstate; US; State
← US 41	KY	→ US 42
← US 41	TN	→ SR 41

U.S. Route 41 Alternate (US 41 Alt.), also signed U.S. Route 41A in Tennessee (US 41A), connects the town of Monteagle, Tennessee, with Hopkinsville, Kentucky, 10 miles (16 km) north of the Tennessee line. It serves the city of Clarksville, Tennessee, on its way to Nashville, where it briefly runs concurrently with US 41. It then separates again to serve Shelbyville, Winchester, and Tullahoma before rejoining the main route atop Monteagle Mountain. US 41A runs west of US 41 for its entire length, aside from one mile (1.6 km) in downtown Nashville where they are concurrent. US 41A is also concurrent with U.S. Route 31A from Nashville to Triune, Tennessee, for a distance of approximately 25 miles (40 km).

== Route description ==
=== Monteagle to Shelbyville ===
US 41A begins in Monteagle, and runs along the Marion–Grundy County line on its way to the Interstate 24 (I-24) Exit 134 interchange. US 41A follows a westward path into Franklin County, connecting I-24 to Sewanee, Cowan, and Winchester. At Winchester, US 41A turns northwestward, bypassing Tims Ford Lake, Woods Reservoir, and Arnold Engineering Development Center before entering Coffee County and the city of Tullahoma. It has a brief concurrency with SR 55 before continuing northwest. US 41A then traverses northeastern Moore County before entering Bedford County and heading for Shelbyville.

=== Shelbyville to Nashville ===
From Shelbyville, US 41A continues northwest into the southwestern portion of Rutherford County and the city of Eagleville. Further north, it then enters eastern Williamson County, where it begins a concurrency with US 31A that lasts from just south of Triune near the I-840 Exit 42 interchange, through Nolensville, and into Davidson County and the Metro Nashville area.

=== Nashville to Pleasant View ===
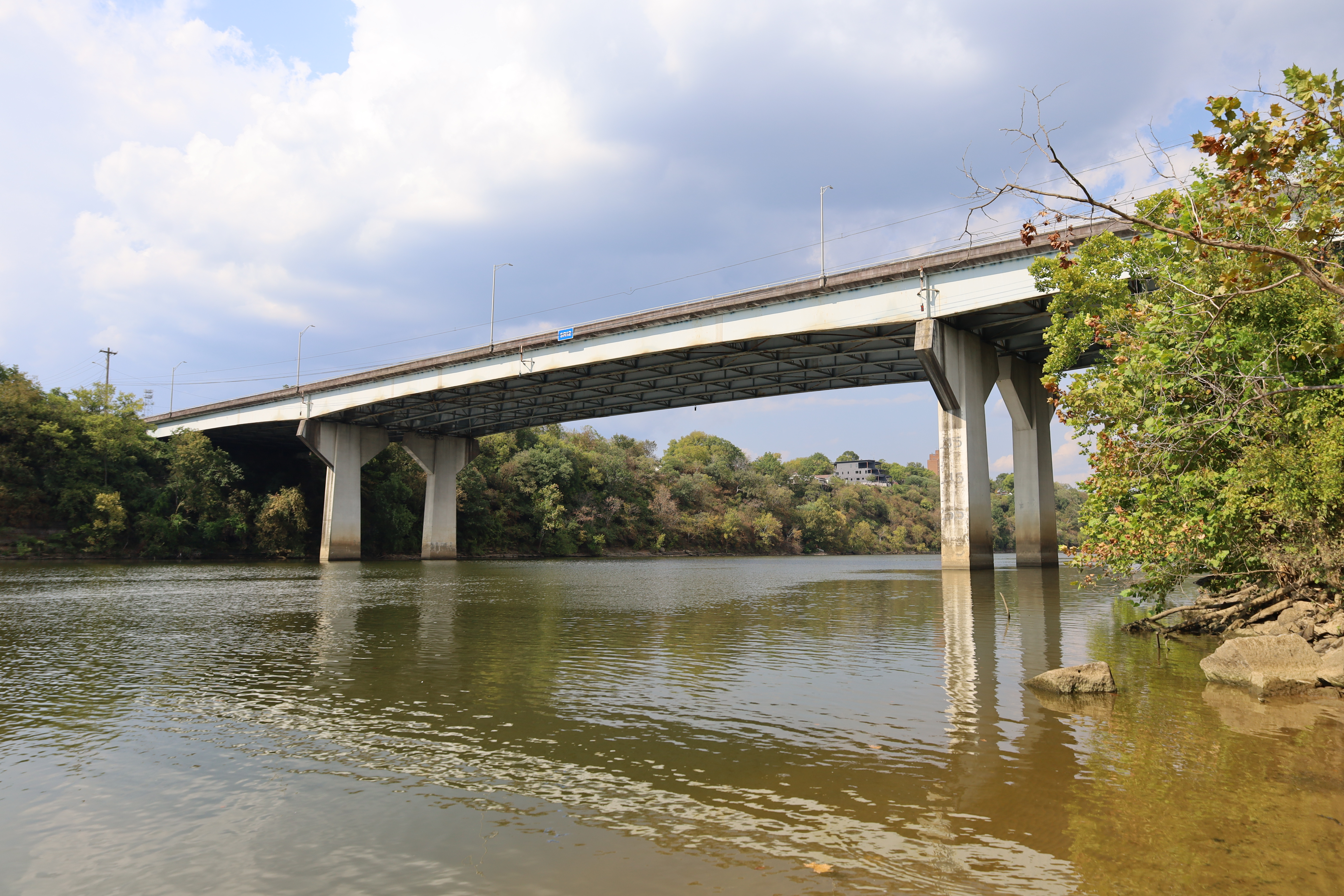
US 41A crosses the Cumberland River on the Martin Luther King Jr. Bridge in Nashville.

In downtown Nashville, US 31A ends, while US 41A continues and begins a brief concurrency with US 31, US 41, US 431, and SR 6 on Eighth Avenue. US 41A leaves the concurrency off James Robertson Parkway near the Nashville Farmer's Market, but then begins a concurrency with unsigned SR 12. US 41A/SR 12 follows Rosa L. Parks Boulevard through the Exit 85 interchange of I-65. After crossing the Cumberland River via the Hydes Ferry Bridge, SR 12 leaves the concurrency in the Bordeaux neighborhood. US 41A's continuation after that marks the eastern terminus of SR 112 as US 41A continues north, and then west-northwest into Cheatham and Robertson Counties, following the boundary between the two counties, and crossing it four times, intersecting SR 49 at Pleasant View before the third and fourth times.

=== Clarksville area ===
After crossing the Robertson-Cheatham County line for the final time, US 41A then enters Montgomery County and the city of Clarksville. After the first junction with US 41A Bypass and SR 76, it expands into four lanes. It goes right through the downtown core before crossing the Red River. SR 12, once again as a hidden route, rejoins US 41A at the US 41A Bypass/US 79/SR 76 junction. US 79/SR 76 leaves the concurrency, while US 41A/SR 12 continues northward, following the eastern boundary of the Fort Campbell Military Reservation to the Kentucky state line, where the Clarksville city limits border that of Oak Grove. The state line also marks SR 12's northern/western terminus.

=== Christian County, Kentucky ===
Once US 41A enters Christian County in Oak Grove, it is signed as US 41 Alternate (US 41 Alt.). After crossing I-24 for a final time, US 41A continues north to a junction with I-169 (former Pennyrile Parkway), and then ending with a junction with US 41/US 68/KY 80/KY 109 in downtown Hopkinsville.

== History ==
U.S. Route 41W
- Location: Nashville, Tennessee–Hopkinsville, Kentucky
- Existed: 1930–1943

Prior to 1930, from Nashville to Hopkinsville, the current US 41A corridor from Nashville to Hopkinsville was originally signed as US 41, while the current US 41 was signed as US 241.

In 1930, US 41 became US 41W, and US 241 (the current US 41 main alignment) was renumbered, and signed as US 41E. US 41W between Nashville and Clarksville followed the alignment of SR 12 until it was reallocated onto SR 112 some time between 1935 and 1938.

In 1943, the western route became US 41 Alternate, while the main alignment of US 41 was reallocated to the east route. From the decommissioning of US 41W, the route has been signed as US 41A.

== Major intersections ==
State	County	Location	mi	km	Destinations	Notes
Tennessee	Grundy–Marion county line	Monteagle	0.0	0.0	US 41 (Main Street/Dixie Highway/SR 2/SR 56 north) – Tracy City, Manchester	Southern terminus of US 41A; western terminus of unsigned SR 15; southern end of unsigned SR 15/SR 56 concurrency
Tennessee	Grundy–Marion county line	Monteagle	0.2– 0.5	0.32– 0.80	I-24 / US 64 – Nashville, Chattanooga	I-24 exit 134
Tennessee	Franklin	Saint Andrews	3.5	5.6	SR 156 south (Midway Road) – Franklin County Airport, Orme, South Pittsburg	St. Andrew's-Sewanee School north of intersection; northern terminus of SR 156; provides access to Franklin State Forest
Tennessee	Franklin	Sewanee	5.5	8.9	University Avenue – Sewanee: The University of the South, Sewanee	
Tennessee	Franklin	Sewanee	6.0	9.7	SR 56 south (Sherwood Road) – Sherwood	Northern end of wrong-way unsigned SR 56 concurrency; provides access to Sherwood Forest, Carter State Natural Area, and Sewanee Natural Bridge
Tennessee	Franklin	Winchester	15.3	24.6	Aviation Drive – Winchester Municipal Airport	
Tennessee	Franklin	Winchester	15.4– 15.5	24.8– 24.9	US 64 (Veterans Memorial Drive/SR 433) to I-24 – Tims Ford State Park, Fayetteville, Decherd	Interchange
Tennessee	Franklin	Winchester	18.1	29.1	SR 16 south / SR 50 west (1st Avenue Southwest/SR 15 west)	Southern end of SR 50 concurrency and unsigned SR 16 concurrency; northern end of unsigned SR 15 concurrency
Tennessee	Franklin	Decherd	19.8	31.9	SR 50 east (Main Street) to I-24	Northern end of SR 50 concurrency
Tennessee	Franklin	Decherd	20.8	33.5	SR 127 north (Aedc Road) – Hillsboro	Southern terminus of SR 127
Tennessee	Franklin	Estill Springs	25.0	40.2	SR 279 east (Spring Creek Road) – Franklin County Park, Elk River Dam	Western terminus of SR 279
Tennessee	Franklin	Estill Springs	26.5	42.6	UTSI Road – University of Tennessee Space Institute, Arnold Air Force Base	
Tennessee	Coffee	Tullahoma	32.1	51.7	SR 55 east (East Carroll Street) / SR 130 south (West Carroll Street) to I-24 – Arnold Air Force Base, Manchester	Southern end of SR 55 and SR 130 concurrencies; I-24 via 55 east
Tennessee	Coffee	Tullahoma	33.1	53.3	SR 55 west / SR 130 north (Wilson Avenue) – Lynchburg, Motlow State Community College	Northern end of SR 55 and SR 130 concurrencies
Tennessee	Coffee	Tullahoma	34.2	55.0	William Northern Boulevard – Tullahoma Regional Airport	
Tennessee	Coffee	Tullahoma	34.5	55.5	SR 269 north (Marbury Crossing) – Normandy, Wartrace	Harton Regional Medical Center west of this intersection
Tennessee	Moore	No major junctions				
Tennessee	Bedford		41.6	66.9	SR 276 south (Thompson Creek Road) – Raus	Northern terminus of SR 276
Tennessee	Bedford		46.0	74.0	SR 437 west (Shelbyville Bypass)	Eastern terminus of SR 437; northern and eastern bypass of Shelbyville
Tennessee	Bedford	Shelbyville	46.6	75.0	SR 64 (Wartrace Pike) to I-24 – Wartrace	
Tennessee	Bedford	Shelbyville	50.1	80.6	US 231 Bus. / SR 82 (Main Street/SR 10)	Former route of US 231; Bedford County Medical Center to the north
Tennessee	Bedford	Shelbyville	50.6	81.4	US 231 (Colloredo Boulevard/Lake Parkway/SR 387) – Fayetteville, Murfreesboro	
Tennessee	Bedford		57.8	93.0	SR 270 west (Old Columbia Road) – Chapel Hill	Eastern terminus of SR 270
Tennessee	Rutherford		70.0	112.7	SR 99 west (Chapel Hill Pike) – Chapel Hill	Southern end of SR 99 concurrency
Tennessee	Rutherford	Eagleville	71.0	114.3	SR 99 east / SR 269 east – Murfreesboro	Northern end of SR 99 concurrency; southern end of SR 269 concurrency
Tennessee	Rutherford	Eagleville	71.5	115.1	SR 269 west (Allisona Road) – Allisona	Northern end of SR 269 concurrency
Tennessee	Williamson	Kirkland	76.2	122.6	US 31A south (Horton Highway/SR 11 south) – Chapel Hill	Southern end of US 31A/SR 11 concurrency; northern terminus of unsigned SR 16
Tennessee	Williamson	Triune	79.0– 79.1	127.1– 127.3	I-840 – Murfreesboro, Franklin	I-840 exit 42; former SR 840
Tennessee	Williamson	Triune	79.6	128.1	SR 96 (Murfreesboro Road) – Franklin, Murfreesboro	
Tennessee	Davidson	Nashville	90.0	144.8	SR 253 west (Concord Road) – Brentwood	Eastern terminus of SR 253
Tennessee	Davidson	Nashville	93.8	151.0	SR 254 (Old Hickory Boulevard/Bell Road) – Brentwood, Antioch	
Tennessee	Davidson	Nashville	96.3	155.0	SR 255 (Harding Place) to I-65 / I-24 – Oak Hill, Donelson	Provides access to Nashville International Airport
Tennessee	Davidson	Nashville	98.8	159.0	SR 155 (Thompson Lane)	
Tennessee	Davidson	Nashville	99.5– 99.7	160.1– 160.5	I-440 – Memphis, Knoxville	I-440 exit 6
Tennessee	Davidson	Nashville	100.5	161.7	Wedgewood Road – Tennessee State Fairgrounds	
Tennessee	Davidson	Nashville	101.9	164.0	US 41 south / US 70S east (Lafayette Avenue/SR 1 east) / 2nd Avenue South to I-40	Southern end of US 41/US 70S concurrency; I-40 to the north via 2nd Avenue
Tennessee	Davidson	Nashville	102.1	164.3	I-40 to I-65	No entry to I-65 south from I-40 here; I-40 exit 210C
Tennessee	Davidson	Nashville	102.6	165.1	US 31 south (8th Avenue South/SR 6 south) / Korean Veterans Boulevard	Southern end of US 31 concurrency; roundabout; northern terminus of US 31A
Tennessee	Davidson	Nashville	102.9	165.6	US 70 / US 70S west / US 431 south (Broadway/SR 1 west/SR 24)	Northern end of US 70S concurency; southern end of US 431 concurrency
Tennessee	Davidson	Nashville	103.6	166.7	US 31 north / US 41 north / US 431 north (James Robertson Parkway/SR 6 north/SR 11 north)	Northern end of US 31/US 41/US 431 concurrency; southern terminus of unsigned SR 12; southern end of unsigned SR 12 concurrency
Tennessee	Davidson	Nashville	104.8– 105.0	168.7– 169.0	I-65 – Louisville, Huntsville	I-65 exit 85
Tennessee	Davidson	Nashville	106.8	171.9	Ed Temple Boulevard – Tennessee State University	
Tennessee	Davidson	Nashville	108.0	173.8	SR 12 north (Ashland City Highway) – Ashland City	Northern end of unsigned SR 12 concurrency; eastern terminus of unsigned SR 112; southern end of unsigned SR 112 concurrency
Tennessee	Davidson	Nashville	110.1– 110.4	177.2– 177.7	SR 155 (Briley Parkway)	Interchange; Briley Parkway exit 21 (21A/21B eastbound)
Tennessee	Cheatham		121.3	195.2	SR 249 (New Hope Road/Jackson Felts Road) to I-24 – Ashland City	
Tennessee	Robertson	No major junctions				
Tennessee	Cheatham	Pleasant View	128.0	206.0	SR 49 to I-24 – Ashland City, Coopertown, Springfield	
Tennessee	Robertson	No major junctions				
Tennessee	Cheatham		133.0	214.0	SR 256 north (Maxey Road) to I-24 – Adams	Southern terminus of SR 256
Tennessee	Montgomery	Clarksville	143.7	231.3	SR 76 east (M.L.K. Jr. Parkway) / US 41A Byp. north (Ashland City Road) to I-24 – Port Royal State Park	Southern end of unsigned SR 76 concurrency; southern terminus of US 41A Bypass; SR 76 changes from an east-west route to a north-south route
Tennessee	Montgomery	Clarksville	144.1	231.9	SR 374 north (Richview Road)	Southern terminus of SR 374; partial beltway around Clarksville
Tennessee	Montgomery	Clarksville	148.7	239.3	SR 48 north (College Street)	South end of SR 48 concurrency; Austin Peay State University directly north of intersection
Tennessee	Montgomery	Clarksville	149.1	240.0	SR 48 south (College Street) to US 41A Byp.	Northern end of SR 48 concurrency
Tennessee	Montgomery	Clarksville	149.9	241.2	US 79 north / US 41A Byp. south (Kraft Street/SR 12 south/SR 13)	Southern end of US 79 concurrency; northern terminus of US 41A Byp.; western terminus of unsigned SR 112; southern end of unsigned SR 12 concurrency
Tennessee	Montgomery	Clarksville	151.7	244.1	US 79 south (Dover Road/SR 76 south)	Northern end of US 79/SR 76 concurrency
Tennessee	Montgomery	Clarksville	154.1– 154.3	248.0– 248.3	SR 374 (101st Airborne Division Parkway) to I-24	Interchange; partial beltway around Clarksville
Tennessee	Montgomery	Clarksville	157.6	253.6	SR 236 east (Tinytown Road)	Western terminus of SR 236
			157.87 0.000	254.07 0.000	State line Northern terminus of unsigned SR 12	
Kentucky	Christian	Oak Grove	0.004	0.0064	KY 400 east (State Line Road)	Western terminus of KY 400
Kentucky	Christian	Oak Grove	0.268	0.431	Screaming Eagle Boulevard – Fort Campbell	Main entrance to the military base
Kentucky	Christian	Oak Grove	1.738	2.797	KY 911 east (Thompsonville Lane)	Western terminus of KY 911
Kentucky	Christian	Oak Grove	2.522	4.059	KY 788 west (Gate 7 Road) – Fort Campbell	Eastern terminus of KY 788
Kentucky	Christian	Oak Grove	3.967	6.384	KY 117 west (Henderson-Oak Grove Road)	Eastern terminus of KY 117
Kentucky	Christian	Oak Grove	4.424– 4.560	7.120– 7.339	I-24 – Nashville, Paducah	I-24 exit 86
Kentucky	Christian	Hopkinsville	5.744	9.244	KY 1453 (Elmo Road)	
Kentucky	Christian	Hopkinsville	6.656	10.712	KY 756 east (Fidello Road)	Western terminus of KY 756
Kentucky	Christian	Hopkinsville	9.002	14.487	KY 1027 (Long Pond Road)	
Kentucky	Christian	Hopkinsville	12.561	20.215	US 68 Byp. (Dr. Martin Luther King Way / Eagle Way) to US 41 Truck	
Kentucky	Christian	Hopkinsville	13.383– 13.571	21.538– 21.840	I-169 / US 41 Truck north to I-24 – Madisonville	Truck route via northbound I-169; former Pennyrile Parkway; I-169 exit 7
Kentucky	Christian	Hopkinsville	14.145	22.764	KY 380 east (Skyline Drive) to US 41	Southern end of KY 380 concurrency
Kentucky	Christian	Hopkinsville	14.410	23.191	KY 380 west (Country Club Lane)	Northern end of KY 380 concurrency
Kentucky	Christian	Hopkinsville	15.990	25.733	US 41 / US 68 / KY 80 / KY 109 (East 9th Street)	Northern terminus of US 41 Alt.
1.000 mi = 1.609 km; 1.000 km = 0.621 mi: Concurrency terminus; Incomplete access; Route transition

== Bypass ==
=== Clarksville ===
U.S. Route 41A Bypass
- Location: Clarksville, Tennessee

U.S. Route 41A Bypass (US 41A Byp.) is a bypass of the city of Clarksville, Tennessee, on its south side. It first splits off from the US 41A mainline at 2nd Street and Kraft, following Riverside Drive south, running concurrently with SR 13 and SR 12, along the Cumberland River to an intersection with SR 48 (College Street). It becomes concurrent with SR 48 and they travel south and leave town to an intersection with Cumberland Drive, where SR 13 and SR 48 split off to continue southward. The bypass then curves to the east, still following the river, and enters some neighborhoods and comes to an intersection with Ashland City Road, where SR 12 splits off and goes toward Ashland City. US 41A Byp. then continues east and comes to an end at an intersection with US 41A (Madison Street) and SR 76 (M.L.K. Jr. Bypass Parkway). Most of the road is a two-lane highway, occasionally widening to three lanes to accommodate truck traffic on hills.

== Tennessee State Route 112 ==
State Route 112
- Location: Clarksville–Nashville
- Length: 41.86 mi (67.37 km)

State Route 112 (SR 112) is the hidden, secret designation for U.S. Route 41A from the US 41A Bypass/US 79/SR 12/SR 13/SR 76 junction in Clarksville to the SR 12 junction in the Bordeaux neighborhood of Nashville.
