= Tennessee State Route 276 =

State highway in Tennessee, United States

State Route 276
- Thompson Creek Road
- SR 276 highlighted in red

Route information
- Maintained by TDOT
- Length: 3.2 mi (5.1 km)
- Existed: July 1, 1983–present

Major junctions
- South end: SR 130 in Raus
- North end: US 41A near Normandy

Location
- Country: United States
- State: Tennessee
- Counties: Bedford

Highway system
- Tennessee State Routes; Interstate; US; State
← SR 275	→ SR 277

State Route 276 (SR 276), also known as Thompson Creek Road, is a short 3.2-mile-long (5.1 km) north–south state highway in eastern Bedford County, Tennessee, United States. It connects the community of Raus, and SR 130, with U.S. Route 41A (US 41A). It is a two-lane highway for its entire length and traverses rural and flat farmland for the majority of its course.

== Major intersections ==
The entire route is in Bedford County.

Location	mi	km	Destinations	Notes
Raus	0.0	0.0	SR 130 – Shelbyville, Tullahoma	Southern terminus
	3.2	5.1	US 41A (SR 16) – Shelbyville, Tullahoma	Northern terminus
1.000 mi = 1.609 km; 1.000 km = 0.621 mi
