= Agricultural Wheel =

Cooperative alliance of farmers in the United States established in 1882

- Grand Agricultural Wheel
- Abbreviation: "the Wheel"
- Successor: Farmers' and Laborers' Union of America
- Founded: February 15, 1882
- Founders: Nine farmers led by W. W. Tedford, W. A. Suit and W. Taylor McBee
- Founded at: Prairie County, Arkansas
- Dissolved: 1889
- Merger of: Farmers' Alliance
- Purpose: U.S. agricultural union
- Origins: American farm discontent
- Region served: 11 states, mostly American South
- Subsidiaries: state and local Wheels
- Affiliations: Knights of Labor; National Union Labor Party; Union Labor Party of Arkansas
- Formerly called: Wattensas Farmers' Club

The Agricultural Wheel was a cooperative alliance of farmers in the United States. It was established in 1882 in Arkansas. A major founding organizers of the Agricultural Wheel was W. W. Tedford, an Arkansas farmer and school teacher. Like similar farmer organizations such as the Southern Farmers' Alliance, the Louisiana Farmers' Union, and the Brothers of Freedom, the Agricultural Wheel had been formed to expose and correct the injustices and oppressions done to the small farmers by merchants, grain elevators and the railroads. The Wheel promoted a radical agenda including currency expansion through free silver; closing all national banks; regulation or nationalization of the railroads, the telephones and the telegraph; allow only Americans to purchase public lands; impose an income tax on high incomes; and elect senators by popular election instead of by state legislatures. The Wheel encouraged farmers to join local cooperatives, avoid the debt cycle, and avoid one crop overemphasis on cotton.

== History ==
=== Founding and early history ===
On February 15, 1882, during a period of depressed farm prices and drought, a group of nine Arkansas farmers led by W. W. Tedford, W. A. Suit and W. Taylor McBee met at the McBee Schoolhouse eight miles south of Des Arc in Prairie County in eastern Arkansas and formed the Wattensas Farmers' Club. The club vowed to improve the lives of farmers, improve their education and knowledge, and improve communications between them. Many Arkansas farmers were suffering under what they viewed as oppressive mortgages (known as anaconda mortgages) and were heavily in debt. The Wheel's early platform reflected the prior work of The Grange, an earlier agricultural organization supporting producerism who had largely faded by 1882.

Within a short time it was suggested that the organization change its name. The choices were between "The Poor Man's Friend" and "The Agricultural Wheel" which was the name finally selected.

The situation did not improve in Arkansas that year and farmers were in such desperate straits that they called upon Governor of Arkansas Thomas J. Churchill to ask the legislature to postpone the collection of taxes.

By 1883 the organization consisted of over 500 members in Arkansas. At the organization's meeting in the spring a state Wheel was established and deputies were appointed to spread the word to neighboring states and seek to establish local wheels in those states. The Wheel was limited to white male farmers and mechanics engaged in agriculture.

=== Brothers of Freedom ===
In 1882, a separate but similar organization, known as the Brothers of Freedom was formed in Johnson County, Arkansas also seeking to increase the economic power of small farmers in opposition to monopolists and big business. One of the founders was Isaac McCracken, a farmer and former machinist and who had experience with labor unions in the Northern United States, including a membership in the Knights of Labor. Over time, the organization grew to attract former Grange and Greenback Party members in a sixteen-county area of northwestern Arkansas, where the rocky soil and hills was not conducive to cotton farming.

In October 1885 the Wheel absorbed the Brothers of Freedom by a vote of both organizations, becoming official in July 1886. McCracken would become president of the Wheel in 1886.

=== National organization ===
In 1886 delegates from Arkansas, Kentucky and Tennessee gathered at the town of Litchfield, Arkansas, to establish the National Agricultural Wheel and an official newspaper for the organization. The national organization allowed women into the organization, and the establishment of segregated Wheel lodges for non-white Wheelers, though members could attend white Wheel meetings as "guests". Among farmers' organizations of the period the Wheel was remarkable for refusal to hold racially segregated meetings, a policy it held until merger with the Farmers' Alliance.

By the time of the 1887 meeting, the membership of the national organization was over 500,000 farmers from Arkansas, Tennessee, Kentucky, Mississippi, Missouri, Indian Territory, and Wisconsin.

The growing political clout of the organization led it to promulgate a platform consisting of the following demands:

- Paying off the national debt
- Repeal of laws that favored capital over labor
- Preventing aliens from owning land
- Abolishing national banks
- Government operations on a cash basis
- Ending of agricultural futures trading
- Establishing a graduated income tax
- Prohibiting importation of foreign labor
- National ownership of transportation and communication
- Direct election of national politicians
- Free trade and removal of all import duties
- Establishment of a luxury tax
- Free public education
- No renewal of patents

In 1888 at the national meeting in Meridian, Mississippi a merger between the Wheel and the Farmers' Alliance was proposed. The two organizations met jointly in 1889 in Birmingham, Alabama and merged that same year.

== Merger ==
Centered largely in the state of Arkansas the Agricultural Wheel sought association with other farm protest organizations outside the state. Merger talks had begun as early as 1887 between these protest groups. Besides the similarity of their political goals the Agricultural Wheel and the other farm protest organization shared the same organizational structure. The Agricultural Wheel and the other farm protest organizations anticipating merger were organized on the basis of small clubs of farmers organized at the neighborhood level. Even organization at the county level had proved to be impractical. County level organization was too large and not "local enough." In the 1880s, small farmers rarely journeyed to the county seat of their home counties. The Agricultural Wheel continued to exist as a separate organization until 1889 when it merged with the National Farmers' Alliance to form the Farmers' and Laborers' Union of America.

Historian Theodore Saloutos wrote that:

the Agricultural Wheel was a protest against the effects of the Civil War and Reconstruction, the difficulties of a pioneer, primitive, sparsely-settled community attempting to adapt itself to a small-scale commercialized state of agriculture, the effects of one-crop farming, the share and crop-lean systems, lawlessness, and corruption in "high places."

== See also ==
- The Wheel Store: Cooperative store on the NRHP
- Wheel, Tennessee: Named after the organization
