= Flat Creek, Tennessee =

Unincorporated community in Tennessee, US

Coordinates: 35.3911873°N 86.4083265°W

Flat Creek is an unincorporated community in Bedford County, in the U.S. state of Tennessee. Flat Creek was also a historic town in Williamson County, Tennessee.

== History ==
The Flat Creek is a tributary off of the Duck River. The area lied in the Middle District of Tennessee when the state was first created in 1791. The early settlers were veterans of the Revolutionary War that received land for their military service.

The town of Flat Creek was laid out around 1840. A variant spelling was "Flatcreek". A post office called Flat Creek was established in 1833, the name was changed to Flatcreek in 1895, and the post office closed in 1937.

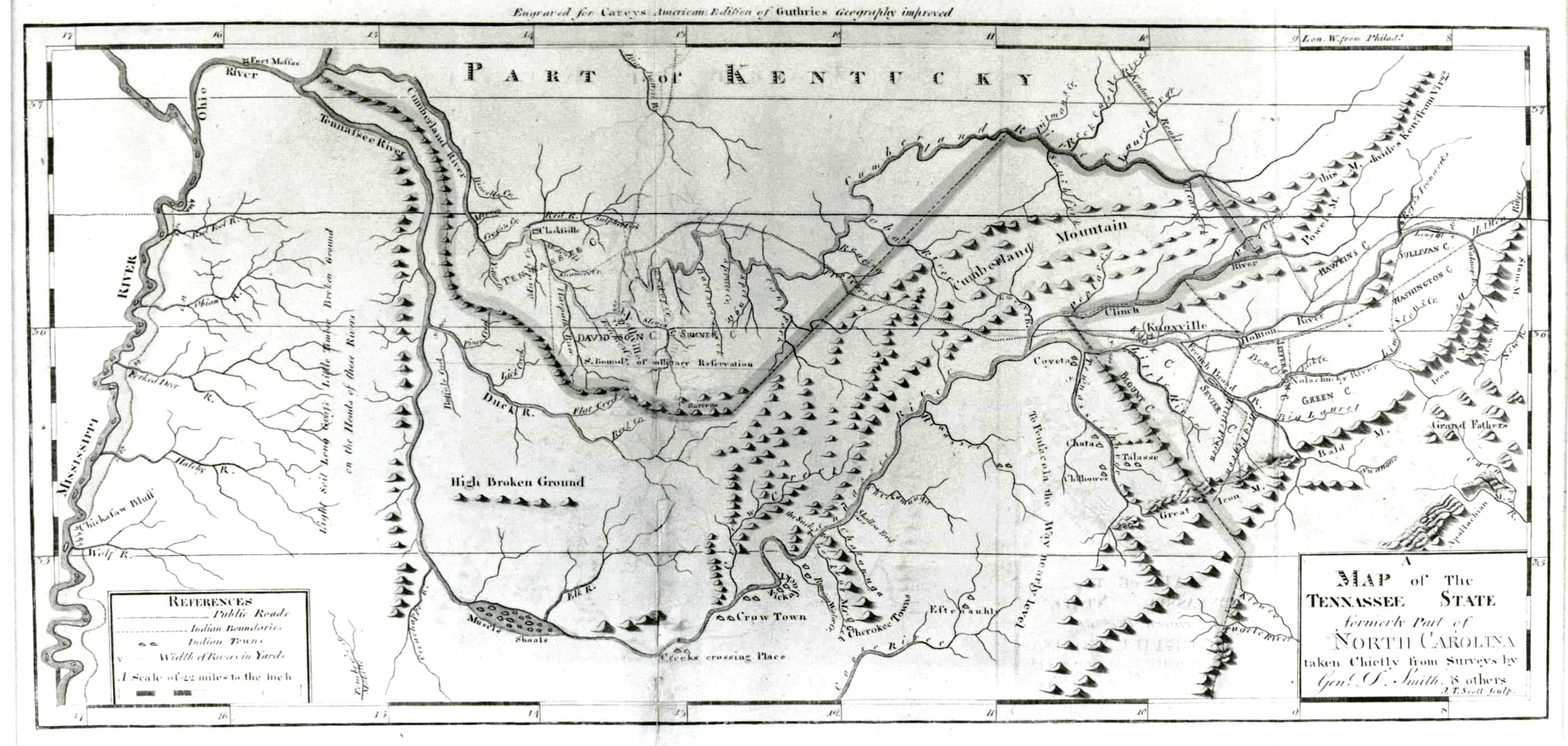
Map of Tennessee in 1796 showing Flat Creek in the Middle District
