= Bedford, Tennessee =

Unincorporated community in Tennessee, US

Coordinates: 35°27′49″N 86°34′25″W

Bedford is an unincorporated community in Bedford County, Tennessee, in the United States.

== History ==
A post office called Bedford was established in 1869, and remained in operation until it was discontinued in 1908. The community was likely named from Bedford County.
