= Bransford, Tennessee =

- Census-designated place
- Location within Tennessee
- Coordinates: 36°30′15″N 86°16′12″W
- Country: United States
- State: Tennessee
- County: Sumner

Area
  - Total: 4.03 sq mi (10.44 km^{2})
  - Land: 4.03 sq mi (10.44 km^{2})
  - Water: 0 sq mi (0.00 km^{2})
- Elevation: 571 ft (174 m)

Population (2020)
  - Total: 166
  - Density: 41.2/sq mi (15.91/km^{2})
- Time zone: UTC-6 (Central (CST))
  - Summer (DST): UTC-5 (CDT)
- ZIP Code: 37022
- Area code: 615
- GNIS feature ID: 1314725

Bransford is a census-designated place and unincorporated community in Sumner County, Tennessee, United States. Its population was 170 as of the 2010 census.

== Demographics ==
Historical population
Census	Pop.	Note	%±
2010	170		—
2020	166		−2.4%
U.S. Decennial Census: 2010;2020
