= Murfreesboro Municipal Airport =

Airport in Tennessee, United States

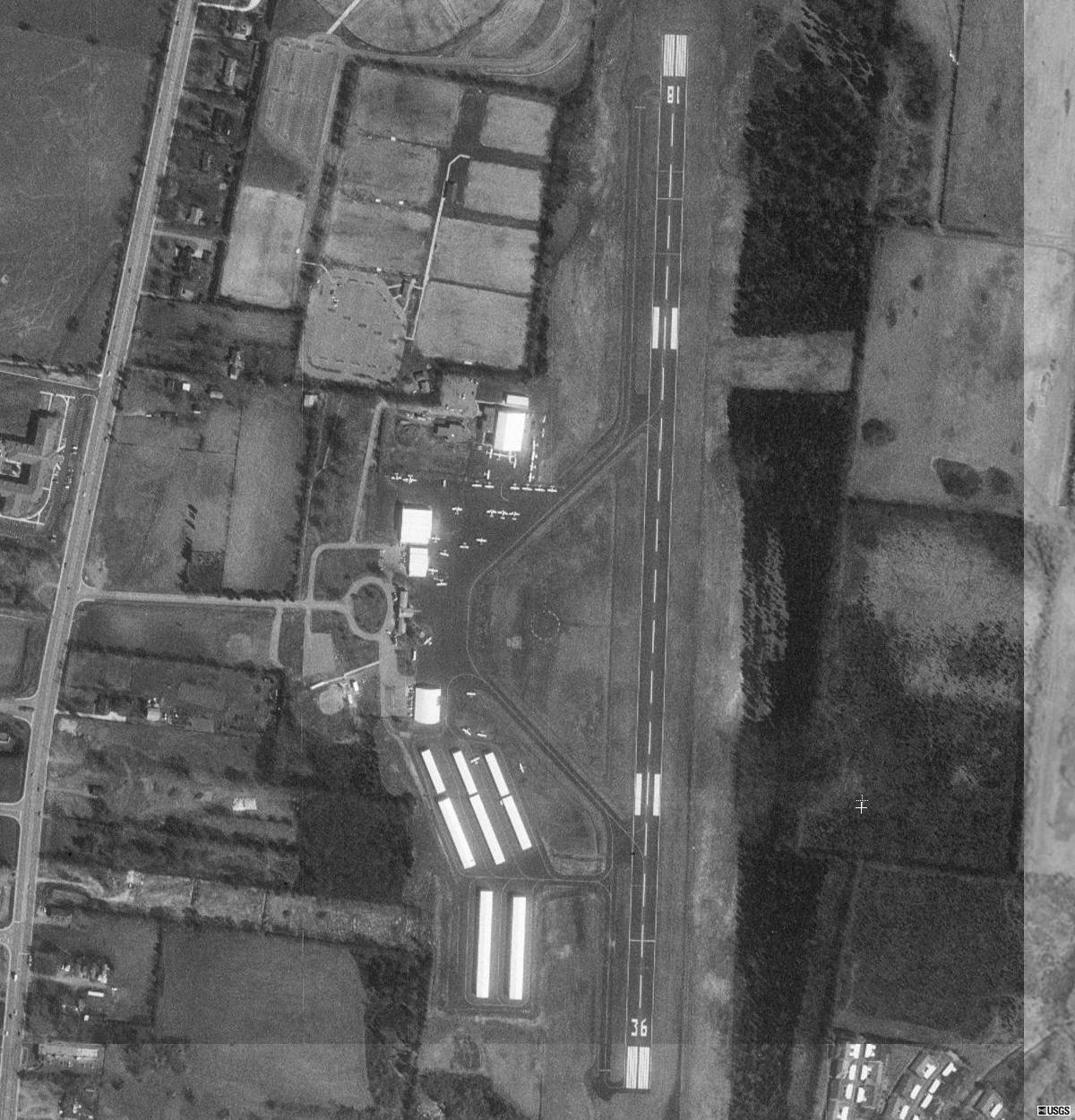
- USGS aerial image, March 1997
- IATA: none; ICAO: KMBT; FAA LID: MBT

Summary
- Airport type: Public
- Owner/Operator: City of Murfreesboro
- Serves: Murfreesboro, Tennessee
- Elevation AMSL: 614 ft / 187 m
- Coordinates: 35°52′39″N 086°22′39″W
- Website: Official website

Map
- Location of airport in Tennessee MBT (the United States)

Runways
Direction	Length		Surface
Direction	ft	m	Surface
18/36	4,753	1,449	Asphalt

Statistics (2022)
- Aircraft operations (year ending 6/30/2022): 87,015
- Based aircraft: 133
- Source: Federal Aviation Administration

Murfreesboro Municipal Airport (ICAO: KMBT, FAA LID: MBT) is a city-owned, public-use airport located two nautical miles (3.7 km) north of the central business district of Murfreesboro, a city in Rutherford County, Tennessee, United States. This airport is included in the National Plan of Integrated Airport Systems for 2011–2015, which categorized it as a general aviation airport. Although most U.S. airports use the same three-letter location identifier for the FAA and IATA, this airport is assigned MBT by the FAA, but has no designation from the IATA (which assigned MBT to Masbate Airport in the Philippines).

It is the home of the Middle Tennessee State University Aerospace Department, which has one of the largest university Air Traffic Collegiate Training Initiative (AT-CTI) programs in the country, and their aircraft and simulators. Aircraft owned by MTSU include 30 Diamond DA40s, a Diamond DA20, five Piper PA-44 Seminoles, a Piper PA-18 Super Cub, a de Havilland Canada DHC-2 Beaver, and a Beechcraft King Air 350.

The Murfreesboro Municipal Airport is one of the only general aviation airports in the State of Tennessee that does not receive tax payer money. The money used to maintain the airport is entirely generated by leases and fuel sales.

In 2007 the airport won the Tennessee Airport of the Year award.

== Aircraft ==
Murfreesboro Municipal Airport covers an area of 225 acres (91 ha) at an elevation of 614 feet (187 m) above mean sea level. It has one runway designated 18/36 with an asphalt surface measuring 4,753 by 100 feet (1,449 by 30 m).

For the 12-month period ending June 30, 2022, the airport had 87,015 aircraft operations, an average of 238 per day: 98% general aviation, 2% air taxi, and <1% military. At that time there were 133 aircraft based at this airport: 110 single-engine, 19 multi-engine, 3 jet, and 1 helicopter.

== See also ==
- List of airports in Tennessee
