= Bell Buckle, Tennessee =

- Town
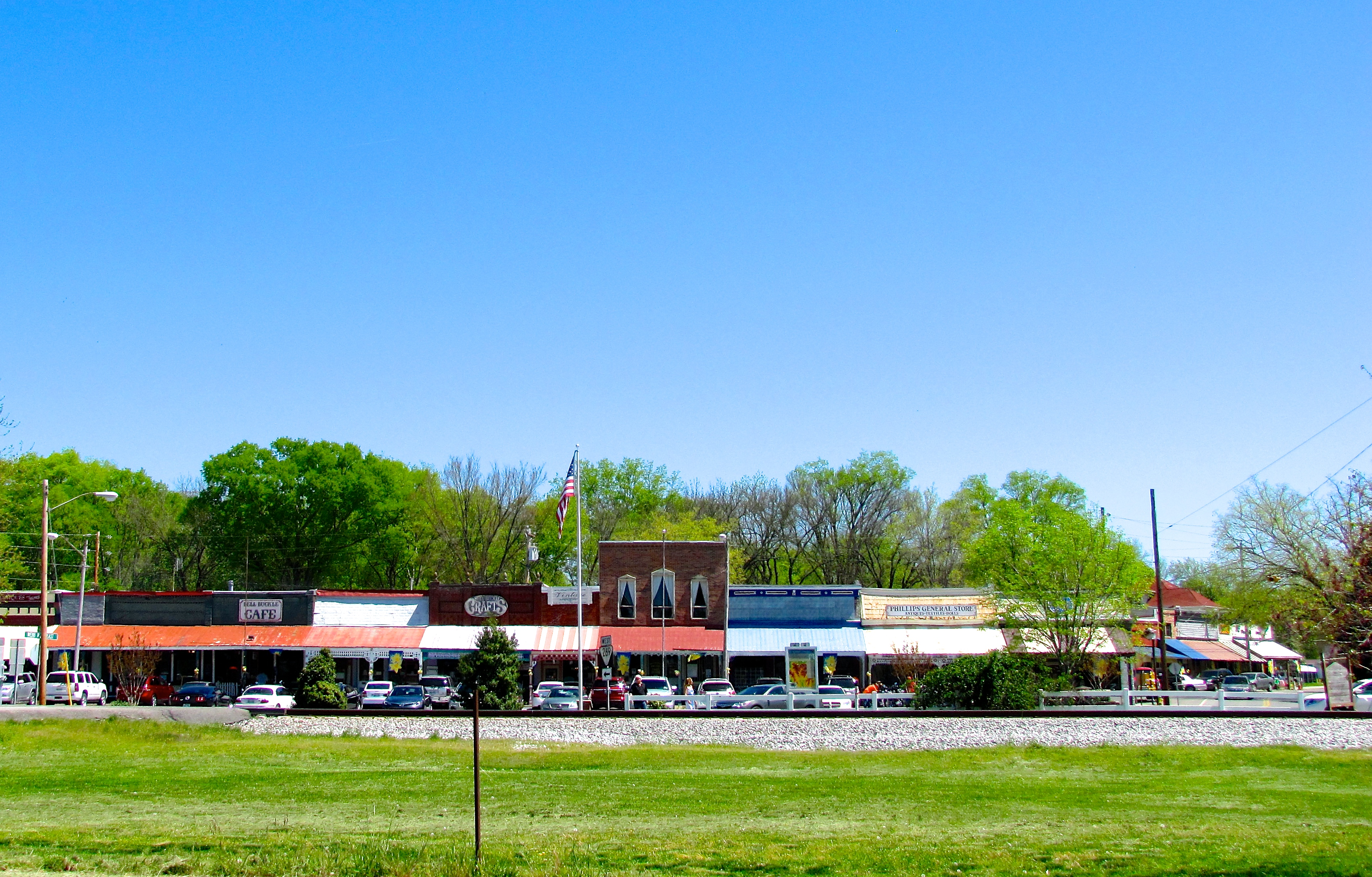
- Downtown Bell Buckle

- Location of Bell Buckle in Bedford County, Tennessee.
- Coordinates: 35°35′27″N 86°21′15″W
- Country: United States
- State: Tennessee
- County: Bedford

Government

Area
  - Total: 0.51 sq mi (1.32 km^{2})
  - Land: 0.51 sq mi (1.32 km^{2})
  - Water: 0 sq mi (0.00 km^{2})
- Elevation: 856 ft (261 m)

Population (2020)
  - Total: 410
  - Density: 804.5/sq mi (310.61/km^{2})
- Time zone: UTC-6 (Central (CST))
  - Summer (DST): UTC-5 (CDT)
- ZIP code: 37020
- Area code: 931
- FIPS code: 47-04460
- GNIS feature ID: 1276910
- Website: townofbellbuckle.com

Bell Buckle is a town in Bedford County, Tennessee, United States. The population was 410 at the 2020 census. The downtown area is listed on the National Register of Historic Places as the Bell Buckle Historic District.

== History ==
The origin of the town's unusual name is not known. According to the local chamber of commerce, one story says that one of the first white men to travel through the area found a tree with carvings of a cowbell and a buckle, possibly carved by Indians to warn white settlers away, or possibly carved by surveyors to mark the area as good pasture. Another form of the legend holds that a bell and buckle were tied around a tree. In any case, the nearby creek was named Bell Buckle Creek, and the town later took the name of the creek.

The Bell Buckle area was settled in the early 19th century. A bustling town grew up after the Nashville and Chattanooga Railroad came through the area in 1852. A railroad depot was built in 1853, and the town was incorporated in 1856. Bell Buckle had its period of greatest prosperity after about 1870, becoming the major stockyard between Nashville and Chattanooga and growing to a population of more than 1,000.

The town name was spelled Belle Buckle until the early 1900s, as that was the spelling by the post office and on cancellation devices (1896), by the Nashville, Chattanooga and St. Louis Railway on its 1903 route map, and on the sign on an undated photo of the train station. It is not known exactly when the spelling was changed to Bell Buckle, but it was sometime before 1935 when Tennessee started issuing delayed birth certificates for residents who needed them to apply for Social Security.

In June 1940, US Army maneuvers centered on the area. A tank of General George S. Patton's Second Armored Division ran into the two-story town hall, bringing the building down.

== Geography ==
Bell Buckle is located in northeastern Bedford County at 35°35′27″N 86°21′15″W (35.590749, -86.354047). Tennessee State Routes 82 and 269 cross at the town's center. TN 82 leads east 8 miles (13 km) to Beechgrove and Interstate 24, and west 5 miles (8 km) to U.S. Route 231 at a point 7 miles (11 km) north of Shelbyville, the county seat. TN 269 leads south 5 miles (8 km) to Wartrace and north 11 miles (18 km) to U.S. 231 near Christiana.

According to the United States Census Bureau, Bell Buckle has a total area of 0.58 square miles (1.5 km^{2}), all land.

== Demographics ==
Historical population
| Census | Pop. | Note | %± |
|---|---|---|---|
| 1880 | 298 | | — |
| 1890 | 715 | | 139.9% |
| 1900 | 665 | | −7.0% |
| 1910 | 466 | | −29.9% |
| 1920 | 471 | | 1.1% |
| 1930 | 378 | | −19.7% |
| 1940 | 355 | | −6.1% |
| 1950 | 341 | | −3.9% |
| 1960 | 318 | | −6.7% |
| 1970 | 393 | | 23.6% |
| 1980 | 450 | | 14.5% |
| 1990 | 326 | | −27.6% |
| 2000 | 391 | | 19.9% |
| 2010 | 500 | | 27.9% |
| 2020 | 410 | | −18.0% |

As of the census of 2000, there were 391 people, 167 households, and 105 families residing in the town. The population density was 813.6 inhabitants per square mile (314.1/km^{2}). There were 183 housing units at an average density of 380.8 per square mile (147.0/km^{2}). The racial makeup of the town was 97.95% White and 2.05% African American.

There were 167 households, out of which 25.7% had children under the age of 18 living with them, 50.9% were married couples living together, 9.0% had a female householder with no husband present, and 37.1% were non-families. 35.3% of all households were made up of individuals, and 13.2% had someone living alone who was 65 years of age or older. The average household size was 2.24 and the average family size was 2.91.

In the town, the population was spread out, with 19.7% under the age of 18, 9.5% from 18 to 24, 26.1% from 25 to 44, 28.1% from 45 to 64, and 16.6% who were 65 years of age or older. The median age was 42 years. For every 100 females, there were 109.1 males. For every 100 females age 18 and over, there were 107.9 males.

The median income for a household in the town was $27,188, and the median income for a family was $40,000. Males had a median income of $30,417 versus $15,556 for females. The per capita income for the town was $16,235. About 8.2% of families and 15.6% of the population were below the poverty line, including 3.4% of those under age 18 and 18.3% of those age 65 or over.

=== 2010 census ===
The 2010 census showed the population of Bell Buckle to have risen to 500 people, with a total population growth of 27.9%. The census documented 62.8% of the population as being 18 years of age or above, and 37.2% as under 18. The racial makeup of the town was 84.8% White, 8.2% Asian, 3.2% Hispanic, 2.8% African American and 1% from two or more races.

The 2010 census documented 164 housing units, 87.2% of which were occupied, and 12.8% were vacant.

== Sightseeing and tourism ==
Bell Buckle is noted for the many preserved and restored Victorian homes, shops, and churches located in and around downtown. Bell Buckle is a center for antiques, quilts, and various handmade crafts. The town hosts two yearly festivals: the RC Cola & Moon Pie festival and the Webb School Arts & Crafts Fair.

A member of Tennessee Backroads, Bell Buckle has the distinction of being the smallest town in Tennessee to be a Tree City USA. Bell Buckle is the home of The Webb School (which relocated from Culleoka in 1886), a college preparatory boarding and day school which plays an integral part in the ambience of the town.

== Notable residents ==
- Molly Bee, country music singer – On January 11, 1975, on Hee Haw, Molly Bee saluted her home town of Bell Buckle, population 393.
- Keon Johnson, basketball player – Johnson was born in nearby Shelbyville and played basketball for The Webb School in Bell Buckle and played one season with the University of Tennessee Volunteers prior to being drafted by the New York Knicks of the National Basketball Association with the 21st pick of the 2021 NBA draft. The Knicks subsequently traded Johnson to the Los Angeles Clippers, with whom he made his NBA debut during the 2021–22 season.
- Gary "Lazarus Lake" Cantrell, designer and director of endurance races, including Barkley Marathons and Big's Backyard Ultra.
- Holly Finley, professional disc golfer and model is from Bell Buckle.
- Margaret Britton Vaughn, Poet Laureate of Tennessee and Bell Buckle resident.
