= Shelbyville Municipal Airport (Tennessee) =

Shelbyville Municipal Airport Bomar Field
- IATA: SYI; ICAO: KSYI; FAA LID: SYI

Summary
- Airport type: Public
- Owner: City of Shelbyville
- Serves: Shelbyville, Tennessee
- Elevation AMSL: 801 ft / 244 m
- Coordinates: 35°33′34″N 086°26′33″W

Map
- Location of airport in Tennessee SYI (the United States)

Runways
Direction	Length		Surface
Direction	ft	m	Surface
18/36	5,503	1,677	Asphalt

Statistics (2004)
- Aircraft operations: 38,000
- Based aircraft: 52
- Source: Federal Aviation Administration

Shelbyville Municipal Airport (IATA: SYI, ICAO: KSYI, FAA LID: SYI) is a city-owned public-use airport located four miles (6 km) north of the central business district of Shelbyville, a city in Bedford County, Tennessee, United States.

In 2022, Middle Tennessee State University announced it would relocate its aviation training from Murfreesboro Municipal Airport to Shelbyville, investing $62 million in the project.

== Facilities and aircraft ==
Shelbyville Municipal Airport covers an area of 604 acres (244 ha) and contains one asphalt paved runway designated 18/36 which measures 5,503 x 100 ft (1,677 x 30 m).

For the 12-month period ending August 31, 2025, the airport had 63,782 aircraft operations, an average of 175 per day: 98% general aviation, 2% air taxi and <1% military. There are 68 aircraft based at this airport: 92% single-engine, 2% multi-engine, 4% helicopter and 2% ultralight.

== See also ==
- List of airports in Tennessee
