= Fosterville, Tennessee =

- Unincorporated community
- Location within Tennessee Location within the United States
- Coordinates: 35°39′18″N 86°24′11″W
- Country: United States
- State: Tennessee
- County: Rutherford
- Elevation: 850 ft (260 m)
- Time zone: UTC-6 (Central (CST))
  - Summer (DST): UTC-5 (CDT)
- ZIP code: 37063
- Area code: 615
- GNIS feature ID: 1284707

Fosterville is an unincorporated community in Rutherford County, Tennessee, United States. Its ZIP code is 37063.

A post office called Fosterville was in operation since 1837 but was discontinued on 5/21/2011. Besides the post office, Fosterville also contained a country store.
