= Bedford County, Tennessee =

County in Tennessee, United States

- County
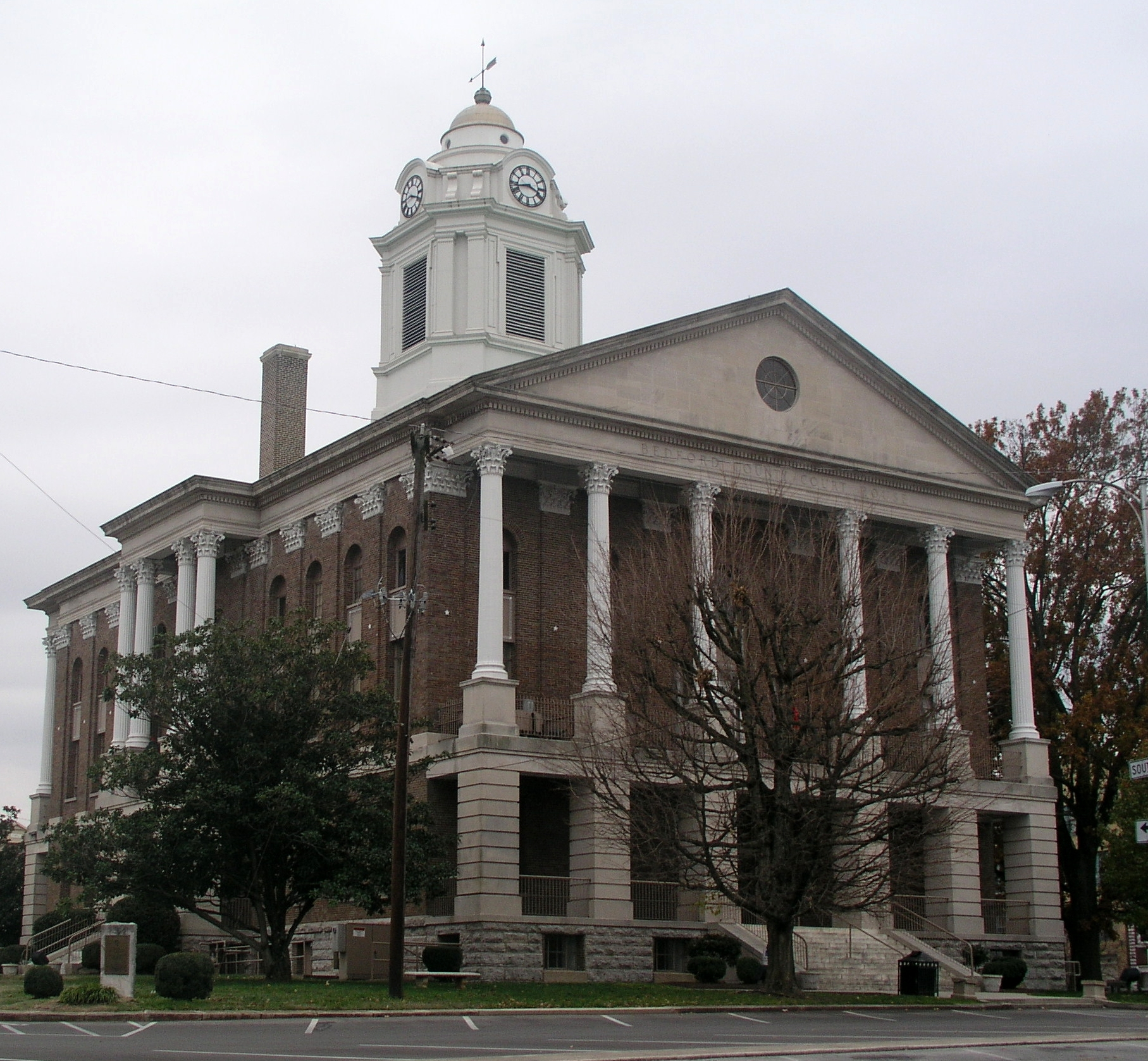
- Bedford County Courthouse in Shelbyville

- Seal

- Location within the U.S. state of Tennessee
- Coordinates: 35°31′N 86°28′W
- Country: United States
- State: Tennessee
- Founded: December 7, 1807
- Named for: Thomas Bedford
- Seat: Shelbyville
- Largest city: Shelbyville

Area
  - Total: 475 sq mi (1,230 km^{2})
  - Land: 474 sq mi (1,230 km^{2})
  - Water: 1.2 sq mi (3.1 km^{2}) 0.2%

Population (2020)
  - Total: 50,237
  - Estimate (2025): 55,273 ▲
  - Density: 105.99/sq mi (40.92/km^{2})
- Time zone: UTC−6 (Central)
  - Summer (DST): UTC−5 (CDT)
- Congressional district: 4th
- Website: www.bedfordcountytn.gov

Bedford County is a county located in the southern middle part of the U.S. state of Tennessee. As of the 2020 census, the population was 50,237. Its county seat is Shelbyville. Bedford County comprises the Shelbyville, TN Micropolitan Statistical Area, which is also included in the Nashville-Davidson–Murfreesboro, TN Combined Statistical Area.

== History ==
The county was created in 1807 when the citizens of Rutherford County living south of the Duck River and the Stones River successfully petitioned the governor to split Rutherford County in two. The new county was named after American Revolutionary War officer and large landowner in the area, Thomas Bedford.

Once the state's largest and most populous county, Bedford County's size (in terms of area) has been steadily reduced since 1809 to form Coffee County, Moore County, Lincoln County, and Marshall County.

The county was pro-Confederate during the Civil War, but Shelbyville was mostly loyal to the Union.

Texas pioneer William Whitaker Reed was born in Bedford County in 1816.

== Geography ==
According to the U.S. Census Bureau, the county has a total area of 475 square miles (1,230 km^{2}), of which 474 square miles (1,230 km^{2}) is land and 1.2 square miles (3.1 km^{2}) (0.2%) is water.

=== Adjacent counties ===
- Rutherford County (north)
- Coffee County (east)
- Moore County (southeast)
- Lincoln County (south)
- Marshall County (west)

=== State protected areas ===
- Normandy Wildlife Management Area (part)

== Demographics ==
Historical population
Census	Pop.	Note	%±
1810	8,242		—
1820	16,012		94.3%
1830	30,396		89.8%
1840	20,546		−32.4%
1850	21,511		4.7%
1860	21,584		0.3%
1870	24,333		12.7%
1880	26,025		7.0%
1890	24,739		−4.9%
1900	23,845		−3.6%
1910	22,667		−4.9%
1920	21,737		−4.1%
1930	21,077		−3.0%
1940	23,151		9.8%
1950	23,627		2.1%
1960	23,150		−2.0%
1970	25,039		8.2%
1980	27,916		11.5%
1990	30,411		8.9%
2000	37,586		23.6%
2010	45,058		19.9%
2020	50,237		11.5%
2025 (est.)	55,273	▲	10.0%
U.S. Decennial Census; 1790-1960 1900-1990; 1990-2000 2010-2014

=== Racial and ethnic composition ===
Bedford County, Tennessee – Racial and ethnic composition Note: the US Census treats Hispanic/Latino as an ethnic category. This table excludes Latinos from the racial categories and assigns them to a separate category. Hispanics/Latinos may be of any race.
Race / Ethnicity (NH = Non-Hispanic)	Pop 1980	Pop 1990	Pop 2000	Pop 2010	Pop 2020	% 1980	% 1990	% 2000	% 2010	% 2020
White alone (NH)	24,731	27,005	31,060	35,389	36,499	88.59%	88.80%	82.64%	78.54%	72.65%
Black or African American alone (NH)	2,971	3,056	3,152	3,437	3,563	10.64%	10.05%	8.39%	7.63%	7.09%
Native American or Alaska Native alone (NH)	14	34	80	96	127	0.05%	0.11%	0.21%	0.21%	0.25%
Asian alone (NH)	18	141	160	339	337	0.06%	0.46%	0.43%	0.75%	0.67%
Native Hawaiian or Pacific Islander alone (NH)	x	x	17	30	13	x	x	0.05%	0.07%	0.03%
Other race alone (NH)	11	3	18	49	140	0.04%	0.01%	0.05%	0.11%	0.28%
Mixed race or Multiracial (NH)	x	x	288	635	1,893	x	x	0.77%	1.41%	3.77%
Hispanic or Latino (any race)	171	172	2,811	5,083	7,665	0.61%	0.57%	7.48%	11.28%	15.26%
Total	27,916	30,411	37,586	45,058	50,237	100.00%	100.00%	100.00%	100.00%	100.00%

=== 2020 census ===
As of the 2020 census, there were 50,237 people and 12,704 families residing in the county. The median age was 38.0 years, with 25.0% of residents under the age of 18 and 15.7% of residents 65 years of age or older. For every 100 females there were 98.6 males, and for every 100 females age 18 and over there were 97.0 males age 18 and over.

There were 18,350 households in the county, of which 34.6% had children under the age of 18 living in them. Of all households, 48.5% were married-couple households, 18.0% were households with a male householder and no spouse or partner present, and 25.8% were households with a female householder and no spouse or partner present. About 24.4% of all households were made up of individuals and 11.2% had someone living alone who was 65 years of age or older. There were 19,685 housing units, of which 6.8% were vacant. Among occupied housing units, 69.2% were owner-occupied and 30.8% were renter-occupied. The homeowner vacancy rate was 1.4% and the rental vacancy rate was 5.3%.

The racial makeup of the county was 75.6% White, 7.2% Black or African American, 0.8% American Indian and Alaska Native, 0.7% Asian, 0.1% Native Hawaiian and Pacific Islander, 9.0% from some other race, and 6.5% from two or more races. Hispanic or Latino residents of any race comprised 15.3% of the population.

44.9% of residents lived in urban areas, while 55.1% lived in rural areas.

=== 2000 census ===
As of the census of 2000, there were 37,586 people, 13,905 households, and 10,345 families residing in the county. The population density was 79 people per square mile (31 people/km^{2}). There were 14,990 housing units at an average density of 32 per square mile (12/km^{2}). The racial makeup of the county was 86.84% White, 11.48% Black or African American, 0.28% Native American, 0.45% Asian, 0.05% Pacific Islander, 2.73% from other races, and 1.16% from two or more races. 7.48% of the population were Hispanic or Latino of any race.

There were 13,905 households, out of which 34.00% had children under the age of 18 living with them, 57.30% were married couples living together, 11.90% had a female householder with no husband present, and 25.60% were non-families. 21.50% of all households were made up of individuals, and 9.20% had someone living alone who was 65 years of age or older. The average household size was 2.67 and the average family size was 3.06.

In the county, the population was spread out, with 25.80% under the age of 18, 9.90% from 18 to 24, 29.70% from 25 to 44, 22.00% from 45 to 64, and 12.70% who were 65 years of age or older. The median age was 35 years. For every 100 females there were 98.40 males. For every 100 females age 18 and over, there were 97.00 males.

The median income for a household in the county was $36,729, and the median income for a family was $33,691. Males had a median income of $25,485 versus $15,673 for females. The per capita income for the county was $13,698. About 12.70% of families and 25.10% of the population were below the poverty line, including 15.90% of those under age 18 and 17.80% of those age 65 or over.

== Communities ==
=== City ===
- Shelbyville (county seat)

=== Towns ===
- Bell Buckle
- Normandy
- Wartrace

=== Census-designated place ===
- Unionville

=== Unincorporated communities ===
- Branchville
- Bugscuffe
- Center Grove
- Corner's Station
- Fairfield
- Fall Creek
- Flat Creek
- Haley's Station
- Hawthorne
- Mount Hermon
- Palmetto
- Poplin's Crossroads
- Raus
- Richmond
- Roseville
- Rover
- Wheel
- Royal

=== Major highways ===
- Interstate 24
- U.S. Route 41A
- U.S. Route 231
- State Route 16
- State Route 64
- State Route 82
- State Route 130
- State Route 269
- State Route 270
- State Route 276
- State Route 437

== Politics ==
United States presidential election results for Bedford County, Tennessee
Year	Republican		Democratic		Third party(ies)	
Year	No.	%	No.	%	No.	%
1912	1,474	37.98%	2,305	59.39%	102	2.63%
1916	1,324	33.92%	2,578	66.05%	1	0.03%
1920	2,056	48.51%	2,182	51.49%	0	0.00%
1924	925	33.23%	1,799	64.62%	60	2.16%
1928	1,405	47.84%	1,532	52.16%	0	0.00%
1932	630	21.74%	2,264	78.12%	4	0.14%
1936	514	17.36%	2,428	82.00%	19	0.64%
1940	555	18.05%	2,499	81.29%	20	0.65%
1944	733	21.51%	2,651	77.81%	23	0.68%
1948	771	17.93%	2,393	55.64%	1,137	26.44%
1952	2,611	37.44%	4,362	62.56%	0	0.00%
1956	2,258	33.08%	4,517	66.18%	50	0.73%
1960	2,633	36.81%	4,457	62.32%	62	0.87%
1964	2,272	28.83%	5,610	71.17%	0	0.00%
1968	1,870	22.30%	2,416	28.81%	4,099	48.88%
1972	4,262	59.73%	2,565	35.95%	308	4.32%
1976	3,023	29.19%	7,228	69.79%	106	1.02%
1980	3,377	35.24%	5,987	62.48%	219	2.29%
1984	4,699	50.55%	4,499	48.40%	98	1.05%
1988	4,856	54.32%	4,046	45.26%	37	0.41%
1992	3,836	33.59%	5,978	52.34%	1,607	14.07%
1996	4,634	41.07%	5,735	50.82%	915	8.11%
2000	5,911	48.42%	6,136	50.27%	160	1.31%
2004	8,351	60.93%	5,268	38.44%	87	0.63%
2008	10,217	65.89%	5,027	32.42%	263	1.70%
2012	10,034	69.46%	4,211	29.15%	200	1.38%
2016	11,486	74.80%	3,395	22.11%	474	3.09%
2020	14,354	75.20%	4,453	23.33%	281	1.47%
2024	15,772	78.51%	4,122	20.52%	196	0.98%

== Education ==
Bedford County Schools .

== See also ==
- National Register of Historic Places listings in Bedford County, Tennessee
- List of counties in Tennessee
