= Templeton Library =

Building in Sewanee, Tennessee, United States

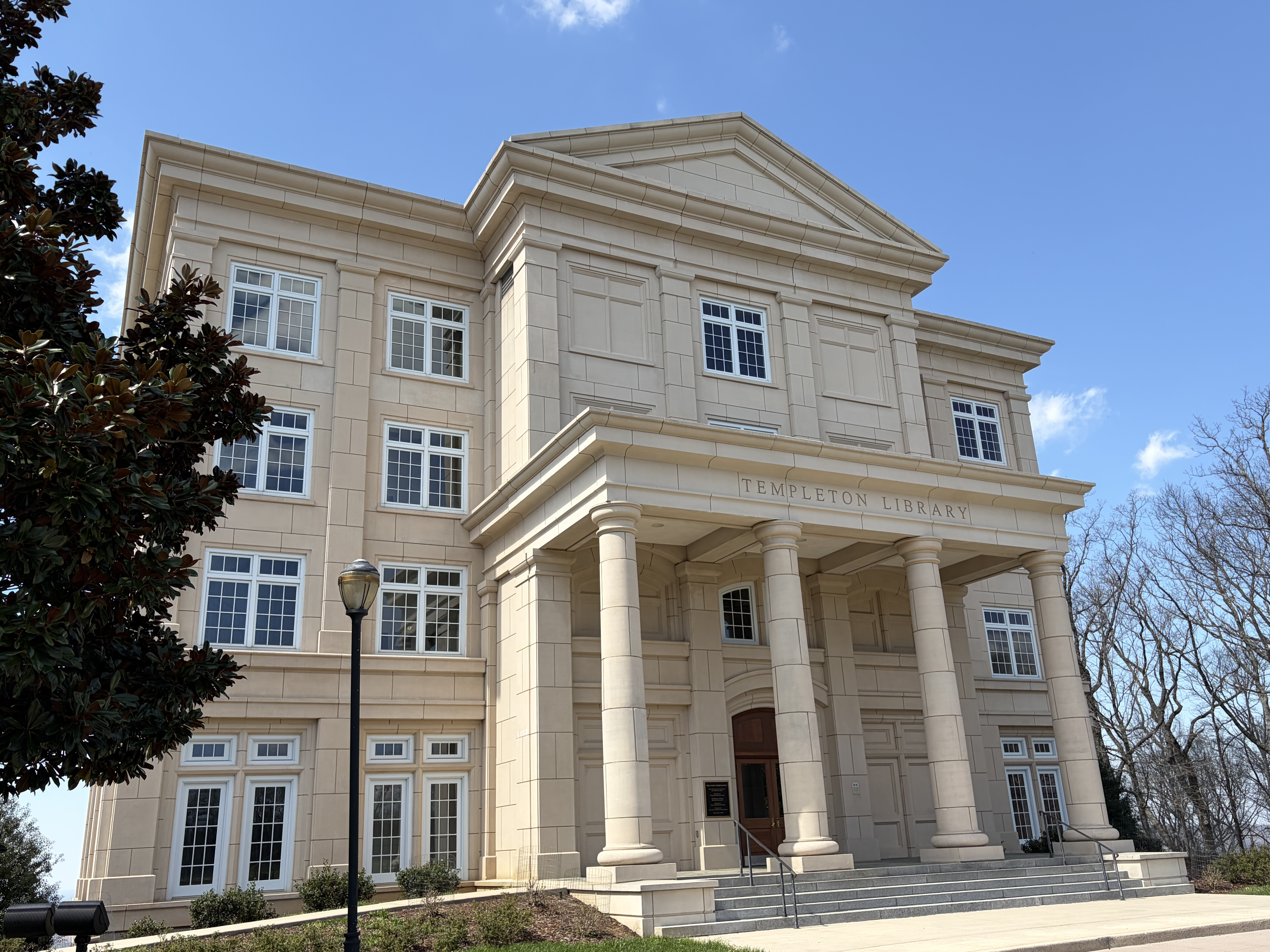
- The Templeton Library in 2026
- Interactive map of the Templeton Library area

General information
- Architectural style: Neoclassical
- Location: 730 Templeton Way, Sewanee, Tennessee, US
- Coordinates: 35°10′14″N 85°57′14″W
- Estimated completion: 2000
- Cost: $4,600,000 (equivalent to $8,600,000 in 2025)

The Templeton Library is a building in Sewanee, Tennessee, United States. It is located on a prominent bluff atop the Cumberland Plateau. It was built by investor and philanthropist John Templeton, a native of the region, and was intended to be a library dedicated to studying the relationship between science and religion. Since his death in 2008, the Templeton Library has not operated as a library and, as of 2023, was being used for private apartments, while the grounds remain open to the public.

== History ==
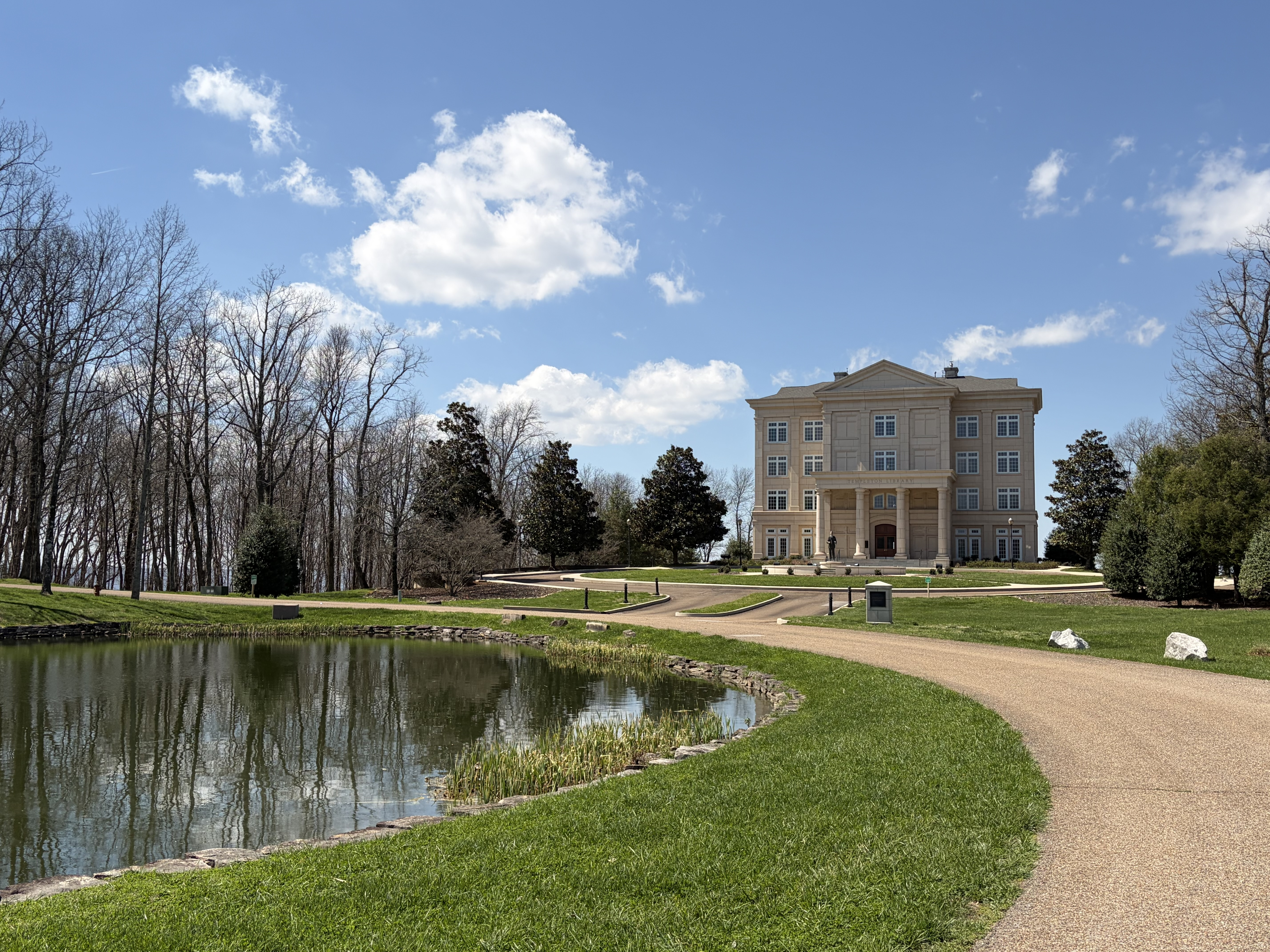
The Templeton Library viewed from its entrance drive

John Templeton, an investor and philanthropist who founded the John Templeton Foundation and established the Templeton Prize, owned approximately 1,100 acres (450 ha) in Franklin County, Tennessee, where he was born and raised. He wanted to build "a library for centuries to come" in his home area. The purpose of the library was to facilitate studies in his key interest: the intersection of science and religion. "A huge amount of information is accumulating," Templeton told The Tennessean. "But it will take a century or two to bear fruit." The library was also designed to become a repository for Templeton's writing and to include some apartments available to faculty and researchers.

Templeton purchased a site on the crest of the Cumberland Plateau near the Community of St. Mary's conference center, overlooking the highway from Sewanee to Winchester. The building was nearing completion in August 2000. Templeton said in 2000 that the library would likely be open to the public at some point.

On October 11, 2001, a group of students at the nearby University of the South broke into the locked library after midnight. A freshman from Vermont named Wesley Mitchell slid through an opening he thought was a laundry chute. The opening led to a motion-activated trash compactor, which turned on and crushed Mitchell to death. Mitchell's death was a traumatic event for many students and faculty at Sewanee.

After Templeton's death in 2008, the planned collection did not arrive. In 2019, a spokesman said the Templeton Foundation planned to open part of the library to the public in the future. As of 2023, the building had not opened to the public and had private apartments available for rent.

== Architecture and grounds ==
The library was designed in a classical style. The grounds of the library include a paved oval-shaped drive and a life-size bronze statue of Templeton. The grounds are open to the public and include accessible overlooks of the valley below, benches and a reflecting pool.
