= John Templeton Jr. =

American physician and philanthropist (1940–2015)

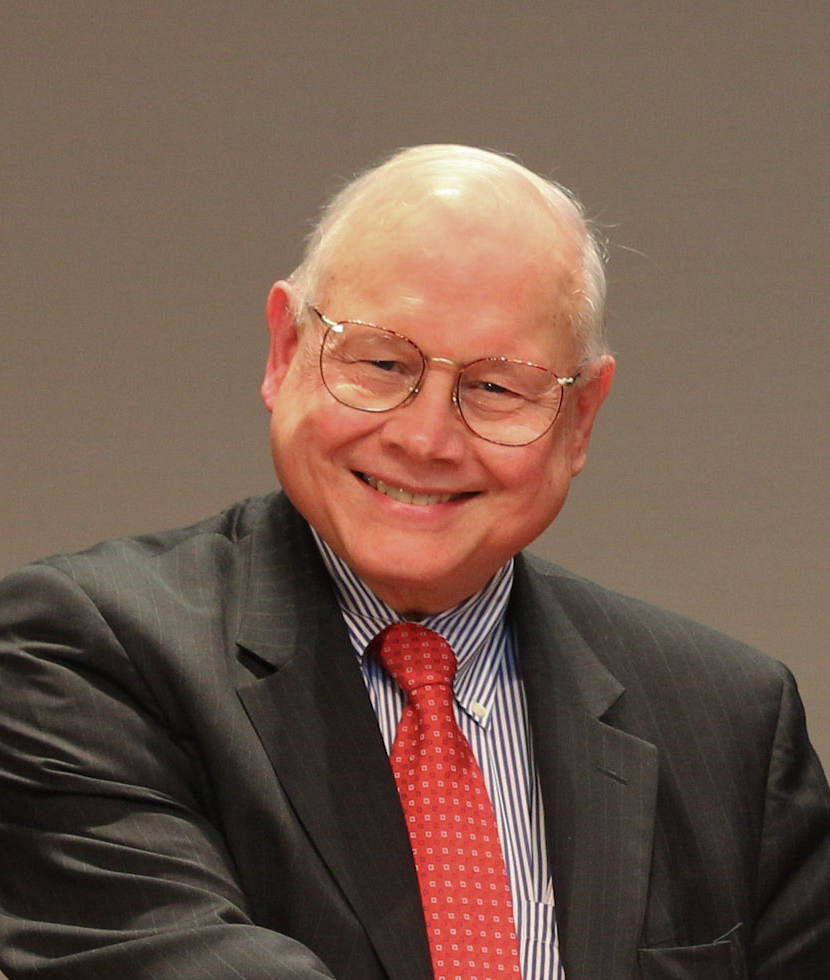
- Templeton Jr. in 2012
- Born: John Marks Templeton Jr. February 19, 1940; New York City, New York, U.S.
- Died: May 16, 2015 (aged 75); Bryn Mawr, Pennsylvania, U.S.
- Education: Yale University; Harvard University
- Employer: Children's Hospital of Philadelphia
- Organization: John Templeton Foundation
- Children: Heather and Jennifer

John Marks Templeton Jr. (February 19, 1940 – May 16, 2015), also known as Jack Templeton, was an American physician. The elder son of Judith (née Folk) Templeton and investor, businessman and philanthropist Sir John Templeton, Jack Templeton served as the Chairman and President of the John Templeton Foundation.

== Early life, education, and career ==
Templeton was born in New York City and graduated from Yale University, where he was a member of Elihu senior society, as was his father. He later earned a medical degree at Harvard Medical School, and then served as a physician in the U.S. Navy. In 1977, he went to work at the Children's Hospital of Philadelphia as a pediatric surgeon and trauma program director. His wife Josephine was a pediatric anesthesiologist at the same hospital.

He retired in 1995, as chief of pediatric surgery at Children's Hospital of Philadelphia to join the John Templeton Foundation and took over the leadership when his father died in 2008.

Also in the 1990s Templeton was featured on an episode of Rescue 911

Templeton was an evangelical Christian and an elder in the Presbyterian Church in America. The Templeton Honors College at Eastern University is named in his honor. He was a substantial contributor to conservative causes. In 2008, he donated $450,000 to the National Organization for Marriage, and his wife, Josephine, contributed $100,000. In 2009, he donated $300,000, again to the National Organization For Marriage. In a Philadelphia Inquirer article it was asserted that the Templetons had, between John and his wife, Josephine, donated $1 million to parties opposing same-sex marriage.

In 2010, Politics Magazine had named Templeton as one of the most influential Republicans in Pennsylvania.

Templeton died on May 16, 2015, from brain cancer in Bryn Mawr, Pennsylvania. Survivors include his wife, Josephine (Pina) Gargiulo Templeton, whom he married in 1970; two daughters, Heather Dill and Jennifer Simpson; a brother; and six grandchildren.
