= John Templeton Foundation =

American philanthropic organization

- Formation: 1987; 39 years ago
- Founder: John Templeton
- Headquarters: 300 Conshohocken State Road, Suite 500; West Conshohocken, Pennsylvania 19428 U.S.
- Fields: Scientific research; Religious studies
- Official language: English
- President: Timothy Dalrymple
- Revenue: $259 million (2024)
- Expenses: $170 million (2024)
- Endowment: $3.6 billion
- Website: templeton.org

The John Templeton Foundation (Templeton Foundation) is a philanthropic organization founded by John Templeton in 1987. Templeton became wealthy as a contrarian investor, and wanted to support progress in religious and spiritual knowledge, especially at the intersection of religion and science. He also sought to fund research on methods to promote and develop moral character, intelligence, and creativity in people, and to promote free markets. In 2008, the foundation was awarded the National Humanities Medal. In 2016, Inside Philanthropy called it "the oddest—or most interesting—big foundation around."

Templeton was chairman until he died in 2008. Templeton's son, John Templeton Jr., was its president from its founding until his own death in 2015, at which point Templeton Jr.'s daughter, Heather Templeton Dill, became president. The foundation administers the annual Templeton Prize for achievements in the field of spirituality, including those at the intersection of science and religion. It has an extensive grant-funding program (around $150 million per year as of 2016) aimed at supporting research in physics, biology, psychology, and the social sciences as well as philosophy and theology. It also supports programs related to genetics, "exceptional cognitive talent and genius" and "individual freedom and free markets". The foundation receives both praise and criticism for its awards, regarding the breadth of its coverage, and ideological perspectives asserted to be associated with them.

== Leadership ==
John Templeton (29 November 1912 – 8 July 2008) was an American-born British investor, banker, fund manager, and philanthropist. In 1954, he entered the mutual fund market and created the Templeton Growth Fund.

John Templeton Jr. was president of the foundation from its inception in 1987. He worked as a pediatric surgeon, and he was chief of pediatric surgery at Children's Hospital of Philadelphia in 1995, when he stopped practicing medicine to join the foundation. He took over as chairman when his father died. He was an evangelical Christian and supported various American conservative causes. He always maintained that he tried to run the foundation according to his father's wishes instead of his own. He died in 2015.

Heather Templeton Dill, the daughter of John Templeton Jr., became president in 2015 and was succeeded by Timothy Dalrymple in July 2025.

== Endowment ==
Templeton bequeathed around $500 million to the foundation when he died in 2008. As of 2015 the foundation's total endowment had grown to $3.34 billion. The foundation reports that it has issued over 3,300 grants, with over 2,800 of those going to recipients in North America. In 2016, the foundation disbursed over $151,000,000 in grants.

== Prizes ==
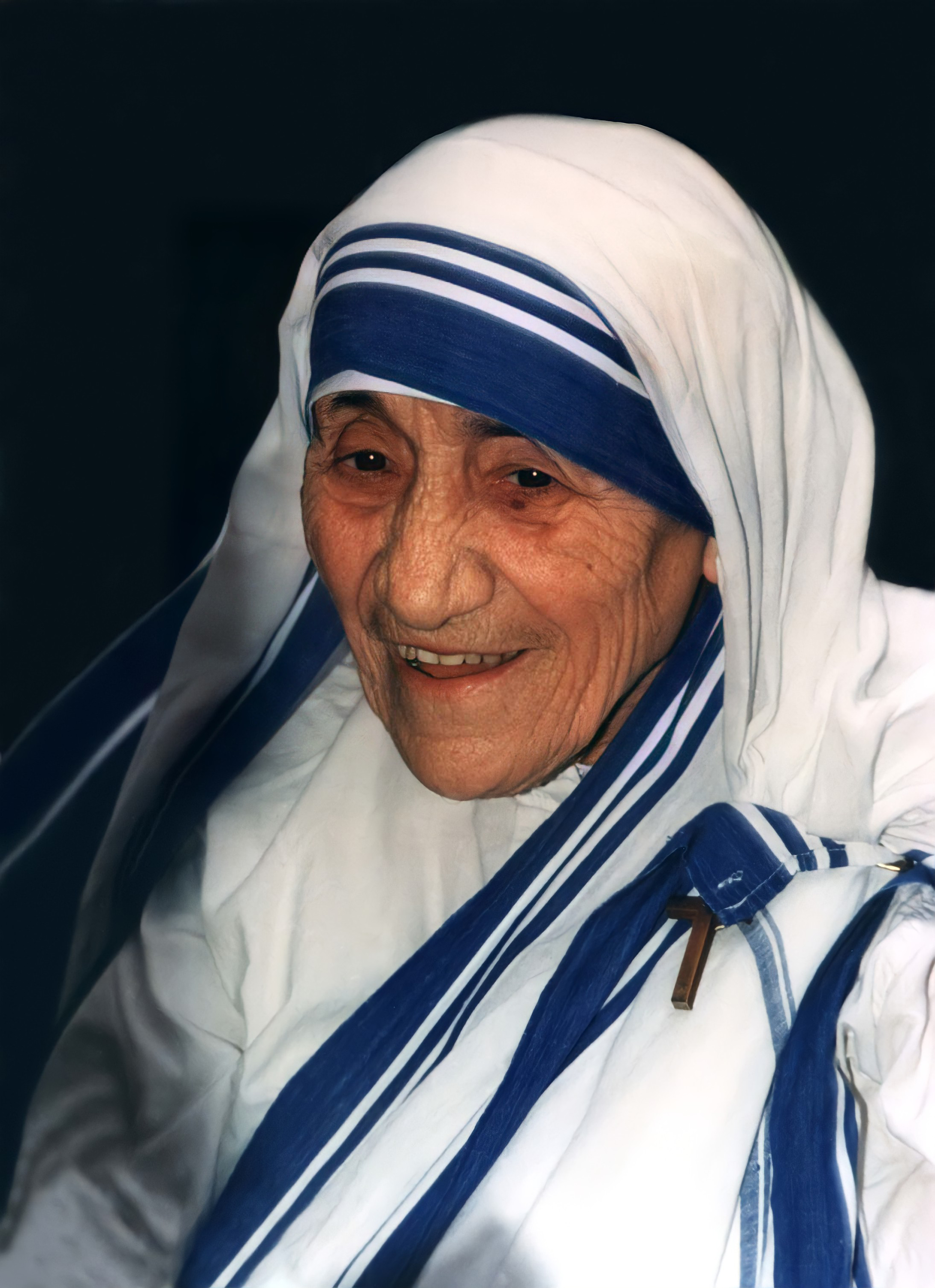
Mother Teresa received the inaugural Templeton Prize in 1973.

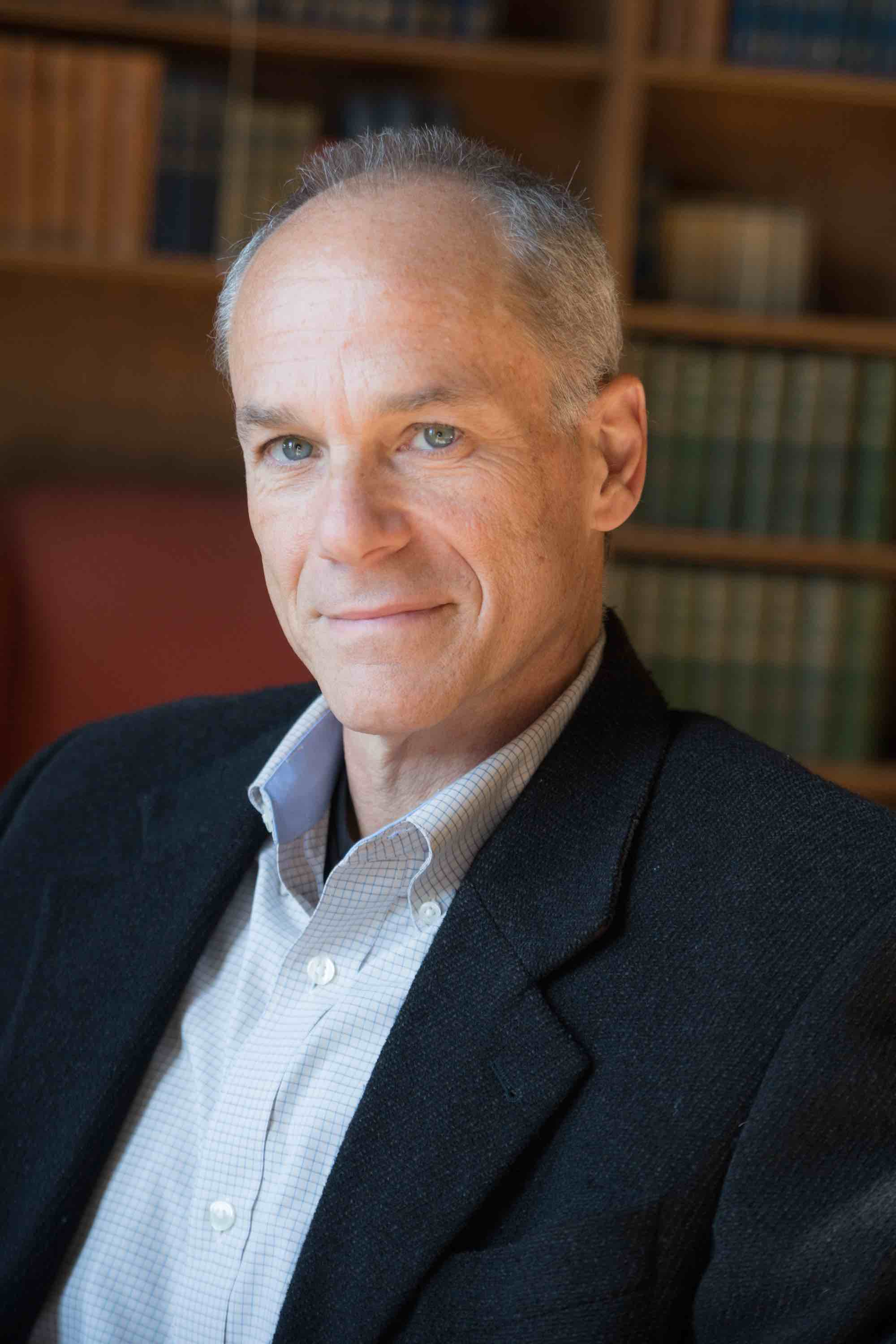
Marcelo Gleiser won the Templeton Prize in 2019.

The Templeton Prize was established by John Templeton, and he administered the prize until the foundation was established in 1987, which took it over. The prize has "a value of about $1.7 million, making it one of the world’s largest annual awards given to an individual".

The early prizes were given solely to people who had made great achievements in the field of religion; Mother Teresa received the inaugural award in 1973, with other early winners including Sir Sarvepalli Radhakrishnan (1975), Chiara Lubich (1977), and Nikkyō Niwano (1979). In the 1980s, John Templeton began considering the intersection of science and religion, and after he appointed two scientists to the judging panel, scientists who worked at this intersection began receiving it; Alister Hardy was the first, in 1987. More recent winners of the Templeton Prize have included the Dalai Lama in 2012, King Abdullah II of Jordan in 2018, Brazilian Jewish physicist and astronomer Marcelo Gleiser in 2019, and primatologist Jane Goodall in 2021.The 2025 winner is the Ecumenical Patriarch Bartholomew of Constantinople.

== Grants ==
Templeton "was a great believer in progress, learning, initiative and the power of human imagination—not to mention the free-enterprise system". While most of its funding goes to topics in science, philosophy, and religion, around 40 percent of its annual grants go to character development, genius, freedom, free enterprise, and fields associated with classical liberalism. Grants are given to people across all religions since Templeton believed progress in the field of spirituality could come from anywhere. The field of grants was broadened in the 1980s to include scientific fields like neuroscience, psychology, and cosmology, seen as being aligned with the mission.

Some research programs supported by the foundation have included the development of positive psychology by Martin Seligman, Angela Duckworth and others; the Black Hole Initiative at Harvard University; the Gen2Gen Encore Prize; the World Science Festival; Pew religious demographics surveys; and programs that engage with Buddhist, Jewish, Muslim, Hindu, Orthodox, Catholic, and Protestant traditions, including support for dialogue with scientists in synagogues, and a grant for advancing scientific literacy in madrasas.

As of 2015, the foundation awarded nearly a billion dollars in grants and charitable contributions and was the 55th largest grantor among American foundations.

The top ten largest grants as of 2018 were:

Project	Applicants	Institution	Amount
Science for Seminaries: Phase II	Jennifer Wiseman, Se Kim	American Association for the Advancement of Science	$6,182,109
Character Lab Research Network: Revolutionizing Research on Character Development	Angela Duckworth, Sean Talamas	The Character Lab	$3,717,258
Doing Development Differently	Matt Warner, Brad Lips	Atlas Economic Research Foundation	$3,095,213
Freedom Forum Global Expansion	Thor Halvorssen, Alex Gladstein	Human Rights Foundation	$3,074,788
Small-Scale Fundamental Physics Block Grant	Gerald Gabrielse	Northwestern University	$3,000,000
Epigenetic Diagnostics for Preventative Medicine	Michael Skinner	Washington State University	$2,936,242
Exploring the Informational Transitions Bridging Simple Chemistry and Minimal Life	Sarah Walker, Paul Davies	Arizona State University Foundation for a New American University	$2,904,374
Spiritual Exemplars: A Global Project on Engaged Spirituality	Donald Miller, Megan Sweas	University of Southern California	$2,783,594
Reasoning in moral thought and action	Liane Young, Fiery Cushman	Boston College Trustees	$2,743,961
Character Strength Interventions in Adolescents: Engaging Scholars and Practitioners to Promote Virtue Development	Sarah Schnitker, Benjamin Houltberg	Fuller Theological Seminary	$2,616,085

The ten largest grants from 2012 through 2017
Project	Applicants	Institution	Year	Amount
Putting the Extended Evolutionary Synthesis to the Test	Kevin Laland, Tobias Uller	University of St Andrews	2016	$7,480,634
Gratitude Britain	James Arthur	University of Birmingham	2012	$8,514,979
Landmark Spirituality and Health Survey	Neal Krause	University of Michigan	2013	$8,028,154
Service Britain	James Arthur	University of Birmingham	2015	$7,940,543
The Black Hole Initiative: Towards a Center for Interdisciplinary Research	Sheperd Doeleman, Abraham Loeb	Harvard University	2016	$7,204,252
Nautilus Media	John Steele	Nautilus Ventures, LLC	2012	$7,127,212
Intellectual Humility in Public Discourse	Michael Lynch, Brendan Kane	University of Connecticut	2016	$6,054,682
Transformative Britain	James Arthur	University of Birmingham	2017	$5,747,960
Advancing the Science of Imagination: Toward an "Imagination Quotient"	Martin Seligman, Scott Barry Kaufman	Imagination Institute	2014	$5,647,094
New Frontiers in Astronomy and Cosmology	Don York	The University of Chicago	2012	$5,559,107

The ten largest grants up to 2011
Project	Amount
Foundational Questions in Evolutionary Biology	$10,500,000
Foundational Questions in Physics and Cosmology	$8,812,078
The SEVEN Fund: Enterprise Based Solutions to Poverty	$8,742,911
Establishing an Institute for Research on Unlimited Love	$8,210,000
The Purpose Prize for Social Innovators Over the Age of 60	$8,148,322
Templeton–Cambridge Journalism Fellowships and Seminars in Science and Religion	$6,187,971
Accelerating Progress at the Interface of Positive Psychology and Neuroscience	$5,816,793
AAAS Dialogue on Science, Ethics, and Religion	$5,351,707
Promoting a Culture of Generosity, Part I: Feature Film	$5,000,000
Promoting a Culture of Generosity, Part II: The Philanthropy Channel	$5,000,000

=== Physics ===
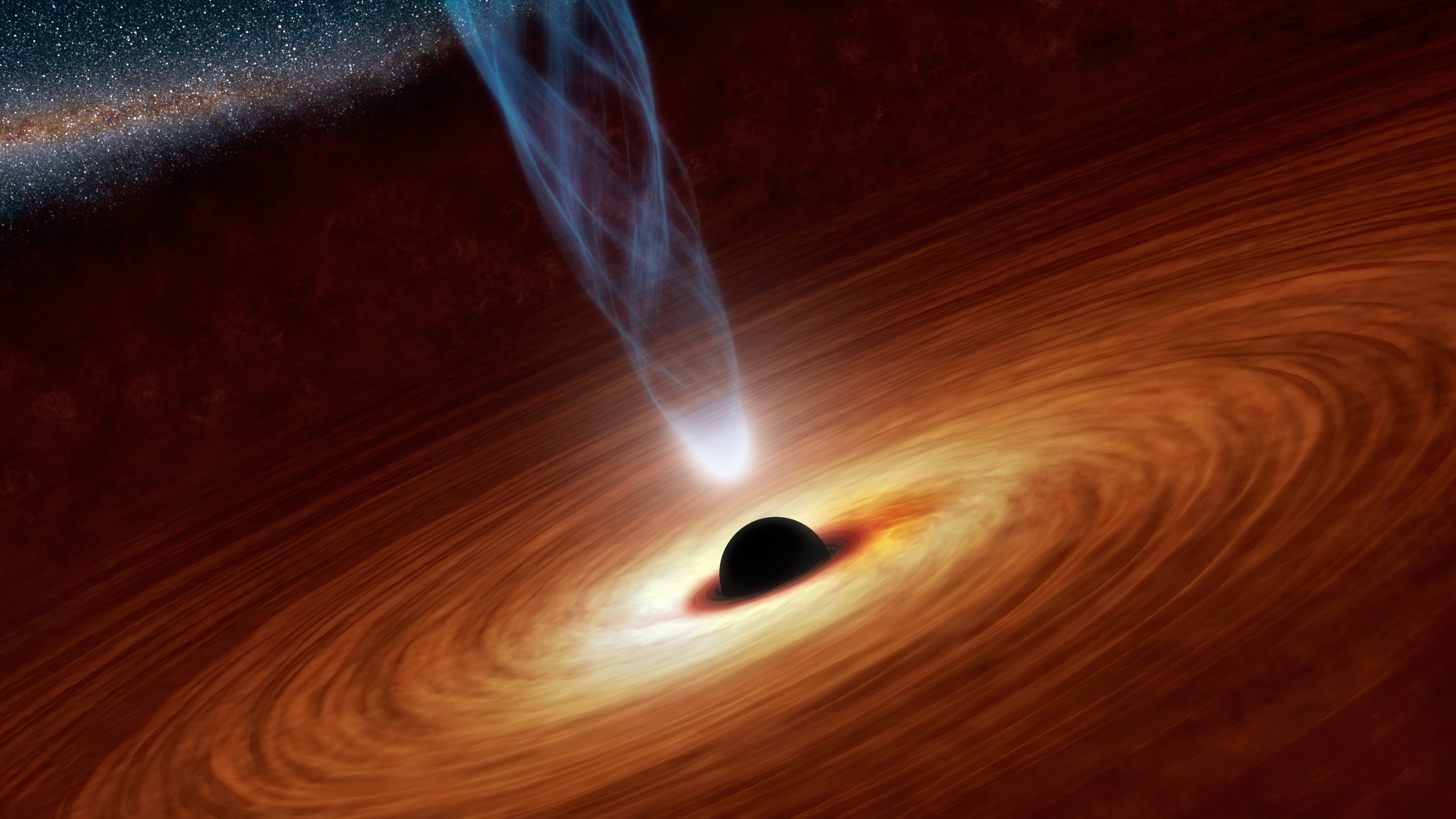
The Black Hole Initiative at Harvard University received a Templeton Foundation grant of over seven million dollars in 2016.

==== QISS (Quantum Information Structure of Spacetime) ====
The John Templeton Foundation granted over two million dollars in 2019, and then 4.5 million dollars in 2022 to QISS. The QISS consortium brings together specialists from quantum gravity, quantum information, foundations of quantum mechanics, as well Philosophy of Science. According to the organization, "QISS aims to found the physics of quantum spacetime on an information theoretical basis, bring within reach empirical access to quantum gravity phenomenology leveraging rapidly advancing quantum technologies, and promote interactions between physicists and philosophers. The broader scope of the consortium is to establish a long-term research program that brings together the represented communities." Marios Christodoulou and Carlo Rovelli are the project leaders.

==== Black Hole Initiative ====
In 2016, the foundation granted over seven million dollars to the Black Hole Initiative (BHI), an interdisciplinary program at Harvard University that includes the fields of Astronomy, Physics and Philosophy, and is said to be the first center in the world to focus on the study of black holes. Notable principal participants include Sheperd Doeleman, Peter Galison, Avi Loeb, Ramesh Narayan, Andrew Strominger, and Shing-Tung Yau. The BHI Inauguration was held on 18 April 2016 and was attended by Stephen Hawking; related workshop events were held on 19 April 2016.

==== Complexity at the Santa Fe Institute ====
In 2015, the Santa Fe Institute was awarded a three-year, $2.5 million grant to support the development of a general theory of complexity, constituting "a concise, parsimonious, and potentially mathematizable framework for understanding complex adaptive systems".

=== Biology and human development ===
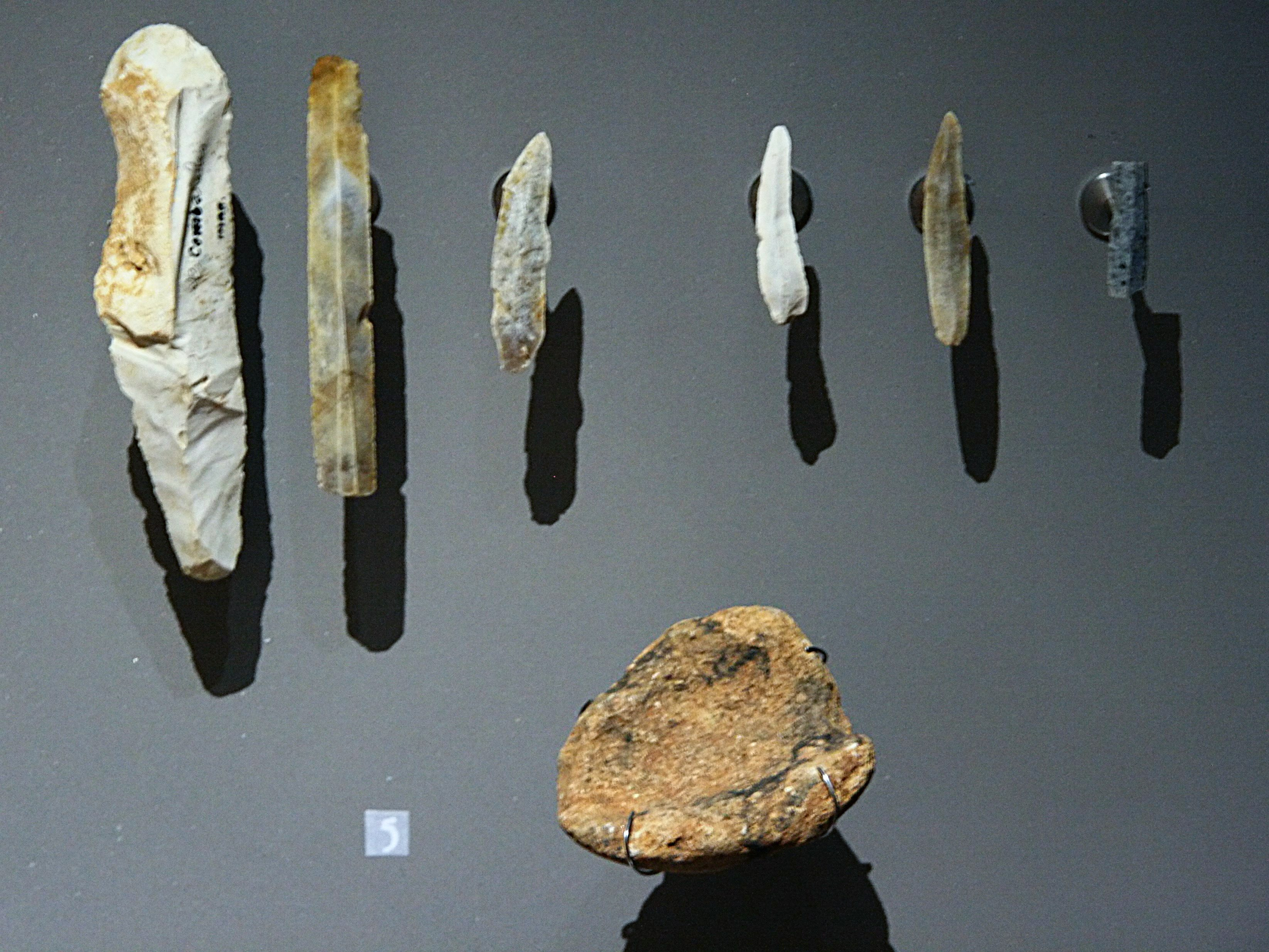
A grant of over three million dollars to the Stone Age Institute supports the study of what factors led human ancestors to things such as toolmaking.

A 2019 grant supports the study of the distribution of the Indo-European languages.

In 2016, the foundation awarded $5.4 million to the Foundation for Applied Molecular Evolution (FfAME) to study the origin of life on Earth, particularly investigating questions of how early RNA interacted with water, which is necessary for life but also degrades RNA, and how the introduction of energy to organic materials yielded life rather than turning it into tar. The project is headed by molecular biophysicist and chemist Steven A. Benner. The foundation also awarded an $8 million grant to a program examining a theory in evolutionary biology called extended evolutionary synthesis. This project is headed by evolutionary biologist Kevin Laland.

Several grants specifically supported inquiry into various aspects of human evolution. A 2014 grant of $4.9 million supports an effort at Arizona State University by paleoanthropologist Donald Johanson to explore how we became human, and a $3.2 million grant to Indiana University and the Stone Age Institute supports the study of "what factors led human ancestors to develop skills like making tools, developing language, and seeking out information".

In March 2019, the foundation provided the bulk of a group of grants adding up to over $7 million to enable the Institute for Interdisciplinary Brain and Behavioral Science (The Brain Institute) at Chapman University to examine "how the human brain enables conscious control of decisions and actions".

A grant from the foundation supports a study of religion and health conducted by Tyler VanderWeele of Harvard University. VanderWeele is the John L. Loeb and Frances Lehman Loeb Professor of Epidemiology in the Departments of Epidemiology and Biostatistics at the Harvard T.H. Chan School of Public Health, and co-director the University's Initiative on Health, Religion and Spirituality. His research has focused on the application of causal inference to epidemiology, as well as on the relationship between religion and health.

In June 2019, the foundation awarded one of its largest grants to the Blavatnik Institute at Harvard Medical School for its Ancient DNA Atlas project that seeks to sequence the DNA of ancient human remains to tell the story of human migration and development through the addition of DNA sequences of 10,000 individuals spanning 50,000 years. The funding was used to solve a riddle that had puzzled historians, classicists, linguists, anthropologists and archaeologists for 200 years - whether the bulk of the European civilization had arrived from Anatolia or the Pontic Steppes of Central Asia, and how Indo-European languages spread over an enormous geographical area from Britain to India, becoming the largest linguistic group today.

The funding was used to embrace a multi-disciplinary approach and crowd-sourced results before the final manuscripts were completed, receiving commentary and feedback from academics of various institutions on several continents, according to geneticist David Reich, lead researcher on the project. The study was also funded by the governments of the US, Russia, Germany (Max Planck Institute), European Union and India. Results have been published in Science and Cell.

=== Social sciences ===
==== Pew Research Center ====
The Pew Research Center, an American fact tank or research organization, has been "jointly and generously funded" by The Pew Charitable Trusts and the foundation for its studies focusing on demographics of religions in the world, part of the series entitled Pew-Templeton Global Religious Futures.

==== Center on Religion and Chinese Society ====
The Center on Religion and Chinese Society of the Purdue University in Indiana is funded by the foundation. The current director of the center, the Chinese American Christian scholar Fenggang Yang, has been granted more than $9.5 million to support his projects, The center has published research on religion in China, especially based on Yang's own theory of the so-called "religious market", with speculations were based on a report of the Pew Research Center, another publication backed by the foundation. Some scholars of Chinese religion have criticized Yang's sociological theories about religion in China, although the New York Times has referred to Yang as "a pioneer in the study of the sociology of religion in China", and the Wall Street Journal has deemed him a "leading scholar on Chinese church-society relation".

=== Psychology ===
==== Positive psychology, religion and medicine ====
Harold G. Koenig, Dale Mathews, David Larson, Jeffrey Levin, Herbert Benson and Michael McCullough are scholars to whom the foundation has provided funds to "report the positive relations" between religion and medicine. One field in which the foundation has been particularly supportive is positive psychology, as developed by Martin Seligman, Angela Duckworth and others. Positive psychology is "the scientific study of what makes life most worth living", or "the scientific study of positive human functioning and flourishing on multiple levels that include the biological, personal, relational, institutional, cultural, and global dimensions of life". Positive psychology is concerned with eudaimonia, "the good life", reflection about what holds the greatest value in life – the factors that contribute the most to a well-lived and fulfilling life. Positive psychology began as a new domain of psychology in 1998 when Seligman chose it as the theme for his term as president of the American Psychological Association.

==== Scientific development of virtue interventions ====
In 2019, the foundation awarded $2.6 million grant to Sarah Schnitker of Baylor University and Benjamin Houltberg of the University of Southern California to "galvanize widespread scientific development of virtue interventions for adolescents across a diversity of contexts".

A grant from the foundation supports a study of religion and health conducted by Tyler VanderWeele of Harvard University. VanderWeele is the John L. Loeb and Frances Lehman Loeb Professor of Epidemiology in the Departments of Epidemiology and Biostatistics at the Harvard T.H. Chan School of Public Health, and co-director the University's Initiative on Health, Religion and Spirituality. His research has focused on the application of causal inference to epidemiology, as well as on the relationship between religion and health.

=== Science education ===
The foundation has provided grants in support of dialogue with scientists in synagogues, and a grant for advancing scientific literacy in madrasas. It has also sponsored a major, multi-year, multi-million-dollar effort to integrate science education in North American seminaries, including Mainline Protestant, Evangelical Protestant, and Catholic and Orthodox institutions.

=== History ===
The foundation provided funding for the book Galileo Goes to Jail and Other Myths about Science and Religion, which was edited by historian of science Ronald Numbers.

== Reception ==
The foundation has received both praise and criticism for its awards. The French National Center for Scientific Research (CNRS) has been critical of the foundation for funding "initiatives to bring science and religion closer together." Science journalist Chris Mooney, an atheist, received a 2010 Templeton-Cambridge Journalism Fellowship. In a 2010 article on his Discover magazine blog, Mooney wrote, "I can honestly say that I have found the lectures and presentations that we've heard here to be serious and stimulating. The same goes for the discussions that have followed them".

Some scholars have expressed concerns about the nature of the awards, research projects, and publications backed by the foundation. These concerns include questioning its integrity, cronyism, and its Templeton Freedom Awards. Journalist Sunny Bains pointed out in 2011 that Templeton Freedom Awards are administered by the Atlas Economic Research Foundation, a group that opposes taking action on climate change and defends the tobacco industry, which also gives the foundation funding. Drexel University sociologist Robert Brulle listed the foundation as among the largest financial contributors to the climate change denial movement between 2003 and 2010.

=== Religious funding ===
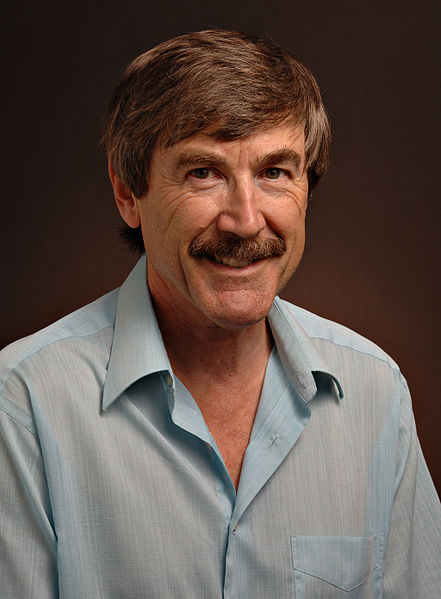
Paul Davies, physicist and 1995 Templeton Prize laureate, has defended the foundation's role in the scientific community.

Critics have asserted that the foundation has supported Christian-oriented research in the field of the scientific study of religions. Wired magazine noted in 1999 that "the scientific-review and grant-award process at the Templeton Foundation is run by Charles Harper, an Oxford-trained planetary scientist specializing in star and planet formation who has a degree in theology. Harper himself is an Evangelical Christian; the scientists who apply to the foundation for support, though, are not required to state their religious beliefs, or to have any." In 2006, John Horgan, a 2005 Templeton-Cambridge fellow then working as a freelance science journalist, wrote in The Chronicle of Higher Education that he had enjoyed his fellowship, but felt guilty that by taking money from the foundation, he had contributed to the mingling of science with religion. Horgan stated "misgivings about the foundation's agenda of reconciling religion and science". He said that a conference he attended favored scientists who "offered a perspective clearly skewed in favor of religion and Christianity." Horgan fears recipients of large grants from the foundation sometimes write what the foundation wants rather than what they believe. Richard Dawkins, in his 2006 book The God Delusion, interprets Horgan as saying that "Templeton's money corrupts science", and characterizes the prize as going "usually to a scientist who is prepared to say something nice about religion". Donald Wiebe, a scholar of religious studies at the University of Toronto, similarly criticized the foundation in a 2009 article entitled Religious Biases in Funding Religious Studies Research?. According to him, the foundation supports Christian bias in the field of religious studies, by deliberately imposing constraints to steer the results of the research.

Paul Davies, physicist and 1995 Templeton Prize laureate, gave a defense of the foundation's role in the scientific community in the Times Higher Education Supplement in March 2005. In 2010, journalist Nathan Schneider opined that "at worst, Templeton could be called heterodox and naïve". In 2011, the science journal Nature took note of the ongoing controversy among scientists over working with Templeton. Jerry Coyne, University of Chicago evolutionary biologist, told Nature writer Mitchell Waldrop that the foundation's purpose is to eliminate the wall between religion and science, and to use science's prestige to validate religion. Other scientists, including Foundation grantees like University of Chicago psychologist John Cacioppo and Anthony Aguirre, a University of California—Santa Cruz astrophysicist, told Nature that they have never felt pressured by Templeton to spin their research toward religion-friendly conclusions.

=== Intelligent design ===
A 2007 article in the Los Angeles Times described the foundation as having "drawn criticism for its early support of intelligent design". Charles L. Harper Jr., a former senior vice president of the foundation, told BusinessWeek in 2005 that the foundation had become one of the "principal critics" of the intelligent design movement and funded projects that challenged that movement. Harper Jr. told The New York Times the same year: "From the point of view of rigor and intellectual seriousness, the intelligent design people don't come out very well in our world of scientific review".

Some organizations funded by the foundation in the 1990s gave book-writing grants to Guillermo Gonzalez and to William Dembski, proponents of intelligent design who later joined the Discovery Institute. The foundation also gave money directly to the Discovery Institute which in turn passed it through to Baylor University, which used the funds to support Dembski's salary at its short-lived Michael Polanyi Center. The foundation funded projects by Bruce L. Gordon, associate director of the center, after the center was dissolved. Some media outlets described the foundation as a supporter of intelligent design during the Kitzmiller v. Dover Area School District litigation in the mid-2000s, a charge which the foundation denied. The foundation "explicitly warns intelligent-design researchers not to bother submitting proposals: they will not be considered."

In March 2009, the Discovery Institute accused the foundation of blocking its involvement in Biological Evolution: Facts and Theories, a Vatican-backed, Templeton-funded conference in Rome. On the lack of involvement of any speakers supporting intelligent design, the conference director Rev. Marc Leclerc said, "We think that it's not a scientific perspective, nor a theological or philosophical one ... This makes a dialogue difficult, maybe impossible". In 2011, The Times stated that the Templeton Prize is "explicitly critical of such pseudoscientific gibberish as intelligent design".

=== Conservatism ===
A number of journalists have highlighted connections with conservative causes. A 1997 article in Slate written by David Plotz said the foundation had given a significant amount of financial support to groups, causes and individuals considered conservative, including gifts to Gertrude Himmelfarb, Milton Friedman, Walter E. Williams, Julian Lincoln Simon and Mary Lefkowitz, and called John Templeton Jr. a "sugar daddy" for such thinkers. The foundation also has a history of supporting the Cato Institute, a libertarian think-tank and The Heritage Foundation conservative think-tank, as well as projects at major research centers and universities such as Hernando de Soto's Instituto Libertad Y Democracia and the X Prize Foundation, which is described as "a nonprofit organization that designs and manages public competitions intended to encourage technological development that could benefit humanity".

In a 2007 article in The Nation Barbara Ehrenreich drew attention to the foundation's former president John M. Templeton Jr. funding of the conservative group Freedom's Watch, and referred to the foundation as a "right-wing venture". Pamela Thompson, former Vice President of Communications of the foundation, replied that "the Foundation is, and always has been, run in accordance with the wishes of Sir John Templeton Sr, who laid very strict criteria for its mission and approach", that it is "a non-political entity with no religious bias" and it "is totally independent of any other organisation and therefore neither endorses, nor contributes to political candidates, campaigns, or movements of any kind".

== Templeton Press ==
The foundation also funds an affiliated publisher, Templeton Press, which from 2004 to 2010 published the periodical In Character: A Journal of Everyday Virtues. From 2000 to 2003 it published Research news & opportunities in science and theology, in which Bruce L. Gordon published a piece on the state of "design theory" in the aftermath of the Michael Polanyi Center affair. Templeton Press has a partnership with the Yale University Press, producing books on character and Foundational Questions in Science.

=== Science & Theology News ===
Science & Theology News was a monthly international newspaper of the Templeton Foundation that focused on science and religion and dialogue between them, specifically the point of view that both are worthwhile and compatible endeavors. Harold G. Koenig was the publisher and Karl Giberson the editor-in-chief. The newspaper ceased publication in Fall of 2006 after more than 60 issues.
