= Michael Polanyi Center =

- The Center's logo
- Formation: 1999
- Dissolved: 2000
- Type: Religious research for Baylor University
- Legal status: Merged with Baylor Institute for Faith and Learning
- Headquarters: Waco, Texas, United States
- Last Director: Bruce L. Gordon
- Website: baylor.edu/~polanyi/ (Archived)

The Michael Polanyi Center (MPC) was a research center at Baylor University dedicated to the study of intelligent design. It was the first center at a research university exclusively dedicated to intelligent design study and mainly hosted William Dembski, its director, and Bruce L. Gordon, its assistant director. It was founded in 1999 by Baylor president Robert B. Sloan "with the primary aim of advancing the understanding of the sciences" in a religious context and was named for Michael Polanyi.

The center was aligned with the Discovery Institute's wedge strategy, and was funded in part by a grant from the John Templeton Foundation via the Discovery Institute. All of the center's research investigated the subject of intelligent design. It hosted a conference in April 2000 that brought the center to the attention of the broader Baylor community as well as the rest of the scholarly world.

Shortly thereafter Baylor's faculty called for the center to be dissolved. Baylor president Robert B. Sloan rejected the faculty demand, and the confrontation was resolved by agreeing to appoint a committee of people from outside the university. The committee recommended that the center be renamed and placed under the supervision of the existing Baylor Institute for Faith and Learning. Dembski objected and was removed as director in October 2000, and was appointed an associate research professor in the institute, a position he held until he left Baylor in 2005. Gordon was named interim director and the center was renamed the Baylor Science and Religion Project and placed under the supervision of the institute. By 2002, it had been again renamed to the Baylor Center for Science, Philosophy and Religion. By 2003, the MPC itself had been formally dissolved. Gordon left Baylor in 2005 to join the Discovery Institute.

== History ==
=== Background ===
Baylor University was founded in 1845 by the Republic of Texas (before Texas Statehood) in Waco, Texas as a Baptist University.

A new Baylor president, Robert B. Sloan was appointed in 1995. Sloan, a New Testament Scholar with a doctorate in theology from the University of Basel, proposed to return the school to its mission of integrating academic excellence and Christian commitment. As a result, the Baylor Institute for Faith and Learning (IFL) was established in 1997.

Sloan noted:

Baylor ought to be the kind of place where a student can ask a question and not just get the runaround. He shouldn't have to go to the theology department and be told, "Oh, that's a scientific question. Don't ask me that." And then the student goes to the science department and they tell him, "That's a religious question. Don't ask me that."

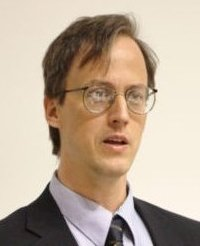
William A. Dembski was the center's first director

In 1998 Sloan read an article by mathematician, philosopher and intelligent design advocate William Dembski and was impressed. Sloan invited Dembski to the IFL, whose director Michael Beaty was also impressed by his work and credentials. They learned of Dembski's wish to establish an intelligent design research center at a major US university, which was part of the intelligent design wedge strategy.

As a result, in October 1999, Baylor's Michael Polanyi Center was quietly established separately from the IFL and without oversight from any existing academic structures. Dembski's salary was funded by a grant from the John Templeton Foundation via the Discovery Institute. Dembski named it after the Hungarian scientist and philosopher of science Michael Polanyi (1891–1976). Dembski appointed Bruce L. Gordon as his deputy. Gordon was also appointed as a non-tenured associate research professor in the institute.

The MPC website stated:

The Michael Polanyi Center (MPC) is a cross-disciplinary research and educational initiative focused on advancing the understanding of science. It has a fourfold purpose: (1) to support and pursue research in the history and conceptual foundations of the natural and social sciences; (2) to study the impact of contemporary science on the humanities and the arts; (3) to be an active participant in the growing dialogue between science and religion; and (4) to pursue the mathematical development and empirical application of design-theoretic concepts in the natural sciences.

=== "The Nature of Nature" ===
Between April 12 and April 15, 2000, the Center held a conference entitled "The Nature of Nature," jointly sponsored by the Discovery Institute and the John Templeton Foundation. Critics of intelligent design within the scientific community were split as to whether to attend. They thought that the conference might give ID more academic credibility, something it lacks, and that it would be used for propaganda by the ID movement and the Christian press. Nevertheless, the conference attracted a variety of scientists, theologians and philosophers, including Alan Guth, John Searle, Christian de Duve, and Nobel Prize-winner Steven Weinberg.

The conference brought things to a head and, as a result, on April 18 the Faculty Senate voted 27–2 for the center to be abolished. This call was rejected by Sloan on April 20, who commented:

I believe there are matters of intellectual and academic integrity at stake here … We should not be afraid to ask questions, even if they are politically incorrect

A compromise was later reached to form an independent committee to review the center, consisting of eight faculty members from across the country to be chaired by the Professor of Philosophy William F. Cooper.

The committee met between September 8 and September 10. On October 17 the committee released its report. Although it recommended that there should be a place for the study of intelligent design, it recommended that the center be renamed and reconstituted within Baylor's Institute for Faith and Learning. This was seen as a compromise between the two sides and an attempt to defuse the row that had developed.

=== Aftermath ===
On October 18 Dembski responded to the report with a press release/email:

The report marks the triumph of intelligent design as a legitimate form of academic inquiry. This is a great day for academic freedom. I'm deeply grateful to President Sloan and Baylor University for making this possible, as well as to the peer review committee for its unqualified affirmation of my own work on intelligent design. The scope of the Center will be expanded to embrace a broader set of conceptual issues at the intersection of science and religion, and the Center will therefore receive a new name to reflect this expanded vision. My work on intelligent design will continue unabated. Dogmatic opponents of design who demanded the Center be shut down have met their Waterloo. Baylor University is to be commended for remaining strong in the face of intolerant assaults on freedom of thought and expression.

In reaction to Dembski's response, Baylor removed Dembski as director and he was made an untenured associate research professor in "conceptual foundations of science" in Baylor's Institute for Faith and Learning. He held that position until he left Baylor in May 2005.

Gordon was named interim director and by 2001 the center had been renamed The Baylor Science and Religion Project and placed under the institute. By 2002 it had been again renamed to the Baylor Center for Science, Philosophy and Religion, still with Gordon at its head. By 2003 the MPC had been formally dissolved. Gordon left Baylor in 2005 to join the Discovery Institute.
