= Sewanee, Tennessee =

- CDP
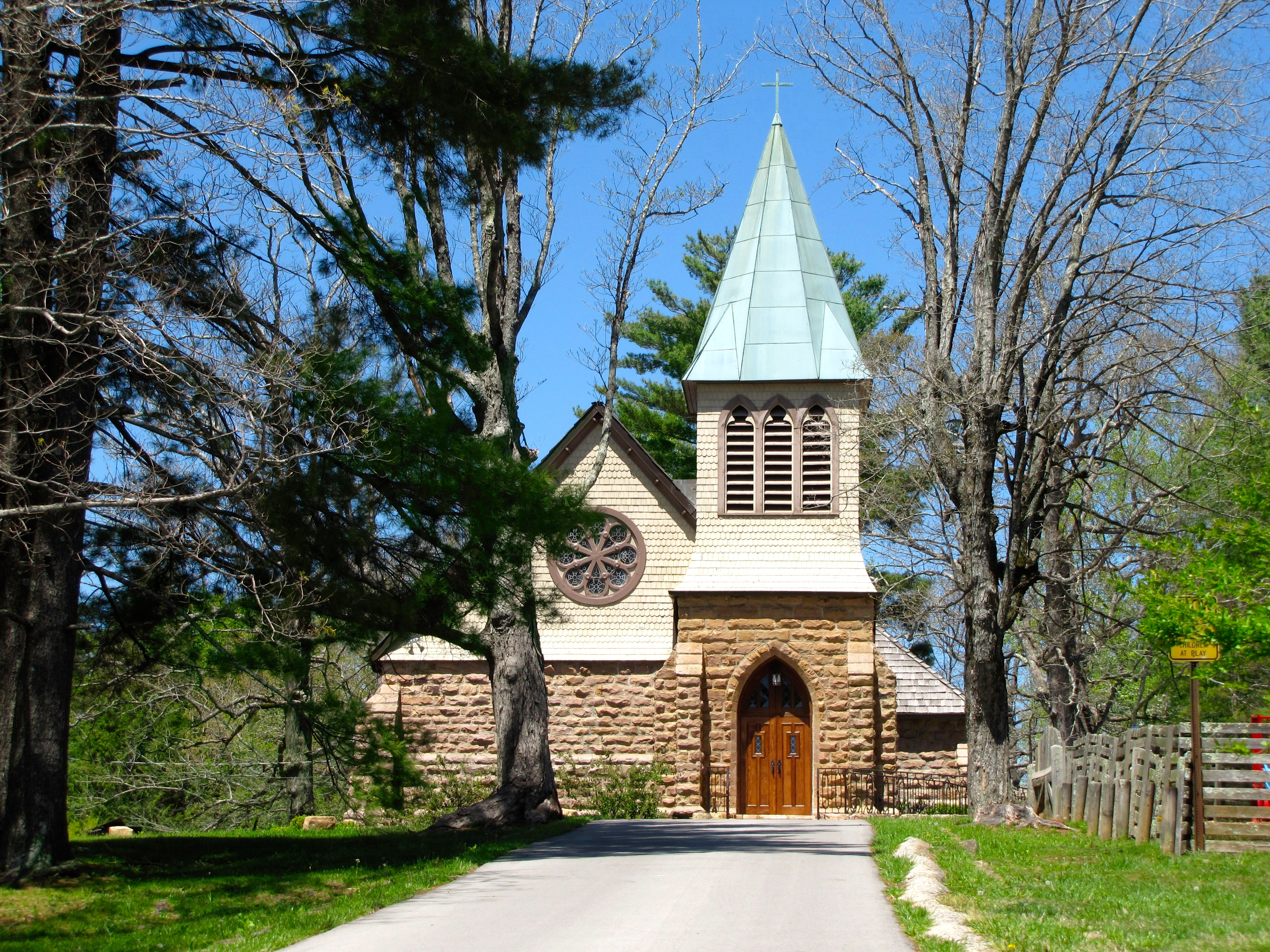
- Parish of St. Mark & St. Paul in Sewanee

- Location of Sewanee in Franklin County, Tennessee.

- Location within Tennessee Location within the United States
- Coordinates: 35°12′4″N 85°55′17″W
- Country: United States
- State: Tennessee
- County: Franklin

Area
  - Total: 3.90 sq mi (10.11 km^{2})
  - Land: 3.89 sq mi (10.07 km^{2})
  - Water: 0.019 sq mi (0.05 km^{2})
- Elevation: 1,929 ft (588 m)

Population (2020)
  - Total: 2,535
  - Density: 652.3/sq mi (251.85/km^{2})
- Time zone: UTC-6 (Central (CST))
  - Summer (DST): UTC-5 (CDT)
- ZIP codes: 37375, 37383
- Area code: 931
- FIPS code: 47-67140
- GNIS feature ID: 1301113

Sewanee (/səˈwɑːni/) is a census-designated place (CDP) in Franklin County, Tennessee, United States. The population was 2,535 at the 2020 census. It is part of the Winchester, Tennessee Micropolitan Statistical Area.

Sewanee is best known as the home of The University of the South, commonly known as "Sewanee".

== Geography ==
Sewanee lies on the western edge of the Cumberland Plateau in the southeastern part of Middle Tennessee. It is located at 35°12′4″N 85°55′17″W (35.201232, -85.921524). It is at an elevation of 1,929 feet (588 m).

The primary road in Sewanee is a merged section of U.S. Route 41A and Tennessee State Route 56, which connects the community with Monteagle to the east. In the western part of Sewanee, the two highways diverge, with US 41A descending the Plateau to the west and continuing toward Cowan and Winchester, and SR 56 descending the Plateau to the south and continuing toward Sherwood and Alabama.

The University of the South campus occupies most of the northern portion of Sewanee, with several small neighborhoods scattered around it. A small commercial district is concentrated around the intersection of US 41A and University Avenue, the latter being a wide road that connects the highway with the university campus.

According to the United States Census Bureau, the CDP has a total area of 3.9 square miles (10 km^{2}), of which 3.9 square miles (10 km^{2}) is land and 0.02 square miles (0.052 km^{2}) (0.49%) is water.

=== Climate ===
The climate is characterized by relatively high temperatures and evenly distributed precipitation throughout the year. The Köppen Climate Classification subtype for this climate is "Cfa" (Humid Subtropical Climate).

Climate data for Sewanee, Tennessee, 1991–2020 normals, extremes 1895–present
Month	Jan	Feb	Mar	Apr	May	Jun	Jul	Aug	Sep	Oct	Nov	Dec	Year
Record high °F (°C)	73 (23)	80 (27)	86 (30)	90 (32)	93 (34)	101 (38)	103 (39)	101 (38)	99 (37)	94 (34)	85 (29)	72 (22)	103 (39)
Mean maximum °F (°C)	63.8 (17.7)	66.9 (19.4)	74.2 (23.4)	80.3 (26.8)	83.9 (28.8)	89.0 (31.7)	90.3 (32.4)	90.4 (32.4)	87.6 (30.9)	80.9 (27.2)	72.8 (22.7)	65.0 (18.3)	92.6 (33.7)
Mean daily maximum °F (°C)	45.4 (7.4)	49.3 (9.6)	58.2 (14.6)	67.4 (19.7)	74.3 (23.5)	80.9 (27.2)	84.1 (28.9)	83.7 (28.7)	78.1 (25.6)	68.4 (20.2)	57.6 (14.2)	48.2 (9.0)	66.3 (19.0)
Daily mean °F (°C)	37.2 (2.9)	40.6 (4.8)	49.0 (9.4)	57.6 (14.2)	65.1 (18.4)	71.9 (22.2)	75.1 (23.9)	74.6 (23.7)	69.1 (20.6)	59.0 (15.0)	48.9 (9.4)	40.6 (4.8)	57.4 (14.1)
Mean daily minimum °F (°C)	29.0 (−1.7)	31.9 (−0.1)	39.8 (4.3)	47.8 (8.8)	55.8 (13.2)	62.9 (17.2)	66.2 (19.0)	65.5 (18.6)	60.0 (15.6)	49.6 (9.8)	40.2 (4.6)	33.0 (0.6)	48.5 (9.2)
Mean minimum °F (°C)	9.7 (−12.4)	14.2 (−9.9)	21.5 (−5.8)	31.7 (−0.2)	41.8 (5.4)	53.7 (12.1)	58.8 (14.9)	58.3 (14.6)	47.7 (8.7)	33.5 (0.8)	23.9 (−4.5)	16.1 (−8.8)	7.7 (−13.5)
Record low °F (°C)	−10 (−23)	−11 (−24)	3 (−16)	20 (−7)	30 (−1)	39 (4)	52 (11)	50 (10)	34 (1)	24 (−4)	3 (−16)	−6 (−21)	−11 (−24)
Average precipitation inches (mm)	5.50 (140)	5.20 (132)	5.38 (137)	6.41 (163)	4.91 (125)	5.80 (147)	5.59 (142)	4.72 (120)	5.09 (129)	4.21 (107)	4.86 (123)	6.37 (162)	64.04 (1,627)
Average precipitation days (≥ 0.01 in)	10.9	12.6	10.1	10.4	12.1	12.3	12.7	11.0	7.8	9.0	8.8	10.9	128.6
Source 1: NOAA
Source 2: National Weather Service

== Demographics ==
Historical population
Census	Pop.	Note	%±
2000	2,361		—
2010	2,311		−2.1%
2020	2,535		9.7%
U.S. Decennial Census

=== 2020 census ===
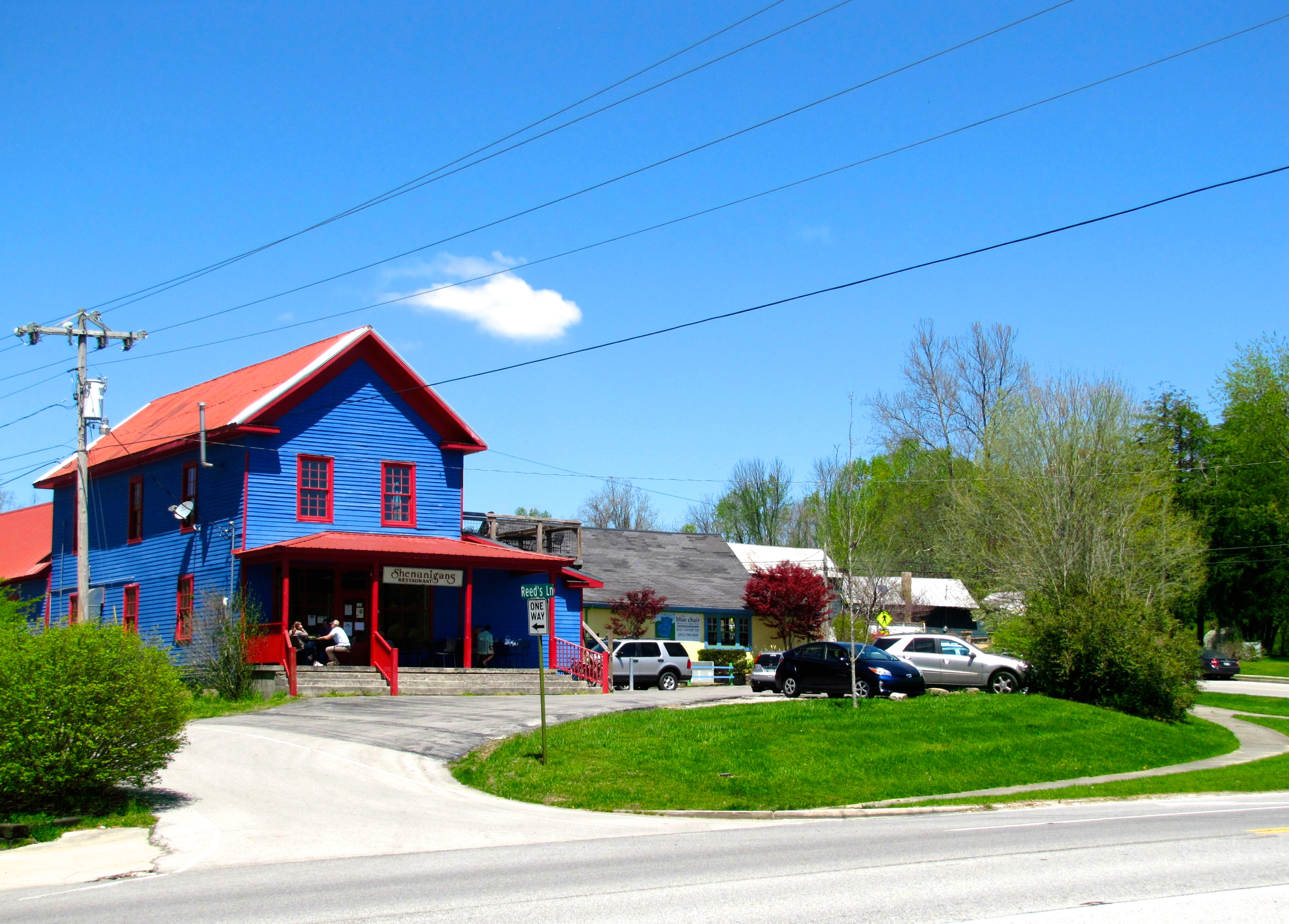
Businesses along US 41A in Sewanee

Sewanee racial composition
Race	Number	Percentage
White (non-Hispanic)	2,095	82.64%
Black or African American (non-Hispanic)	118	4.62%
Native American	2	0.08%
Asian	71	2.8%
Other/Mixed	162	6.39%
Hispanic or Latino	88	3.47%

As of the 2020 United States census, there were 2,535 people, 469 households, and 249 families residing in the CDP.

=== 2000 census ===
As of the census of 2000, there were 2,361 people, 494 households, and 302 families living in the CDP. The population density was 510.2 inhabitants per square mile (197.0/km^{2}). There were 554 housing units at an average density of 119.7 per square mile (46.2/km^{2}). The racial makeup of the CDP was 93.10% White, 5.42% African American, 0.04% Native American, 0.72% Asian, 0.04% Pacific Islander, 0.08% from other races, and 0.59% from two or more races. Hispanic or Latino of any race were 1.65% of the population.

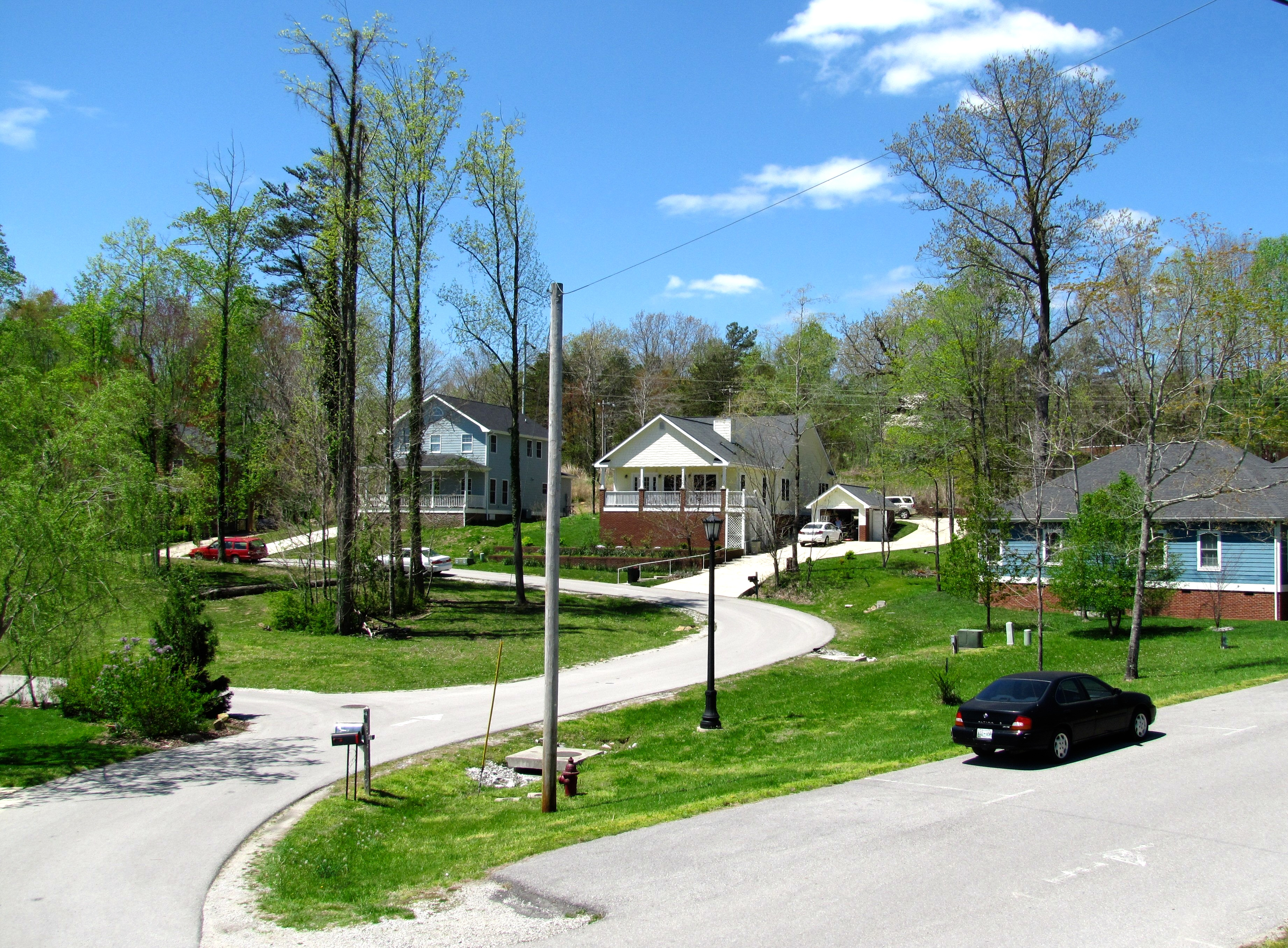
Houses in Sewanee

There were 494 households, out of which 24.9% had children under the age of 18 living with them, 52.8% were married couples living together, 7.3% had a female householder with no husband present, and 38.7% were non-families. 34.6% of all households were made up of individuals, and 13.8% had someone living alone who was 65 years of age or older. The average household size was 2.15 and the average family size was 2.76.

In the CDP, the population was spread out, with 9.5% under the age of 18, 56.9% from 18 to 24, 11.3% from 25 to 44, 12.1% from 45 to 64, and 10.2% who were 65 years of age or older. The median age was 21 years. For every 100 females, there were 84.7 males. For every 100 females age 18 and over, there were 84.5 males.

The median income for a household in the CDP was $55,625, and the median income for a family was $75,681. Males had a median income of $51,125 versus $41,518 for females. The per capita income for the CDP was $16,484. About 3.3% of families and 7.6% of the population were below the poverty line, including 5.2% of those under age 18 and 4.9% of those age 65 or over.

== Healthcare ==
Sewanee has one hospital, Southern Tennessee Regional Health Care - Sewanee (formerly known as Emerald-Hodgson Hospital).

== Education and culture ==
Sewanee is the home of The University of the South, founded and owned by the southern dioceses of the Episcopal Church, and generally known as "Sewanee".

Sewanee Elementary School serves Sewanee and nearby communities.

The university hosts the Sewanee Writers' Conference each summer. The Sewanee Summer Music Festival is an annual, month-long music camp for young orchestral musicians under the tutelage of accomplished teachers and conductors.

Nearby St. Andrew's-Sewanee School, one of the oldest boarding-day schools in the South, is a private school for grades 6 through 12 with a student population of 100 boarding and 150 day students.

The Sewanee Review, a literary magazine, has been published in Sewanee continuously since 1892.

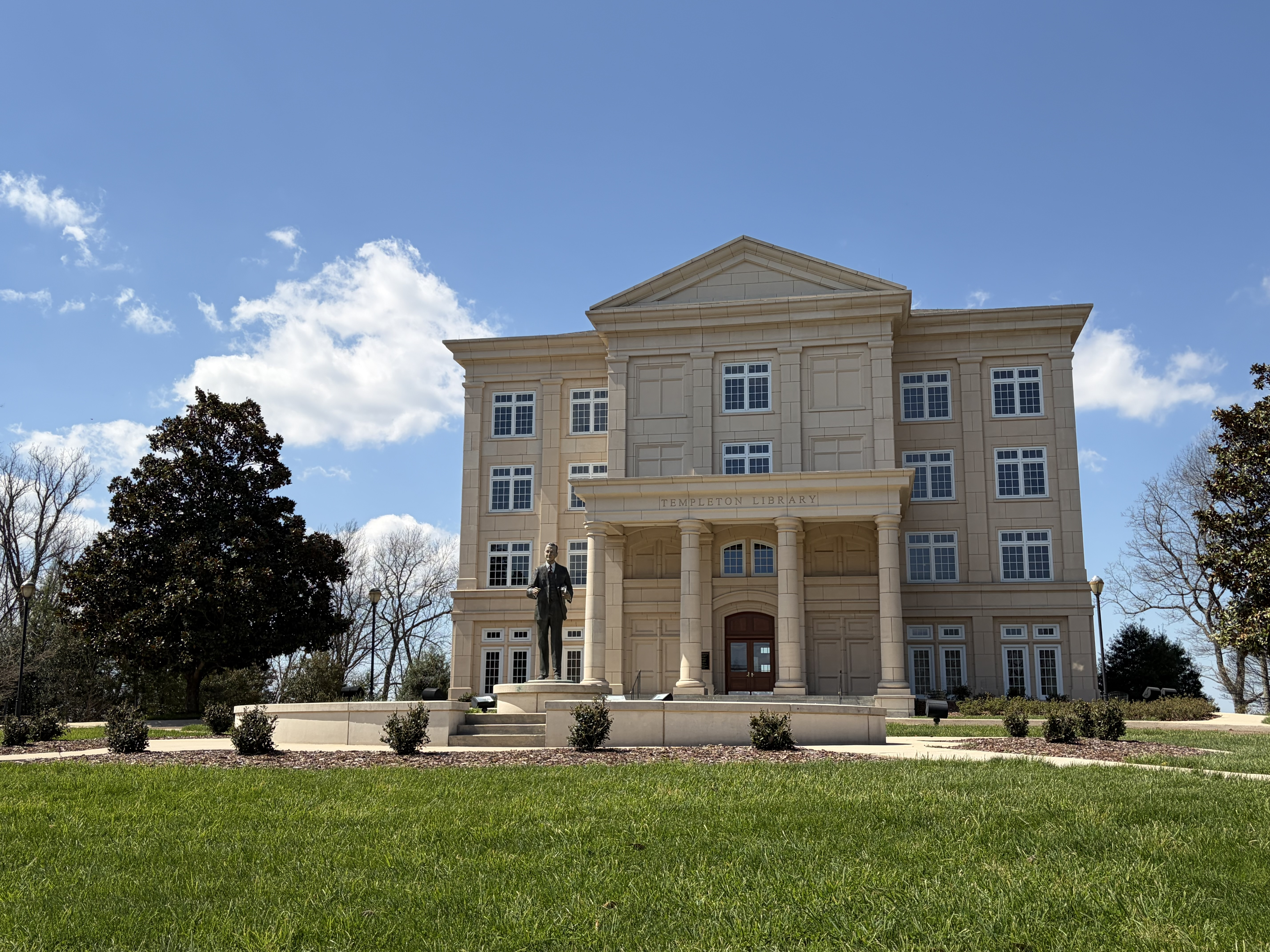
The Templeton Library, built by John Templeton

The Templeton Library, which was to be the repository of the papers of financier Sir John Templeton, a native of the area, sits prominently on a bluff of the plateau, overlooking the valley below. No longer a library, it now houses several private apartments.

== Notable people ==
● Jon Meacham, Presidential Historian and Pulitzer Prize Winning Author

- Bill Hawlow (born 1943), American freestyle and folkstyle wrestler, NCAA champion at Oklahoma State, silver medalist at 1970 World Championships
- Walter Nance (1933–2021), geneticist, retired to Sewanee
- Sada Tomlinson (1876–1953), nurse and missionary in China, born in Sewanee
