= John Templeton =

American-British financial manager and philanthropist (1912–2008)

Sir John Templeton
- Born: John Marks Templeton; 29 November 1912; Winchester, Tennessee, U.S.
- Died: 8 July 2008 (aged 95); Nassau, Bahamas
- Citizenship: United States (by birth); United Kingdom
- Education: Yale University (BA); Balliol College, Oxford (MA)
- Occupations: Investor, fund manager, and philanthropist
- Known for: Managing the Templeton Growth Fund; Endowing Templeton College, Oxford; Founding Templeton Religion Trust; Founding Templeton World Charity Foundation; Founding the John Templeton Foundation; Creating the Templeton Prize; Humility theology
- Board member of: Princeton Theological Seminary
- Spouses: Judith Folk (m. 1937; died 1951); Irene Reynolds Butler (m. 1958; died 1993)
- Children: John Jr., Anne, Christopher
- Awards: Rhodes Scholar; Knight Bachelor

Sir John Marks Templeton (29 November 1912 – 8 July 2008) was an American-born British investor, banker, fund manager, and philanthropist. In 1954, he entered the mutual fund market and created the Templeton Growth Fund, which averaged growth over 15% per year for 38 years. A pioneer of emerging market investing in the 1960s, Money magazine named him "arguably the greatest global stock picker of the century" in 1999.

== Early life and education ==
John Marks Templeton was born in the town of Winchester, Tennessee, and attended Yale University, where he was an assistant business manager for campus humor magazine Yale Record and was selected for membership in the Elihu society. He financed his tuition with a scholarship, odd jobs and winnings from playing poker, a game at which he excelled. He graduated in 1934 near the top of his class. He attended Balliol College, Oxford, as a Rhodes Scholar and earned an M.A. in law. He was a CFA charterholder and was a student of the "father of value investing", Benjamin Graham.

== Investment career ==
In 1939, Templeton, during the Depression of the 1930s, had his broker purchase 100 shares of each NYSE-listed company which was then selling for less than $1 a share (equivalent to $23 in 2,025) (104 companies, 37 in bankruptcy, in 1939), later making many times the money back when US industry picked up as a result of World War II. According to Templeton, he called his broker the day World War II began and instructed him to make the purchases. This strategy helped make him a wealthy man.

Templeton became a billionaire by pioneering the use of globally diversified mutual funds. His Templeton Growth Fund, Ltd. (investment fund), established in 1954, was among the first American firms to invest in Japan starting in the mid-1960s. Templeton also created funds specifically in certain industries such as nuclear energy, chemicals, and electronics. By 1959, Templeton's company made their initial public offering, with five funds and more than 66 million dollars under management.

In 2006 he was listed in a seven-way tie for 129th place on The Sunday Times's "Rich List".

== Investment philosophy ==
Money magazine in 1999 called him "arguably the greatest global stock picker of the century". Templeton attributed much of his success to his ability to maintain an elevated mood, avoid anxiety and stay disciplined. He rejected technical analysis for stock trading, preferring instead to use fundamental analysis. Thus he did not attempt to predict future stock movements, but paid close attention to valuation. From the late 1930s Templeton and his colleagues developed sophisticated quantitative finance methods that anticipated by decades common features such as the Shiller P/E, rebalancing and Tobin's q.

Despite the name of his flagship fund, Templeton Growth Fund, he was more a practitioner of value investing rather than growth investing. However, his stock-selection strategies could be eclectic and often defied easy categorization other than avoiding stocks he considered expensive, defined as an estimated five-year forward price to earnings ratio higher than about 12-14. Templeton focused on buying stocks he calculated were substantially undervalued, holding them until selling when their price rose to fair market value. His average holding period was about four years. He believed holding assets priced above fair market value in hopes they would further increase in price was speculation, not investing. However, Templeton did not buy stocks merely because they were undervalued but also took care investing in companies he determined were profitable, well-managed and with good long-term potential.

By emphasizing overlooked or unpopular stocks Templeton was in many ways a contrarian and became known for his "avoiding the herd" and "buy when there's blood in the streets" philosophy to take advantage of market turmoil. He also was known for taking profits when values and expectations were high. His time at Oxford started an interest in global investing, which was uncommon in the United States but more popular in the UK due to the widespread British Empire. Templeton was one of the earliest American investors to devote substantial focus to investment opportunities in then-overlooked foreign markets such as Asia and Eastern Europe. He was such an early investor in Japan during the 1950s that he had difficulty finding bi-lingual stockbrokers in either Japan or the United States to handle his firm's trades. Always on the lookout for bargain-priced stocks and hoping to avoid expensive stocks, he rotated out of Japanese stocks as they became more fashionable in the 1970s and turned to US stocks when they were at historic lows. Templeton's flagship fund outperformed a global stock index by an average of three percent a year for his entire career, and by over six percent a year for the period after his relocation to the Bahamas. Typical of value-oriented investors, Templeton often had disappointing results during bull markets due to his avoidance of hot stocks of the moment. His outperformance typically came during crashes and bear markets when his fund suffered smaller losses than average, or had modest gains relative to the broad market.

In 2005, he wrote a brief memorandum predicting that within five years there would be financial chaos in the world, anticipating a collapse of the housing market and decline in yields on government-issued bonds to near zero. Templeton also predicted within the next few decades a major decrease in traditional schooling due to internet-based learning options. Initially privately circulated to family and a small number of Franklin-Templeton management, the memo was eventually made public in 2010.

Templeton was a Chartered Financial Analyst (CFA) charter-holder. He received AIMR's first award for professional excellence in 1991.

== Personal life ==
Templeton married Judith Folk in 1937, and the couple had three children: John, Anne, and Christopher. Judith Templeton died in February 1951 in a motorbike accident. He remarried, to Irene Reynolds Butler in 1958; she died in 1993. A Christian, he was a lifelong member of the Presbyterian Church. He served as an elder of the First Presbyterian Church of Englewood (Englewood, New Jersey). He was a trustee on the board of Princeton Theological Seminary, the largest Presbyterian seminary, for 42 years and served as its chair for 12 years.

In 1964, Templeton renounced his US citizenship, which some sources claim was a strategy to minimize taxes (the United States taxes citizens globally regardless of residency). However, in a 1997 interview with Charlie Rose, Templeton asserted the Bahamas had a higher tax rate than the United States and denied he renounced his citizenship to avoid paying taxes to the United States, stating he intended to live out his life in the Bahamas and felt obligated. He held British citizenship and lived in the Bahamas full-time from 1968. His neighbors included Joe Lewis, Sean Connery, Arthur Hailey, and Fahad Al Sabah.

Uninterested in consumerism, Templeton lived relatively frugally and never flew first-class. A friend jokingly described Templeton as Calvinist in his approach to wealth: "He believes it's okay to make money so long as you don't enjoy it."

On 8 July 2008, Templeton died at Doctors Hospital in Nassau, Bahamas, of pneumonia at 12:20. He was 95, and was survived by two of his three children, Christopher and John Templeton Jr. His daughter, Anne Dudley Templeton Zimmerman, predeceased him in 2004, dying during heart surgery.

== Wealth and philanthropy ==
Templeton was one of the most generous philanthropists in history, giving away over $1 billion to charitable causes.

In 2007, Templeton was named to the Time 100 list as one of the world's 100 Most Influential People by Time under the category of "Power Givers". Time cited his "pursuit of spiritual understanding, often through scientific research" through his establishment of the John Templeton Foundation.

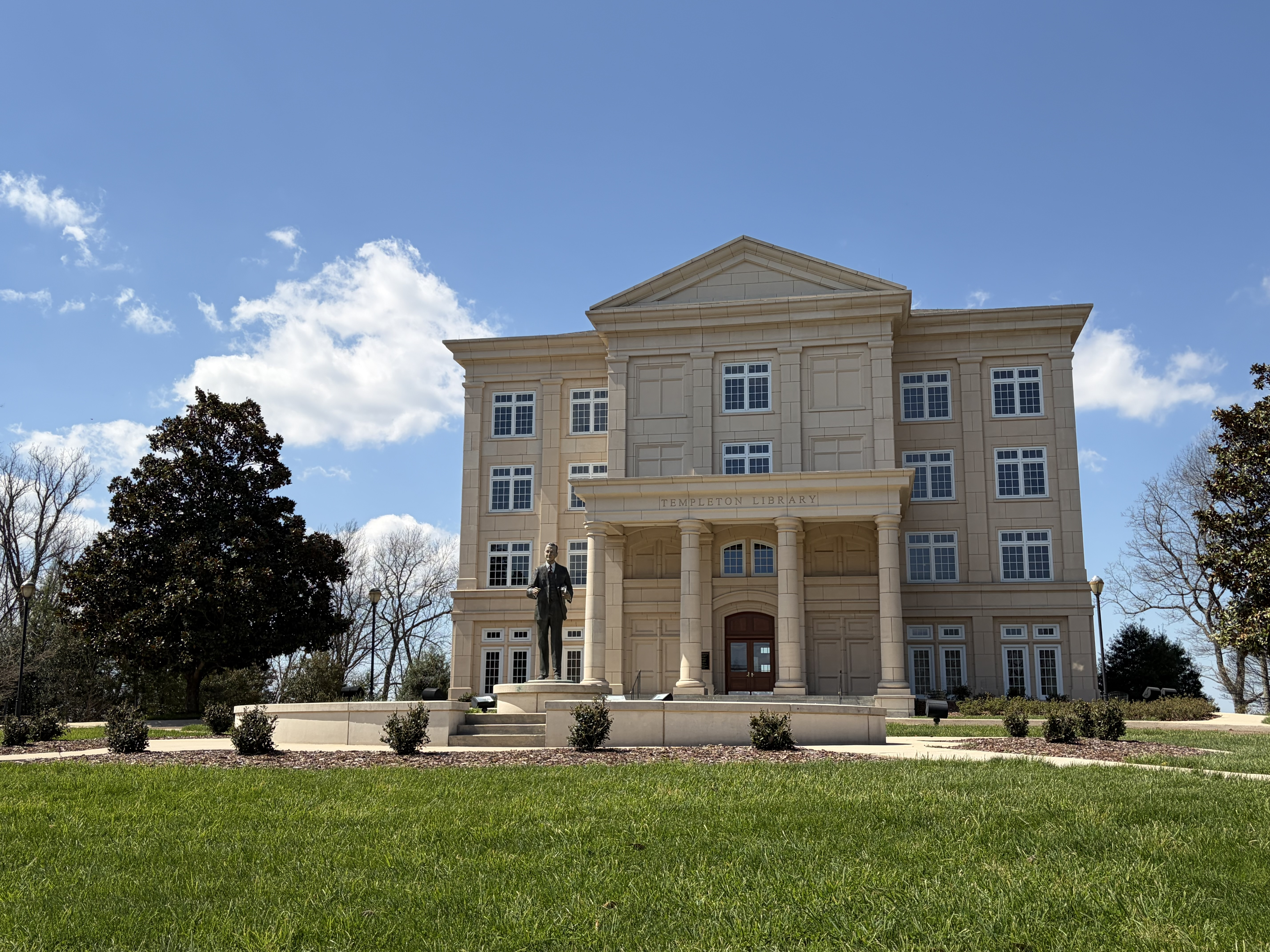
The Templeton Library built by Templeton in Sewanee, Tennessee

As a philanthropist, Templeton established:

- the Templeton Prize for Progress Toward Research or Discoveries about Spiritual Realities in 1972.
- the Templeton Library, located on an overlook of the Cumberland Plateau just outside Sewanee, Tennessee, faces his birthplace of Winchester, Tennessee, about 12 miles to the west. The mixed-use, four-story building houses his papers and "a collection of literature concerning science and religion, promoting scholarly research that combines the two fields".
- Templeton College of the University of Oxford (by endowing the Oxford Centre for Management Studies in 1983 to become a full college of the university by royal charter in 1995).

Templeton College is closely associated with Oxford's Saïd Business School. In 2007, Templeton College transferred its executive education program to Saïd Business School. In 2008, Templeton College merged with Green College to form Green Templeton College. This is one of the exceptional mergers in recent history of the University of Oxford.

He was created a Knight Bachelor in 1987 for his philanthropic efforts. Templeton was inducted into the Junior Achievement US Business Hall of Fame in 1996, and in 2003 awarded the William E. Simon Prize for Philanthropic Leadership.

=== Templeton Religion Trust ===
Templeton Religion Trust (TRT) is a global charitable trust chartered by Sir John Templeton in 1984, with headquarters in Nassau, The Bahamas, where Sir John lived until his death in 2008. TRT has been active since 2012 and supports projects and the dissemination of results from projects seeking to enrich the conversation about religion via three broad initiatives:

- Improving the methods of inquiry into the existence and nature of spiritual realities.
- Bringing about and enhancing the “conditions of possibility” of cooperative, constructive engagement (aka “Covenantal Pluralism”) in the context of religion.
- Establishing the fact and improving our understanding of the underlying dynamics of the often overlooked or unforeseen benefits of religious faith and practice at its best.

TRT's aim is to improve the well-being of individuals and societies through spiritual growth and an ever-improving understanding of spiritual realities and spiritual information.

TRT is the first of three charitable entities established by Sir John Templeton. The other entities are the John Templeton Foundation and the Templeton World Charity Foundation. While all three organizations have similar aims, they operate as separate charitable entities.

=== John Templeton Foundation ===
As a member of the Presbyterian Church, Templeton was dedicated to his faith. However, Templeton eschewed dogma and declared relatively little was known about the divine through scripture, espousing what he called a "humble approach" to theology and remaining open to the benefits and values of other faiths. Commenting on his commitment to what he called spiritual progress, "But why shouldn't I try to learn more? Why shouldn't I go to Hindu services? Why shouldn't I go to Muslim services? If you are not egotistical, you will welcome the opportunity to learn more." Similarly, one of the major goals of the John Templeton Foundation is to proliferate the monetary support of spiritual discoveries. The John Templeton Foundation encourages research into "big questions" by awarding philanthropic aid to institutions and people who pursue the answers to such questions through "explorations into the laws of nature and the universe, to questions on the nature of love, gratitude, forgiveness, and creativity."

In an interview published in the Financial Intelligence Report in 2005, Templeton asserts that the purpose of the John Templeton Foundation is as follows: "We are trying to persuade people that no human has yet grasped 1% of what can be known about spiritual realities. So we are encouraging people to start using the same methods of science that have been so productive in other areas, in order to discover spiritual realities." In 2004, Templeton donated an additional $550 million to the foundation.

== Publications and works ==
- The humble approach: Scientists discover God, 1981. ISBN 0-8164-0481-X
- Templeton Plan: 21 Steps to Personal Success and Real Happiness, 1992. ISBN 0-06-104178-5
- Discovering the Laws of Life, 1994. ISBN 0-8264-0861-3
- Is God the Only Reality? Science Points to a Deeper Meaning of the Universe, 1994. ISBN 0-8264-0650-5
- Golden Nuggets from Sir John Templeton, 1997. ISBN 1-890151-04-1
- Worldwide Laws of Life: 200 Eternal Spiritual Principles, 1998. ISBN 1-890151-15-7.
- Riches for the Mind and Spirit: John Marks Templeton's Treasury of Words to Help, Inspire, and Live By, 2006. ISBN 1-59947-101-9
- Investing the Templeton Way: The Market-Beating Strategies of Value Investing's Legendary Bargain Hunter, 2007. ISBN 978-0-07-154563-1
- Buying at the Point of Maximum Pessimism: Six Value Investing Trends from China to Oil to Agriculture, 2010. ISBN 978-0-13-703849-7

== See also ==
- Templeton Prize
- Franklin Templeton Investments
- Warren Buffett, another famous value investor and student of Benjamin Graham
