= Bruce L. Gordon =

Canadian philosopher (born 1963)

Bruce L. Gordon (born 1963) is a Canadian philosopher of science, metaphysician and philosopher of religion. He is a proponent of intelligent design and has been affiliated with the Discovery Institute since 1997.

== Biography ==
=== Early life and education ===
Gordon was born in Calgary, Alberta, Canada, in 1963.

Gordon earned two undergraduate degrees, one in piano performance at the Royal Conservatory of Music at the University of Toronto in 1982 and another in applied mathematics at the University of Calgary in 1986. He was awarded a master's degree in analytic philosophy from the University of Calgary in 1988. He moved to the United States for graduate study in 1988, and has been a permanent resident ever since. In 1990, Gordon received a master's degree in apologetics and systematic theology from Westminster Theological Seminary in Philadelphia. Finally, he was awarded a Ph.D. from Northwestern University in Evanston, Illinois in the history and philosophy of science (physics) in 1998.

=== Career ===
In 1997, he became an affiliate of the Discovery Institute.

He was a visiting assistant professor of philosophy at the University of Notre Dame and a Fellow in the Center for Philosophy of Religion at Notre Dame in 1998–1999.

In 1999, he was appointed as a non-tenured associate research professor at Baylor University, and was appointed as associate director of the short-lived Michael Polanyi Center there, which was directed by William Dembski. The center was a step forward in the Discovery Institute's wedge strategy in that it established a beachhead for intelligent design within a major US university. The Baylor faculty rejected the Center in 2000, Dembski was removed as director, and Gordon was appointed interim director. By 2001, the center had been renamed The Baylor Science and Religion Project and placed under the institute. By 2002, it had been again renamed to the Baylor Center for Science, Philosophy and Religion, still with Gordon at its head.

Gordon left Baylor in 2005 to join the Discovery Institute and by 2008 was the director of its Center for Science and Culture.

Gordon is a known proponent of intelligent design and Fellow of the International Society for Complexity, Information and Design (ISCID). He was the managing editor of the moribund Access Research Network journal Origin and Design, as of its last issue (20:1) and an associate editor of the likewise moribund ISCID journal.

In April 2010, Gordon was named associate professor of Science and Mathematics at The King's College, New York.

In 2012, he started working at Houston Baptist University.
