= Tennessee State Route 15 =

Highway in Tennessee

State Route 15
- SR 15; primary in red, unsigned in green

Route information
- Maintained by TDOT
- Length: 261.64 mi (421.07 km)
- Existed: October 1, 1923–present

Major junctions
- West end: SR 14 in Memphis
- US 70 / US 79 in Bartlett; I-40 in Lakeland; I-269 in Eads; US 45 in Selmer; US 641 in Clifton Junction; US 43 in Lawrenceburg; US 31 in Pulaski; I-65 in Frankewing; SR 50 / US 231 / US 431 in Fayetteville; I-24 / US 64 in Monteagle
- East end: US 41 / US 41A in Monteagle

Location
- Country: United States
- State: Tennessee
- Counties: Shelby, Fayette, Hardeman, McNairy, Hardin, Wayne, Lawrence, Giles, Lincoln, Franklin, Marion, Grundy

Highway system
- Tennessee State Routes; Interstate; US; State
← SR 14	→ SR 16

State Route 15 (SR 15) is a west–east route from Memphis to Monteagle. For much of its route, it has an unsigned concurrency with U.S. Route 64 (US 64). SR 15 does travel through the southern part of all three Grand Divisions of the state: West Tennessee, Middle Tennessee, and East Tennessee.

== Route description ==
=== Shelby County ===
SR 15 begins as a secondary highway in Shelby County in Northern Memphis at an interchange with SR 14 (Austin Peay Highway). It proceeds east to Bartlett and intersects US 70/US 79/US 64/SR 1, where it becomes the unsigned companion route of US 64 and becomes a primary highway. US 64/SR 15 then intersect SR 177 just before they have an interchange with I-40 (Exit 18) in Lakeland. They then go east and pass just north of Lenow before having an interchange with I-269 (Winfield Dunn Parkway/Memphis Outer Beltway) (Exit 15), in Eads. Less than 1/2 mile (0.80 km) away, they intersect with SR 205 before crossing into Fayette County.

=== Fayette County ===
US 64/SR 15 then passes through Hickory Withe and has a junction with SR 196. They then enter Oakland and have an intersection with SR 194, before continuing east. They continue through rural farmland, passing by Glengary Lake. US 64/SR 15 then enter Somerville and have an intersection with SR 76 in downtown. They then pass through Laconia, where they cross over the Loosahatchie River, before crossing into Hardeman County.

=== Hardeman County ===
They then enter Whiteville, where US 64 Business (US 64 Bus) begins and goes east through downtown while US 64/SR 15 follow a new bypass to the south. It also junctions with SR 179. They then meet up with the other end of US 64 Bus and go east to have an intersection with SR 100, before US 64/SR 15 leave Whitville and continue southeast. They then enter Bolivar and become concurrent with SR 18. They then enter downtown and have a junction with SR 125, with SR 18 splitting off and going north along that highway. US 64/SR 15 then leave Bolivar and continue east. They then go through some wooded areas, where they cross the Hatchie River, and pass through Hornsby before crossing into McNairy County.

=== McNairy County ===
They then intersect SR 225 before going through some rural wooded areas and then entering Selmer, at an interchange with US 45/SR 5, which US 64 follows as a new bypass to the south while SR 15 goes through downtown, signed as US 64 Bus. SR 15 then goes east through downtown and comes to another junction with US 45/US 64/SR 5, with the road continuing east as US 45/SR 5 and SR 15 joins US 64 again, and they go northeast. US 64/SR 15 then intersect and have a short concurrency with SR 224 just north of Stantonville before entering Adamsville. In Adamsville, they have an intersection with SR 22 and SR 117 in the center of town, with SR 22 joining the concurrency. US 64/SR 15/SR 22 then leave Adamsville and cross into Hardin County.

=== Hardin County ===
They then enter Crump and have an intersection and become concurrent with SR 69. A short distance later, SR 22 branches off and turns south. They then run along the banks of the Tennessee River before crossing it and entering Savannah. In Savannah, they immediately enter downtown and pass by the Tennessee River Museum, and becoming concurrent with SR 128 before coming to an intersection with SR 203, where SR 69 turns south, SR 203 goes east, and US 64/SR 15/SR 128 go northeast to leave Savannah. They then intersect SR 226 before north of Olivet before SR 128 splits off and goes north. US 64/SR 15 then go through some mountains and pass through Olivehill before crossing into Wayne County.

=== Wayne County ===
They enter Clifton Junction where they intersect US 641/SR 114. US 64/SR 15 then go through a narrow valley before entering Waynesboro, bypassing the city to the west and north. It then has an interchange with SR 13 and crosses over the Green River before going east to intersect with SR 99. US 64/SR 15 then leave Waynesboro and continue east through mountainous terrain. They then enter some farmland and have an interchange with the Natchez Trace Parkway just before crossing into Lawrence County.

=== Lawrence County ===
They then intersect with SR 240 in Deerfield and then SR 241 just a little further to the east. They then enter Lawrenceburg. Just west of downtown, US 64 Bus begins and goes east into downtown, while US 64/SR 15 follow a new bypass to the south. They then have an interchange with SR 242 and cross over Shoal Creek, just south of New Shoal Creek Dam, shortly thereafter. They then have an interchange with US 43/SR 6 before passing through largely rural areas. They then come back around to meet the other end of US 64 Bus before leaving Lawrenceburg and continuing east through more mountains. US 64/SR 15 then cross into Giles County.

=== Giles County ===
It then passes through Bodenham before intersecting and becoming concurrent with SR 166 and entering Pulaski. US 64 then bypasses the city to the south with SR 15/SR 166 going into downtown. SR 166 splits and turns south at an intersection with SR 11, with SR 11 becoming concurrent with SR 15. They then come to an intersection with US 31/SR 7, where SR 11 splits off and goes north along that highway. SR 15 then goes east back to US 64, where they continue east together. They go through some more mountains before coming to an interchange with I-65 (Exit 14) in Frankewing. US 64/SR 15 then cross into Lincoln County.

=== Lincoln County ===
They then pass through Boonshill and intersect with SR 244. They then intersect with SR 273 before entering Fayetteville and coming to an intersection with US 64 Bypass (US 64 Byp), a new southern bypass of the city. US 64/SR 15 then go through downtown to intersect SR 50/US 431 and become concurrent with SR 50. They then come to another intersection with US 64 Byp, which at this point is also concurrent with US 231/SR 10. SR 50 then splits off and goes north at another intersection before US 64/SR 15 go east and leave Fayetteville. They continue east through farmland and mountains to cross the Elk River before passing through Kelso. They then pass just north of Flintville and junction with SR 275. They then intersect and have a short concurrency with SR 121 before entering Franklin County.

=== Franklin County ===
US 64/SR 15 then enter Huntland, where they have a junction with SR 122 and SR 97. They then pass through Belvidere before entering Winchester and having an interchange with SR 16, which provides access to downtown as US 64/SR 433 bypass it to the southeast, and SR 15 splits from US 64 again to follow SR 16, becoming a secondary highway. They then have an intersection with US 41A and SR 50, where SR 15 splits from SR 16 to follow US 41A. US 41A/SR 15 then goes through Cowan and goes east to a long narrow mountain pass. They then enter Sewanee and become concurrent with SR 56. They go east to Saint Andrews where they intersect SR 156 before crossing into Marion County.

=== Marion and Grundy Counties ===
It then straddles the line with Grundy County before having an interchange with I-24/US 64 (Exit 134) and becoming a primary highway again. They then enter Monteagle and SR 15 ends at an intersection with US 41/SR 2 just west of downtown.

== Major intersections ==
County	Location	mi	km	Destinations	Notes
Shelby	Memphis	0.0	0.0	SR 14 (Austin Peay Highway) to I-40 – Downtown, Rosemark	Interchange; western terminus
Shelby	Memphis			SR 204 (Covington Pike)	
Shelby	Bartlett			US 64 west / US 70 / US 79 (Summer Avenue/SR 1) – Memphis, Arlington	Western end of unsigned US 64 concurrency
Shelby	Bartlett			SR 177 (Germantown Road) – Germantown, Brunswick	
Shelby	Bartlett			I-40 – Memphis, Nashville	I-40 exit 18
Shelby	Eads			I-269 (Winfield Dunn Parkway) – Arlington, Collierville	I-269 exit 15; Memphis Outer Beltway
Shelby	Eads			SR 205 (Airline Road) – Collierville, Fisherville, Arlington	
Fayette	Hickory Withe			SR 196 (Chulahoma Road) – Piperton, Gallaway	
Fayette	Oakland			SR 194 (Church Street) – Braden, Macon, Rossville	
Fayette	Somerville			SR 76 (Main Street) – Brownsville, Williston, Moscow	
Fayette	Laconia			Bridge over the Loosahatchie River	
Hardeman	Whiteville			US 64 Bus. east (W Main Street) – Downtown	Western terminus of US 64 Bus
Hardeman	Whiteville			SR 179 west (S Cross Avenue)	Eastern terminus of SR 179
Hardeman	Whiteville			US 64 Bus. west (E Main Street) – Downtown	Eastern terminus of US 64 Bus
Hardeman	Whiteville			SR 100 east – Toone, Henderson	Western terminus of SR 100
Hardeman	Bolivar			SR 18 south (Tennessee Street) – Hickory Valley, Grand Junction	Western end of SR 18 concurrency
Hardeman	Bolivar			SR 18 north / SR 125 (Main Street) – Middleton, Toone	Eastern end of SR 18 concurrency
Hardeman				Bridge over the Hatchie River	
McNairy				SR 225 north (Woodville Road)	Southern terminus of SR 225
McNairy	Selmer			US 45 east / US 64 (Marcus J. Wright Memorial Highway/SR 5) / US 64 Bus. begins – Bethel Springs, Henderson, Adamsville, Corinth, MS	Interchange; eastern end of unsigned US 64 concurrency; western end of unsigned US 64 Bus concurrency; western terminus of US 64 Bus
McNairy	Selmer			N Railroad Street to Purdy Road - Purdy	
McNairy	Selmer			US 45 / US 64 east (Marcus J. Wright Memorial Highway/Mulberry Avenue/SR 5) – Bolivar, Henderson, Eastview, Corinth, MS	Eastern terminus of US 64 Bus; western end of unsigned US 64 concurrency
McNairy				Airport Road – Robert Sibley Airport	
McNairy				SR 224 south (Gilchrist Stantonville Road) – Stantonville, Michie	Western end of SR 224 concurrency
McNairy				SR 224 north (Leapwood Enville Road) – Enville	Eastern end of SR 224 concurrency
McNairy	Adamsville			SR 22 north / SR 117 south (Maple Street) – Milledgeville, Stantonville	Western end of SR 22 concurrency; northern terminus of SR 117; SR 117 south provides access to Shiloh National Military Park
Hardin	Crump			SR 69 north (Morris Chapel Road) – Milledgeville	Western end of SR 69 concurrency
Hardin	Crump			SR 22 south – Michie	Eastern end of SR 22 concurrency; provides access to Shiloh National Military Park
Hardin	Savannah			Bridge over the Tennessee River	
Hardin	Savannah			US 64 Truck east (Water Street)	Western terminus of US 64 Truck
Hardin	Savannah			SR 128 south (Pickwick Street) – Walkertown, Pickwick Dam	Western end of SR 128 concurrency; provides access to Pickwick Landing State Park and Pickwick Landing Dam
Hardin	Savannah			SR 69 south / US 64 Truck west (Main Street) – Walkertown, Walnut Grove, Florence, AL	Eastern end of SR 69 concurrency; eastern terminus of US 64 Truck; provides access to Savannah-Hardin County Airport
Hardin	Olivet			SR 226 south (Airport Road) – Olivet, Maddox	Northern terminus of SR 226; provides access to Savannah-Hardin County Airport
Hardin				SR 128 north (New Highway 128) – Clifton	Eastern end of SR 128 concurrency
Wayne	Clifton Junction			US 641 north (Billy Nance Highway/SR 114 north) – Clifton	Southern terminus of US 641/SR 114
Wayne	Waynesboro			SR 13 (N High Street/Waynesboro Highway) – Collinwood, Downtown, Linden	Interchange
Wayne	Waynesboro			Bridge over the Green River	
Wayne	Waynesboro			SR 99 east (Old US Highway 64 E) – Hohenwald	Western terminus of SR 99
Wayne–Lawrence county line				Natchez Trace Parkway	Interchange
Lawrence	Deerfield			SR 240 north – Henryville, Summertown	Southern terminus of SR 240
Lawrence	Deerfield			SR 241 north (Red Hill Center Road) – Henryville	Southern terminus of SR 241
Lawrence	Lawrenceburg			US 64 Bus. east (E Gaines Street) – Downtown	Western terminus of US 64 Bus; provides access to David Crockett State Park
Lawrence	Lawrenceburg			SR 242 (West Point Road) – Iron City, West Point, Downtown	Interchange; provides access to David Crockett State Park
Lawrence	Lawrenceburg			Ivan Johnston Bridge over Shoal Creek	
Lawrence	Lawrenceburg			New Power House Road - New Shoal Creek Dam	
Lawrence	Lawrenceburg			US 43 (S Locust Avenue/Andrew Jackson Highway/SR 6) – Florence, AL, Loretto, Downtown, Columbia	Interchange
Lawrence	Lawrenceburg			US 64 Bus. west (E Gaines Street) – Downtown	Eastern terminus of US 64 Bus; provides access to Lawrenceburg-Lawrence County Airport
Giles				SR 166 north (Campbellsville Road) – Campbellsville, Mount Pleasant	Western end of SR 166 concurrency
Giles	Pulaski			US 64 east (Lawrenceburg Highway) to I-65 – Fayetteville	Western end of unsigned US 64 concurrency; southern bypass of Pulaski; SR 15 becomes a signed primary highway
Giles	Pulaski			SR 11 south / SR 166 south (S 7th Street) – Minor Hill, Goodspring, Bethel, Elkmont, AL	Western end of SR 11 concurrency; eastern end of SR 166 concurrency; provides access to Abernathy Field
Giles	Pulaski			US 31 (1st Street/SR 7/SR 11 north) – Ardmore, Elkton, Lynnville, Columbia	Eastern end of SR 11 concurrency
Giles	Pulaski			US 64 west (Fayetteville Highway) – Lawrenceburg	Eastern end of unsigned US 64 concurrency; southern bypass of Pulaski; SR 15 becomes unsigned
Giles	Frankewing			I-65 – Nashville, Huntsville	I-65 exit 14
Lincoln	Boonshill			SR 244 north (Boonshill Petersburg Road) – Petersburg	Southern terminus of SR 244
Lincoln				SR 273 west (Old Elkton Pike) – Dellrose, Elkton	Western end of unsigned SR 273 concurrency
Lincoln	Fayetteville			US 64 Byp. east (Wilson Parkway) – Winchester	Western terminus of US 64 Bypass; southern bypass of Fayetteville
Lincoln	Fayetteville			US 431 / SR 50 west (Main Avenue/SR 273 east) – Lewisburg, Petersburg, Park City, Huntsville, AL	Western end of SR 50 concurrency; eastern end of unsigned SR 273 concurrency; provides access to Fayetteville Municipal Airport
Lincoln	Fayetteville			US 64 Byp. west / US 231 (Thornton Taylor Parkway/SR 10) – Shelbyville, Pulaski, Park City, Huntsville	Eastern terminus of US 64 Bypass; southern bypass around Fayetteville
Lincoln	Fayetteville			SR 50 east (Lynchburg Highway) – Lynchburg	Eastern end of SR 50 concurrency
Lincoln	Kelso			Bridge over the Elk River	
Lincoln				SR 275 west (Flintville Road) – Flintville	Eastern terminus of SR 275
Lincoln				SR 121 south (Elora Road) – Elora	Western end of SR 121 concurrency
Lincoln				SR 121 north (Shady Grove Road) – Broadview	Eastern end of SR 121 concurrency; provides access to Tims Ford Dam/Lake
Franklin	Huntland			SR 122 west (Main Street) – Huntland	Eastern terminus of SR 122
Franklin	Winchester			US 64 (Veterans Memorial Drive/SR 433 north) / US 64 Bus. (David Crockett Highway) / SR 16 (Rowe Gap Road) / SR 50 (George Fraley Parkway) to I-24 – Decherd, Lynchburg, Hytop, AL, Skyline, AL	Interchange; southern terminus of SR 433; eastern end of unsigned US 64 concurrency; western terminus of US 64 Bus.; western end of SR 16 and SR 50 concurrencies; US 64 east provides access to Winchester Municipal Airport
Franklin	Winchester			SR 130 west (High Street) – Tullahoma	Eastern terminus of SR 130; former western end of SR 50 concurrency
Franklin	Winchester			US 41A north / SR 50 east (Dinah Shore Boulevard/S College Street/SR 16 north) – Decherd	Eastern terminus of US 64 Bus.; eastern end of SR 16/SR 50 concurrency; western end of US 41A concurrency
Franklin	Winchester			US 64 (Veterans Memorial Drive/SR 433) to I-24 – Fayetteville, Pelham	Interchange
Franklin	Winchester			Aviation Drive – Winchester Municipal Airport	Access road into airport
Franklin	Sewanee			SR 56 south (Sherwood Road) – Sherwood	Western end of SR 56 concurrency
Franklin	Saint Andrews			SR 156 south (Midway Road) – Orme, South Pittsburg	Northern terminus of SR 156; provides access to Franklin County Airport and Franklin State Forest
Marion–Grundy county line	Monteagle			I-24 / US 64 – Nashville, Chattanooga	I-24/US 64 exit 134
Marion–Grundy county line	Monteagle	261.64	421.07	US 41 (Dixie Highway/W Main Street/SR 2/SR 56 north) – Manchester, Downtown, Tracy City	Eastern terminus; southern terminus of US 41A; SR 15 ends as an unsigned primary highway
1.000 mi = 1.609 km; 1.000 km = 0.621 mi: Concurrency terminus

== See also ==
- List of state routes in Tennessee
