= Tennessee State Route 128 =

State highway in Tennessee, United States

State Route 128
- SR 128; primary in red, secondary in blue

Route information
- Maintained by TDOT
- Length: 51.73 mi (83.25 km)

Major junctions
- South end: SR 57 in Pickwick Dam
- US 64 / SR 69 in Savannah; US 641 in Clifton
- North end: SR 13 south of Linden

Location
- Country: United States
- State: Tennessee
- Counties: Hardin, Wayne, Perry

Highway system
- Tennessee State Routes; Interstate; US; State
← SR 127	→ US 129

State Route 128 (SR 128) is a state highway in western and western Middle Tennessee.

It connects Pickwick Dam with Linden, via Savannah and Clifton.

== Route description ==
=== Hardin County ===
SR 128 begins as a primary highway in Hardin County in the community of Pickwick Dam at an intersection with SR 57, just north of the Mississippi state line. The highway then goes north and crosses overtop of Pickwick Landing Dam, which impounds the Tennessee River, before leaving Pickwick Dam and continuing north through rural areas. It then passes through the communities of Nixon, where it has an intersection with SR 226, and Walkertown before entering the city of Savannah and coming to an intersection and becoming concurrent with US 64/SR 15/SR 69 in downtown. The highway then turns west and immediately comes to an intersection where SR 69 splits off and goes south. They then leave downtown and pass through a major business district and several neighborhoods before leaving Savannah and continuing east through rural areas, right after having another intersection with SR 226 and widening to a 4-lane divided highway. SR 128 then splits off from US 64/SR 15 and goes north again shortly afterwards and travels through mostly wooded areas for the next several miles, where it passes through the community of Crossroads. SR 128 then comes to an intersection and becomes concurrent with US 641/SR 114, where it becomes a secondary highway shortly before crossing into Wayne County.

=== Wayne County ===
US 641/SR 114/SR 128 parallel the Tennessee River as they enter the town of Clifton, where SR 128 splits from US 641/SR 114 to pass through downtown. SR 128 then turns north again to leave Clifton just shortly before having an intersection with SR 228. SR 128 then enters rural areas as it crosses into Perry County.

Throughout the entire concurrency with US 641/SR 114 and up to the intersection with SR 228, SR 128 is signed as an east–west highway.

=== Perry County ===
The highway then becomes curvy as it enters some mountains and wooded areas. It continues winding its way through the mountains for several miles before coming to an end at an intersection with SR 13 just south of Linden.

== Major intersections ==
County	Location	mi	km	Destinations	Notes
Hardin	Pickwick Dam	0.0	0.0	SR 57 – Memphis, Iuka	Southern terminus
Hardin				SR 226 north (Airport Road) – Olivet	Southern terminus of SR 226; provides access to Savannah-Hardin County Airport
Hardin	Savannah			US 64 Truck (Water Street)	
Hardin	Savannah			US 64 west / SR 69 north (Main Street/SR 15 west) – Crump, Adamsville	Southern end of US 64/SR 15 concurrency; Southern end of SR 69 wrong-way concurrency
Hardin	Savannah			US 64 Truck west / SR 69 south (Main Street) to SR 203 – Florence, Alabama	Northern end of SR 69 wrong-way concurrency; eastern terminus of US 64 Truck
Hardin	Olivet			SR 226 south (Airport Road) – Olivet, Maddox	Northern terminus of SR 226; provides access to Savannah-Hardin County Airport
Hardin				US 64 east (SR 15 east) – Waynesboro	Northern end of US 64/SR 15 concurrency
Hardin				US 641 north (SR 114 north) – Decaturville	Southern end of US 641/SR 114 wrong-way concurrency; begin east-west SR 128
Wayne	Clifton			US 641 south (Billy Nance Boulevard/SR 114 south) – Waynesboro	Northern end of US 641/SR 114 wrong-way concurrency
Wayne	Clifton			Airport Road – Hassell-Carroll Field Airport	
Wayne	Clifton			SR 228 east (Morrison Creek Road) – Leatherwood	Western terminus of SR 228; end east-west SR 128
Perry		51.73	83.25	SR 13 – Linden, Waynesboro	Northern terminus; provides access to James Tucker Airport
1.000 mi = 1.609 km; 1.000 km = 0.621 mi: Concurrency terminus
