= Tennessee State Route 203 =

State highway in Tennessee, United States

State Route 203
- SR 203 highlighted in red

Route information
- Maintained by TDOT
- Length: 32.7 mi (52.6 km)
- Existed: July 1, 1983–present

Major junctions
- West end: SR 69 in Savannah
- East end: SR 13 in Collinwood

Location
- Country: United States
- State: Tennessee
- Counties: Hardin, Wayne

Highway system
- Tennessee State Routes; Interstate; US; State
← SR 202	→ SR 204

State Route 203 (SR 203) is a state highway in Tennessee that runs in an east-to-west direction from the city of Collinwood, in Wayne County to the city of Savannah in Hardin County. The highway lies both in Middle and West Tennessee.

== Route description ==
=== Hardin County ===
SR 203 begins in Hardin County in West Tennessee in Savannah at an intersection with SR 69 in downtown, just feet from that highway's intersection with US 64/SR 15 and SR 128. It goes east through some neighborhoods before leaving Savannah and passing through Olivet, where it has a short concurrency with SR 226, before continuing east through rural areas. The highway then enters the mountains of the Highland Rim and passes through them for several miles before crossing into Wayne County and Middle Tennessee.

=== Wayne County ===
SR 203 continues east through the mountains and passes through Lutts, where it makes a sharp right turn onto Bear Creek Road. The highway then continues east through the mountains to enter Collinwood, where it comes to an end at an intersection with SR 13 just south of downtown.

== Major intersections ==
County	Location	mi	km	Destinations	Notes
Hardin	Savannah	0.0	0.0	SR 69 / US 64 Truck (Florence Road) – Crump, Walnut Grove, Florence, AL	Western terminus
Hardin	Olivet			SR 226 south (Airport Road) – Maddox	Western end of SR 226 concurrency; provides access to Savannah-Hardin County Airport
Hardin	Olivet			SR 226 north (Airport Road) to US 64	Eastern end of SR 226 concurrency
Wayne	Collinwood	32.7	52.6	SR 13 – Waynesboro, Downtown, Florence, AL	Eastern terminus
1.000 mi = 1.609 km; 1.000 km = 0.621 mi: Concurrency terminus
