= Tennessee State Route 242 =

State highway in Tennessee, United States

State Route 242
- SR 242 highlighted in red

Route information
- Maintained by TDOT
- Length: 36.7 mi (59.1 km)
- Existed: July 1, 1983–present

Major junctions
- South end: SR 227 in Iron City
- US 64 in Lawrenceburg
- North end: SR 240 in Henryville

Location
- Country: United States
- State: Tennessee
- Counties: Lawrence, Wayne

Highway system
- Tennessee State Routes; Interstate; US; State
← SR 241	→ SR 243

State Route 242 (SR 242) is a 36.7 miles (59.1 km) north-south state highway that lies mostly in Lawrence County, Tennessee, United States. It connects Iron City with Henryville via Westpoint and Lawrenceburg.

== Route description ==
SR 242 begins in Lawrence County in Iron City at an intersection with SR 227. It heads north as Wayland Springs Road to temporarily cross into Wayne County before returning to Lawrence County and leaving Iron City to wind its way northeast through mountains, running parallel to Shoal Creek. It then crosses over Factory Creek to pass through Westpoint before winding its way through some more mountains as West Point Road. The highway then enters farmland shortly before entering Lawrenceburg at an interchange with US 64/SR 15. SR 242 turns northward to pass through some neighborhoods before coming to an intersection and becoming concurrent with US 64 Business (W Gaines Street). They head east along the southern end of David Crockett State Park before crossing Shoal Creek and entering downtown, where SR 242 splits off and heads north along Buffalo Road. SR 242 passes by some neighborhoods and businesses before leaving Lawrenceburg and passing through farmland. The highway then splits off onto Henryville Road and heads northwest through rural areas before entering Henryville and coming to an end at an intersection with SR 240.

== Major intersections ==
County	Location	mi	km	Destinations	Notes
Lawrence	Iron City	0.0	0.0	SR 227 (Iron City Road) – Fairview, Saint Joseph	Southern terminus
Wayne	No major junctions				
Lawrence	Lawrenceburg			US 64 (SR 15) – Waynesboro, Pulaski	Interchange
Lawrence	Lawrenceburg			US 64 Bus. west (W Gaines Street)	Southern end of US 64 Business concurrency
Lawrence	Lawrenceburg			Davy Crockett Park Road - David Crockett State Park	Access road into park
Lawrence	Lawrenceburg			Bridge over Shoal Creek	
Lawrence	Lawrenceburg			US 64 Bus. east (W Gaines Street)	Northern end of US 64 Business concurrency
Lawrence	Henryville	36.7	59.1	SR 240 (Turnpike) – Summertown	Northern terminus
1.000 mi = 1.609 km; 1.000 km = 0.621 mi: Concurrency terminus
