= Tennessee State Route 226 =

State highway in Tennessee, United States

State Route 226
- Airport Road
- SR 226 highlighted in red

Route information
- Maintained by TDOT
- Length: 7.0 mi (11.3 km)
- Existed: July 1, 1983–present

Major junctions
- South end: SR 128 near Walkertown
- SR 69 in Maddox; SR 203 in Olivet
- North end: US 64 / SR 128 in Olivet

Location
- Country: United States
- State: Tennessee
- Counties: Hardin

Highway system
- Tennessee State Routes; Interstate; US; State
← SR 225	→ SR 227

State Route 226 (SR 226), also known as Airport Road, is a 7.0-mile-long (11.3 km) north–south state highway in Hardin County, Tennessee.

== Route description ==
SR 226 begins just south of Walkertown at an intersection with SR 128. It goes through wooded areas to pass through Maddox, where it has an intersection with SR 69 and passes by the Savannah-Hardin County Airport. The highway then turns northward through farmland to enter Olivet and have a short concurrency with SR 203. SR 226 then comes to an end shortly thereafter at an intersection with US 64/SR 128 (SR 15). The entire route of SR 226 is a two-lane highway.

== Major intersections ==
The entire route is in Hardin County.

Location	mi	km	Destinations	Notes
	0.0	0.0	SR 128 – Savannah, Pickwick Landing Dam, Pickwick Landing State Park	Southern terminus
Maddox	2.2	3.5	SR 69 – Savannah, Florence, AL	
Maddox	3.0	4.8	Airport Lane - Savannah-Hardin County Airport	Access road into airport
Olivet	5.9	9.5	SR 203 west – Savannah	Southern end of SR 203 concurrency
Olivet	6.1	9.8	SR 203 east – Lutts, Collinwood	Northern end of SR 203 concurrency
Olivet	7.0	11.3	US 64 / SR 128 (SR 15) – Savannah, Clifton, Waynesboro	Northern terminus
1.000 mi = 1.609 km; 1.000 km = 0.621 mi: Concurrency terminus
