= Tennessee State Route 228 =

State highway in Tennessee, United States

State Route 228
- SR 228 highlighted in red

Route information
- Maintained by TDOT
- Length: 11.1 mi (17.9 km)
- Existed: July 1, 1983–present

Major junctions
- West end: SR 128 in Clifton
- East end: SR 13 north of Waynesboro

Location
- Country: United States
- State: Tennessee
- Counties: Wayne

Highway system
- Tennessee State Routes; Interstate; US; State
← SR 227	→ SR 229

State Route 228 (SR 228) is an 11.1-mile-long (17.9 km) east–west state highway located entirely in the mountains of northern Wayne County, Tennessee.

== Route description ==
SR 228 begins in Clifton at an intersection with SR 128 northeast of downtown and just north Hassell-Carroll Field Airport. It goes east as Morrison Creek Road to wind its way through mountains to leave Clifton and come to an intersection with Beech Creek Road, where SR 228 makes a sharp right turn to follow that road. The highway then traverses a narrow valley for several miles, where it passes through the community of Leatherwood. SR 228 then turns northeast and makes a very steep ascent up a mountain before coming to an end at an intersection with SR 13 between Waynesboro and Linden. The entire route of SR 228 is a two-lane highway and lies entirely on the Highland Rim.

== Major intersections ==
The entire route is in Wayne County.

Location	mi	km	Destinations	Notes
Clifton	0.0	0.0	SR 128 (Linden Highway) – Linden, Downtown, Savannah	Western terminus
	11.1	17.9	SR 13 (Waynesboro Highway) – Waynesboro, Linden	Eastern terminus
1.000 mi = 1.609 km; 1.000 km = 0.621 mi
