= Special routes of U.S. Route 64 =

Special routes of U.S. Route 64

Highway system
- United States Numbered Highway System; List; Special; Divided

Several special routes of U.S. Route 64 exist. In order from west to east they are as follows.

== New Mexico ==
=== Farmington business loop ===
U.S. Highway 64 Business
- Location: Farmington, New Mexico
- Length: 3.1 mi (5.0 km)

U.S. Route 64 Business (US 64 Bus.) goes through downtown Farmington, via Main Street and Broadway Avenue. Mainline US 64 is signed as both Bypass and Truck route, going south around Farmington, via Murray Drive.

== Oklahoma ==
=== Muskogee business loop ===
U.S. Highway 64 Business
- Location: Muskogee, Oklahoma
- Length: 4.8 mi (7.7 km)
- Existed: 1960–present

U.S. Route 64 Business (US-64 Bus.) was established in 1960, replacing the old mainline US-64 through downtown Muskogee, via Okmulgee Avenue and South Main Street. It also has an overlap with U.S. Route 62 Business along Okmulgee Avenue.

=== Alma business route ===
U.S. Highway 64B
- Location: Alma, Arkansas
- Length: 1.10 mi (1.77 km)
- Existed: July 28, 1965–2025

U.S. Route 64 Business (Hwy. 64B or US 64B) was an east–west highway in Alma. The route connected US 64 to Highway 162 along a former alignment of US 64 in the city. The route was designated by the Arkansas State Highway Commission on July 28, 1965.

Major intersections

The entire route is in Alma, Crawford County.

mi	km	Destinations	Notes
1.10	1.77	AR 162	Western terminus
0.00	0.00	US 64	Eastern terminus
1.000 mi = 1.609 km; 1.000 km = 0.621 mi

== Arkansas ==
=== Vilonia business loop ===
U.S. Highway 64B
- Location: Vilonia, Arkansas
- Length: 8.37 mi (13.47 km)
- Existed: October 11, 2011–present

U.S. Route 64 Business (US 64B) was established October 11, 2011, following the former alignment of US 64. It traverses through downtown Vilonia, via Main Street.

=== Augusta business loop ===
U.S. Highway 64B
- Location: Augusta, Arkansas
- Length: 1.07 mi (1.72 km)
- Existed: 1956–present

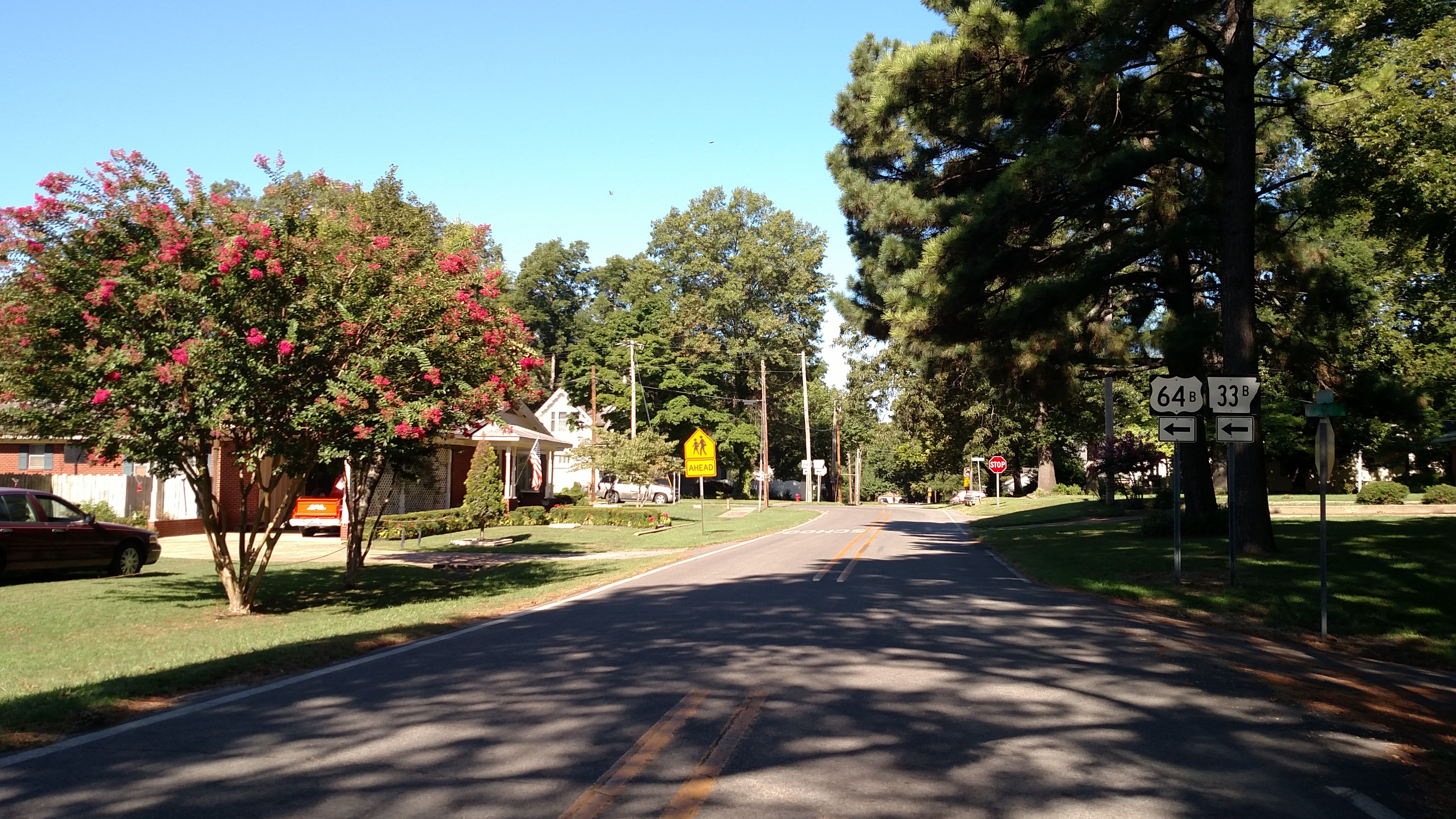
US 64B/AR 33B turn left in Augusta

U.S. Route 64 Business (US 64B) was established on May 9, 1956, following the former alignment of US 64. It traverses through downtown Augusta, via 5th Street, Magnolia Street, 3rd Street, and Main Street.

=== Patterson–McCrory business route ===
U.S. Highway 64B
- Location: Patterson–McCrory, Arkansas
- Length: 5.15 mi (8.29 km)
- Existed: 1968–present

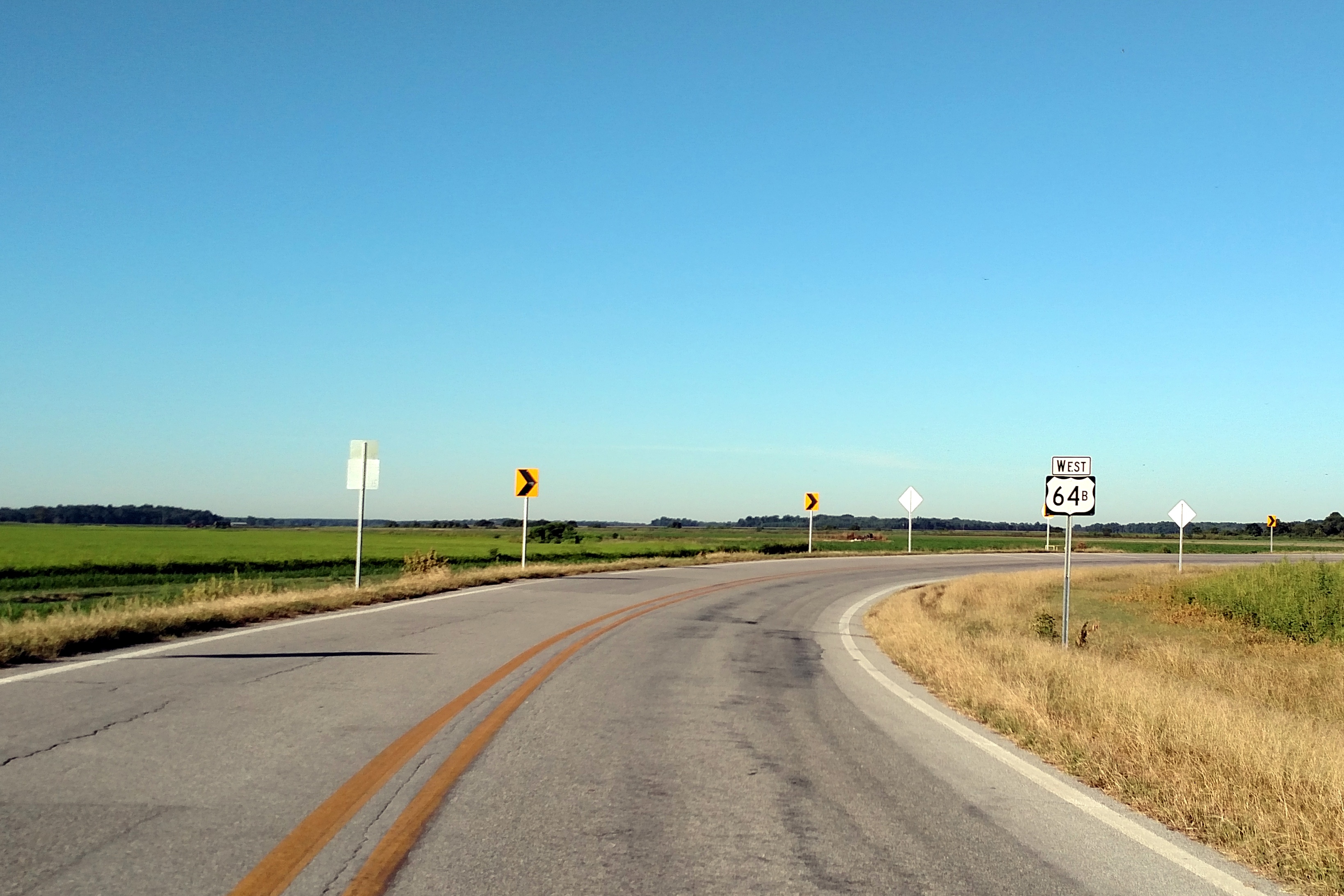
US 64B near its eastern terminus

U.S. Route 64 Business (US 64B) was established in 1968, it goes through Patterson and McCrory.

=== Wynne spur route ===
U.S. Highway 64S
- Location: Wynne, Arkansas
- Length: 1.052 mi (1.693 km)
- Existed: May 23, 1985–present

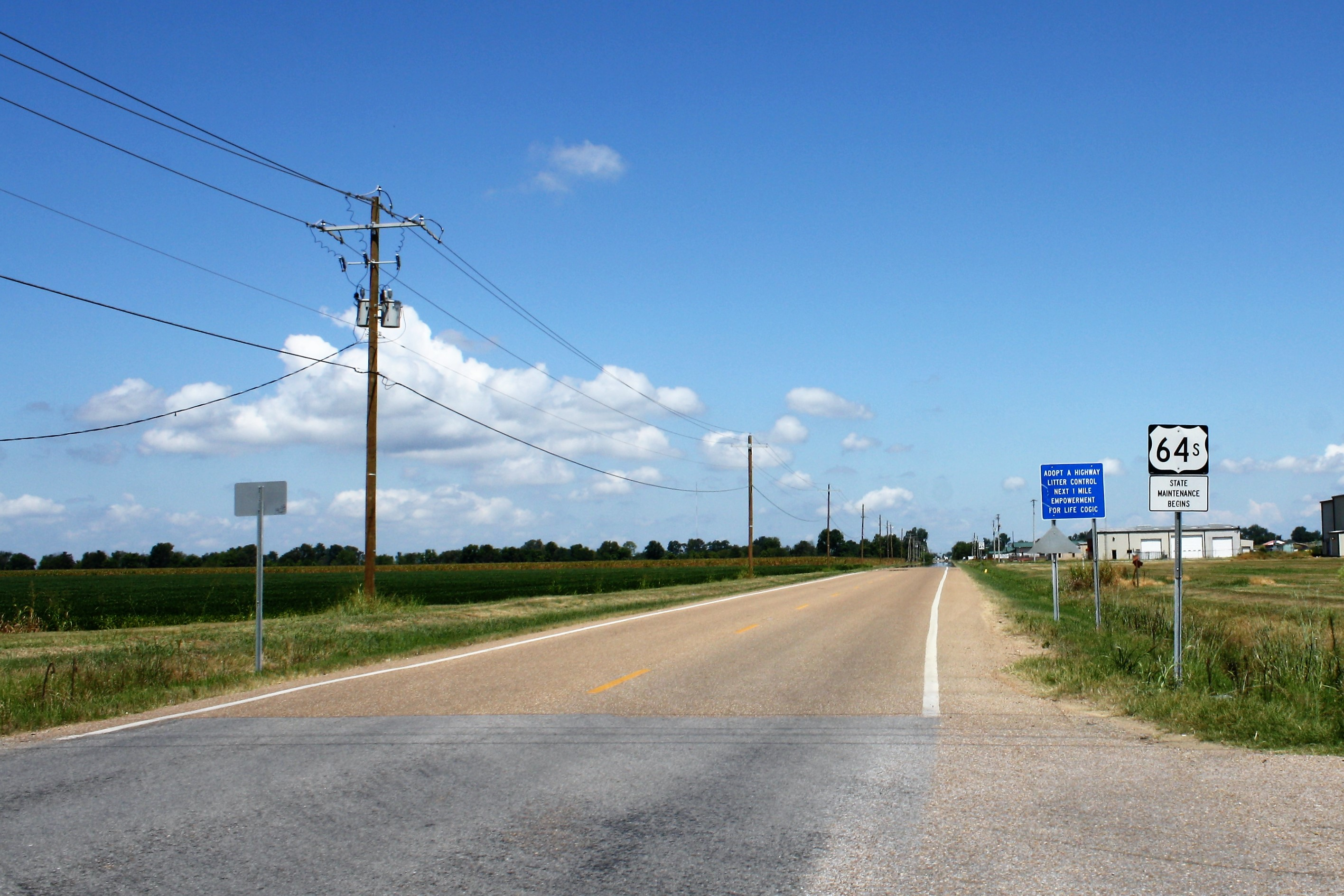
Southern terminus

U.S. Route 64 Spur (US 64S) is a north–south spur route in Wynne. The highway serves as an alternate north–south highway to Highway 1 between a residential section of Wynne and US 64. The highway was created for access to an industrial park at the request of City of Wynne officials in 1985.

The highway begins at an intersection with US 64 and Highway 1 in northern Wynne in the Arkansas Delta. It runs due south as a section line road through an industrial and agricultural area to John Brown Road, where state maintenance ends. The roadway continues south under city maintenance as Martin Luther King Street.

Major intersections

The entire route is in Wynne, Cross County.

mi	km	Destinations	Notes
0.000	0.000	US 64 / AR 1 – Bald Knob, West Memphis, Jonesboro	Northern terminus
1.052	1.693	John Brown Road, end state maintenance	Southern terminus, roadway continues south under city maintenance
1.000 mi = 1.609 km; 1.000 km = 0.621 mi

=== Wynne business spur ===
U.S. Highway 64B
- Location: Wynne, Arkansas
- Length: 4.36 mi (7.02 km)

U.S. Route 64 Business (US 64B) starts from US 64 and goes west into downtown Wynne, ending at Falls Boulevard (AR 1). It does not reconnect to US 64, making it a business spur; not to be confused with US 64 Spur, located northwest of Wynne.

=== Parkin business route ===
U.S. Highway 64B
- Location: Parkin, Arkansas
- Length: 1.1 mi (1.8 km)
- Existed: 1972–present

U.S. Route 64 Business (US 64B) was established in 1972, it starts from US 64 and goes west into downtown Parkin, ending at Church Street. It does not reconnect to US 64, making it a business spur.

=== Earle business loop ===
U.S. Highway 64B
- Location: Earle, Arkansas
- Length: 2.8 mi (4.5 km)
- Existed: 1972–present

U.S. Route 64 Business (US 64B) was established in 1972, it goes through downtown Earle, via 2nd Street.

=== Crawfordsville business loop ===
U.S. Highway 64B
- Location: Crawfordsville, Arkansas
- Length: 1.3 mi (2.1 km)
- Existed: 1972–present

U.S. Route 64 Business (US 64B) was established in 1972, it goes through downtown Crawfordsville, via Main Street.

== Tennessee ==
=== Whiteville business loop ===
U.S. Route 64 Business
- Location: Whiteville, Tennessee
- Length: 2.1 mi (3.4 km)
- Existed: 1963–present

U.S. Route 64 Business (US 64 Bus.) was established in 1963, it goes through downtown Whiteville, via Main Street.

Major intersections

The entire route is in Whiteville, Hardeman County.

mi	km	Destinations	Notes
0.0	0.0	US 64 (SR 15) – Somerville, Bolivar	Western terminus
0.9	1.4	SR 179 east (S Cross Avenue)	Western end of wrong-way concurrency with SR 179
1.0	1.6	SR 179 west (Oak Street)	Eastern end of wrong-way concurrency with SR 179
2.1	3.4	US 64 (SR 15/SR 100) – Bolivar, Somerville	Eastern terminus
1.000 mi = 1.609 km; 1.000 km = 0.621 mi: Concurrency terminus

=== Selmer business loop ===
U.S. Route 64 Business
- Location: Selmer, Tennessee
- Length: 2.6 mi (4.2 km)

U.S. Route 64 Business (US 64 Bus.) is a former section of US 64 that runs along West Cherry Avenue, Court Avenue and Mulberry Avenue in downtown Selmer, between the two ends of an overlap of US 45 and 64.

Major intersections

The entire route is in Selmer, McNairy County.

mi	km	Destinations	Notes
0.0	0.0	US 45 / US 64 (Marcus J Wright Memorial Highway/W Cherry Avenue/SR 5/SR 15 west) – Bethel Springs, Henderson, Hornsby, Bolivar	Western terminus; interchange; western end of unsigned concurrency with SR 15
1.6	2.6	N Railroad Street To Purdy Road - Purdy	
2.6	4.2	US 45 / US 64 (Mulberry Avenue/Marcus J Wright Memorial Highway/SR 5/SR 15 east) – Eastview, Corinth, MS, Adamsville	Eastern terminus; eastern end of unsigned concurrency SR 15
1.000 mi = 1.609 km; 1.000 km = 0.621 mi: Concurrency terminus

=== Savannah truck route ===
U.S. Route 64 Truck
- Location: Savannah, Tennessee
- Length: 0.6 mi (970 m)

U.S. Route 64 Truck (US 64 Truck), also known as Savannah Truck Route, follows Water Street around downtown Savannah, Tennessee.

=== Lawrenceburg business route ===
U.S. Route 64 Business
- Location: Lawrenceburg, Tennessee
- Length: 9.3 mi (15.0 km)
- Existed: 2014?–present

U.S. Route 64 Business (US 64 Bus.) was established during the mid-2010s as a replacement for mainline US 64's realignment onto the Lawrenceburg Highway. It goes through downtown Lawrenceburg, via West Gaines Street, East Gaines Street and Pulaski Highway.

Major intersections

The entire route is in Lawrenceburg, Lawrence County.

mi	km	Destinations	Notes
0.0	0.0	US 64 (SR 15/Lawrenceburg Highway) – Waynesboro, Pulaski	Western terminus
1.4	2.3	SR 242 south (West Point Drive) – Iron City	West end of SR 242 overlap
2.1	3.4	Davy Crockett Park Road - David Crockett State Park	
2.9	4.7	SR 242 north (Buffalo Avenue)	East end of SR 242 overlap
3.5	5.6	US 43 (SR 6/Locust Avenue) – Mount Pleasant, Ethridge, Loretto, Saint Joseph	
7.4	11.9	Lone Star Road - Lawrenceburg–Lawrence County Airport	
9.3	15.0	US 64 (SR 15/Lawrenceburg Highway) – Pulaski, Waynesboro	Eastern terminus
1.000 mi = 1.609 km; 1.000 km = 0.621 mi: Concurrency terminus

=== Fayetteville bypass ===
U.S. Route 64 Bypass
- Location: Fayetteville, Tennessee

U.S. Route 64 Bypass (US 64 Byp.) runs along the southern side of Fayetteville, Tennessee. The first section is named Wilson Parkway and runs south, then curves to the southeast. After the intersection with Hedgecomb Avenue and River Drive, the road makes a sharp curve to the northeast where it runs along the west bank of the Elk River. At the intersection with US 431, an overlap with US 231 ends as it joins US 64 Bypass onto a new road named Thornton Taylor Parkway. After passing the Lincoln Medical Center, the road curves from the northeast to northwest as US 64 Bypass ends at US 64, while US 231 continues northward along Thornton Taylor Parkway towards Shelbyville Highway.

=== Winchester business route ===
U.S. Route 64 Business
- Location: Winchester, Tennessee
- Length: 1.5 mi (2.4 km)

U.S. Route 64 Business (US 64 Bus.) in Winchester serves as a replacement for the former alignment of US 64 through the southwest side of the town. It terminates at U.S. Route 41A at the Winchester town square. The highway is signed as US 64 Bus. on the route and is concurrent with SR 50 for its entire length, along with the unsigned concurrencies of SR 15 and SR 16.

Major intersections

The entire route is in Winchester, Franklin County.

mi	km	Destinations	Notes
0.0	0.0	US 64 (Veterans Memorial Drive) / SR 16 (Rowe Gap Road/David Crockett Highway/SR 15 east) / SR 50 (George Fraley Parkway) – Winchester, Lynchburg, Hytop, AL	Western terminus; partial interchange with US 64; western end of SR 50 concurrency; western end of unsigned SR 15 and SR 16 concurrencies; southern terminus of unsigned SR 433 (along US 64)
1.4	2.3	SR 130 north (North High Street) – Tullahoma	Eastern terminus of SR 130
1.5	2.4	US 41A (SR 50/SR 16/Dinah Shore Boulevard) / SR 16 (SR 15/South College Street) / SR 50 – Decherd, Cowan	Eastern terminus at Winchester town square; eastern end of SR 50 concurrency; eastern end of unsigned SR 15 and SR 16 concurrencies
1.000 mi = 1.609 km; 1.000 km = 0.621 mi: Concurrency terminus

=== Cleveland bypass ===
U.S. Route 64 Bypass
- Location: Cleveland, Tennessee
- Length: 6.6 mi (10.6 km)
- Existed: 1966–present

U.S. Route 64 Bypass (US 64 Byp.) was constructed as the southeastern part of the Cleveland beltway, known as APD-40. The route is part of Corridor K of the Appalachian Development Highway System.

== North Carolina ==
=== Hayesville business loop ===
U.S. Highway 64 Business
- Location: Hayesville, North Carolina
- Length: 2.0 mi (3.2 km)
- Existed: 1971–present

U.S. Route 64 Business (US 64 Bus) was established in 1971 when mainline US 64 was placed on new bypass south of Hayesville. The business routes follows the old alignment through the downtown area, via Hwy 64 Business, Hiwassee Street and Main Street.

Major intersections

The entire route is in Clay County.

Location	mi	km	Destinations	Notes
	0.0	0.0	US 64 – Murphy, Franklin	
Hayesville	1.7	2.7	NC 69 south – Hiawassee	Roundabout
	2.0	3.2	US 64 – Murphy, Franklin	
1.000 mi = 1.609 km; 1.000 km = 0.621 mi

=== Franklin–Hendersonville truck route ===
U.S. Highway 64 Truck
- Location: Franklin–Hendersonville, NC
- Length: 80.8 mi (130.0 km)

U.S. Route 64 Truck (US 64 Truck) follows US 23 from Franklin to Dillsboro, then east following US 74 to Hendersonville, for a total of 80.8 miles (130.0 km). Signage is not primary, US 64 Truck signs are typically located on the side of major junction changes indicating direction of route. Tractor-trailer trucks are prohibited to use mainline US 64 between Franklin and Brevard.

=== Brevard business loop ===
U.S. Highway 64 Business
- Location: Brevard, North Carolina
- Length: 1.07 mi (1.72 km)
- Existed: 1960–present

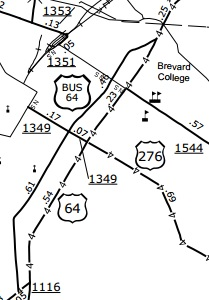
2014 County Map

U.S. Route 64 Business (US 64 Bus.) was established in 1960 as a renumbering of US 64A in downtown Brevard, via Caldwell Street. The 1.07-mile (1.72 km) business loop appears only in NCDOT and AASHTO logs and maps; its actually utilized as westbound US 64 and southbound US 276 (between Main Street and Broad Street). In 2006, NCDOT submitted a request to officially make US 64E and US 64W through downtown Brevard, but was denied in the AASHTO Fall Meeting.

=== Morganton business loop ===
U.S. Highway 64 Business
- Location: Morganton, North Carolina
- Length: 2.8 mi (4.5 km)
- Existed: 1960–present

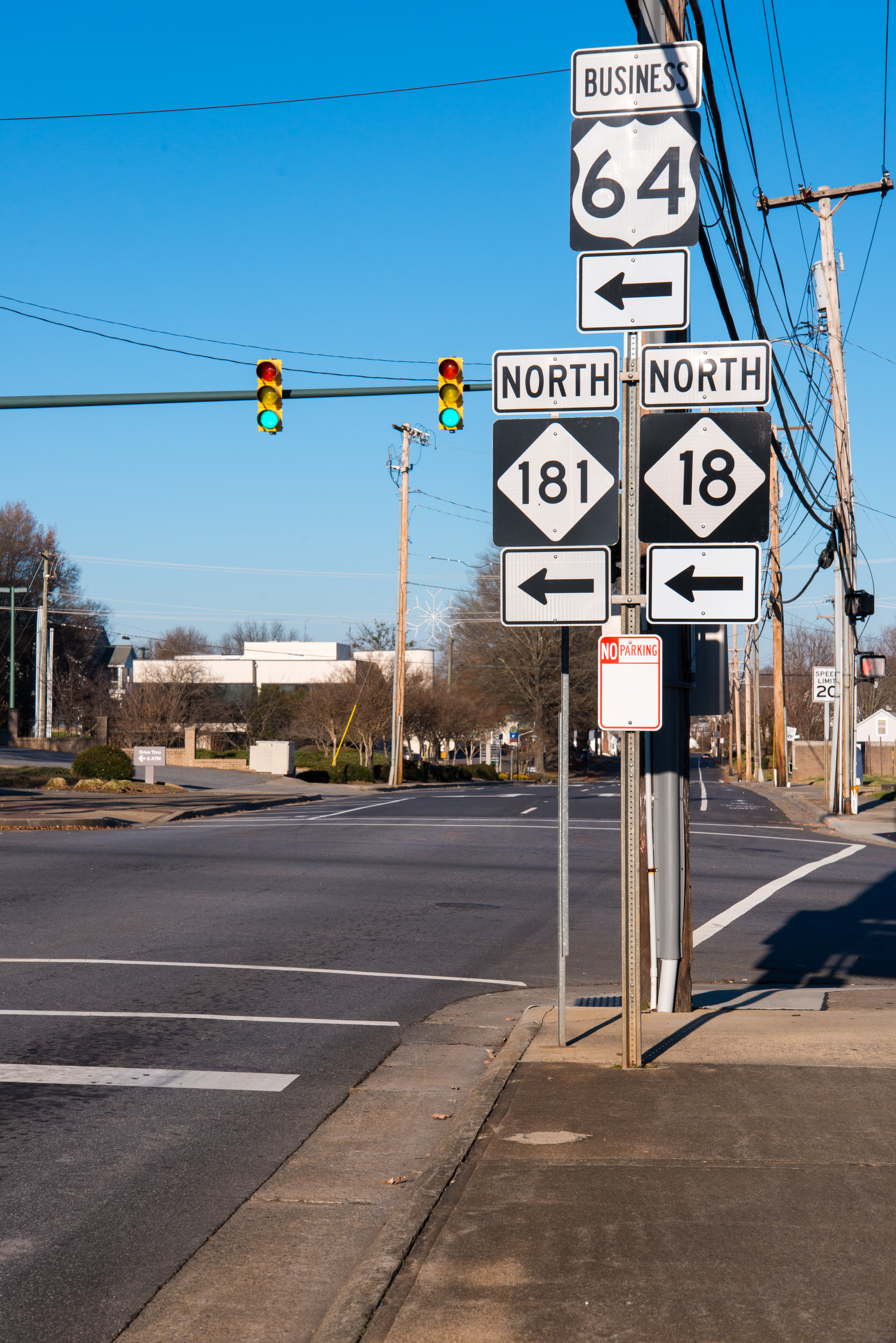
Meeting at Green

U.S. Route 64 Business (US 64 Bus) was established in 1960, which followed the old mainline US 64 routing through downtown Morganton before 1956, via Burkemont Avenue, Union Street and Meeting Street. Between 1969 and 1972, US 64 Bus was split into one-way alignments, eastbound continued on Meeting Street while westbound moved onto Union Street. In 1992, a few years after US 64 was rerouted through Lenoir, US 64 Bus was removed east of Green Street along Meeting and Union Streets to Fleming Drive. Eastbound went north on Green Street to Avery Avenue and westbound went south from Sterling Street to Union Street. Continuing along Avery Avenue and Lenoir Road, it reconnects with mainline US 64, via Sanford Drive. This new alignment adds a short overlap with NC 181 and a long overlap with NC 18; its older section west of Green Street continued to share a short overlap with US 70 Bus.

Major intersections

The entire route is in Morganton, Burke County.

mi	km	Destinations	Notes
0.0	0.0	US 64 (Burkemont Avenue) / US 70 (Flemming Drive)	
0.7	1.1	US 70 Bus. west (Union Street)	West end of US 70 Bus. overlap
1.3	2.1	US 70 Bus. east (Meeting Street) NC 18 south / NC 181 begin (Sterling Street / Green Street)	East end of US 70 Bus. and south end of NC 18 / NC 181 overlap
1.5	2.4	NC 181 north (Green Street)	North end of NC 181 overlap
2.8	4.5	US 64 (Sanford Drive) / NC 18 north (Lenoir Road) – Foothills Regional Airport	North end of NC 18 overlap
1.000 mi = 1.609 km; 1.000 km = 0.621 mi: Concurrency terminus

=== Asheboro business loop ===
U.S. Highway 64 Business
- Location: Asheboro, North Carolina
- Length: 6.3 mi (10.1 km)
- Existed: December 18, 2020–present

U.S. Route 64 Business (US 64 Bus) was established in 2020 when mainline US 64 was placed on a new freeway bypass south of Asheboro. The business route continues along the former mainline alignment through the city limits.

Major intersections

The entire route is in Randolph County.

Location	mi	km	Destinations	Notes
	0.00	0.00	US 64 – Lexington, Raleigh	Interchange; western terminus; US 64 exit 339
Asheboro	2.5	4.0	NC 49 south / Albemarle Road – Charlotte	Interchange via connector roads and entrance ramps; west end of NC 49 overlap
Asheboro	2.8	4.5	I-73 / I-74 / US 220 – Rockingham, Greensboro	Cloverleaf interchange; I-73 exit 72
Asheboro	3.6	5.8	US 220 Bus. (Fayetteville Street)	RIRO interchange
Asheboro	5.4	8.7	NC 42 – Coleridge, Bennett	
	6.3	10.1	US 64 / NC 49 north – Raleigh, Lexington	Interchange; eastern terminus; US 64 exit 352; east end of NC 49 overlap; highway continues as US 64 east/NC 49 north
1.000 mi = 1.609 km; 1.000 km = 0.621 mi: Concurrency terminus

=== Pittsboro business loop ===
U.S. Highway 64 Business
- Location: Pittsboro, North Carolina
- Length: 6.3 mi (10.1 km)
- Existed: 2005–present

U.S. Route 64 Business (US 64 Bus) was established in 2005 when mainline US 64 was placed on new freeway bypass north of Pittsboro. The business route continues along the former mainline alignment through the downtown area, via East and West Streets. At center is the county courthouse, surrounded by a roundabout.

Major intersections

The entire route is in Chatham County.

Location	mi	km	Destinations	Notes
	0.0	0.0	US 64 – Siler City, Raleigh	Exit 378 (US 64)
Pittsboro	2.9	4.7	US 15 / US 501 / NC 87 / NC 902 west – Bear Creek, Graham	
Pittsboro	3.4	5.5	Sanford Road / Hillsboro Street	Roundabout
	6.3	10.1	US 64 – Raleigh, Siler City	Exit 386 (US 64)
1.000 mi = 1.609 km; 1.000 km = 0.621 mi: Concurrency terminus

=== Raleigh–Zebulon business loop ===
U.S. Highway 64 Business
- Location: Raleigh–Zebulon, NC
- Length: 19.2 mi (30.9 km)
- Existed: 1960–present

U.S. Route 64 Business (US 64 Bus) was established in 1960 when mainline US 64 was placed on new bypass route north of Wendell, through Lizard Lick; the 6-mile (9.7 km) business route travels through downtown Wendell along Wendell boulevard, connecting with NC 231 (Selma Road). In 1975, mainline US 64 was placed on new freeway bypass north of Wendell and Zebulon, extending the business route an additional 3 miles (4.8 km), from near Eagle Rock to north of Zebulon (via Gannon and Arendell Avenues); the former bypass through Lizard Lick became NC 97. In 2006, US 64/US 264 was placed on new freeway bypass south of Knightdale; its old alignment becoming another extension of US 64 business, via New Bern Avenue / Knightdale Boulevard and a 1.1-mile (1.8 km) hidden concurrency along the Cliff Benson Beltline.

Major intersections

The entire route is in Wake County.

Location	mi	km	Destinations	Notes
Raleigh	0.0	0.0	I-87 / I-440 east / US 64 / US 264 east – Rocky Mount, Wilson, Greenville	East end of I-440 overlap; exit 14 (I-440)
Raleigh	1.1	1.8	I-440 west – Wake Forest	West end of I-440 overlap; exit 13B (I-440)
Knightdale	5.0	8.0	I-540 – Durham	Exit 24 (I-540)
	10.2	16.4	I-87 / US 64 / US 264 – Raleigh, Wilson, Rocky Mount	Exit 13 (I-87)
Wendell	11.8	19.0	NC 97 east – Zebulon	
Wendell	14.5	23.3	NC 231 north (Selma Road)	
Zebulon	17.9	28.8	NC 97 west (Gannon Avenue) – Raleigh	West end of NC 97 overlap
Zebulon	18.4	29.6	NC 96 south (Arendell Avenue) / NC 97 east (Gannon Avenue) – Selma	South end of NC 96 and east end of NC 97 overlap
Zebulon	19.2	30.9	US 64 / US 264 / NC 96 – Rocky Mount, Raleigh, Oxford	North end of NC 96 overlap; exit 435 (US 64)
1.000 mi = 1.609 km; 1.000 km = 0.621 mi: Concurrency terminus

=== Spring Hope alternate route ===
U.S. Highway 64 Alternate
- Location: Spring Hope, North Carolina
- Length: 11.0 mi (17.7 km)
- Existed: 1979–present

U.S. Route 64 Alternate (US 64 Alt) was established in 1979, replacing the old mainline US 64 through the town of Spring Hope.

Major intersections

The entire route is in Nash County.

Location	mi	km	Destinations	Notes
	0.0	0.0	US 64 / NC 231 south – Rocky Mount, Raleigh, Middlesex	South end of NC 231 overlap
	0.2	0.32	NC 98 west / NC 231 end – Wake Forest	North end of NC 231 overlap
Spring Hope	3.8	6.1	NC 581 south (Walnut Street) – Bailey	South end of NC 581 overlap
Spring Hope	4.4	7.1	NC 581 north (Louisburg Road) – Louisburg, Henderson	North end of NC 581 overlap
Nashville	11.0	17.7	US 64 / US 64 Bus. east – Raleigh, Rocky Mount, Nashville	Exit 458 (US 64)
1.000 mi = 1.609 km; 1.000 km = 0.621 mi: Concurrency terminus

=== Nashville business loop ===
U.S. Highway 64 Business
- Location: Nashville, North Carolina
- Length: 3.5 mi (5.6 km)
- Existed: 1960–present

U.S. Route 64 Business (US 64 Bus) was established in 1963 when mainline US 64 was placed on new freeway bypass route north of Nashville. The business route follows the old alignment through the downtown area via Western Avenue, Barnes Street, Washington Street, and Eastern Avenue.

Major intersections

The entire route is in Nashville, Nash County.

mi	km	Destinations	Notes
0.0	0.0	US 64 / US 64 Alt. west – Rocky Mount, Raleigh, Momeyer	Exit 458 (US 64)
1.5	2.4	NC 58 north (Washington Street) – Castalia	North end of NC 58 overlap
2.0	3.2	NC 58 south (First Street) – Wilson	South end of NC 58 overlap
3.5	5.6	US 64 – Rocky Mount, Raleigh	Exit 461 (US 64)
1.000 mi = 1.609 km; 1.000 km = 0.621 mi: Concurrency terminus

=== Rocky Mount business loop ===
U.S. Highway 64 Business
- Location: Rocky Mount, North Carolina
- Length: 5.3 mi (8.5 km)
- Existed: 1982–present

U.S. Route 64 Business (US 64 Bus.) was established in 1982, it replaced the old mainline US 64 through downtown Rocky Mount, via Sunset Avenue, Thomas Avenue, and Raleigh Street.

=== Rocky Mount–Tarboro alternate route ===
U.S. Highway 64 Alternate
- Location: Rocky Mount–Tarboro, NC
- Length: 14.2 mi (22.9 km)
- Existed: 1987–present

U.S. Route 64 Alternate (US 64 Alt) was established in 1987, replacing the old mainline US 64 between the cities Rocky Mount and Tarboro.

Major intersections

The entire route is in Edgecombe County.

Location	mi	km	Destinations	Notes
Rocky Mount	0.0	0.0	US 64 / US 64 Bus. west / NC 43 north – Raleigh, Tarboro, Rocky Mount	North end of NC 43 overlap; exit 472 (US 64)
Rocky Mount	0.3	0.48	NC 43 south (Springfield Road) – Pinetops, Greenville	South end of NC 43 overlap
Tarboro	11.0	17.7	Main Street – Tarboro	
Tarboro	13.0	20.9	NC 122 south (Howard Avenue)	South end of NC 122 overlap
Tarboro	13.7	22.0	NC 111 south (Wilson Street)	South end of NC 111 overlap
Tarboro	14.2	22.9	US 64 west / US 258 south / NC 111 / NC 122 north – Rocky Mount, Farmville	West end of US 64 and north end of NC 111 and NC 122 overlap; exit 485 (US 64)
1.000 mi = 1.609 km; 1.000 km = 0.621 mi: Concurrency terminus

=== Princeville–Williamston alternate route ===
U.S. Highway 64 Alternate
- Location: Princeville–Williamston, NC
- Length: 31.0 mi (49.9 km)
- Existed: 1996–present

U.S. Route 64 Alternate (US 64 Alt) was established in 1996, replacing the old mainline US 64 between the cities Princeville and Williamston. At some locations it is signed as US 64A.

Major intersections

County	Location	mi	km	Destinations	Notes
Edgecombe	Princeville	0.0	0.0	US 64 east / US 258 / NC 111 / NC 122 south – Williamston	East end of US 64 and south end of US 258 / NC 111 / NC 122 overlap; exit 486 (US 64)
Edgecombe	Princeville	0.4	0.64	US 258 / NC 111 / NC 122 north (Mutual Boulevard) – Scotland Neck NC 33 west (Main Street) – Tarboro	North end of US 258 / NC 111 / NC 122 and west end of NC 33 overlap
Edgecombe	Princeville	1.4	2.3	NC 33 east – Greenville	East end of NC 33 overlap
Edgecombe	Conetoe	7.1	11.4	NC 42 (Church Street) – Conetoe, Hamilton	
Pitt	Bethel	12.3	19.8	US 13 Bus. / NC 11 Bus. (Main Street) – Greenville	
Pitt	Bethel	12.7	20.4	US 13 / NC 11 – Greenville, Williamston	
Martin	Robersonville	19.4	31.2	NC 903 – Stokes, Gold Point	
Martin	Everetts	23.4	37.7	US 13 / US 64 – Williamston, Tarboro	Exit 507 (US 64)
Martin	Williamston	28.8	46.3	NC 125 south	South end of NC 125 overlap
Martin	Williamston	30.2	48.6	US 17 Bus. / NC 125 north – Washington, Downtown	North end of NC 125 overlap
Martin	Williamston	31.0	49.9	US 13 / US 17 / US 64 – Everetts, Tarboro, Windsor	Exit 515 (US 64)
1.000 mi = 1.609 km; 1.000 km = 0.621 mi: Concurrency terminus

=== Jamesville business loop ===
U.S. Highway 64 Business
- Location: Jamesville, North Carolina
- Length: 1.7 mi (2.7 km)
- Existed: 1992–present

U.S. Route 64 Business (US 64 Bus.) was established in 1992, it replaced the old mainline US 64 through downtown Jamesville, via Main Street.

Major intersections

The entire route is in Martin County.

Location	mi	km	Destinations	Notes
Jamesville	0.0	0.0	US 64 – Williamston, Plymouth	Western terminus
Jamesville	1.0	1.6	NC 171 – Jamesville	Northern terminus of NC 171
Jamesville	1.7	2.7	US 64 – Williamston, Plymouth	Eastern terminus
1.000 mi = 1.609 km; 1.000 km = 0.621 mi

=== Columbia business loop ===
U.S. Highway 64 Business
- Location: Columbia, North Carolina
- Length: .5 mi (800 m)
- Existed: 1960–present

U.S. Route 64 Business (US 64 Bus.) was established in 1960, the business loop goes through downtown Columbia, via Broad Street and Main Street.

=== Manns Harbor–Manteo bypass ===
U.S. Highway 64 Bypass
- Location: Manns Harbor–Manteo, NC
- Length: 5.9 mi (9.5 km)
- Existed: 1999–present

U.S. Route 64 Bypass (US 64 Byp.) was established in 1999 as a new primary routing bypassing Manns Harbor and Manteo, while also providing direct access between Nags Head and the mainland. Its main feature is the Virginia Dare Memorial Bridge, which is a divided four-lane bridge crossing over the Croatan Sound. From 1999 to 2003, it also shared a complete concurrency with US 264 Bypass.

Major intersections

The entire route is in Dare County.

Location	mi	km	Destinations	Notes
Manns Harbor	0.0	0.0	US 64 east – Manns Harbor	
Croatan Sound	2.7	4.3	Virginia Dare Memorial Bridge	
Manteo	5.9	9.5	US 64 west / NC 345 south – Manteo, Wanchese	
1.000 mi = 1.609 km; 1.000 km = 0.621 mi

== Former ==
=== Enid business loop ===
U.S. Highway 64 Business
- Location: Enid, Oklahoma
- Length: 4.7 mi (7.6 km)
- Existed: 1967–2009

U.S. Route 64 Business (US 64 Bus) was established in 1967, replacing the old mainline US 64 through downtown Enid, via Rock Island Boulevard, Grand Avenue and Owen K. Garriott Road. The business loop was decommissioned in 2009.

=== Rosman business loop ===
U.S. Highway 64 Business
- Location: Rosman, North Carolina
- Length: 3.5 mi (5.6 km)
- Existed: 1979–1980

U.S. Route 64 Business (US 64 Bus) was established in 1979 when mainline US 64 was placed on new bypass north of Rosman. However, this business loop designation lasted six months before being decommissioned in 1980; reason was because request to AASHTO was denied. The routing followed US 178 into Rosman, then along Old Rosman Highway (SR 1388) to US 64, towards Brevard.

=== Brevard alternate route ===
U.S. Highway 64A
- Location: Brevard, North Carolina
- Length: 1.1 mi (1.8 km)
- Existed: 1943–1960

U.S. Route 64 Alternate (US 64A) was established in 1943, as a new primary routing in downtown Brevard, via Caldwell Street. In 1960 it was renumbered to US 64 Business.

=== Bat Cave–Morganton alternate route ===
U.S. Highway 64A
- Location: Bat Cave–Morganton, NC
- Existed: 1940–1948

U.S. Route 64 Alternate (US 64A) was established in 1934 as an alternate route from Bat Cave, in concurrency with US 74, to Ruth, then north to Morganton, replacing NC 181. In 1948 the route became mainline US 64.

=== Statesville business loop ===
U.S. Highway 64 Business
- Location: Statesville, North Carolina
- Existed: 1960–1963

U.S. Route 64 Business (US 64 Bus) was established in 1960, as a renumbering of US 64A through downtown Statesville. In 1963, mainline US 64 reverted to its original route through Statesville.

=== Statesville alternate route ===
U.S. Highway 64A
- Location: Statesville, North Carolina
- Existed: 1954–1960

U.S. Route 64 Alternate (US 64A) was established in 1954, it replaced the old mainline US 64 through downtown Statesville. In 1960 it was renumbered to US 64 Business.

=== Franklinville–Ramseur alternate route ===
U.S. Highway 64A
- Location: Franklinville–Ramseur, NC
- Existed: 1941–1957

U.S. Route 64 Alternate (US 64A) was established in 1941, it replaced the old mainline US 64 through Franklinville and Ramseur. Around 1957, US 64A was downgraded to Andrew Hunter Road and part of NC 22.

=== Siler City alternate route ===
U.S. Highway 64A
- Location: Siler City, North Carolina
- Existed: 1952–1957

U.S. Route 64 Alternate (US 64A) was established in 1952, it replaced the old mainline US 64 through downtown Siler City, via 3rd Street. By 1957 it was decommissioned.

=== Raleigh business loop ===
U.S. Highway 64 Business
- Location: Raleigh, North Carolina
- Length: 7.9 mi (12.7 km)
- Existed: 1965–1978

U.S. Route 64 Business (US 64 Bus) was established around 1965 when mainline US 64 was placed on new freeway bypassing north of Raleigh. The business route began at the Western Boulevard interchange with US 64/US 1 and proceeded east into the downtown area, where it became Boylan Avenue. At Boylan/South intersection, US 64 turns right onto South Street, while NC 31 continues on along Boylan Avenue to Central Prison. Between Saunders Street and East Street, US 64 splits with westbound on South Street and eastbound on Lenoir Street. Continuing along East Street, it turns right onto New Bern Avenue then meeting back with US 64 at the beltline. In 1971, US 64 was split between East Street and Idlewild Avenue, with westbound on New Bern Avenue and eastbound on Edenton Street. In 1973, the split was extended further west from Idlewild Avenue to the Edenton Street / New Bern Avenue split. In 1978, the business loop was decommissioned with its entire routing becoming secondary roads.

=== Rocky Mount alternate route ===
U.S. Highway 64A
- Location: Rocky Mount, North Carolina
- Existed: 1934–1949

U.S. Route 64 Alternate (US 64A) was established in 1934 as an alternate route in downtown Rocky Mount, via Thomas Avenue; while mainline US 64 used Sunset Avenue, Raleigh Street, and Tarboro Street. It was absorbed by mainline US 64 by 1949.

=== Tarboro–Princeville business loop ===
U.S. Highway 64 Business
- Location: Tarboro–Princeville, NC
- Length: 4.4 mi (7.1 km)
- Existed: 1968–1994

U.S. Route 64 Business (US 64 Bus) was established around 1968 when mainline US 64 was placed on new bypass east of Tarboro and south of Princeville; the business route followed the old alignment through both downtown areas via Main Street. In 1994, US 64 was placed on new freeway south of Tarboro, making the business loop impracticable. Majority of the business route was replaced by NC 33, with only the stretch between Western Boulevard and Northern Boulevard downgraded to secondary road.

=== Williamston business loop ===
U.S. Highway 64 Business
- Location: Williamston, North Carolina
- Length: 2.2 mi (3.5 km)
- Existed: 1960–1977

U.S. Route 64 Business (US 64 Bus) was established in 1960 as a renumbering of US 64A through downtown Williamston, via Main Street, Haughton Street and Jamesville Road. In 1977, it was decommissioned with Main Street and Jamesville Road downgraded to secondary road, while Haughton Street remained part of US 17 Bus.

=== Williamston alternate route ===
U.S. Highway 64A
- Location: Williamston, North Carolina
- Length: 2.2 mi (3.5 km)
- Existed: 1954–1960

U.S. Route 64 Alternate (US 64A) was established in 1954, it replaced the old mainline US 64 through downtown Williamston, via Main Street, Haughton Street and Sycamore Street (now Jamesville Road). In 1960 it was renumbered to US 64 Business.

=== Columbia alternate route ===
U.S. Highway 64A
- Location: Columbia, North Carolina
- Existed: 1954–1960

U.S. Route 64 Alternate (US 64A) was established in 1954, it replaced the old mainline US 64 through downtown Columbia, via Main Street. In 1960 it was renumbered to US 64 Business.

== See also ==
- List of special routes of the United States Numbered Highway System
