= Flintville =

Flintville may refer to:

- Flintville, Tennessee
- Flintville, Wisconsin
