= Tennessee State Route 241 =

State highway in Tennessee, United States

State Route 241
- SR 241 highlighted in red

Route information
- Maintained by TDOT
- Length: 12.0 mi (19.3 km)
- Existed: July 1, 1983–present

Major junctions
- South end: US 64 near Lawrenceburg
- SR 240 near Henryville
- North end: Natchez Trace Parkway in Laurel Hill Wildlife Management Area

Location
- Country: United States
- State: Tennessee
- Counties: Lawrence, Lewis

Highway system
- Tennessee State Routes; Interstate; US; State
← SR 240	→ SR 242

State Route 241 (SR 241) is a 12.0-mile-long (19.3 km) north–south state highway that lies mostly in northwestern Lawrence County, Tennessee, with a small portion extending into southern Lewis County.

== Route description ==
SR 241 begins in Lawrence County as Red Hill-Center Road at an intersection with US 64/SR 15 between Lawrenceburg and Deerfield. It heads northwest through farmland and rural areas to have an intersection and short concurrency with SR 240 before passing along the eastern edge of the Laurel Hill Wildlife Management Area as Napier Road. The highway then enters more wooded areas to cross into Lewis County, where it passes by the Natchez Trace Trading Post and the Natchez Trace RV Campground before taking a turn to the west to enter the Wildlife Management Area shortly before coming to an end at an interchange with the Natchez Trace Parkway, with the road continuing on as Napier Lake Road. The entire route of SR 241 is a two-lane highway.

== Major intersections ==
County	Location	mi	km	Destinations	Notes
Lawrence		0.0	0.0	US 64 (Waynesboro Highway/SR 15) – Waynesboro, Lawrenceburg	Southern terminus
Lawrence				SR 240 north (Turnpike) – Henryville, Summertown	Southern end of wrong-way SR 240 concurrency
Lawrence				SR 240 south (Turnpike)	Northern end of wrong-way SR 240 concurrency
Lewis	Laurel Hill Wildlife Management Area	12.0	19.3	Natchez Trace Parkway	Interchange; northern terminus; road continues north as Napier Lake Road
1.000 mi = 1.609 km; 1.000 km = 0.621 mi: Concurrency terminus
