= Bodiford =

Bodiford is a surname. Notable people with the surname include:

- Ray Bodiford (1936–1989), American insurance agent
- Shaun Bodiford (born 1982), American football player
- William Bodiford (born 1955), American professor and author
