= Dancyville United Methodist Church and Cemetery =

Historic church in Tennessee, United States

- U.S. National Register of Historic Places
- U.S. Historic district
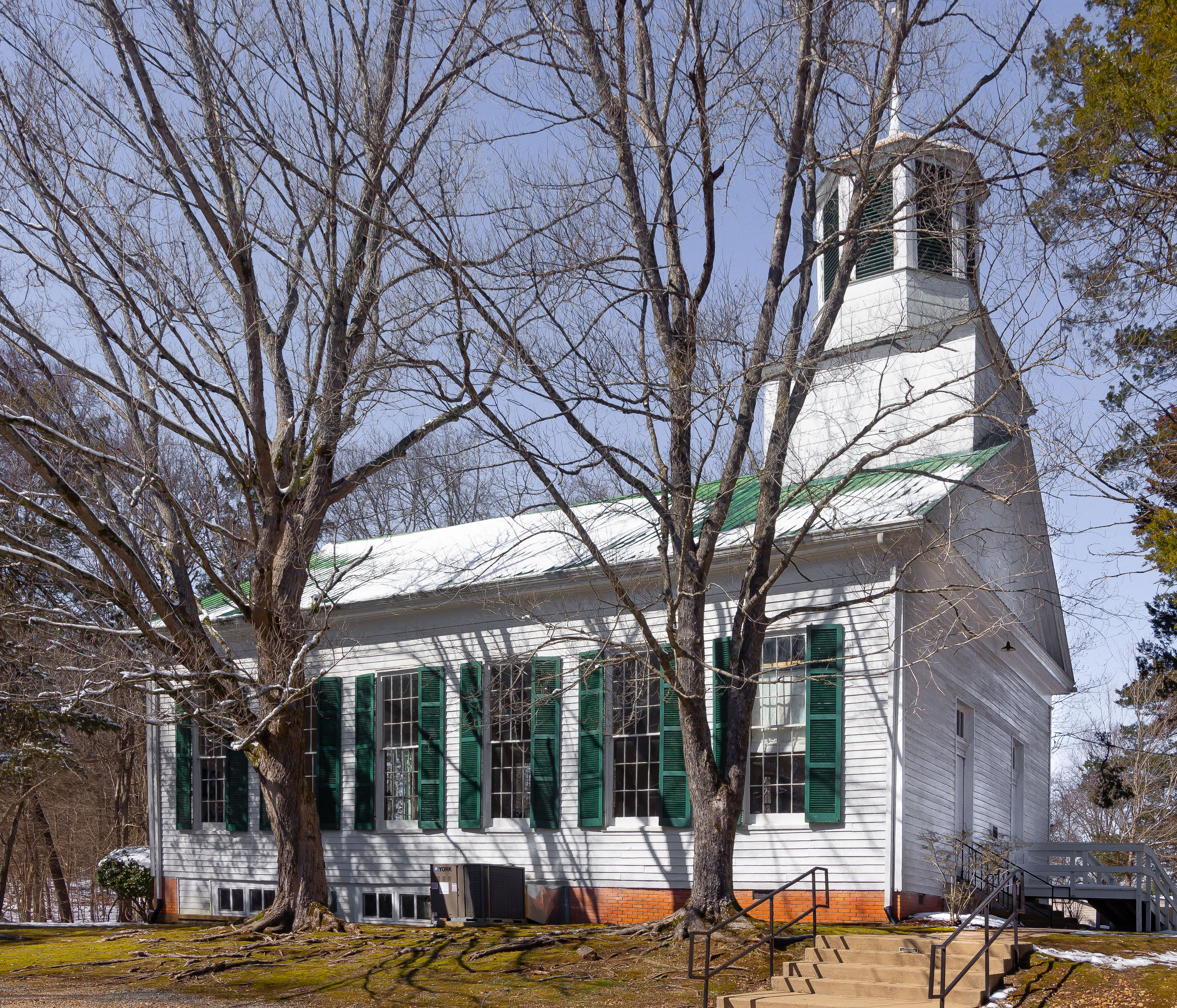

- Location within Tennessee Location within the United States
- Location: Dancyville Methodist Church St., Dancyville, Tennessee
- Coordinates: 35°24′19″N 89°17′43″W
- Area: 3.9 acres (1.6 ha)
- Built: 1850
- Architectural style: Greek Revival
- NRHP reference No.: 91000224
- Added to NRHP: March 13, 1991

Dancyville United Methodist Church is a historic church in the Dancyville community in Haywood County, Tennessee. The church and its cemetery were listed on the National Register of Historic Places in 1991. The church survived as the oldest United Methodist Church in West Tennessee until its closure by the Tennessee-Western Kentucky Annual Conference in May 2023.

The church property was deeded to the Methodist Church on April 1, 1835. Two years later, in 1837, the congregation was organized and a log church building was built on the property. The current building was completed in 1850, replacing the log church. It is a wood frame building in a Greek Revival design, built from trees growing on the church grounds; the lumber was hewn and sawed by hand. In the early 1950s'a basement was built to house a modern kitchen, bathrooms, an assembly room, and Sunday school rooms. The adjoining cemetery dates to 1830. It is one of only a few extant antebellum churches in rural west Tennessee.
