= Tennessee State Route 179 =

State highway in Tennessee, United States

State Route 179
- SR 179 highlighted in red

Route information
- Maintained by TDOT
- Length: 43.4 mi (69.8 km)
- Existed: July 1, 1983–present

Major junctions
- West end: SR 54 near Covington
- US 70 / US 79 in Stanton; I-40 near Dancyville; SR 76 in Dancyville
- East end: US 64 in Whiteville

Location
- Country: United States
- State: Tennessee
- Counties: Tipton, Haywood, Hardeman

Highway system
- Tennessee State Routes; Interstate; US; State
← SR 178	→ SR 180

State Route 179 (SR 179) is a 43.4-mile-long (69.8 km) east–west state highway in West Tennessee, connecting Covington with Whiteville via Stanton and Dancyville.

== Route description ==
SR 179 begins in Tipton County just east of Covington at an intersection with SR 54. It heads southeast through rural areas, where it has an intersection with SR 14, before crossing into Haywood County. The highway then passes through Stanton, where it has an intersection with US 70/US 79/SR 1, as it runs along Covington Street, W Main Street, and S Main Street. SR 179 leaves Stanton and continues east along Stanton Koko Road through rural areas before turning south along Dancyville Road to have an interchange with I-40 (Exit 47). It then enters Dancyville, where it comes to an intersection and becomes concurrent with SR 76. They go north to pass through rural areas to come to the community of Ko Ko, where SR 179 splits off and goes east southeast to cross into Hardeman County. SR 179 then turns south and enters Whiteville along Oak Street. It then has a short concurrency with US 64 Business (US 64 Bus., W Main Street) in downtown before turning south along S Cross Avenue to come to an end at an intersection with US 64/SR 15. The entire route of SR 179 is a two-lane highway.

== Major intersections ==
County	Location	mi	km	Destinations	Notes
Tipton		0.0	0.0	SR 54 – Covington, Brownsville	Western terminus
Tipton				SR 14 (Austin Peay Highway) – Rosemark, Brownsville	
Haywood	Stanton			US 70 / US 79 (SR 1) – Mason, Brownsville	
Haywood				I-40 – Memphis, Nashville	I-40 exit 47
Haywood	Dancyville			SR 76 south – Somerville	Western end of SR 76 concurrency
Haywood	Ko Ko			SR 76 north – Brownsville	Eastern end of SR 76 concurrency
Hardeman	Whiteville			US 64 Bus. east (E Main Street)	Western end of wrong-way US 64 Business concurrency
Hardeman	Whiteville			US 64 Bus. west (W Main Street)	Eastern end of wrong-way US 64 Business concurrency
Hardeman	Whiteville	43.4	69.8	US 64 (SR 100) – Somerville, Bolivar	Eastern terminus
1.000 mi = 1.609 km; 1.000 km = 0.621 mi: Concurrency terminus
