= Bolden Reush Harrison =

American U.S. Navy seaman

Bolden Rush Harrison
- Born: April 26, 1886; Savannah, Tennessee
- Died: January 26, 1952 (aged 65); Savannah, Tennessee
- Burial place: Savannah Cemetery
- Military career
- Allegiance: United States of America
- Branch: United States Navy
- Rank: Coxswain
- Unit: USS Pampanga (PG-39)
- Conflicts: Moro Uprising
- Awards: Medal of Honor

Bolden Reush Harrison (April 26, 1886 – January 26, 1952) was a United States Navy seaman received the Medal of Honor for actions during the Moro Uprising.

He is buried in Savannah Cemetery Savannah, Tennessee.

== Medal of Honor citation ==
Rank and organization: Seaman, U.S. Navy. Born: April 26, 1886, Savannah, Tenn. Accredited to: Tennessee. G.O. No.: 138, December 13, 1911.

Citation:

While attached to the U.S.S. Pampang, Harrison was one of a shore party moving in to capture Mundang, on the island of Basilan, Philippine Islands, on September 24, 1911. Harrison instantly responded to the calls for help when the advance scout party investigating a group of nipa huts close to the trail, was suddenly taken under point-blank fire and rushed by approximately 20 enemy Moros attacking from inside the huts and from other concealed positions. Armed with a double-barreled shotgun, he concentrated his blasting fire on the outlaws, destroying 3 of the Moros and assisting in the rout of the remainder. By his aggressive charging of the enemy under heavy fire and in the face of great odds, Harrison contributed materially to the success of the engagement.

== See also ==
- List of Medal of Honor recipients
