= Granville Hinton =

American politician

Member of the Tennessee House of Representatives from the 31tst district
- In office 1967–1972

Personal details
- Born: February 10, 1929 Savannah, Tennessee, U.S.
- Died: April 27, 1996 (aged 67) Shiloh Falls, Tennessee, U.S.
- Occupation: Insurance agent

Isom Granville Hinton (February 10, 1929 – April 27, 1996) was an insurance agent from Savannah, Tennessee who served as a Republican member of the Tennessee House of Representatives from various districts including Hardin and McNairy counties from 1967 to 1972.

He later served as Tennessee state Commissioner of Conservation under Governor Winfield Dunn, and was the Legislative Liaison (lobbyist) for Governor Lamar Alexander from 1978 to 1986.

== Political career ==
Hinton was elected to the House from the 31st Floterial District in 1966 at the age of 37, and served three terms. During his last term in office, he served as assistant minority floor leader. He was succeeded by fellow Republican (and insurance agent) Ray Bodiford.

Subsequently, he was appointed Commissioner of Conservation by Governor Winfield Dunn, serving from 1973 to 1975.

In December 1978, Governor-elect Lamar Alexander appointed Hinton his legislative liaison (chief lobbyist).

== Personal life ==
Hinton was a State Farm Insurance insurance agent for 40 years. He was a Methodist and a Mason. The Savannah-Hardin Center of Jackson State Community College offers a small "Granville Hinton Memorial Scholarship Award" to a Hardin County resident who takes most of their classes at the Center.

Hinton appeared on the June 17, 1963 episode of the CBS gameshow To Tell the Truth, as an imposter for advice columnist Kurt Lassen. He received one of four possible votes from the show's panelists.

He died of cancer on April 27, 1996, aged 67.
