= Herman L. Wolfe Sr. =

American businessman and politician

Member of the Tennessee House of Representatives
- In office January 11, 1977 – February 2, 1989
- Preceded by: Ray Bodiford
- Succeeded by: Robbie Wolfe
- Constituency: 70th district (1977-1983); 71st district (1983-1991)

Personal details
- Born: September 30, 1930
- Died: February 3, 1989 (aged 58)
- Party: Republican
- Website: House website

Herman L. Wolfe Sr. (September 30, 1930 – February 3, 1989) was a businessman from Savannah, Tennessee, who served seven terms as a Republican member of the Tennessee House of Representatives from 1977 to 1989 (90th through 96th General Assemblies) from a district which encompassed Hardin and McNairy counties.

== Legislative service ==
Wolfe first entered the House in 1977, succeeding fellow Republican Ray Bodiford in the 70th House district, which also included portions of Chester and Hardeman counties; and was assigned to the standing committees on agriculture, and on conservation and the environment. When he died in 1989, his district (now number the 71st) had changed to encompass only Hardin and McNairy counties; he was still on Conservation and Environment, but was also on the committee on general welfare. He died in office on February 3, 1989. Robbie Wolfe succeeded him in office.

== Personal life ==
Wolfe was married to Naomi Luretta Beam Duplessie, who left Savannah in 1973 and later remarried. He was a Baptist lay minister from 1953 till his death. He pastored at Hopewell Baptist Church and Temple Baptist Church in Savannah and Leatherwood Baptist Church in Wayne County.

He had two sons by Naomi, Herman L. Wolfe, Jr. and Donald Wayne Wolfe.

Wolfe held U.S. Patent #D257,923, application date July 25, 1979, issued January 20 1981, for a "Wall mounted support rack for baseball equipment".
