= Dancyville, Tennessee =

Unincorporated community in Tennessee, US

- Unincorporated community Census-designated place
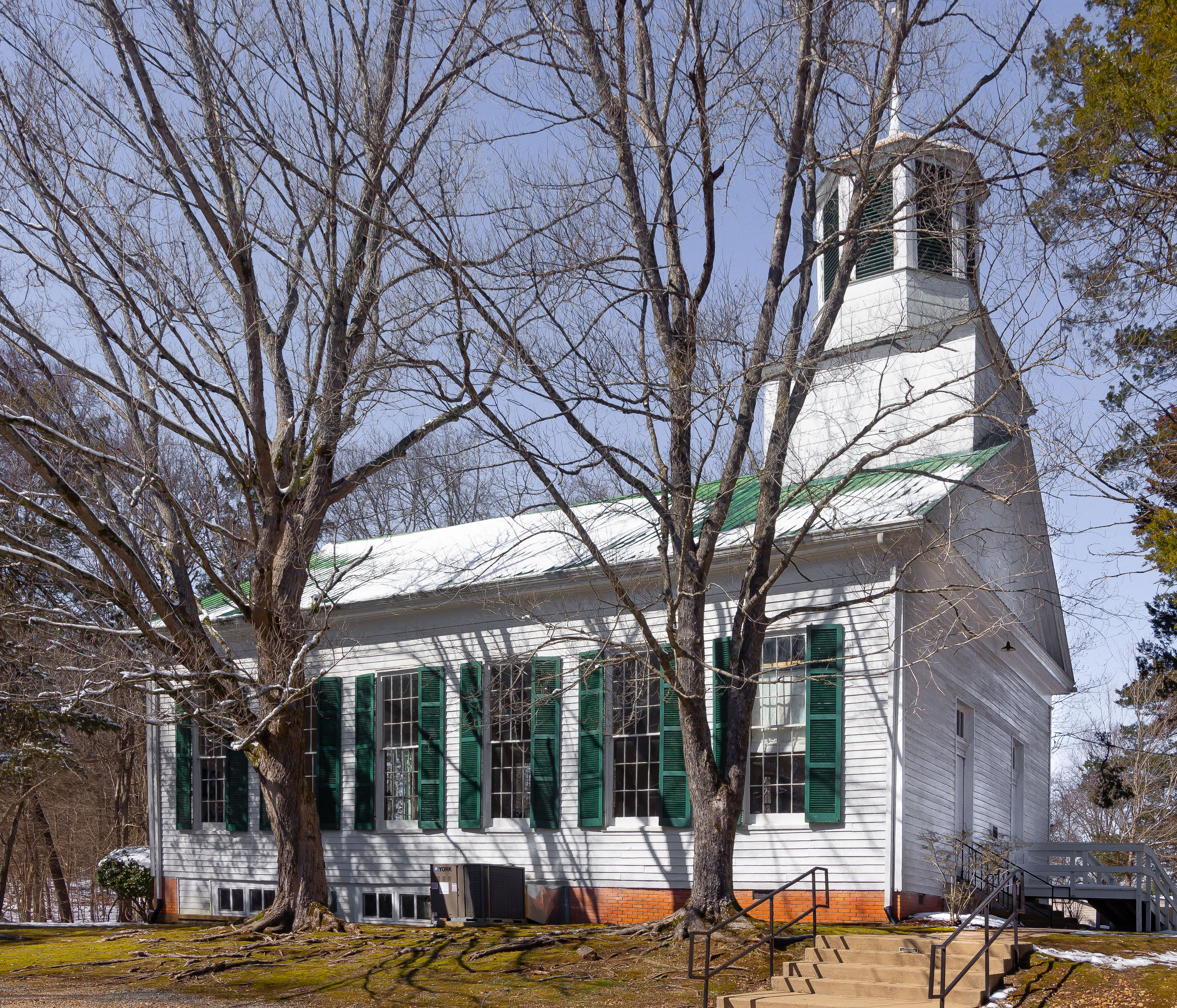
- Dancyville United Methodist Church

- Location within Tennessee Location within the United States
- Country: United States
- State: Tennessee
- County: Haywood

Population (2020)
  - Total: 85
- Time zone: UTC-6 (Central (CST))
  - Summer (DST): UTC-5 (CDT)

Dancyville is an unincorporated community and census-designated place (CDP) in Haywood County, Tennessee, United States. Dancyville is located at latitude 35.408 and longitude -89.294, at the intersection of Tennessee State Route 76 and Tennessee State Route 179, near Interstate 40. The elevation is 404 feet. Dancyville appears on the Dancyville U.S. Geological Survey Map. Haywood County is in the Central Time Zone, and it observes daylight saving time.

The community was properly established in 1837 by merchants Fennell T. Carpenter and John Sutherland. The community was named after local blacksmith Isaac Dancy, who arrived in the area in 1831. The first settlers arrived in the 1820s. The first mention formal of the name Dancyville is found in the court minutes of March 1838, regarding a committee being formed to observe and work out a road from the Fayette County line through Dancyville to Brownsville. In 1854 residents petitioned for incorporation but this charter was later dissolved. During the Civil War, two companies of soldiers were formed in Dancyville, namely the Dancyvillle Grays and Company L of the 9th Tennessee Infantry Division.

The early settlers founded numerous churches in the community, notably the Dancyville United Methodist Church in 1837, a Baptist church in 1838 which no longer survives, and a Presbyterian church in 1853. In more recent times, the Dancyville Assembly of God has been formed.

The community has also been host to numerous educational institutions. In 1849 the Dancyville Female Academy was organized and began meeting in the local Masonic Lodge. A building was erected and dedicated to the Academy in 1851. Also in 1851, the Dancyville Male Academy was organized. These two institutions were later merged into the Dancyville Male and Female Academy. In 1855 the Baptist Female College was organized. In 1884, the Methodist Brownsville District High School was formed in Dancyville.

== Demographics ==
Historical population
| Census | Pop. | Note | %± |
|---|---|---|---|
| 2020 | 85 | | — |
U.S. Decennial Census; 2020

Dancyville first appeared as a census designated place in the 2020 U.S. census.

=== 2020 census ===
Dancyville CDP, Tennessee – Racial and ethnic composition Note: the US Census treats Hispanic/Latino as an ethnic category. This table excludes Latinos from the racial categories and assigns them to a separate category. Hispanics/Latinos may be of any race.
| Race / Ethnicity (NH = Non-Hispanic) | Pop 2020 | % 2020 |
|---|---|---|
| White alone (NH) | 65 | 76.47% |
| Black or African American alone (NH) | 14 | 16.47% |
| Native American or Alaska Native alone (NH) | 0 | 0.00% |
| Asian alone (NH) | 0 | 0.00% |
| Pacific Islander alone (NH) | 0 | 0.00% |
| Some Other Race alone (NH) | 0 | 0.00% |
| Mixed Race or Multi-Racial (NH) | 2 | 2.35% |
| Hispanic or Latino (any race) | 4 | 4.71% |
| Total | 85 | 100.00% |
