= Park City, Tennessee =

- Census-designated place
- Location in Lincoln County and the state of Tennessee.
- Coordinates: 35°04′55″N 86°34′16″W
- Country: United States
- State: Tennessee
- County: Lincoln

Area
  - Total: 5.48 sq mi (14.20 km^{2})
  - Land: 5.46 sq mi (14.15 km^{2})
  - Water: 0.019 sq mi (0.05 km^{2})
- Elevation: 1,001 ft (305 m)

Population (2020)
  - Total: 2,422
  - Density: 443.3/sq mi (171.14/km^{2})
- Time zone: UTC-6 (Central (CST))
  - Summer (DST): UTC-5 (CDT)
- ZIP code: 37334
- Area code: 931
- GNIS feature ID: 1310354

Park City is a census-designated place (CDP) in Lincoln County, Tennessee, United States. As of the 2010 census, its population was 2,442 and 2,422 at the 2020 census.

Park City is the location of the Fayetteville Municipal Airport.

== Geography ==
Park City is located south of Fayetteville, Tennessee and north of Hazel Green, Alabama along U.S. Route 231/U.S. Route 431 (unsigned State Route 10). State Route 275 also passes along the southern edge of Park City, connecting it with Flintville, Tennessee.

== Demographics ==
Historical population
Census	Pop.	Note	%±
2020	2,422		—
U.S. Decennial Census
