= Tennessee State Route 275 =

State highway in Tennessee, United States

State Route 275
- SR 275 highlighted in red

Route information
- Maintained by TDOT
- Length: 14.1 mi (22.7 km)
- Existed: July 1, 1983–present

Major junctions
- West end: US 231 / US 431 in Park City
- East end: US 64 near Flintville

Location
- Country: United States
- State: Tennessee
- Counties: Lincoln

Highway system
- Tennessee State Routes; Interstate; US; State
← I-275	→ SR 276

State Route 275 (SR 275) is a 14.1-mile-long (22.7 km) east–west state highway in eastern Lincoln County, Tennessee, connecting Park City with Flintville via Lincoln and Vanntown. Despite its east–west designation, it runs almost entirely north–south between Vanntown and US 64.

== Route description ==
SR 275 begins in Park City at an intersection with US 231/US 431 (SR 10). It heads east as Lincoln Road through farmland and rural areas to pass through the community of Lincoln. The highway then becomes Vanntown Road as it crosses a bridge over the Flint River and continue east through rural areas to the Vanntown community, where it turns north along N Vanntown School Road. SR 275 leaves Vanntown and turns northeast along Oliver Smith Road to cross over the Flint River again to pass through the community of Flintville. It turns north again along Flintville Road to pass through rural areas before coming to an end at an intersection with US 64 (SR 15). The entire route of SR 275 is a two-lane highway.

== Major intersections ==
The entire route is in Lincoln County.

Location	mi	km	Destinations	Notes
Park City	0.0	0.0	US 231 / US 431 (Huntsville Highway/SR 10) – Huntsville, AL, Fayetteville	Western terminus
Lincoln	4.5	7.2	Bridge over the Flint River	
	9.7	15.6	Bridge over the Flint River	
	14.1	22.7	US 64 (Winchester Highway/SR 15) – Fayetteville, Huntland, Winchester	Eastern terminus
1.000 mi = 1.609 km; 1.000 km = 0.621 mi
