= Tennessee State Route 240 =

State highway in Tennessee, United States

State Route 240
- Turnpike
- SR 240 highlighted in red

Route information
- Maintained by TDOT
- Length: 17.2 mi (27.7 km)
- Existed: July 1, 1983–present

Major junctions
- South end: US 64 near Deerfield
- SR 241 near Henryville; SR 242 in Henryville; SR 20 in Summertown
- North end: US 43 in Summertown

Location
- Country: United States
- State: Tennessee
- Counties: Lawrence

Highway system
- Tennessee State Routes; Interstate; US; State
← I-240	→ SR 241

State Route 240 (SR 240) is a 17.2-mile-long (27.7 km) north–south state highway in Lawrence County, Tennessee. Except for a short stretch in Summertown, the entire route of SR 240 is known simply as Turnpike.

== Route description ==
SR 240 begins as Turnpike just west of Deerfield at an intersection with US 64/SR 15. It goes northeast along the southern edge of Laurel Hill Wildlife Management Area to pass through farmland and have a short concurrency with SR 241 before passing through Henryville, where it has an intersection with SR 242. The highway then crosses the Buffalo River passes through a mix of farmland and wooded areas before entering Summertown, where it turns east to have a concurrency with SR 20 before turning south along Monument road and coming to an end at an intersection with US 43/SR 6. The entire route of SR 240 is a two-lane highway.

== Major intersections ==
The entire route is in Lawrence County.

Location	mi	km	Destinations	Notes
	0.0	0.0	US 64 (Waynesboro Highway/SR 15) – Waynesboro, Lawrenceburg	Southern terminus
			SR 241 north (Napier Road)	Southern end of wrong-way SR 241 concurrency
			SR 241 south (Red Hill-Center Road) – Deerfield	Northern end of wrong-way SR 241 concurrency
Henryville			SR 242 south (Henryville Road) – Lawrenceburg	Northern terminus of SR 242
Henryville			Bridge over the Buffalo River	
Summertown			SR 20 west – Hohenwald	Southern end of SR 20 concurrency
Summertown			SR 20 east	Northern end of SR 20 concurrency
Summertown	17.2	27.7	US 43 (Andrew Jackson Highway/SR 6) – Lawrenceburg, Ethridge, Mount Pleasant, Columbia	Northern terminus
1.000 mi = 1.609 km; 1.000 km = 0.621 mi: Concurrency terminus
