= Nixon, Tennessee =

- Unincorporated community
- Location within Tennessee Location within the United States
- Coordinates: 35°06′53″N 88°15′24″W
- Country: United States
- State: Tennessee
- County: Hardin

Area
  - Total: 1.76 sq mi (4.57 km^{2})
  - Land: 1.76 sq mi (4.57 km^{2})
  - Water: 0 sq mi (0.00 km^{2})
- Elevation: 499 ft (152 m)

Population (2020)
  - Total: 514
  - Density: 291.2/sq mi (112.45/km^{2})
- Time zone: UTC-6 (Central (CST))
  - Summer (DST): UTC-5 (CDT)
- ZIP code: 38372
- Area code: 731
- GNIS feature ID: 1295773

Nixon is an unincorporated community in Hardin County, Tennessee. Nixon is located on Tennessee State Route 128, north of the Tennessee River's Pickwick Landing Dam.

== Demographics ==
Historical population
Census	Pop.	Note	%±
2020	514		—
U.S. Decennial Census
