= Walkertown, Tennessee =

- Unincorporated community
- Location within Tennessee Location within the United States
- Coordinates: 35°11′07″N 88°14′36″W
- Country: United States
- State: Tennessee
- County: Hardin
- Elevation: 472 ft (144 m)
- Time zone: UTC-6 (Central (CST))
  - Summer (DST): UTC-5 (CDT)
- Area code: 731
- GNIS feature ID: 1273652

Walkertown is an unincorporated community in Hardin County, Tennessee. Walkertown is located immediately south of Savannah and is served by Tennessee State Route 128 and Tennessee State Route 69. Walkertown was founded by James Walker Haynes in 1826. Known descendants of James Walker Haynes are James Walker Haynes, Jr. and his son Jacob Walker Haynes. James Walker Haynes, Jr. lives in Savannah, TN and Jacob Walker Haynes currently lives in Chattanooga, TN.
