= Fayetteville Municipal Airport (Tennessee) =

- IATA: FYM; ICAO: KFYM; FAA LID: FYM

Summary
- Airport type: Public
- Owner: Fayetteville-Lincoln Airport Authority
- Serves: Fayetteville, Tennessee
- Location: Park City, Lincoln County, Tennessee
- Elevation AMSL: 984 ft (300 m)
- Coordinates: 35°03′35″N 086°33′50″W

Map
- Location of airport in Tennessee FYM (the United States)

Runways
Direction	Length		Surface
Direction	ft	m	Surface
2/20	5,900	1,798	Asphalt

Statistics (2009)
- Aircraft operations: 14,444
- Based aircraft: 25
- Source: Federal Aviation Administration

Fayetteville Municipal Airport (IATA: FYM, ICAO: KFYM, FAA LID: FYM) is a public use airport located six nautical miles (7 mi, 11 km) south of the central business district of Fayetteville, a city in Lincoln County, Tennessee, United States, in the community of Park City. It is owned by the Fayetteville-Lincoln Airport Authority. It is included in the National Plan of Integrated Airport Systems for 2011–2015, which categorized it as a general aviation airport.

== Facilities and aircraft ==
Fayetteville Municipal Airport covers an area of 113 acres (46 ha) at an elevation of 984 feet (300 m) above mean sea level. It has one runway designated 2/20 with an asphalt surface measuring 5,900 by 100 feet (1,798 x 30 m).

For the 12-month period ending June 3, 2009, the airport had 14,444 aircraft operations, an average of 39 per day: 97% general aviation, 2% air taxi, and 1% military. At that time there were 25 aircraft based at this airport: 72% single-engine, 24% multi-engine, and 4% jet.

== See also ==
- List of airports in Tennessee
