= Winchester Municipal Airport =

- IATA: none; ICAO: KBGF; FAA LID: BGF

Summary
- Airport type: Public
- Owner: City of Winchester
- Serves: Winchester, Tennessee
- Elevation AMSL: 979 ft / 298 m
- Coordinates: 35°10′39″N 086°03′58″W
- Website: winchester-airport.com

Map
- Location of airport in Tennessee KBGF (the United States)

Runways
Direction	Length		Surface
Direction	ft	m	Surface
18/36	5,002	1,525	Asphalt

Statistics (2022)
- Aircraft operations: 13,000
- Based aircraft: 21
- Source: Federal Aviation Administration

Winchester Municipal Airport (ICAO: KBGF, FAA LID: BGF) is a city-owned public-use airport located three nautical miles (6 km) southeast of the central business district of Winchester, a city in Franklin County, Tennessee, United States.

Although most U.S. airports use the same three-letter location identifier for the FAA and IATA, this airport is assigned BGF by the FAA but has no designation from the IATA (which assigned BGF to Bangui M'Poko International Airport in Bangui, Central African Republic).

== Facilities and aircraft ==
Winchester Municipal Airport covers an area of 134 acres (54 ha) at an elevation of 979 feet (298 m) above mean sea level. It has one asphalt paved runway designated 18/36 which measures 5,002 by 75 feet (1,525 x 23 m).

For the 12-month period ending June 30, 2022, the airport had 13,000 aircraft operations, an average of 14 per day: 92% general aviation, 6% air taxi and 2% military. At that time there were 21 aircraft based at this airport: 17 single-engine, 3 multi-engine, 1 helicopter and 0 jet.

== Accidents and incidents ==
- On February 7, 2021, a Cessna 441 Conquest II (2), registration N44776, crashed while approaching Winchester Municipal Airport, killing both people on board, the pilot and passenger. The cause is still under investigation.

== See also ==
- List of airports in Tennessee
