= Ray Bodiford =

American politician (1936–1989)

Member of the Tennessee House of Representatives from the 70th district
- In office 1973–1976
- Preceded by: Granville Hinton
- Succeeded by: Herman L. Wolfe Sr.

Personal details
- Born: Johnny Ray Bodiford; June 14, 1936
- Died: July 12, 1989 (aged 53)
- Party: Republican
- Spouse: Bernice Nixon Bodiford
- Profession: Politician, insurance agent

Johnny Ray Bodiford (June 14, 1936 – July 12, 1989) was an American insurance agent from Selmer, Tennessee who served as a Republican member of the Tennessee House of Representatives from the 70th district (Hardin and McNairy counties and parts of Wayne, Chester and Hardeman counties) from 1973 to 1976. He succeeded fellow Republican (and insurance agent) Granville Hinton, and was succeeded by Republican Herman L. Wolfe Sr.

He was a member of the Tennessee 1977 Limited Constitutional Convention.

In 1980, he ran what was described as a "strong campaign" for the state senate against longtime incumbent senator and Lieutenant Governor John S. Wilder, but was unable to defeat him.

== Personal life ==
He was married to Bernice Nixon Bodiford, who is listed as his widow in her March 2005 obituary. He was a member of the Churches of Christ, and a Freemason.
