= Henryville, Tennessee =

- Unincorporated community
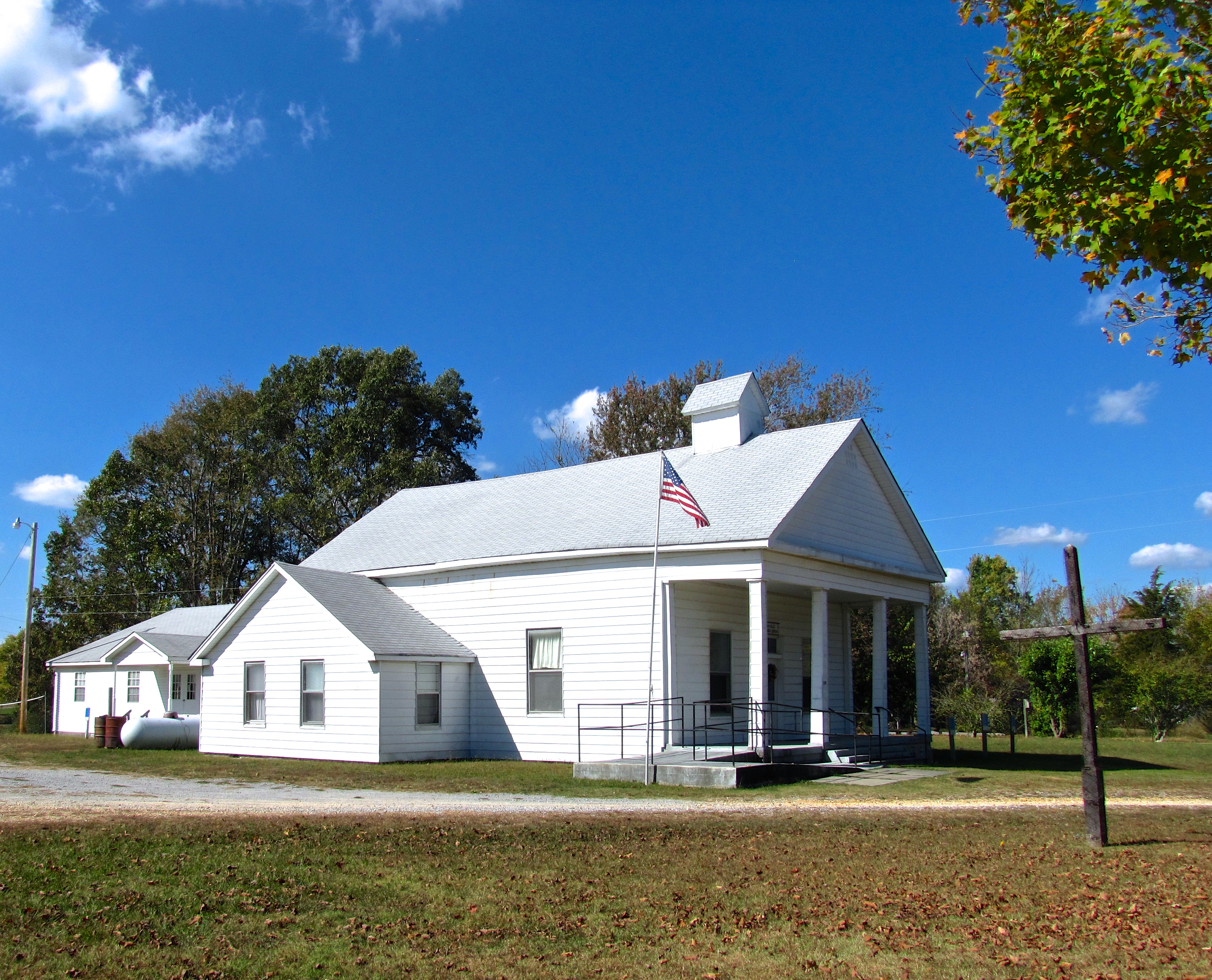
- Henryville Methodist Church

- Location within Tennessee Location within the United States
- Coordinates: 35°23′31″N 87°23′39″W
- Country: United States
- State: Tennessee
- County: Lawrence
- Elevation: 886 ft (270 m)
- Time zone: UTC-6 (Central (CST))
  - Summer (DST): UTC-5 (CDT)
- ZIP code: 38483, 38464, 38456
- Area code: 931
- GNIS feature ID: 1287453

Henryville is an unincorporated community in Lawrence County, Tennessee, United States. It lies along State Route 240 at its junction with State Route 242, southwest of Summertown, northwest of Lawrenceburg, and just south of the Buffalo River. The community was first settled around 1815, and was named after its first postmaster when a local post office was established in 1847.

Henryville is home to several churches, a community center, a convenience store, and a volunteer fire department.
