= Olivet, Tennessee =

Census-designated place and unincorporated community in Tennessee, United States

- Census-designated place and unincorporated community.
- Location within Tennessee Location within the United States
- Coordinates: 35°12′51″N 88°12′01″W
- Country: United States
- State: Tennessee
- County: Hardin

Area
  - Total: 5.97 sq mi (15.45 km^{2})
  - Land: 5.97 sq mi (15.45 km^{2})
  - Water: 0 sq mi (0.00 km^{2})
- Elevation: 463 ft (141 m)

Population (2020)
  - Total: 1,441
  - Density: 241.6/sq mi (93.27/km^{2})
- Time zone: UTC-6 (Central (CST))
  - Summer (DST): UTC-5 (CDT)
- ZIP code: 38372
- Area code: 731
- GNIS feature ID: 1296426

Olivet is a census-designated place and an unincorporated community in Hardin County, Tennessee, that is treated as a census-designated place (CDP) for the 2010 U.S. census. Olivet is located immediately east of Savannah and is served by Tennessee State Route 203 and Tennessee State Route 226.

The population of the CDP was 1,401 as of the 2020 census.

The community was named after the Mount of Olives.

== Demographics ==
Historical population
Census	Pop.	Note	%±
2020	1,441		—
U.S. Decennial Census

As of the 2020 census, there were 1,441 people, 624 housing units, and 513 families in the CDP. The racial makeup was 92.3% White, 2.2% African American, 0.7% Native American, 0.7% Asian, 0.9% from some other race, and 2.9% from two or more races.

The ancestry was 14.4% English, 10.6% German, 5.1% Irish, and 3.0% Welsh.

The median age was 45.1 years old. 18.6% of the population was 65 or older, with 14.8% between the ages of 65 and 74, and 3.7% was 75 or older. 17.7% of the population were under 18, with 6.0% under 5, and 11.6% was 5 or older.

The median household income was $65,739. 5.4% of the population was in poverty, with 7.0% of people under 18, 4.6% of people between 18 and 64, and 6.3% of people over 65 were in poverty.
