= Walnut Grove, Hardin County, Tennessee =

- Census-designated place
- Location within Tennessee Location within the United States
- Coordinates: 35°02′24″N 88°03′04″W
- Country: United States
- State: Tennessee
- County: Hardin

Area
  - Total: 5.756 sq mi (14.91 km^{2})
  - Land: 5.756 sq mi (14.91 km^{2})
  - Water: 0 sq mi (0 km^{2})
- Elevation: 764 ft (233 m)

Population (2020)
  - Total: 359
  - Density: 62.4/sq mi (24.1/km^{2})
- Time zone: UTC-6 (Central (CST))
  - Summer (DST): UTC-5 (CDT)
- Area code: 731
- GNIS feature ID: 1304349

Walnut Grove is an unincorporated community and census-designated place (CDP) in Hardin County, Tennessee. Walnut Grove is located on Tennessee State Route 69, north of the Alabama border. As of the 2020 census, its population was 359, down from 396 at 2010.
