= Shoal Creek (Tennessee River tributary) =

Shoal Creek/Sycamore River
- Native name: Sycamore River (English)

Location
- Country: United States
- State: Tennessee, Alabama
- Region: Lawrence County, Wayne County, Lauderdale County

Physical characteristics
- Source
  - location: Lawrence County, Tennessee, United States
  - coordinates: 35°13′06″N 087°17′59″W
- Mouth: Wilson Lake
  - location: near Killen in Lauderdale County, Alabama, United States
  - coordinates: 34°50′17″N 087°33′12″W

Shoal Creek (originally called the Sycamore River) is a 64.7-mile-long (104.1 km) river from its east point or 63.6-mile-long (102.4 km) from the north point on the Little Shoal Creek north of Lawrenceburg, Tennessee. The stream rises in northern Lawrence County, Tennessee, and enters the Tennessee River in Lauderdale County, Alabama, where its lower reaches are impounded in the backwater of Wilson Dam.

Historically, Shoal Creek (Sycamore River) was an important source of water power for the cotton industry in Lawrence County. Among the early users of the stream's water power was David Crockett, who settled near the creek bank in 1817 and started a powder mill, grist mill and distillery. After these operations were destroyed by a flood in September 1821, Crockett left the area and moved to West Tennessee. The Crockett-Shoals region of Tennessee, including Lawrence County and surrounding areas, is named for Shoal Creek and this famous frontiersman who played an active role in establishing Lawrence County and Lawrenceburg. This history is commemorated by David Crockett State Park.

On July 13, 1998, flash flooding on Shoal Creek caused two deaths and led to the temporary loss of water supply and sewage treatment in Lawrenceburg. The flooding occurred after about 9 inches (230 mm) of rain fell in just four hours, resulting in what was estimated to be a 100-year flood.

== See also ==
- List of rivers of Alabama
- List of rivers of Tennessee
