= Maddox, Tennessee =

- Unincorporated community
- Location within Tennessee Location within the United States
- Coordinates: 35°09′39″N 88°13′08″W
- Country: United States
- State: Tennessee
- County: Hardin
- Elevation: 476 ft (145 m)
- Time zone: UTC-6 (Central (CST))
  - Summer (DST): UTC-5 (CDT)
- Area code: 731
- GNIS feature ID: 1292470

Maddox is an unincorporated community in Hardin County, Tennessee. Maddox is located at the intersection of Tennessee State Route 69 and Tennessee State Route 226, south of Savannah.
