= Lawrenceburg–Lawrence County Airport =

- IATA: none; ICAO: none; FAA LID: 2M2

Summary
- Airport type: Public
- Owner: City of Lawrenceburg
- Serves: Lawrenceburg, Tennessee
- Elevation AMSL: 936 ft / 285 m
- Coordinates: 35°14′04″N 087°15′29″W
- Website: Tennessee2M2.com

Map
- Location of airport in Tennessee 2M2 (the United States)

Runways
Direction	Length		Surface
Direction	ft	m	Surface
17/35	5,003	1,525	Asphalt

Statistics (2011)
- Aircraft operations: 3,638
- Based aircraft: 18
- Source: Federal Aviation Administration

Lawrenceburg–Lawrence County Airport (FAA LID: 2M2) is a public use airport located three nautical miles (6 km) northeast of the central business district of Lawrenceburg, a city in Lawrence County, Tennessee, United States. It is owned by the City of Lawrenceburg. This airport is included in the National Plan of Integrated Airport Systems for 2011–2015, which categorized it as a general aviation facility.

== Facilities and aircraft ==
Lawrenceburg–Lawrence County Airport covers an area of 131 acres (53 ha) at an elevation of 936 feet (285 m) above mean sea level. It has one runway designated 17/35 with an asphalt surface measuring 5,003 by 100 feet (1,525 x 30 m).

For the 12-month period ending April 30, 2011, the airport had 3,638 general aviation aircraft operations, an average of 303 per month. At that time there were 18 aircraft based at this airport: 89% single-engine and 11% multi-engine.

== See also ==
- List of airports in Tennessee
