= David Crockett State Park =

State park in Tennessee, United States

Coordinates: 35.263°N 87.362°W

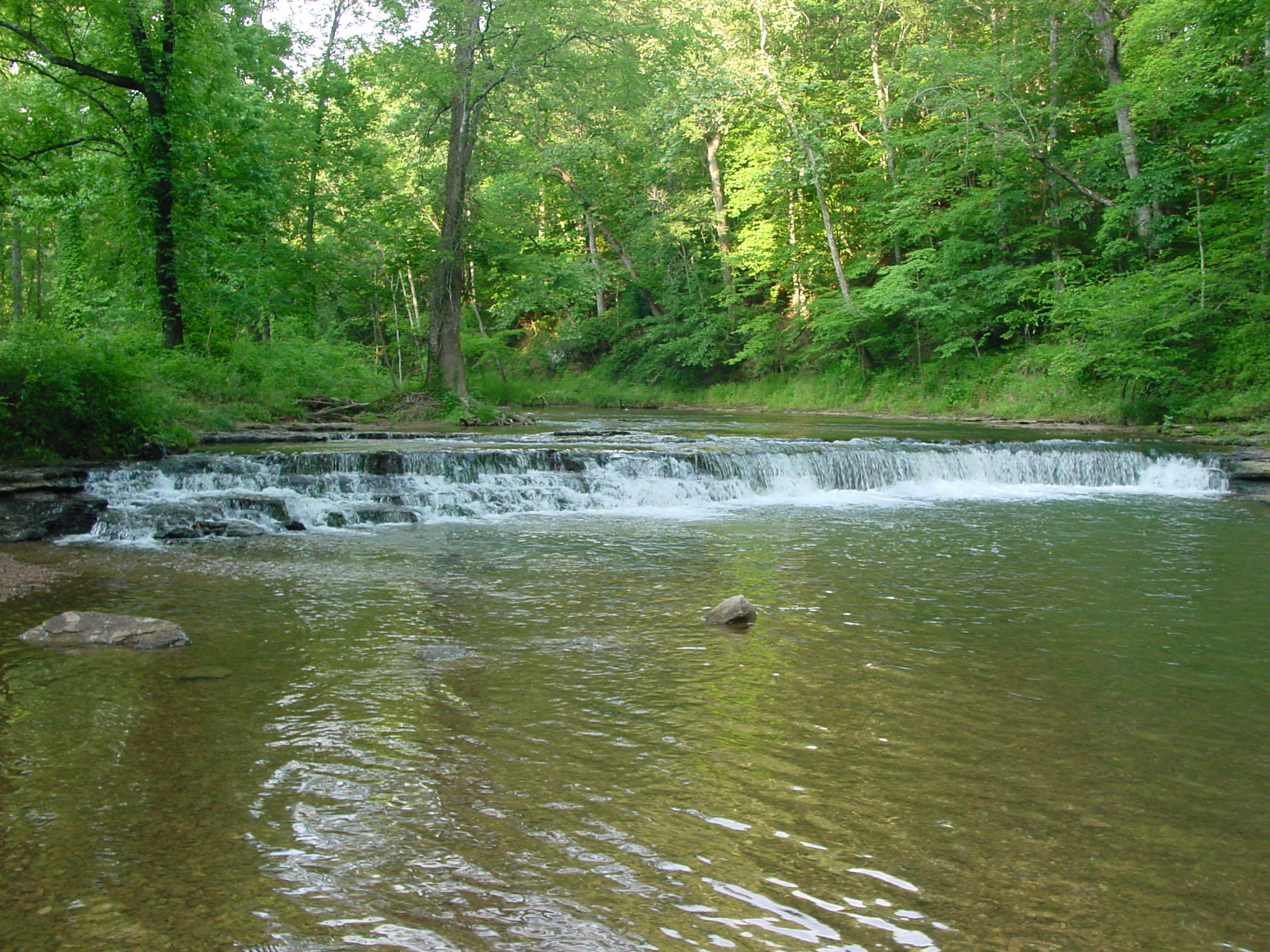
- Crockett Falls in David Crockett State Park
- Interactive map of David Crockett State Park
- Type: State Park
- Location: Lawrenceburg, Tennessee
- Area: 1,319 acres (5,340,000 m^{2})
- Created: 1959
- Operator: Tennessee Department of Environment and Conservation
- Website: David Crockett State Park

David Crockett State Park is a state park in Lawrenceburg, Tennessee.

The park is located on Shoal Creek (originally called the Sycamore River) and commemorates the historical activities of famous frontiersman David Crockett in the local area. Crockett settled near the creek bank in 1817 and started a powder mill, grist mill and distillery using the creek's water power. By 1820, he owned 614 acres (248 ha) of land at Shoal Creek. He also served as one of Lawrence County's first commissioners and justices of the peace. After his industrial operations were destroyed by a flood in September 1821, Crockett left the area and moved to West Tennessee. The park was established in 1959 on 1,100 acres (450 ha) of land that includes the site where Crockett had his mills and distillery.

Park facilities include reconstructions of a dam and mill. A historical museum in the park, open during the summer months, is focused on Crockett's life. A covered bridge built across Shoal Creek in 1959 was destroyed by flooding in 1998 and replaced the following year. A 40-acre (16 ha) lake offers opportunities for fishing and boating.

Visitor facilities include two campgrounds and a restaurant. Seven two-bedroom visitor cabins built in the park in 2010 were the first vacation homes in a U.S. state park to receive LEED Silver certification from the U.S. Green Building Council.

http://vhhhkps4ci.sap.minth.intra:8000/sap/bc/gui/sap/its/ewm_mobgui?sap-client=860&sap-language=EN&~WEBGUI_ALLOW_ZOOM_MOBGUI=82#
