= Flintville, Tennessee =

Unincorporated community in Lincoln County, Tennessee

- Unincorporated community
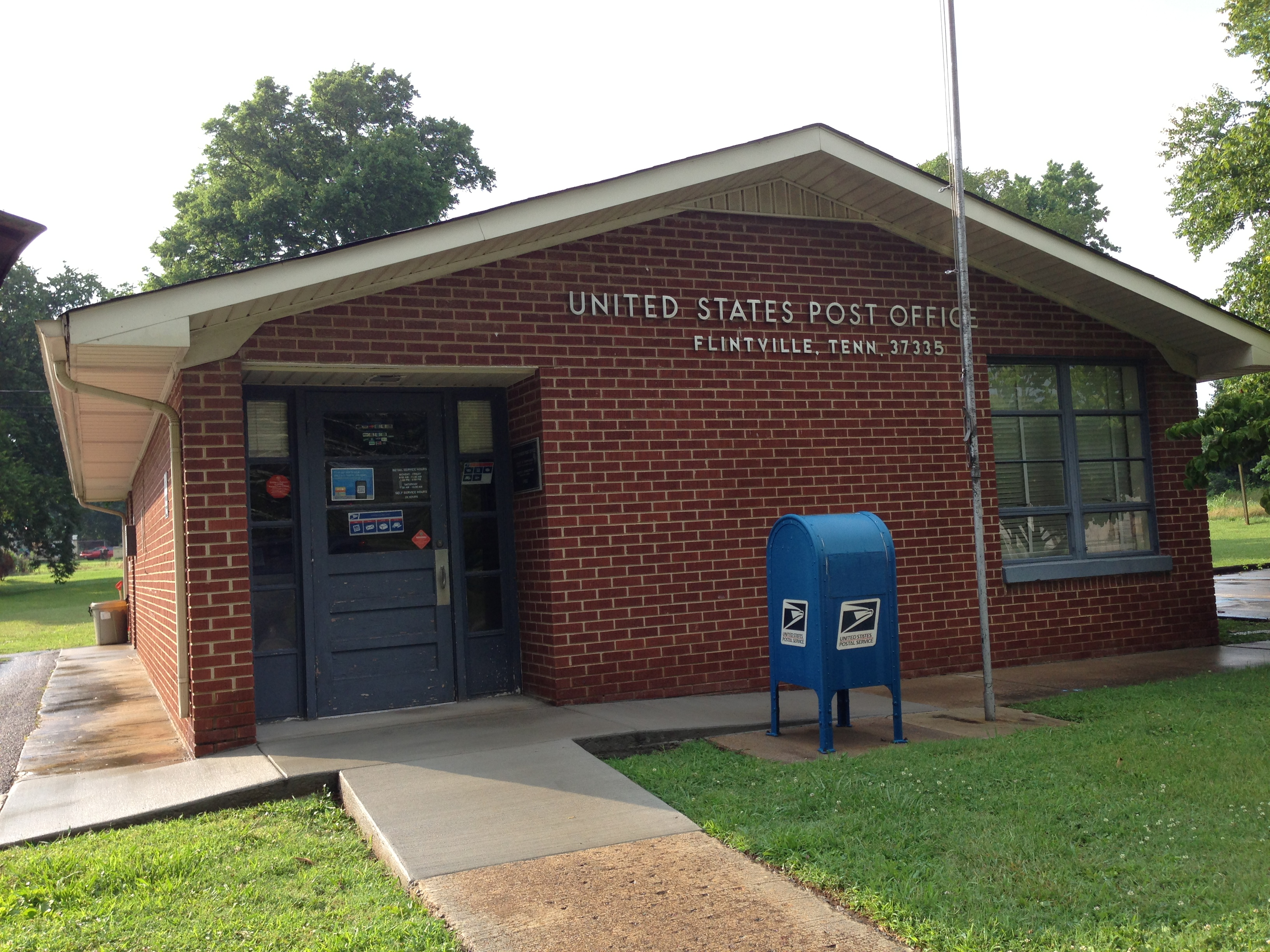
- Flintville Post office (2013)

- Location within Lincoln County and Tennessee
- Coordinates: 35°3′45.31″N 86°25′10.97″W
- Country: United States
- State: Tennessee
- County: Lincoln

Area
  - Total: 5.32 sq mi (13.79 km^{2})
  - Land: 5.32 sq mi (13.79 km^{2})
  - Water: 0 sq mi (0.00 km^{2})
- Elevation: 902 ft (275 m)

Population (2020)
  - Total: 722
  - Density: 136/sq mi (52.4/km^{2})
- Time zone: UTC-6 (CST)
  - Summer (DST): UTC-5 (CDT)
- ZIP Code: 37335
- Area code: 931
- FIPS code: 47-26580
- GNIS ID: 1284492

Flintville is an unincorporated community in Lincoln County, Tennessee, United States. As of the 2010 census, its population was 627. Flintville is located approximately 10.5 miles (16.9 km) southeast of Fayetteville along Tennessee State Route 275 highway.

== Demographics ==
Historical population
Census	Pop.	Note	%±
2020	722		—
U.S. Decennial Census

For statistical purposes, the United States Census Bureau has defined this community as a census-designated place (CDP).

== Government ==
Flintville has a post office with ZIP code 37335, which opened on February 16, 1861.
