= Savannah, Tennessee =

- City
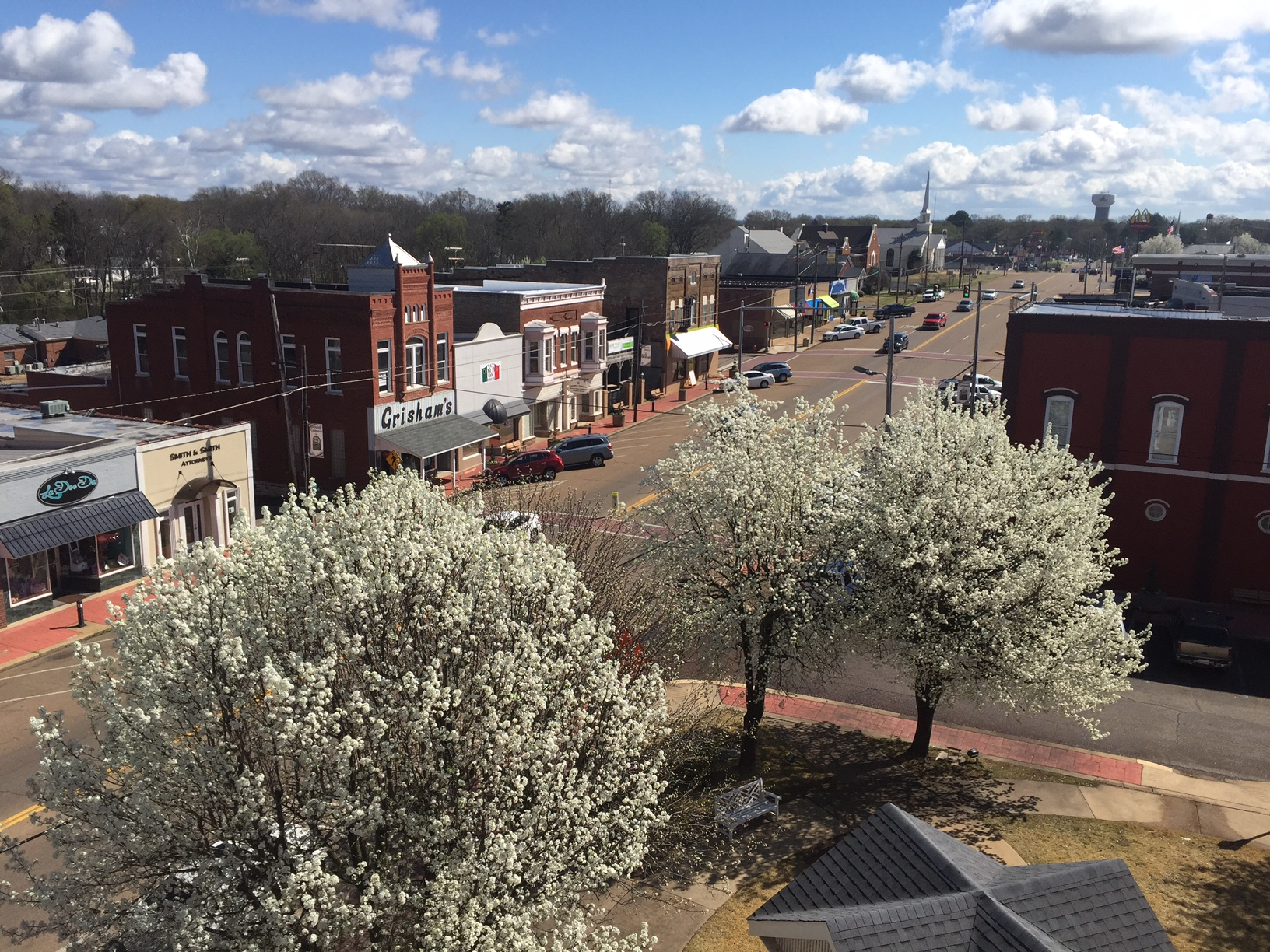
- City square

- Location of Savannah in Hardin County, Tennessee
- Coordinates: 35°13′25″N 88°14′13″W
- Country: United States
- State: Tennessee
- County: Hardin
- Settled: 1820s
- Incorporated: 1833

Government
  - Type: City Commission
  - Mayor: Robert Shutt
  - Vice Mayor: Wes Wilkerson

Area
  - Total: 6.82 sq mi (17.67 km^{2})
  - Land: 6.82 sq mi (17.67 km^{2})
  - Water: 0 sq mi (0.00 km^{2})
- Elevation: 443 ft (135 m)

Population (2020)
  - Total: 7,213
  - Density: 1,057.4/sq mi (408.27/km^{2})
- Time zone: UTC-6 (Central (CST))
  - Summer (DST): UTC-5 (CDT)
- ZIP code: 38372
- Area code: 731
- FIPS code: 47-66720
- GNIS feature ID: 1300820
- Website: www.cityofsavannah.org

Savannah is a city in and the county seat of Hardin County, Tennessee, United States. The population was 7,213 at the 2020 census. Savannah is located along the east side of the Tennessee River.

Savannah hosted the NAIA college football national championship game from 1996 to 2007, and is home to several places of historical significance, including the Cherry Family Mansion.

== History ==
The city's original name was "Rudd's Ferry", named for James Rudd, an early settler who established a ferry at the site in the early 1820s. Rudd's Ferry was later purchased by a wealthy landowner, David Robinson. The city was renamed "Savannah" after Savannah, Georgia, the hometown of Rudd's wife, Elizabeth.

=== Battle of Shiloh ===
Hardin County was the site of the 1862 Battle of Shiloh (also known as the "Battle of Pittsburg Landing") during the Civil War. The battleground site is 10 miles (16 km) southwest of the city of Savannah. Union General Ulysses S. Grant commandeered the Cherry Mansion just off the city square for use as a headquarters during the battle.

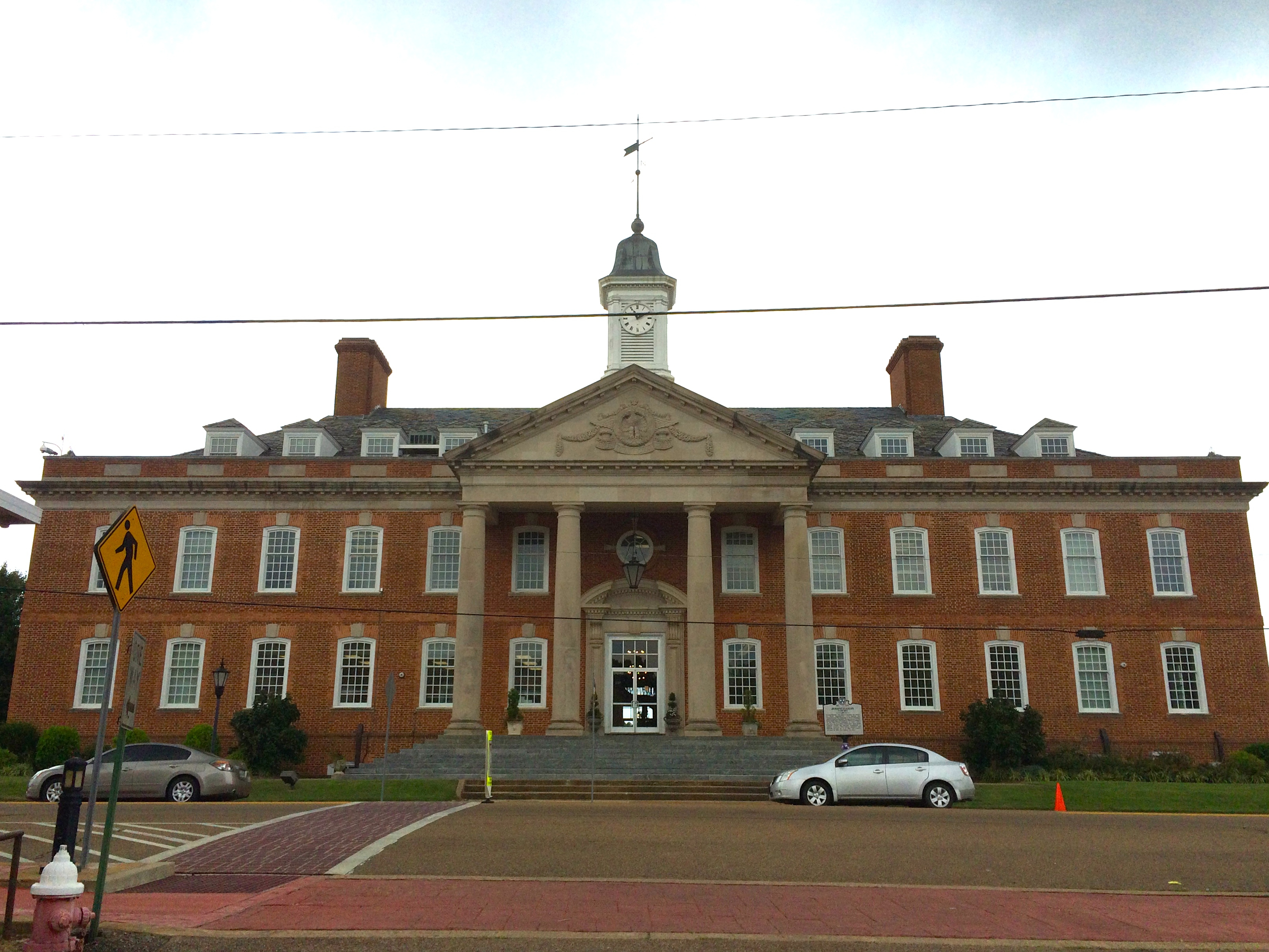
Savannah Courthouse

=== Pickwick Landing State Park ===
Pickwick Landing State Park is 12 miles (19 km) south of Savannah. Originally a steamboat stop, the Tennessee Valley Authority bought the site in the 1930s during the Great Depression and constructed a dam and Pickwick Lake so electricity could be generated. In 1969, Tennessee bought 681 acres (276 ha) from the TVA and made it a state park.

== Geography ==
Savannah is located just west of the center of Hardin County at 35°13′25″N 88°14′13″W (35.223674, -88.237011), on the east bank of the Tennessee River. The CDP of Olivet borders Savannah to the East. U.S. Route 64 passes through the center of town on Bridge Avenue, Main Street, and Wayne Road. US 64 leads east 30 miles (48 km) to Waynesboro and west 21 miles (34 km) to Selmer. Tennessee State Route 69 leads southeast 26 miles (42 km) to the Alabama border. Florence, Alabama, is 49 miles (79 km) southeast of Savannah via SR 69 and Alabama State Route 20.

According to the United States Census Bureau, Savannah has a total area of 6.5 square miles (16.9 km^{2}), all of it recorded as land.

=== Climate ===
Climate data for Savannah 6 SW, Tennessee (1991–2020 normals, extremes 1895–present)
Month	Jan	Feb	Mar	Apr	May	Jun	Jul	Aug	Sep	Oct	Nov	Dec	Year
Record high °F (°C)	79 (26)	84 (29)	90 (32)	95 (35)	99 (37)	108 (42)	112 (44)	109 (43)	111 (44)	97 (36)	89 (32)	79 (26)	112 (44)
Mean daily maximum °F (°C)	51.1 (10.6)	55.7 (13.2)	64.9 (18.3)	73.9 (23.3)	81.3 (27.4)	88.2 (31.2)	91.3 (32.9)	90.9 (32.7)	85.6 (29.8)	75.8 (24.3)	63.9 (17.7)	54.0 (12.2)	73.0 (22.8)
Daily mean °F (°C)	40.7 (4.8)	44.4 (6.9)	52.6 (11.4)	61.5 (16.4)	70.0 (21.1)	77.4 (25.2)	80.7 (27.1)	79.7 (26.5)	73.5 (23.1)	62.5 (16.9)	51.7 (10.9)	43.7 (6.5)	61.5 (16.4)
Mean daily minimum °F (°C)	30.3 (−0.9)	33.0 (0.6)	40.4 (4.7)	49.2 (9.6)	58.7 (14.8)	66.5 (19.2)	70.1 (21.2)	68.6 (20.3)	61.4 (16.3)	49.3 (9.6)	39.5 (4.2)	33.5 (0.8)	50.0 (10.0)
Record low °F (°C)	−13 (−25)	−10 (−23)	6 (−14)	23 (−5)	32 (0)	33 (1)	45 (7)	44 (7)	33 (1)	22 (−6)	1 (−17)	−10 (−23)	−13 (−25)
Average precipitation inches (mm)	4.88 (124)	5.36 (136)	5.64 (143)	5.73 (146)	6.19 (157)	4.40 (112)	4.91 (125)	4.11 (104)	4.28 (109)	3.88 (99)	4.19 (106)	5.61 (142)	59.18 (1,503)
Average precipitation days (≥ 0.01 in)	10.9	10.7	12.3	10.7	11.3	9.8	10.2	8.8	7.3	8.0	9.6	12.4	122.0
Source: NOAA

== Demographics ==
Historical population
Census	Pop.	Note	%±
1850	466		—
1870	328		—
1880	1,006		206.7%
1890	1,087		8.1%
1920	758		—
1930	1,129		48.9%
1940	1,504		33.2%
1950	1,698		12.9%
1960	4,315		154.1%
1970	5,576		29.2%
1980	6,992		25.4%
1990	6,547		−6.4%
2000	6,917		5.7%
2010	6,982		0.9%
2020	7,213		3.3%

County courthouse dedication plaque at the city square

=== 2020 census ===
As of the 2020 census, Savannah had a population of 7,213, and the median age was 40.9 years; 23.6% of residents were under the age of 18 and 22.0% of residents were 65 years of age or older. For every 100 females there were 84.7 males, and for every 100 females age 18 and over there were 79.5 males.

As of the 2020 census, there were 2,990 households in Savannah, of which 30.0% had children under the age of 18 living in them. Of all households, 33.4% were married-couple households, 18.6% were households with a male householder and no spouse or partner present, and 39.4% were households with a female householder and no spouse or partner present. About 35.9% of all households were made up of individuals and 17.4% had someone living alone who was 65 years of age or older. There were 1,622 families residing in the city.

As of the 2020 census, there were 3,385 housing units in Savannah, of which 11.7% were vacant. The homeowner vacancy rate was 3.3% and the rental vacancy rate was 7.5%.

As of the 2020 census, 98.8% of residents lived in urban areas while 1.2% lived in rural areas.

Racial composition as of the 2020 census
Race	Number	Percent
White	6,159	85.4%
Black or African American	501	6.9%
American Indian and Alaska Native	31	0.4%
Asian	68	0.9%
Native Hawaiian and Other Pacific Islander	1	0.0%
Some other race	68	0.9%
Two or more races	385	5.3%
Hispanic or Latino (of any race)	174	2.4%

=== 2000 census ===
As of the census of 2000, there was a population of 6,917, with 2,915 households and 1,862 families residing in the city. The population density was 1,207.5 inhabitants per square mile (466.2/km^{2}). There were 3,206 housing units at an average density of 559.7 per square mile (216.1/km^{2}). The racial makeup of the city was 89.79% White, 8.56% African American, 0.22% Native American, 0.29% Asian, 0.01% Pacific Islander, 0.35% from other races, and 0.78% from two or more races. Hispanic or Latino of any race were 1.13% of the population.

There were 2,915 households, out of which 27.9% had children under the age of 18 living with them, 45.3% were married couples living together, 15.0% had a female householder with no husband present, and 36.1% were non-families. 32.8% of all households were made up of individuals, and 15.8% had someone living alone who was 65 years of age or older. The average household size was 2.25 and the average family size was 2.83.

In the city, the population was spread out, with 22.4% under the age of 18, 8.6% from 18 to 24, 24.3% from 25 to 44, 24.0% from 45 to 64, and 20.7% who were 65 years of age or older. The median age was 41 years. For every 100 females, there were 85.3 males. For every 100 females age 18 and over, there were 79.7 males.

The median income for a household in the city was $22,779, and the median income for a family was $29,771. Males had a median income of $26,311 versus $20,219 for females. The per capita income for the city was $15,101. About 20.7% of families and 23.9% of the population were below the poverty line, including 28.4% of those under age 18 and 16.5% of those age 65 or over.

== Government ==
Savannah is governed by a mayor and a four-member city commission. It uses the city commission government system with the mayor being elected by the four commissioners. The city commission chooses among its members a vice mayor.

=== City Commission ===
List of City Commission Members
Role	Member	Term Expires
Mayor	Robert E. Shutt	2028
Vice Mayor	Matthew Smith	2028
Commissioner	Kent Collier	2028
Commissioner	Stephen Johnson	2026
Commissioner	Blake White	2026

== Notable people ==
- John Barnhill, football player, coach, and collegiate athletics administrator
- Stubby Clapp, Major League baseball player and coach
- Geron Davis, musician and composer
- Hank DeBerry, Major League baseball catcher in the early 20th century
- Otis Floyd, President of Tennessee State University and the first African American Chancellor of the Tennessee State Board of Regents
- Simon Haley, college professor and administrator and father of author Alex Haley
- W. S. Holland, rock-and-roll or rockabilly drummer for Carl Perkins and Johnny Cash
- Jim Hardin, Major League pitcher from 1967 to 1973, World Series champion in 1970
- Tom Hampton, Multi-instrumentalist, session musician, sideman, singer, and songwriter
- Bolden Reush Harrison, naval officer and Medal of Honor recipient
- Chad Harville, Major League pitcher
- Granville Hinton, politician
- Myles Horton, educator and civil rights activist
- Vernon McGarity, Army Technical Sargent and Medal of Honor recipient
- Elizabeth Patterson, actress in films and on I Love Lucy
- Randy Rinks, businessman and politician
- Herman L. Wolfe, Sr., politician
- Darryl Worley, country music performer
