= Tennessee State Route 7 =

Highway in Tennessee

State Route 7
- SR 7; primary in red, secondary in blue, unsigned in green

Route information
- Maintained by TDOT
- Length: 80.75 mi (129.95 km)
- Existed: October 1, 1923–present

Major junctions
- South end: SR 53 at Alabama state line in Ardmore
- I-65 / US 31 south of Elkton; US 64 in Pulaski; SR 11 / SR 15 in Pulaski; US 31A in Pulaski; US 43 / US 412 in Columbia; Natchez Trace Parkway near Fly
- North end: SR 46 / SR 100 near Bon Aqua

Location
- Country: United States
- State: Tennessee
- Counties: Lincoln, Giles, Maury, Hickman

Highway system
- Tennessee State Routes; Interstate; US; State
← SR 6	→ SR 8

State Route 7 (SR 7) is a south–north state highway in Middle Tennessee, running from the Alabama state line in Lincoln County to SR 100/SR 46 in Hickman County.

== Route description ==
=== Alabama state line to Columbia ===
SR 7 begins concurrent with Alabama State Route 53 (AL 53) at Lewter Chapel Drive on the Alabama–Tennessee state line in Lincoln County as a secondary highway. They then go west and intersect SR 110 before separating from AL SR 53, entering Giles Gounty and Ardmore, Tennessee, and continuing west to an interchange with I-65 (Exit 1). At this interchange, SR 7 becomes the unsigned companion route of US 31. US 31/SR 7 then leave Ardmore and go north to Elkton and have a short concurrency with SR 273. They continue north through rural Giles County before having a junction with US 64 before entering Pulaski. SR 7 then becomes a primary highway and they come to an intersection with SR 11 and SR 15, becoming concurrent with SR 11. They go north through downtown and then come to the southern terminus of US 31A, with SR 11 separating and following it. US 31/SR 7 then leave Pulaski and goes north to the community of Waco, just west of Lynnville, and meets the western end of SR 129. The pair then crosses into Maury County and goes through Hopewell before entering Columbia.

=== Columbia to Bon Aqua ===
In Columbia, US 31/SR 7 intersect SR 50 before entering downtown and becoming concurrent with US 412 Bus/SR 99. They come to an intersection where SR 7 separates and turns northwest, becoming signed once again as a primary highway. SR 7 then goes northwest alone and intersects US 43/US 412/SR 6 before leaving Columbia. It then goes north to the community of Santa Fe and has an intersection and short concurrency with SR 247. It then continues northwest to the community of Fly and has an interchange with the Natchez Trace Parkway. SR 7 then crosses into Hickman County and passes through Primm Springs and ends at an intersection with SR 46 and SR 100 in Bon Aqua.

== Major intersections ==
County	Location	mi	km	Destinations	Notes
Lincoln	Ardmore	0.00	0.00	SR 53 south (Main Street) – Huntsville	Southern terminus; south end of SR 53 concurrency along Alabama state line; road continues as SR 53 south
Giles	Ardmore	0.9	1.4	SR 110 east (Bowman Street) – Taft, Fayetteville	Western terminus of SR 110
Giles	Ardmore	1.2	1.9	SR 7 Truck north (Austin Street)	Southern terminus of SR 7 Truck
Giles	Ardmore	1.5	2.4	SR 53 south (Ardmore Avenue) to SR 251	North end of SR 53 concurrency
Giles	Ardmore	1.6	2.6	SR 7 Truck south (Ardmore Ridge Road) – Public Park, Arena, Ballpark	Northern terminus of SR 7 Truck
Giles	Ardmore	3.8– 4.1	6.1– 6.6	US 31 south / I-65 – Huntsville, Nashville	South end of US 31 concurrency; I-65 exit 1
Giles	Elkton	6.9	11.1	SR 273 west (Prospect Road) – Prospect	Southern end of SR 273 concurrency
Giles	Elkton	7.9	12.7	SR 273 east (Bryson Road) to I-65	Northern end of SR 273 concurrency
Giles	Pulaski	18.4	29.6	US 64 (Lawrenceburg Highway/Fayetteville Highway) – Lawrenceburg, Fayetteville	
Giles	Pulaski	20.6	33.2	SR 11 south / SR 15 (College Street) – Minor Hill, Lawrenceburg, Fayetteville	Southern end of SR 11 concurrency
Giles	Pulaski	21.4	34.4	US 31A north (E Grigsby Street/SR 11 north) to I-65 – Cornersville, Lewisburg	Southern terminus of US 31A; northern end of SR 11 concurrency
Giles	Waco	33.8	54.4	SR 129 east (Waco Road) – Lynnville, Cornersville	Western terminus of SR 129
Maury	Columbia	49.5	79.7	SR 50 (James Campbell Boulevard) – Centerville, Lewisburg	
Maury	Columbia	51.3	82.6	US 412 Bus. west (SR 99/W 7th Street) – Hohenwald	Southern end of US 412 Bus concurrency
Maury	Columbia	51.8	83.4	US 31 north / US 412 Bus. east (SR 99/Garden Street north)	Northern end of US 31/US 412 Bus. concurrency
Maury	Columbia	53.3	85.8	US 43 / US 412 (SR 6) – Mount Pleasant, Chapel Hill	Interchange via connector road
Maury	Santa Fe	61.5	99.0	SR 247 west (Snow Creek Road) – Williamsport	Southern end of SR 247 concurrency
Maury	Santa Fe	61.7	99.3	SR 247 east (Snow Creek Road) – Santa Fe, Spring Hill	Northern end of SR 247 concurrency
Maury	Fly	69.2	111.4	Natchez Trace Parkway	Interchange via connector road
Hickman	Bon Aqua	80.75	129.95	SR 46 / SR 100 – Dickson, Centerville, Nashville	Northern terminus; road continues as SR 46 north
1.000 mi = 1.609 km; 1.000 km = 0.621 mi: Concurrency terminus

== Truck route ==
State Route 7 Truck
- Location: Ardmore

SR 7 has one bannered route, State Route 7 Truck (SR 7 Truck) in Ardmore. The Truck Route begins, with secondary status, at SR 7 and Alabama State Route 53, on the Tennessee–Alabama line, on Austin Street heading north. At the intersection with Smith Avenue, SR 7 Truck curves west onto Austin Whitt Road. It then turns left onto Ardmore Ridge Road, where it picks up primary status, and passes by Ardmore City Park. The route ends at SR 7 on the Tennessee side north of the railroad underpass near the state line. The road exists primarily to allow tall trucks to bypass the low underpass.

== See also ==
- List of state routes in Tennessee
