= Tennessee State Route 274 =

Highway in Tennessee

State Route 274
- Old Railroad Bed Road
- SR 274 highlighted in red

Route information
- Maintained by TDOT
- Length: 13.1 mi (21.1 km)
- Existed: July 1, 1983–present

Major junctions
- South end: CR 11 at the Alabama state line near Taft
- SR 110 in Taft
- North end: SR 273 near Fayetteville

Location
- Country: United States
- State: Tennessee
- Counties: Lincoln

Highway system
- Tennessee State Routes; Interstate; US; State
← SR 273	→ I-275

State Route 274 (SR 274), also known as Old Railroad Bed Road, is a 13.1-mile-long (21.1 km) north–south state highway in western Lincoln County, Tennessee.

== Route description ==
SR 274 begins as a continuation of County Road 11 (CR 11) at the Alabama state line. It heads north through farmland to pass through the community of Taft, where it has an intersection with SR 110. The highway then winds its northward through several rural hills and valleys for several miles, where it crosses a bridge over the Elk River, before coming to an end at an intersection with SR 273 between Dellrose and Fayetteville. The entire route of SR 274 is a rural two-lane highway.

== Major intersections ==
The entire route is in Lincoln County.

Location	mi	km	Destinations	Notes
	0.0	0.0	CR 11 south (Old Railroad Bed Road) – Toney	Southern terminus; Alabama state line
Taft	2.0	3.2	SR 110 (Ardmore Highway) – Ardmore, Fayetteville	
	10.0	16.1	Bridge over the Elk River	
	13.1	21.1	SR 273 (Old Elkton Pike) – Elkton, Dellrose, Fayetteville	Northern terminus
1.000 mi = 1.609 km; 1.000 km = 0.621 mi
