= Tennessee State Route 110 =

State highway in Tennessee, United States

State Route 110
- SR 110 highlighted in red

Route information
- Maintained by TDOT
- Length: 22.5 mi (36.2 km)

Major junctions
- West end: SR 7 / SR 53 at the Alabama state line in Ardmore
- SR 274 in Taft
- East end: US 231 / US 431 (SR 10) in Fayetteville

Location
- Country: United States
- State: Tennessee
- Counties: Giles, Limestone and Lincoln

Highway system
- Tennessee State Routes; Interstate; US; State
← SR 109	→ SR 111

State Route 110 (SR 110) is a Tennessee state highway in Limestone County, Alabama, and Giles and Lincoln counties in Tennessee.

It connects Ardmore, Tennessee, and its twin city of Ardmore, Alabama, with Fayetteville, Tennessee.

== Route description ==
SR 110 begins in Ardmore, Tennessee/Alabama at the Tennessee-Alabama state line at an intersection with TN SR 7 and AL SR 53. It then travels northeastward and leaves Ardmore and goes through rural southern Middle Tennessee. It continues a northeastward trek, where it passes through Blanche, until just before its junction with SR 274 at Taft, then turns southeastward and then back northeastward to pass through Kirkland. It ends at an intersection with US 231/US 431 (SR 10) in Fayetteville city limits just south downtown.

== Junction list ==
County	Location	mi	km	Destinations	Notes
Giles	Ardmore	0.00	0.00	SR 7 / SR 53 (Main Street) – Elkton, Harvest, AL	Western terminus at the Alabama state line
Lincoln	Taft	8.9	14.3	SR 274 (Old Railroad Bed Road) – Dellrose, Harvest, AL	
Lincoln	Fayetteville	22.5	36.2	US 231 / US 431 (Huntsville Highway/SR 10) – Downtown Fayetteville, Park City, Hazel Green, AL	Eastern terminus
1.000 mi = 1.609 km; 1.000 km = 0.621 mi
