= Tennessee State Route 273 =

State highway in Tennessee, United States

State Route 273
- SR 273 highlighted in red

Route information
- Maintained by TDOT
- Length: 36.9 mi (59.4 km)
- Existed: July 1, 1983–present

Major junctions
- West end: SR 166 near Prospect
- US 31 in Elkton; I-65 in Elkton; SR 274 near Dellrose; US 64 near Fayetteville
- East end: US 64 Byp. / US 231 / US 431 in Fayetteville

Location
- Country: United States
- State: Tennessee
- Counties: Giles, Lincoln

Highway system
- Tennessee State Routes; Interstate; US; State
← SR 272	→ SR 274

State Route 273 (SR 273) is a 36.9-mile-long (59.4 km) east–west state highway traversing the hills of southern Middle Tennessee.

== Route description ==
SR 273 begins in Giles County at an intersection with SR 166. It winds its way east through some hills and begins paralleling the Elk River, which it does for the rest of the highway's length, to pass through the community of Prospect. The highway then turns northeast and passes through more Hill and then farmland, where it crosses a bridge over Richland Creek, before entering Elkton and coming to an intersection with US 31/SR 7. It turns north along a short concurrency with US 31/SR 7 to pass by several homes and businesses before splitting off and going northeast again to have an interchange with I-65 (Exit 6). SR 273 then crosses into Lincoln County and continues winding its way northeast through a mix of farmland and wooded hills to pass through the community of Dellrose. The highway has an intersection with SR 274 before coming to an intersection and becoming concurrent with US 64/SR 15. Prior to this point, the entire route of SR 273 is a two-lane highway. SR 273 becomes unsigned as it continues east along US 64/SR 15 as a 4-lane undivided highway to enter Fayetteville along Washington Street to come to an intersection with US 64 Bypass (Wilson Parkway). The highway then narrows to 2-lane and passes through residential areas, where they make turns onto Morgan Avenue and College Street, before entering downtown and coming to an intersection with US 431/SR 50 (Main Avenue), where SR 50 heads east along US 64/SR 15 while SR 273 heads south along US 431 and Main Avenue. They head south through downtown before coming to the banks of the Elk River, where SR 273 comes to an end at an intersection with US 64 Bypass/US 231/SR 10 (Wilson Parkway/Thornton Taylor Parkway), with US 431 continuing south along US 231/SR 10 and Main Avenue.

== Major intersections ==
County	Location	mi	km	Destinations	Notes
Giles		0.0	0.0	SR 166 (Bethel Road) – Pulaski, Bethel, Elkmont, AL	Western terminus
Giles				Carter-Nelson Bridge over Richland Creek	
Giles	Elkton			US 31 south (Elkton Pike/SR 7 south) – Ardmore	Western end of US 31/SR 7 concurrency
Giles	Elkton			US 31 north (Elkton Pike/SR 7 north) – Pulaski	Eastern end of US 31/SR 7 concurrency
Giles	Elkton			I-65 – Nashville, Huntsville	I-65 exit 6
Lincoln				SR 274 south (Old Railroad Bed Road) – Taft	Northern terminus of SR 274
Lincoln				US 64 west (Pulaski Highway/SR 15 west) – Pulaski	Western end of US 64/SR 15 concurrency; SR 273 becomes unsigned
Lincoln	Fayetteville			US 64 Byp. east (Wilson Parkway) – Winchester	Western terminus of US 64 Bypass
Lincoln	Fayetteville			US 64 (College Street/SR 15 east/SR 50 east) – Winchester, Lynchburg US 431 north (Main Avenue/SR 50 west) – Petersburg, Lewisburg	Eastern end of US 64/SR 15 concurrency; western end of US 431 concurrency
Lincoln	Fayetteville	36.9	59.4	US 64 Byp. / US 231 north (Wilson Parkway/Thornton Taylor Parkway/SR 10 north) – Pulaski, Shelbyville, Winchester US 231 south / US 431 south (Main Avenue/SR 10 south) – Park City, Huntsville, AL	Eastern terminus; SR 273 ends as an unsigned highway
1.000 mi = 1.609 km; 1.000 km = 0.621 mi: Concurrency terminus
