= Bucksnort =

Bucksnort or Buck Snort may refer to:

- Bucksnort, Tennessee, Hickman County
- Buck Snort, Arkansas, Craighead County
- Bucksnort (Alabama)
- Bucksnort (Minnesota)
- Bankston, Alabama, Fayette County, formerly called Bucksnort
- Edinburg, Missouri, Grundy County, formerly called Buck Snort
- Mimosa, Tennessee, Lincoln County, formerly called Bucksnort
- Sarahville de Viesca, Texas, Falls County, ghost town also called Bucksnort
