= Blanche, Tennessee =

- Census-designated place
- Location within Tennessee Location within the United States
- Coordinates: 35°2′33″N 86°45′15″W
- Country: United States
- State: Tennessee
- County: Lincoln

Area
  - Total: 5.88 sq mi (15.24 km^{2})
  - Land: 5.88 sq mi (15.24 km^{2})
  - Water: 0 sq mi (0.00 km^{2})
- Elevation: 905 ft (276 m)

Population (2020)
  - Total: 310
  - Density: 52.7/sq mi (20.35/km^{2})
- Time zone: UTC-6 (Central (CST))
  - Summer (DST): UTC-5 (CDT)
- ZIP Code: 38488 (Taft)
- Area code: 931
- FIPS code: 47-06440
- GNIS feature ID: 2813098

Blanche is an unincorporated community and census-designated place (CDP) in Lincoln County, Tennessee, United States. It was first listed as a CDP prior to the 2020 census.

It is in the southwest part of the county and is bordered to the southeast by Taft. Tennessee State Route 110 passes through Blanche, leading southwest 7 miles (11 km) to Ardmore and northeast 18 miles (29 km) to Fayetteville, the Lincoln county seat.

The east side of Blanche drains to Pinnel Creek, and the west side drains Kelly Creek; both creeks flow north to the Elk River, a southwest-flowing tributary of the Tennessee River. The south part of the CDP drains to Limestone Creek, which flows south to the Tennessee River in Alabama.

== Demographics ==
Historical population
Census	Pop.	Note	%±
2020	310		—
U.S. Decennial Census
