= Alabama State Route 249 =

State highway in Alabama, United States

State Route 249

Route information
- Maintained by ALDOT
- Length: 5.801 mi (9.336 km)

Major junctions
- South end: Eastern gate of Fort Novosel
- US 231 in Ozark
- North end: SR 27 in Ozark

Location
- Country: United States
- State: Alabama
- Counties: Dale

Highway system
- Alabama State Highway System; Interstate; US; State
← SR 248	→ SR 251

State Route 249 (SR 249) is a 5.801-mile-long (9.336 km) route in the United States that serves as a connection between Alabama's SR 27 in Ozark with Fort Novosel.

== Route description ==
SR 249 begins at the eastern gate of Fort Novosel southwest of Ozark in Dale County, heading northeast on four-lane undivided Andrews Avenue. The route runs along the border between Fort Novosel to the west and Ozark to the east, passing through wooded areas with some fields, homes, and businesses, intersecting CR 21 and CR 34. The road fully enters Ozark and runs through woodland with some residences, intersecting CR 101 before coming to a junction with US 231/SR 53 in a commercial area. Past this, SR 249 becomes a five-lane road with a center left-turn lane that passes more businesses before coming to its northern terminus at SR 27, where Andrews Avenue continues northeast as part of that route.

== Major intersections ==
The entire route is in Ozark, Dale County.

mi	km	Destinations	Notes
0.000	0.000	Eastern gate of Fort Novosel	Southern terminus; end state maintenance
5.192	8.356	US 231 (SR 53) – Brundidge, Dothan	
5.801	9.336	SR 27 (Enterprise Road/Andrews Avenue) – Abbeville, Enterprise	Northern terminus
1.000 mi = 1.609 km; 1.000 km = 0.621 mi
