= Paul L. Bolden =

United States Army Medal of Honor recipient(1922–1979)

Paul Luther Bolden
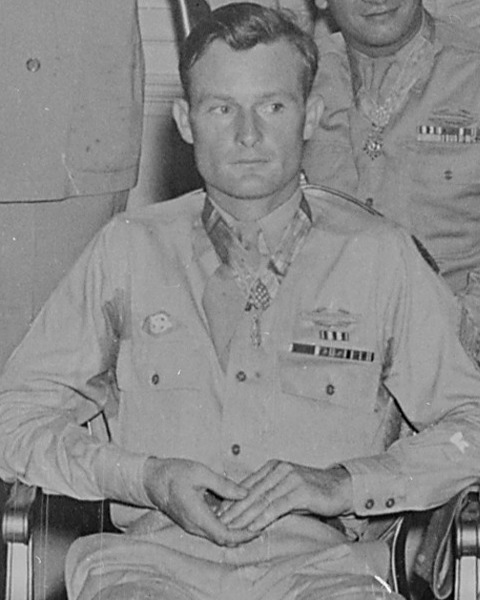
- Paul Bolden after receiving his Medal of Honor from President Harry S. Truman on August 23, 1945
- Born: June 15, 1922; Hobbs Island, Alabama, US
- Died: May 21, 1979 (aged 56); Huntsville, Alabama, US
- Burial place: Moon Cemetery; Owens Cross Roads, Alabama
- Military career
- Allegiance: United States
- Branch: United States Army
- Service years: 1942–1945
- Rank: Master Sergeant
- Units: 120th Infantry Regiment, 30th Infantry Division
- Conflicts: World War II
- Awards: Medal of Honor; Silver Star; Bronze Star(3); Purple Heart

Paul Luther Bolden (June 15, 1922 – May 21, 1979) was a United States Army soldier and a recipient of the United States military's highest decoration—the Medal of Honor—for his actions in World War II.

== Biography ==
Bolden joined the Army from Madison, Alabama in October 1942, and by December 23, 1944, was serving as a staff sergeant in Company E, 120th Infantry Regiment, 30th Infantry Division. On that day, at Petit-Coo, Belgium, he and Technical Sergeant Russell N. Snoad advanced on a German-held house. While his comrade provided covering fire from across the street, Bolden tossed grenades through a window, rushed to the door, and began firing. Wounded by the greatly superior number of German soldiers inside, he retreated from the house. Realizing that the Germans would not surrender, he returned to the house despite his serious wounds and killed the remaining soldiers. For these actions, he was awarded the Medal of Honor eight months later, on August 23, 1945.

Snoad, who was killed in the fighting, was posthumously awarded the Distinguished Service Cross for his valor in combat.

Bolden reached the rank of Master Sergeant before leaving the Army. He died at age 56 and was buried in Moon Cemetery, Owens Cross Roads, Alabama.

An 18-mile stretch of Alabama State Route 53, from Research Park Boulevard in Huntsville to just south of Ardmore, is designated as the "Paul Luther Bolden Memorial Highway" in his honor.

== Medal of Honor citation ==
Bolden's official Medal of Honor citation reads:

He voluntarily attacked a formidable enemy strong point in Petit-Coo, Belgium, on 23 December 1944, when his company was pinned down by extremely heavy automatic and small-arms fire coming from a house 200 yards to the front. Mortar and tank artillery shells pounded the unit, when S/Sgt. Bolden and a comrade, on their own initiative, moved forward into a hail of bullets to eliminate the ever-increasing fire from the German position. Crawling ahead to close with what they knew was a powerfully armed, vastly superior force, the pair reached the house and took up assault positions, S/Sgt. Bolden under a window, his comrade across the street where he could deliver covering fire. In rapid succession, S/Sgt. Bolden hurled a fragmentation grenade and a white phosphorus grenade into the building; and then, fully realizing that he faced tremendous odds, rushed to the door, threw it open and fired into 35 SS troopers who were trying to reorganize themselves after the havoc wrought by the grenades. Twenty Germans died under fire of his submachinegun before he was struck in the shoulder, chest, and stomach by part of a burst which killed his comrade across the street. He withdrew from the house, waiting for the surviving Germans to come out and surrender. When none appeared in the doorway, he summoned his ebbing strength, overcame the extreme pain he suffered and boldly walked back into the house, firing as he went. He had killed the remaining 15 enemy soldiers when his ammunition ran out. S/Sgt. Bolden's heroic advance against great odds, his fearless assault, and his magnificent display of courage in reentering the building where he had been severely wounded cleared the path for his company and insured the success of its mission.

== See also ==
- List of Medal of Honor recipients
