= Don Childers =

American politician (1932–2026)

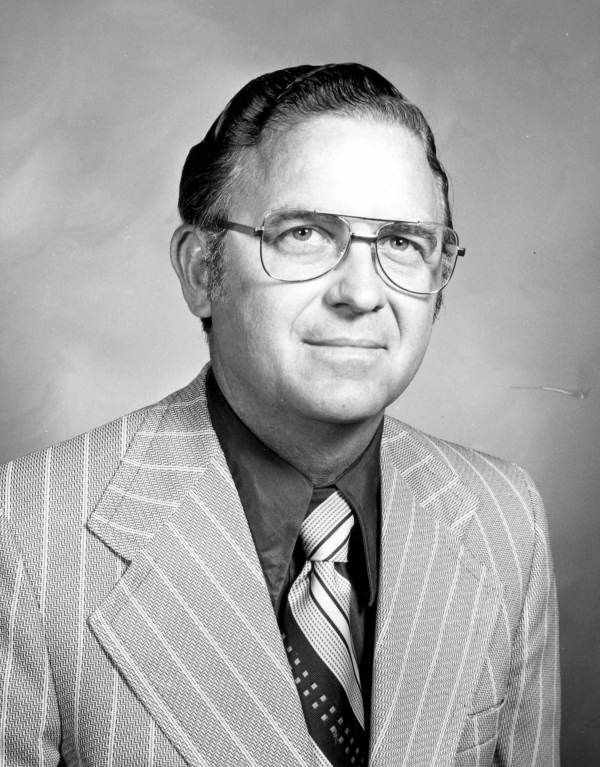

Member of the Florida Senate from the 28th district
- In office 1975–1990
- Preceded by: Tom Johnson
- Succeeded by: Robert Wexler

Personal details
- Born: Donnell Carl Childers; March 3, 1932 Skipperville, Alabama, U.S.
- Died: March 27, 2026 (aged 94) West Palm Beach, Florida, U.S.
- Party: Democratic
- Education: Troy University
- Occupation: Contractor

Donnell Carl Childers (March 3, 1932 – March 27, 2026) was an American businessman and politician from the state of Florida. He served in the State Senate from 1975 to 1990.

== Life and career ==
Childers was born in Skipperville, Alabama, on March 3, 1932. He attended Troy State University where he earned a Bachelor of Science degree, and moved to Florida in 1960. He was a contractor and member of a bank advisory board.

In 1974, he was elected to the State Senate for the 28th district, and he served until 1990.

Childers died in West Palm Beach, Florida, on March 27, 2026, at the age of 94.
