= Kirkland, Tennessee =

Kirkland, Tennessee may refer to:

- Kirkland, Lincoln County, Tennessee, an unincorporated community in Lincoln County
- Kirkland, Williamson County, Tennessee, an unincorporated community in Williamson County
