= Alabama State Route 27 =

State highway in Alabama, United States

State Route 27

Route information
- Maintained by ALDOT
- Length: 74.285 mi (119.550 km)

Major junctions
- South end: CR 185 at Florida state line southwest of Geneva, AL
- SR 52 in Geneva; US 84 / SR 167 in Enterprise; US 231 in Ozark; US 431 near Abbeville
- North end: US 431 near Abbeville

Location
- Country: United States
- State: Alabama
- Counties: Geneva, Coffee, Dale, Henry

Highway system
- Alabama State Highway System; Interstate; US; State
← SR 26	→ SR 28

State Route 27 (SR 27) is a 74.285-mile-long (119.550 km) state highway in the southeastern part of the U.S. state of Alabama. The southern terminus of the highway is at the Florida state line, where the route serves as a continuation of County Road 185 (CR 185). The northern terminus of the highway is at the intersection with U.S. Route 431 (US 431), at Abbeville.

== Route description ==
Entering Alabama in eastern Geneva County, SR 27 is primarily a two-lane highway. It serves as a connector from the Gulf coast beaches along the Florida Panhandle to major highways such as US 84 and US 231. Between the cities of Geneva and Enterprise, the highway's orientation is generally north-to-south. Upon leaving Enterprise, the highway assumes a northeastward trajectory as it leads into Dale County. East of Ozark, the highway, while still signed as “north” and “south”, assumes an east–west orientation until its terminus at Abbeville, at U.S. Route 431 (US 431),

== Major intersections ==
County	Location	mi	km	Destinations	Notes
Geneva		0.000	0.000	CR 185 south – DeFuniak Springs	Florida state line
Geneva	Geneva	4.813	7.746	SR 196 west (East Magnolia Avenue)	
Geneva	Geneva	5.951	9.577	SR 52 west (East Maple Avenue) – Samson	south end of SR 52 concurrency
Geneva	Geneva	6.396	10.293	SR 52 east – Hartford	north end of SR 52 concurrency
Geneva	Geneva	7.135	11.483	SR 85 north – Bellwood, Daleville	
Coffee	Enterprise	25.845	41.593	To SR 192 (Boll Weevil Circle) / US 84 / SR 134 / SR 167 – Opp, Dothan, Fort Novosel, Enterprise-Ozark Community College	
Coffee	Enterprise	27.334	43.990	SR 88 east / SR 134 east (South Main Street)	south end of SR 88/SR 134 concurrency
Coffee	Enterprise	27.768	44.688	SR 88 west / SR 134 west (North Main Street)	south end of SR 88/SR 134 concurrency
Coffee	Enterprise	28.016	45.087	SR 248 east (Glover Avenue)	
Coffee	Enterprise	29.125	46.872	US 84 / SR 167 (Boll Weevil Circle / SR 12) – Elba, Dothan, Enterprise Municipal Airport	
Dale	Ozark	44.660	71.873	US 231 north (SR 53) – Troy	south end of US 231/SR 53 concurrency
Dale	Ozark	44.811	72.116	US 231 south (SR 53) – Ozark, Dothan	north end of US 231/SR 53 concurrency
Dale	Ozark	45.859	73.803	US 231 Bus. north / SR 249 south (Andrews Avenue) – Fort Novosel	south end of US 231 Bus. concurrency
Dale	Ozark	46.564	74.937	US 231 Bus. south / SR 123 (North Union Avenue)	north end of US 231 Bus. concurrency
Dale	Ozark	47.259	76.056	SR 105 north (Broad Street)	
Henry		71.816	115.577	SR 173 south – Dothan, Newville	
Henry	Abbeville	74.285	119.550	US 431 (SR 1) – Eufaula, Headland}	
Henry	Abbeville	1.000 mi = 1.609 km; 1.000 km = 0.621 mi			
