= Alabama State Route 88 =

Highway in Alabama, US

State Route 88

Route information
- Maintained by ALDOT
- Length: 3.310 mi (5.327 km)

Major junctions
- West end: US 84 / SR 192 in Enterprise
- East end: SR 167 / SR 192 in Enterprise

Location
- Country: United States
- State: Alabama
- Counties: Coffee

Highway system
- Alabama State Highway System; Interstate; US; State
← SR 87	→ SR 89

State Route 88 (SR 88) is a 3.310-mile-long (5.327 km) state highway completely within the city limits of Enterprise, in Coffee County. The western terminus of the highway is at an intersection with U.S. Route 84 north of town. The eastern terminus of the highway is at an intersection with SR 167/SR 192 in the southeastern part of town. SR 88 heads through downtown Enterprise before following Plaza Drive.

== Route description ==
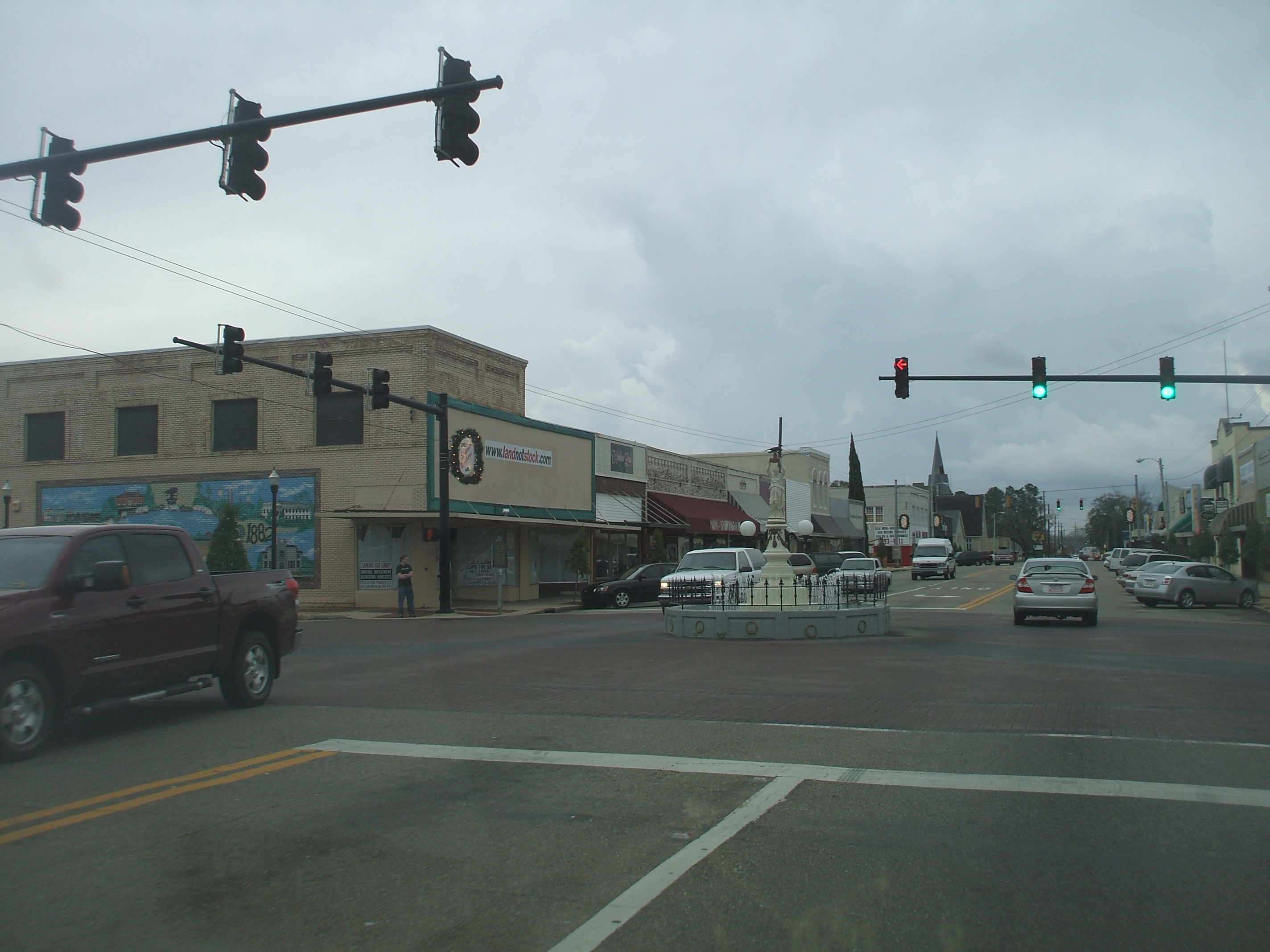
SR 27/SR 88/SR 134 (Main Street) at the Boll Weevil Monument at the College Street intersection in Enterprise

SR 88 begins at an intersection with US 84/SR 12/SR 192 on the northern edge of Enterprise. North of here, the road becomes a part of US 84/SR 12. From the Boll Weevil Circle, the beltway around Enterprise, SR 88 heads south on North Main Street, a three-lane road with a center left-turn lane. The highway travels through commercial areas a short distance to the west of a Wiregrass Central Railroad line. The highway eventually crosses the railroad line and turns southeast into more residential areas, reaching an intersection with SR 134. At this point, SR 134 joins SR 88 for a concurrency. Main Street heads into the commercial downtown of Enterprise, narrowing to two lanes. In the center of town, SR 27 joins SR 88/SR 134 on North Main Street and the road comes to the Boll Weevil Monument at the College Street intersection one block later, where the name changes to South Main Street. The highways leave the downtown, passing under the Wiregrass Central Railroad. SR 27 splits from the road by heading to the south, with SR 88/SR 134 turning southeast past more businesses, widening into a four-lane undivided road. The road curves to the east and becomes East Park Avenue. SR 88 splits from SR 134 by heading southeast on four-lane Plaza Drive, becoming a signed road at this point. The highway passes a mix of homes and businesses, passing Enterprise State Community College. SR 88 reaches its eastern terminus at the Boll Weevil Circle, intersecting SR 167/SR 192. At this point, the road continues as part of SR 167.

== Major intersections ==
The entire route is in Enterprise, Coffee County.

mi	km	Destinations	Notes
0.000	0.000	US 84 (Boll Weevil Circle / SR 12 / SR 192 east) to SR 134 – New Brockton, Dothan, Troy, Elba	Western terminus
0.973	1.566	SR 134 west (Damascus Road) – Opp	Western end of SR 134 concurrency
1.406	2.263	SR 27 north (East Lee Street) to SR 248	Western end of SR 27 concurrency
1.840	2.961	SR 27 south (Geneva Highway)	Eastern end of SR 27 concurrency
2.351	3.784	SR 134 east (East Park Avenue) – Daleville, Fort Novosel, Dothan	Eastern end of SR 134 concurrency
3.310	5.327	SR 167 / SR 192 west (Boll Weevil Circle) to US 84 west / SR 27 south – Dothan, Elba, Geneva	Eastern terminus
1.000 mi = 1.609 km; 1.000 km = 0.621 mi: Concurrency terminus
