= Hobbs Island, Alabama =

- Unincorporated community
- Location within Alabama Location within the United States
- Coordinates: 34°32′13″N 86°32′05″W
- Country: United States
- State: Alabama
- County: Madison
- Elevation: 597 ft (182 m)
- Time zone: UTC-6 (Central (CST))
  - Summer (DST): UTC-5 (CDT)
- Area code: 256
- GNIS feature ID: 120161

Hobbs Island is an unincorporated community in Madison County, Alabama, United States.

== History ==
Hobbs Island is also the name of a nearby island (formerly known as Chickasaw Island) in the Tennessee River. The island was the site of the Chickasaw town Chickasaw Old Fields. Two mounds and the remnants of a dwelling remain on Hobbs Island. Ditto Landing, formerly the site of a ferry on the Tennessee River, is located adjacent to Hobbs Island. Andrew Jackson's army, including Davy Crockett, crossed at Ditto Landing during the Creek War on their way to fight the Red Sticks.

A post office operated under the name Hobbs Island from 1850 to 1929.

== Geography ==
Despite being called Hobbs Island, the community is not located on the island itself but to the east of the island and the Tennessee River.

== Notable person ==
- Paul L. Bolden, United States Army soldier and recipient of the Medal of Honor for his actions during World War II.
