= Alabama State Route 192 =

State highway in Alabama, United States

State Route 192
- Boll Weevil Circle

Route information
- Maintained by ALDOT
- Length: 6.707 mi (10.794 km)

Major junctions
- West end: US 84 / SR 88 in Enterprise
- SR 27 in Enterprise; SR 134 in Enterprise
- East end: SR 88 / SR 167 in Enterprise

Location
- Country: United States
- State: Alabama
- Counties: Coffee

Highway system
- Alabama State Highway System; Interstate; US; State
← SR 191	→ SR 193

State Route 192 (SR 192) is a 6.707-mile-long (10.794 km) route that serves as a bypass route around western Enterprise.

== Route description ==
The western terminus of SR 192 is located at its intersection with SR 167 south of Enterprise. From this point, the route travels in a northwesterly, and then northerly direction as it circles around the western side of the city. As the route approaches its terminus at US 84, it has completed a half-circle around Enterprise, and westbound SR 192 is actually traveling in an eastward direction.

== Major intersections ==
The entire route is in Enterprise, Coffee County.

mi	km	Destinations	Notes
0.000	0.000	US 84 (N Main Street/Boll Weevil Circle/SR 12) / SR 88 east (N Main Street) – New Brockton, Daleville, Downtown	Western terminus of SR 88 and SR 192
1.665	2.680	SR 134 (Damascus Road) – Opp, Downtown	
5.042	8.114	SR 27 (Geneva Highway) – Geneva, Downtown	
6.302	10.142	CR 606 west (College Street) – Enterprise Municipal Airport	Eastern terminus of CR 606
6.707	10.794	SR 88 west / SR 167 (Plaza Drive/Boll Weevil Circle) to US 84 – Hartford, Downtown	Eastern terminus of SR 88 and SR 192
1.000 mi = 1.609 km; 1.000 km = 0.621 mi
