= Clopton, Alabama =

Unincorporated community in Alabama, United States

- Unincorporated community
- Location within Alabama Location within the United States
- Coordinates: 31°36′31″N 85°25′48″W
- Country: United States
- State: Alabama
- County: Dale
- Elevation: 505 ft (154 m)
- Time zone: UTC-6 (Central (CST))
  - Summer (DST): UTC-5 (CDT)
- ZIP code: 36317
- Area code: 334
- GNIS feature ID: 116275

Clopton is an unincorporated community and census-designated place (CDP) in Dale County, Alabama, United States. Clopton is located on Alabama State Route 105, 10.9 miles (17.5 km) west-northwest of Abbeville.

== History ==
Clopton had a post office from August 22, 1853, to November 19, 2011; it still has its own ZIP code, 36317.

During the Spanish flu epidemic, in 1919 a local physician reported that he had treated more than four hundred cases in the community.

== Demographics ==
Historical population
Census	Pop.	Note	%±
1880	142		—
U.S. Decennial Census

Clopton was listed as an unincorporated community in the 1880 U.S. Census with a population of 142.

== Notable people ==
- Henry B. Steagall, U.S. Representative from 1915 to 1943. Co-sponsored the Glass-Steagall Act and Wagner-Steagall National Housing Act.
- Hannah McKay, a fictional character portrayed by Yvonne Strahovski who is romantically involved with Dexter Morgan on Dexter.
