= Shady Grove, Lincoln County, Tennessee =

Shady Grove, Tennessee
- Unincorporated community
- Location within Tennessee Location within the United States
- Coordinates: 35°06′15″N 86°20′07″W
- Country: United States
- State: Tennessee
- County: Lincoln
- Elevation: 958 ft (292 m)
- Time zone: UTC-6 (Central (CST))
  - Summer (DST): UTC-5 (CDT)
- Area code: 931
- GNIS feature ID: 1315900

Shady Grove is an unincorporated community in Lincoln County, Tennessee, United States. Shady Grove is located on Tennessee State Route 121 13.7 miles (22.0 km) east-southeast of Fayetteville.
