= New Dellrose, Tennessee =

- Unincorporated community
- Location within Tennessee Location within the United States
- Coordinates: 35°06′34″N 86°48′33″W
- Country: United States
- State: Tennessee
- County: Lincoln
- Elevation: 623 ft (190 m)
- Time zone: UTC-6 (Central (CST))
  - Summer (DST): UTC-5 (CDT)
- Area code: 931
- GNIS feature ID: 1295471

New Dellrose is an unincorporated community in Lincoln County, Tennessee, United States.
