= Alabama State Route 105 =

State highway in Alabama, United States

State Route 105

Route information
- Maintained by ALDOT
- Length: 18.905 mi (30.425 km)
- Existed: 1963–present

Major junctions
- South end: SR 27 in Ozark
- North end: SR 10 near Clopton

Location
- Country: United States
- State: Alabama
- Counties: Dale, Barbour

Highway system
- Alabama State Highway System; Interstate; US; State
← SR 104	→ SR 106

State Route 105 (SR 105) is a minor route in the southeastern part of the U.S. state of Alabama. The route begins at a junction with SR 27 at Ozark and ends at SR 10 at Clopton, an unincorporated community in southeastern Barbour County.

== Route description ==
SR 105 leads northeastward from its intersection with SR 27 in Ozark as it traverses through Dale County. The route travels primarily through rural areas, passing only through the unincorporated community of Skipperville before it crosses into Barbour County. SR 105 then passes through Clopton before coming to an end SR 10.

The route is a two-lane road for its duration.

== Major intersections ==
County	Location	mi	km	Destinations	Notes
Dale	Ozark	0.000	0.000	SR 27 (E Broad Street/Clinton Pl) – Enterprise, Downtown, Abbeville	Southern terminus
Barbour		18.905	30.425	SR 10 – Clio, Blue Springs, Abbeville	Northern terminus; provides access to Blue Springs State Park
1.000 mi = 1.609 km; 1.000 km = 0.621 mi
