= Cooper Pants Factory fire =

1936 building fire in Georgia, United States

- The factory on fire following the tornado, with a large smoke plume visible

- Date: April 6, 1936
- Time: c. 8:30 a.m. (UTC−05:00)
- Location: Cooper Pants Factory, Gainesville, Georgia; 34°17′25″N 83°49′46″W
- Type: Structural failure and resulting building fire
- Cause: Tornado
- Deaths: 70-125
- Injuries: Many

On the morning of April 6, 1936, a devastating tornado hit the Cooper Pants Factory, located in Gainesville, Georgia. The tornado, which received a rating of F4 on the Fujita scale, initiated a partial collapse of the factory, which sparked a fire that trapped up to 125 workers inside, killing over seventy of those who were trapped in the rubble. The collapse resulted in several work-related hearings, many of which ended with monetary compensation to victims. The collapse and resulting fire is the highest death toll in a single building ever hit by a tornado. (Note: As of August 2026)

== Background ==
The Cooper Pants Factory, established in Gainesville around 1893, was a two-story brick clothing factory located at the corner of Maple and West Broad streets, in the heart of the town. The factory serviced Cooper Pants, a clothing company.

=== Gainesville F4 tornado ===
A storm system moved through Alabama through the night of April 5-6 and reached Gainesville, Georgia, at around 8:30 a.m local standard time. According to Ted Fujita, this early morning tornado was a double tornado event: one tornado moved in from the Atlanta highway, while the other moved in from the Dawsonville highway. The two merged on Grove Street and destroyed everything throughout the downtown area, causing wreckage to pile 10 feet (3.0 m) high in some places.

== Fire ==
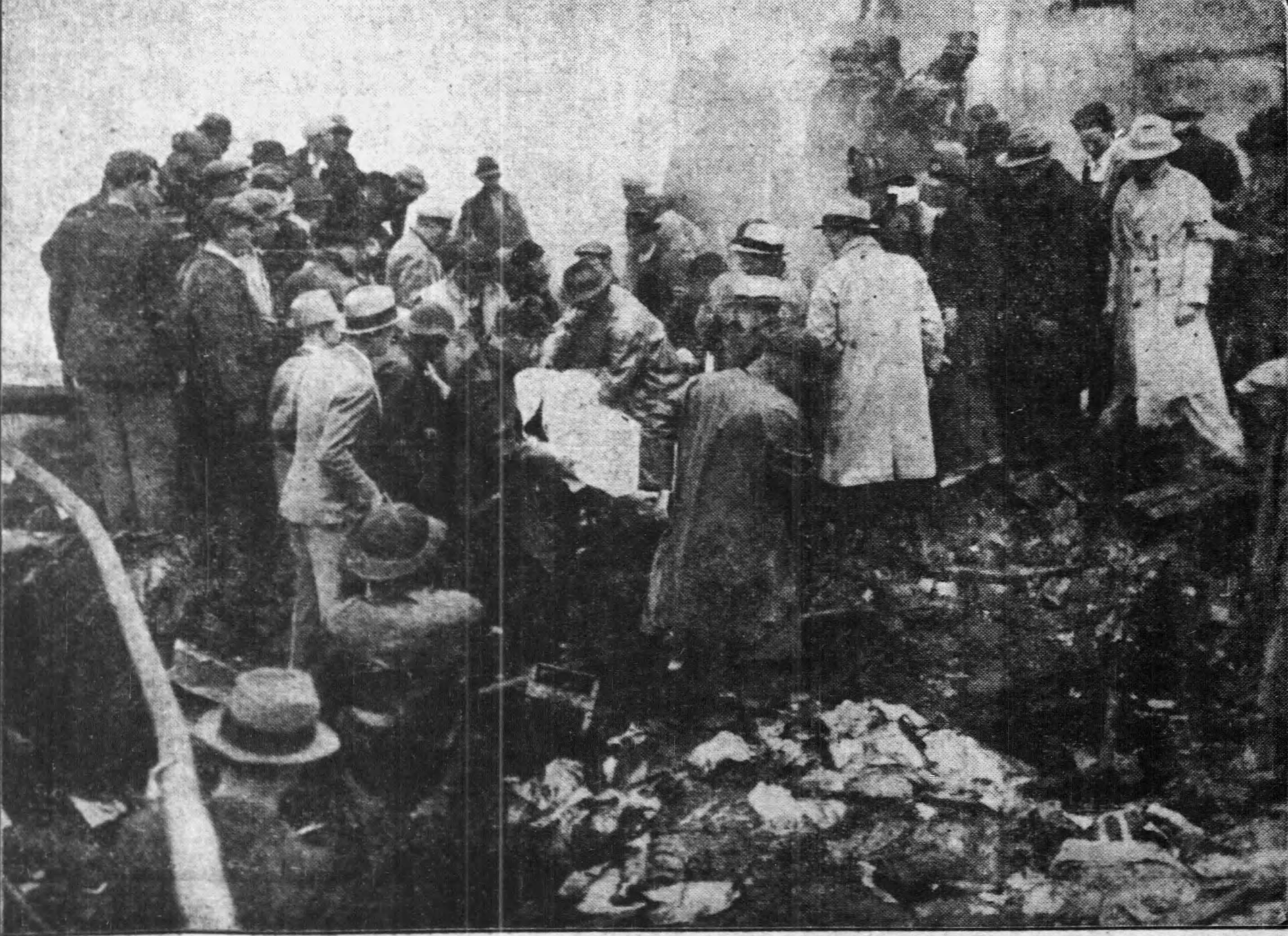
Volunteers removing the charred remains of victims from the destroyed factory.

The fire was ignited when the building partially collapsed shortly after being struck, resulting in a loss of electricity. The Times Leader stated that the building "blew up like and explosion, and fire swept the wreckage". The only stairwell that connected the second floor to the first was blocked by flames, and an estimated 125 workers, over half of the people in the building at the time of the collapse, were trapped on the second floor. It is believed that only three out of the 125 workers at the factory escaped the fire before it engulfed the entire building, killing at least 70.

== Aftermath ==
=== Legal proceedings ===
In the months after the fire, a total of seventy-eight hearings were carried out by those affected by the fire, which were heard by the Georgia Industrial Board and Georgia Workmen's Compensation Board. The Cooper Pants company argued that the tornado was an "act of God" in its defense, and the filing parties argued that the factory machinery was too heavy and that safety equipment was inadequate in the factory.

Almost a year after the tornado, in March 1937, the Georgia Industrial Relations Department awarded a total of $45,158 (1937 USD) to the claimants, although fourteen were not given monetary compensation because of a lack of relation to the victims.

== Legacy ==
The fire was the deadliest instance of tornado deaths at a single location in history, with over seventy people being killed.

== See also ==
- List of F4, EF4, and IF4 tornadoes
  - 2021 Western Kentucky tornado, an EF4 tornado that killed seven workers in a candle factory
