= Belleville, Tennessee =

Unincorporated community in Tennessee, US

Coordinates: 35°16′22″N 86°33′14″W

Belleville is an unincorporated community in Lincoln County, in the U.S. state of Tennessee.

== History ==
A post office called Belleville was established in 1891, and remained in operation until it was discontinued in 1902. The community was likely named for the Bell family of settlers.
