= Alabama State Route 251 =

State highway in Alabama, United States

State Route 251

Route information
- Maintained by ALDOT
- Length: 16.681 mi (26.845 km)

Major junctions
- South end: US 31 in Athens
- North end: SR 53 in Ardmore

Location
- Country: United States
- State: Alabama
- Counties: Limestone

Highway system
- Alabama State Highway System; Interstate; US; State
← SR 249	→ SR 253

State Route 251 (SR 251) is a 16.7-mile-long (26.9 km) route that serves as a connection for U.S. Route 31 (US 31) in Athens with SR 53 in Ardmore.

== Route description ==
The southern terminus of SR 251 is located at an intersection with US 31 opposite Pryor Street in Athens. After crossing I-65 via overpass and exiting the Athens city limits, the route proceeds primarily northeasterly through several unincorporated communities before entering the city limits of Ardmore. The northern terminus is located at an intersection with SR 53 running concurrently with 6th Street. At its northern terminus, SR 251 reverts to Ardmore Avenue, which picks up SR 53.

== History ==
SR 251's entire route was formerly designated as part of US 31 between 1925 and 1956 before it was rerouted onto the corridor of present-day I-65, which it has overlapped on that particular stretch since 1966.

== Major intersections ==
The entire route is in Limestone County.

Location	mi	km	Destinations	Notes
Athens	0.000	0.000	US 31 (SR 3) to I-65 – Decatur, Ardmore	Southern terminus
Ardmore	16.681	26.845	SR 53 (Sixth Street/Ardmore Avenue)	Northern terminus
1.000 mi = 1.609 km; 1.000 km = 0.621 mi
