= Kirkland, Lincoln County, Tennessee =

Kirkland, Tennessee
- Unincorporated community
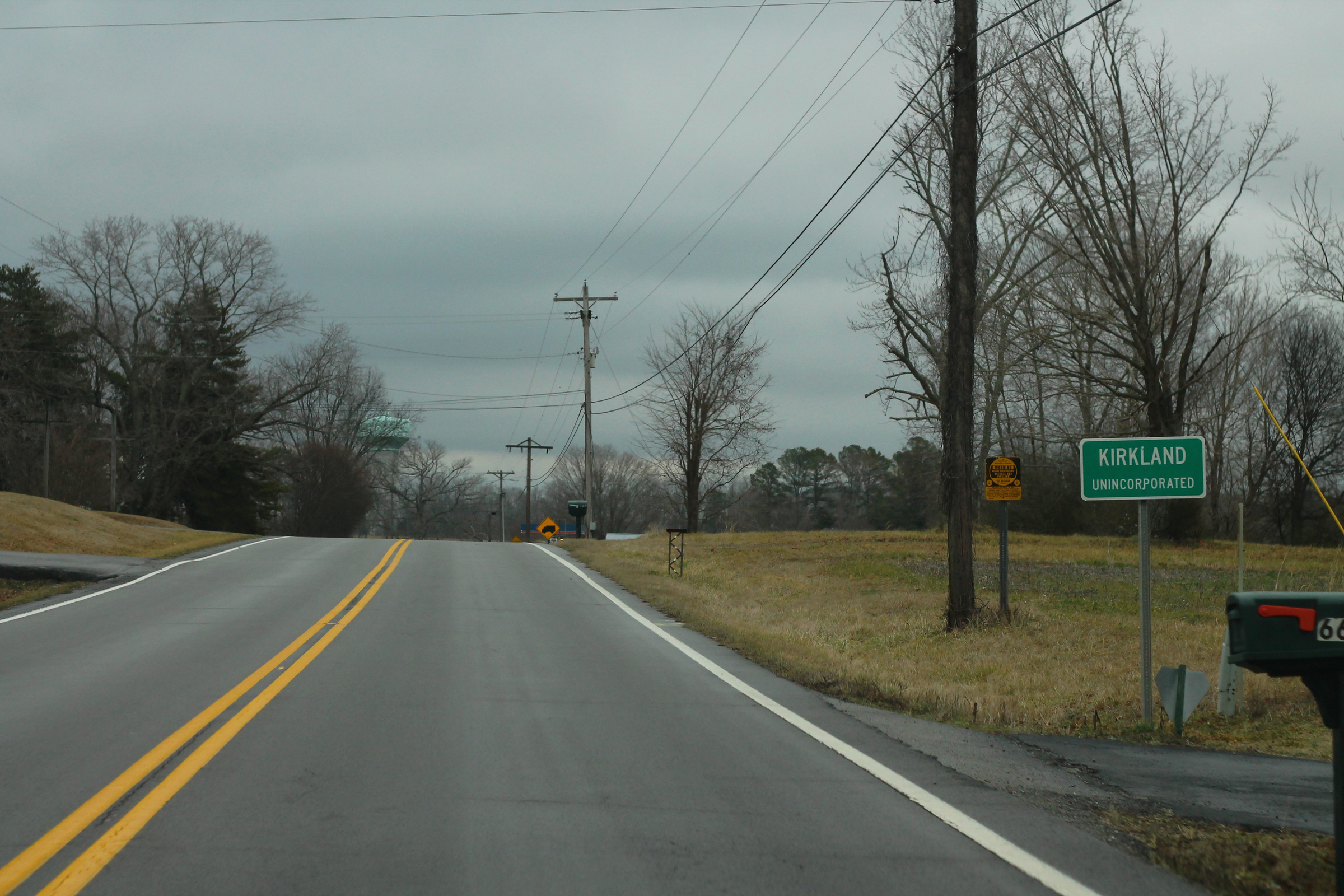
- Kirkland, Tennessee

- Location within Tennessee Location within the United States
- Coordinates: 35°03′44″N 86°37′45″W
- Country: United States
- State: Tennessee
- County: Lincoln
- Elevation: 938 ft (286 m)
- Time zone: UTC-6 (Central (CST))
  - Summer (DST): UTC-5 (CDT)
- Area code: 931
- GNIS feature ID: 1290298

Kirkland is an unincorporated community in Lincoln County, Tennessee, United States. Kirkland is located on Tennessee State Route 110, 7 miles (11 km) southwest of Fayetteville.
