= Mimosa, Tennessee =

- Coordinates: 35°13′15″N 86°31′9″W
- Country: United States
- State: Tennessee
- County: Lincoln County
- Established: early 1800s
- Renamed: 1898

Mimosa is an unincorporated community in Lincoln County, Tennessee, United States. Founded in the early 19th century, it lies north-northeast of the city of Fayetteville. It received its current name in 1898, before which it had been called "Bucksnort."

== History ==
During its heyday, Bucksnort was a well established farming community and much of what is currently known about Bucksnort derives from The Scamps of Bucksnort by Lily Mae Pamplin. From the introduction to "The Scamps of Bucksnort":

"Bucksnort, Tennessee, got its name from William ("Buck") Pamplin, a brother of McCager Armpstead Pamplin, my father's father. Before the Civil War, William owned and lived on the site that later became Bucksnort.

'It was like this: William loved whiskey. He would get soused to the ears with the sweet, smelly stuff, and when he did, he would roar and snort till everyone around heard him. They would say: "Just listen to Buck snort." His snorting became so frequent and the comment was made so often, that the neighbors soon found themselves running the last two words together, thus the place was called Bucksnort.

"In the course of time, a post office was needed. The Government wanted to know what name the community wished to be known by. Since William still owned and lived on the site, and since he still kept up his snorting, the neighbors and near-by farmers decided on Bucksnort. It was approved by the Government and the first post office and surrounding community became Bucksnort."

Bucksnort, a term well known to deer hunters tracking by sound since pioneer days, is the name given to multiple pre-Civil War towns and communities across Tennessee as well as in Marshall County and Bullock County, Alabama; Prentiss County and Tate County, Mississippi; Craighead County and Dallas County, Arkansas.

== Post office ==
The community had a post office from 1887 to 1902.

== See also ==
- Bucksnort, Tennessee
