= Buck Snort, Arkansas =

- Unincorporated community
- Location within Arkansas Location within the United States
- Coordinates: 35°53′35″N 90°38′57″W
- Country: United States
- State: Arkansas
- County: Craighead
- Elevation: 354 ft (108 m)
- Time zone: UTC-6 (Central (CST))
  - Summer (DST): UTC-5 (CDT)
- GNIS feature ID: 64665

Buck Snort was an unincorporated community in Craighead County, Arkansas, United States. The community was also known as Newport, which was the name of the local post office as the Buck Snort name was rejected by the United States Postal Service. The Buck Snort community originated in 1841, when one Joe Willey began operating a gristmill on what was known locally as Buck Snort Hill. The Macedonia Baptist Church opened in the area around that time, followed by the New Haven Methodist Church the following decade. The Newport post office was in existence from September 1, 1852, to February 8, 1859. The Buck Snort community apparently ceased to exist during the American Civil War and by 1868, when the state militia skirmished with the Ku Klux Klan at the former community site, all that remained was Willey's cotton gin. The origin of the name Buck Snort is uncertain but several possibilities have been suggested.
