= Fly, Tennessee =

- Unincorporated community
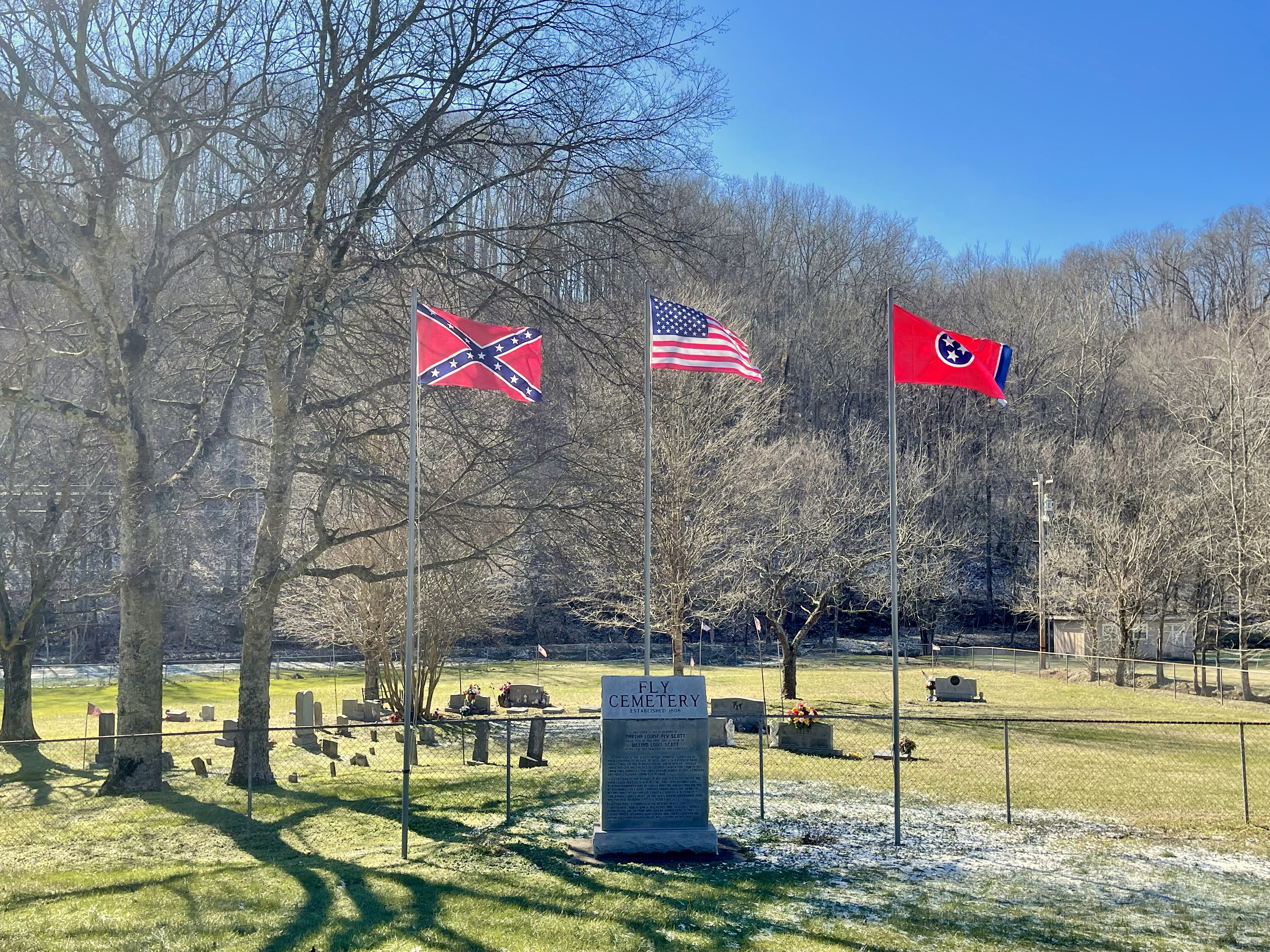
- Fly Cemetery

- Location within Tennessee Location within the United States
- Coordinates: 35°47′22″N 87°9′31″W
- Country: United States
- State: Tennessee
- County: Maury
- Elevation: 650 ft (200 m)
- Time zone: UTC-6 (Central (CST))
  - Summer (DST): UTC-5 (CDT)
- ZIP code: 38482
- Area code: 931
- GNIS feature ID: 1284532

Fly is an unincorporated community in Maury County, Tennessee. It is along the Natchez Trace Parkway, south of Nashville. The small valley known as Fly Hollow is between Fly and the Natchez Trace.

In the early 19th century a number of Fly family members, mostly from North Carolina, moved to this part of Tennessee near the Natchez Trace on Leipers Creek, a tributary of the Duck River. After a rail line was built through the area the settlement was called Fly's Station. The local store is still called Fly's Store.
