= Skipperville, Alabama =

Unincorporated community in Alabama, United States

- Unincorporated community
- Location within Alabama Location within the United States
- Coordinates: 31°33′28″N 85°32′44″W
- Country: United States
- State: Alabama
- County: Dale
- Elevation: 459 ft (140 m)
- Time zone: UTC-6 (Central (CST))
  - Summer (DST): UTC-5 (CDT)
- ZIP code: 36374
- Area code: 334
- GNIS feature ID: 126940

Skipperville is an unincorporated community in Dale County, Alabama, United States. Skipperville is located on Alabama State Route 105, 8.8 miles (14.2 km) northeast of Ozark. Skipperville has a post office with ZIP code 36374, which opened on November 10, 1853. This community also consists of G.W. Long School, which has won a 2a state championship for baseball in many previous years. This school also has other sports teams with state wide victories.

== Demographics ==
Historical population
| Census | Pop. | Note | %± |
|---|---|---|---|
| 1880 | 85 | | — |
U.S. Decennial Census

Skipperville was listed on the 1880 U.S. Census as an unincorporated community with a population of 85, but has not been listed on the census since.

== Notable people ==
- Gerard Bruggink, Dutch pilot
- Julian Tharpe, Hall of Fame pedal steel guitar player was born into a musical family in Skipperville in 1937. Tharpe expanded use of pedal steel to music genres besides Country.
