= Alabama State Route 248 =

State highway in Alabama, United States

State Route 248

Route information
- Maintained by ALDOT
- Length: 6.066 mi (9.762 km)

Major junctions
- West end: SR 27 in Enterprise
- US 84 / SR 167 in Enterprise
- East end: Western gate of Fort Novosel

Location
- Country: United States
- State: Alabama
- Counties: Coffee, Dale

Highway system
- Alabama State Highway System; Interstate; US; State
← SR 247	→ SR 249

State Route 248 (SR 248) is a 6.066-mile-long (9.762 km) route that serves as a connection between U.S. Route 84 (US 84) in Enterprise with Fort Novosel.

== Route description ==
The western terminus of SR 248 is located at its intersection with SR 27 just east of downtown Enterprise in Coffee County. From this point, the route travels in an easterly direction on two-lane undivided Glover Avenue, passing through residential areas. The road widens to four lanes and heads into commercial areas, coming to an intersection with US 84/SR 12/SR 167. Past this intersection, SR 248 becomes Rucker Boulevard and continues through areas of residential neighborhoods and businesses as a five-lane road with a center left-turn lane. Farther east, the road loses the center left-turn lane and continues through areas of fields, woods, and housing developments. The route enters Dale County and continues through a mix of homes and rural areas. SR 248 comes to its eastern terminus at the western gate of Fort Novosel.

== Major intersections ==
County	Location	mi	km	Destinations	Notes
Coffee	Enterprise	0.000	0.000	SR 27 (East Lee Street)	Western terminus
Coffee	Enterprise	1.278	2.057	US 84 / SR 167 (Boll Weevil Circle/SR 12)	
Dale	Enterprise	6.066	9.762	Western gate of Fort Novosel	Eastern terminus; end state maintenance
1.000 mi = 1.609 km; 1.000 km = 0.621 mi
