= Dellrose, Tennessee =

- Unincorporated community
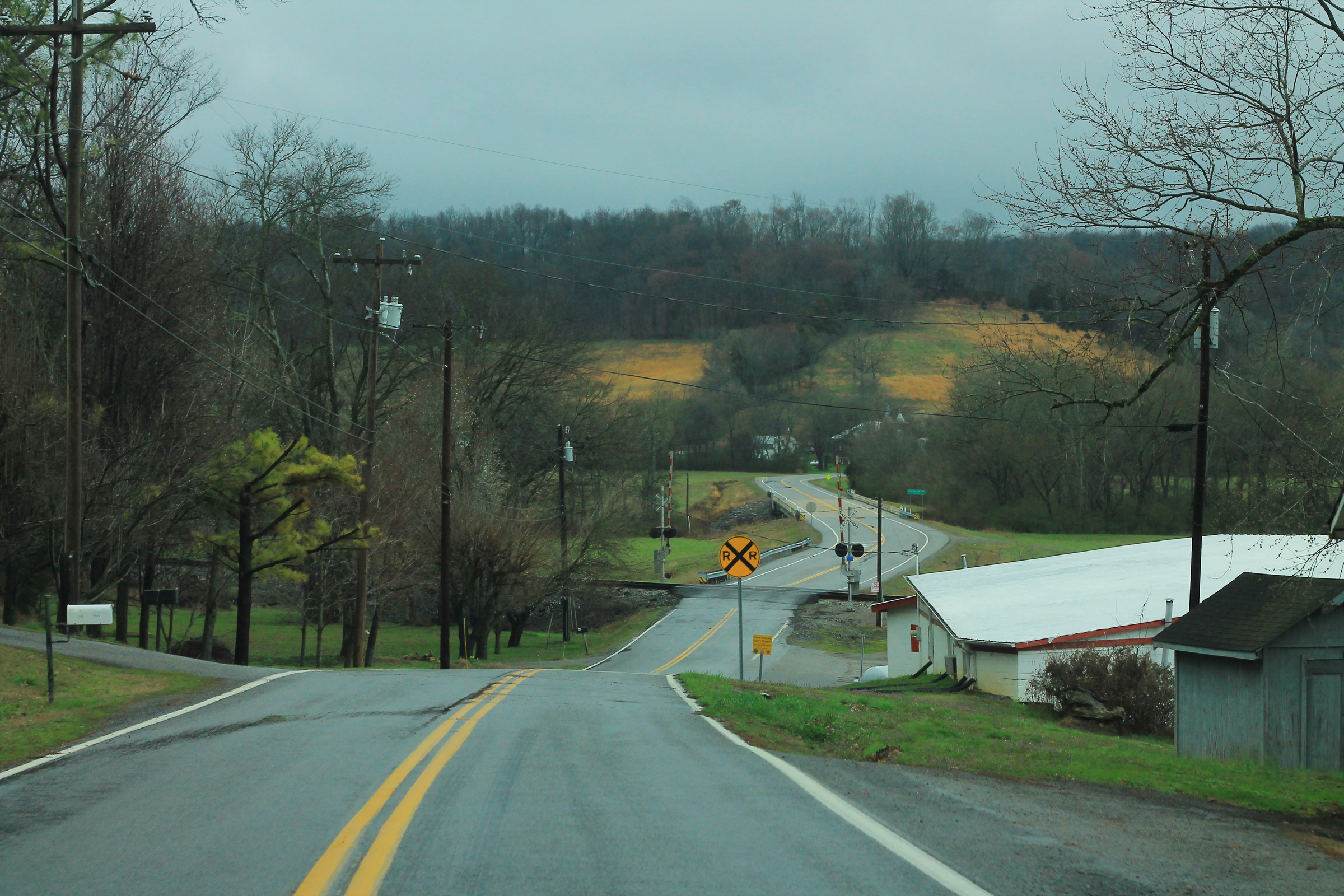
- Dellrose, Tennessee

- Location within Tennessee Location within the United States
- Coordinates: 35°06′47″N 86°48′05″W
- Country: United States
- State: Tennessee
- County: Lincoln

Area
  - Total: 2.26 sq mi (5.86 km^{2})
  - Land: 2.26 sq mi (5.86 km^{2})
  - Water: 0 sq mi (0.00 km^{2})
- Elevation: 673 ft (205 m)

Population (2020)
  - Total: 73
  - Density: 32.2/sq mi (12.45/km^{2})
- Time zone: UTC-6 (Central (CST))
  - Summer (DST): UTC-5 (CDT)
- ZIP code: 38453
- Area code: 931
- GNIS feature ID: 1306325

Dellrose is an unincorporated community in Lincoln County, Tennessee, United States. It has a post office, with ZIP code 38453. It is located along Tennessee State Route 273 between Elkton and Fayetteville.

== Demographics ==
Historical population
Census	Pop.	Note	%±
2020	73		—
U.S. Decennial Census

== History ==
Originally known as "Roosterville", Dellrose was first formed as a village in 1867, although a post office had been present in the area since 1849. By 1886, it was home to several churches as well as a school, blacksmith, and physician.
