= Ardmore, Alabama =

- Town
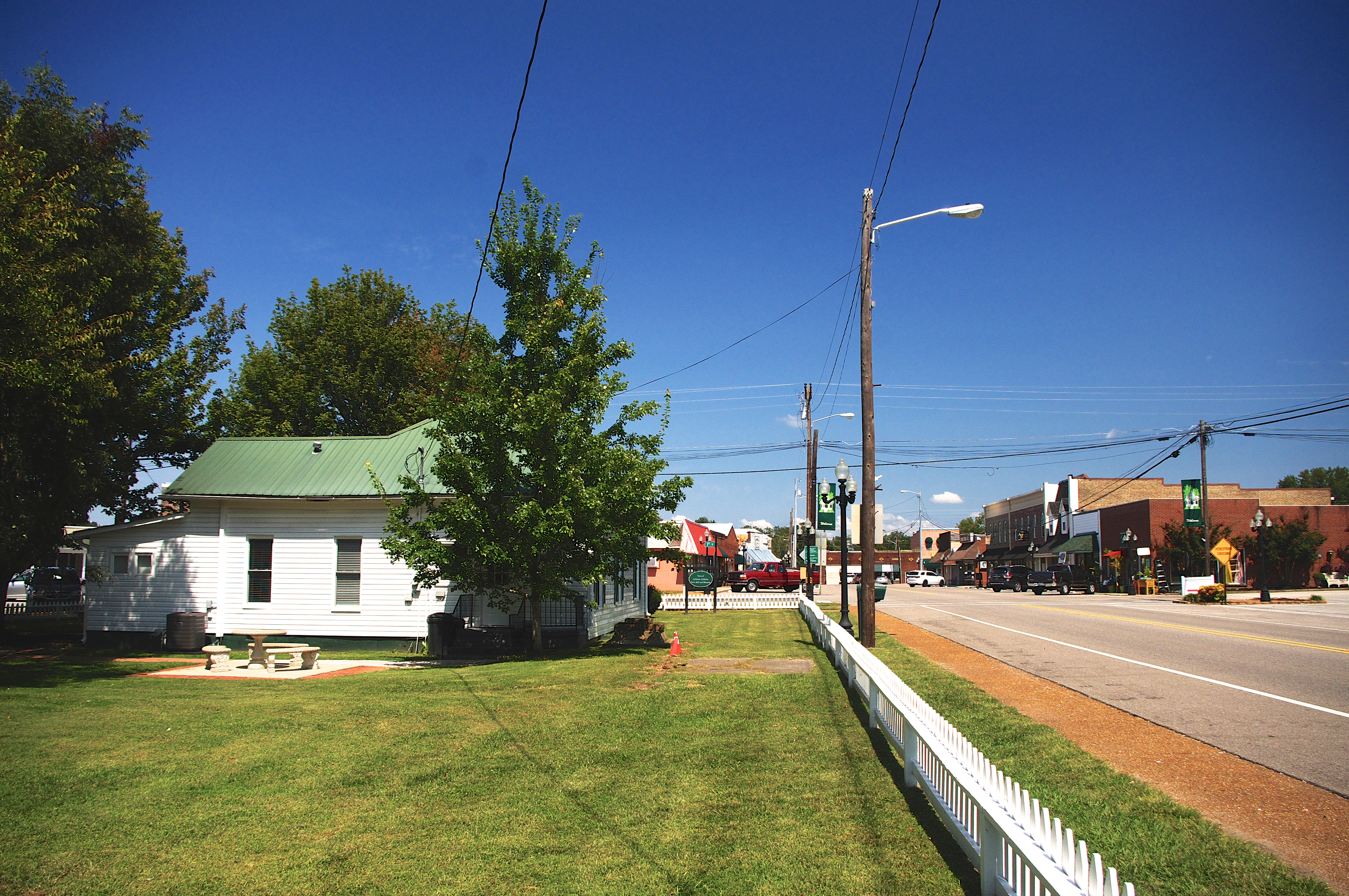
- View along Ardmore Avenue (SR 53); Town Hall on the left

- Location of Ardmore in Limestone County, Alabama
- Coordinates: 34°59′05″N 86°50′14″W
- Country: United States
- State: Alabama
- County: Limestone
- Founded: 1922
- Incorporated: February 24, 1945

Area
  - Total: 2.050 sq mi (5.310 km^{2})
  - Land: 2.042 sq mi (5.290 km^{2})
  - Water: 0.0085 sq mi (0.022 km^{2})
- Elevation: 912 ft (278 m)

Population (2020)
  - Total: 1,321
  - Estimate (2022): 1,393 ▲
  - Density: 646.8/sq mi (249.7/km^{2})
- Time zone: UTC−6 (Central (CST))
  - Summer (DST): UTC−5 (CDT)
- ZIP Code: 35739
- Area codes: 256 and 938
- FIPS code: 01-02260
- GNIS feature ID: 2405163
- Website: townofardmorealabama.com

Ardmore is a town in northeastern Limestone County, Alabama, United States, and is included in the Huntsville-Decatur Metro Area. The population was 1,321 at the 2020 census, It borders its sister city Ardmore, Tennessee.

== History ==
The settlement was originally named Austin, after Alex Austin, who selected the location as a site for a station along the Louisville and Nashville Railroad. The railroad company later renamed the town Ardmore, for the community of Ardmore, Pennsylvania. Ardmore, Alabama was incorporated in 1922.

== Geography ==
Ardmore is the northernmost settlement in Alabama. The town is concentrated along Alabama State Route 53, which runs south to north along Ardmore Avenue before veering east along the state line, where it runs congruent with Tennessee State Route 7 on Main Street. Interstate 65, which connects Nashville and Birmingham, passes just west of Ardmore.

Main Street is the state line. The road heading northbound/westbound is in Tennessee, while southbound/eastbound is in Alabama.

According to the United States Census Bureau, the town has a total area of 2.050 square miles (5.31 km^{2}), of which 2.042 square miles (5.29 km^{2}) is land and 0.008 square miles (0.021 km^{2}), is water.

== Demographics ==
Historical population
Census	Pop.	Note	%±
1930	266		—
1940	381		43.2%
1950	408		7.1%
1960	439		7.6%
1970	761		73.3%
1980	1,096		44.0%
1990	1,090		−0.5%
2000	1,034		−5.1%
2010	1,194		15.5%
2020	1,321		10.6%
2022 (est.)	1,393	▲	5.5%
U.S. Decennial Census; 2020 Census

Ardmore first appeared on the 1930 U.S. Census as an incorporated town.

=== Racial and ethnic composition ===
Census Year	Population & Racial Majority	State Place Rank	County Place Rank	White (White, Non- Hispanic 1980-	Black	Hispanic (1980-	Native American	Asian	Pacific Islander (1980-	Other	2 or More Races (2000-
1930 (Note: 1st year Ardmore reported on census)	266 (-) (Note: (-)Indicates no immediate prior population figure or rank) (Note: Racial demographics not reported for places of less than 1,000 on the 1930-70 censuses.)	248th (-)	2nd (-)								
1940	381 ↑	219th ↑	2nd X (Note: X Indicates no change in rank)								
1950	408 ↑	260th (Note: Tied for 260th place with Pine Hill) ↓	2nd X								
1960	439 ↑	259th ↑	2nd X								
1970	761 ↑	238th ↑	2nd X								
1980 (Note: With addition of "Hispanic" to census, which could also be a person of any race, both population totals and percentages will add up to more than the total population.)	1,096 ↑	238th X	2nd X	1,073 ↑ 97.9% (Note: From 1980 onwards, White population only reported on chart as "Non-Hispanic White/One Race", which will be less than the overall White population that would also include White Hispanics, which would be counted under Hispanic exclusively.)	8 (-) 0.7%	10 (-) 0.9%	2 (-) 0.2%	2 (-) 0.2%		1 (-) 0.1%	
1990	1,090 ↓	250th ↓	2nd X	1,065 ↓ 97.7%	18 ↑ 1.7%	6 ↓ 0.6%	1 ↓ 0.1%				
2000	1,034 ↓	277th ↓	2nd X	988 ↓ 95.6%	9 ↓ 0.9%	18 ↑ 1.7%	5 ↑ 0.5%	8 (-) 0.8%	1 (-) 0.1%	12 (-) 1.2%	4 (-) 0.4%
2010	1,194 ↑	282nd ↓	4th (Note: Lost 2nd place to Madison & Huntsville (3rd), both of which have annexed from the adjacent Madison County. Ardmore, however, remains 2nd largest place wholly within Limestone County.) ↓	1,119 ↑ 93.7%	23 ↑ 1.9%	16 ↓ 1.3%	9 ↑ 0.8%	11 ↑ 0.9%	1 X 0.1%	7 ↓ 0.6%	17 ↑ 1.4%

Ardmore town, Alabama – Racial and ethnic composition Note: the US Census treats Hispanic/Latino as an ethnic category. This table excludes Latinos from the racial categories and assigns them to a separate category. Hispanics/Latinos may be of any race. Race and ethnicity were not surveyed for populations under 2,500 in 1980 and under 1,000 in 1990.
Race / Ethnicity (NH = Non-Hispanic)	Pop 1990	Pop 2000	Pop 2010	Pop 2020	% 1990	% 2000	% 2010	% 2020
White alone (NH)	1,065	988	1,119	1,144	97.71%	95.55%	93.72%	86.60%
Black or African American alone (NH)	18	9	23	33	1.65%	0.87%	1.93%	2.50%
Native American or Alaska Native alone (NH)	1	5	9	4	0.09%	0.48%	0.75%	0.30%
Asian alone (NH)	0	8	11	8	0.00%	0.77%	0.92%	0.61%
Native Hawaiian or Pacific Islander alone (NH)	x	1	1	0	x	0.10%	0.08%	0.00%
Other race alone (NH)	0	1	0	1	0.00%	0.10%	0.00%	0.08%
Mixed race or Multiracial (NH)	x	4	15	75	x	0.39%	1.26%	5.68%
Hispanic or Latino (any race)	6	18	16	56	0.55%	1.74%	1.34%	4.24%
Total	1,090	1,034	1,194	1,321	100.00%	100.00%	100.00%	100.00%

=== 2020 census ===
As of the 2020 census, there were 1,321 people, 571 households, and 344 families residing in the town.

The median age was 39.3 years. 22.4% of residents were under the age of 18 and 20.5% of residents were 65 years of age or older. For every 100 females there were 86.1 males, and for every 100 females age 18 and over there were 84.7 males age 18 and over.

0.0% of residents lived in urban areas, while 100.0% lived in rural areas.

Of the 571 households, 32.2% had children under the age of 18 living in them. Of all households, 40.5% were married-couple households, 17.9% were households with a male householder and no spouse or partner present, and 36.6% were households with a female householder and no spouse or partner present. About 34.0% of all households were made up of individuals and 19.1% had someone living alone who was 65 years of age or older.

There were 636 housing units, of which 10.2% were vacant. The homeowner vacancy rate was 3.2% and the rental vacancy rate was 3.5%.

=== 2010 census ===
As of the 2010 census there were 1,194 people, 505 households, and 333 families in the town. The population density was 517 inhabitants per square mile (200/km^{2}). There were 578 housing units at an average density of 289 per square mile (112/km^{2}). The racial makeup of the town was 94.3% White, 1.9% Black or African American, 0.8% Native American, 0.9% Asian, 0.1% Pacific Islander, 0.6% from other races, and 1.4% from two or more races. 1.3%. were Hispanic or Latino of any race.

Of the 505 households 28.1% had children under the age of 18 living with them, 44.8% were married couples living together, 15.4% had a female householder with no husband present, and 34.1% were non-families. 31.5% of households were made up of individuals, and 18.5% were one person aged 65 or older. The average household size was 2.36, and the average family size was 2.97.

The age distribution was 24.9% under the age of 18, 10.7% from 18 to 24, 25.7% from 25 to 44, 21.9% from 45 to 64, and 16.8% 65 or older. The median age was 37.1 years. For every 100 females, there were 82.3 males. For every 100 females age 18 and over, there were 90.7 males.

The median household income was $32,196 and the median family income was $36,779. Males had a median income of $31,600 versus $37,841 for females. The per capita income for the town was $18,931. About 13.0% of families and 18.8% of the population were below the poverty line, including 21.9% of those under age 18 and 19.2% of those age 65 or over.

=== 2000 census ===
As of the 2000 census, there were 1,034 people, 460 households, and 276 families in the town. The population density was 506.8 inhabitants per square mile (195.7/km^{2}). There were 506 housing units at an average density of 248.0 per square mile (95.8/km^{2}). The racial makeup of the town was 96.23% White, 0.87% Black or African American, 0.48% Native American, 0.77% Asian, 0.10% Pacific Islander, 1.16% from other races, and 0.39% from two or more races. 1.74% were Hispanic or Latino of any race.

Of the 460 households 27.0% had children under the age of 18 living with them, 43.0% were married couples living together, 11.5% had a female householder with no husband present, and 39.8% were non-families. 36.5% of households were made up of individuals, and 21.1% were one person aged 65 or older. The average household size was 2.25, and the average family size was 2.96.

The age distribution was 25.0% under the age of 18, 8.3% from 18 to 24, 25.7% from 25 to 44, 24.6% from 45 to 64, and 16.4% 65 or older. The median age was 37 years. For every 100 females, there were 81.4 males. For every 100 females age 18 and over, there were 78.0 males.

The median household income was $28,352 and the median family income was $40,673. Males had a median income of $29,531 versus $19,875 for females. The per capita income for the town was $18,447. About 10.7% of families and 17.9% of the population were below the poverty line, including 20.2% of those under age 18 and 30.7% of those age 65 or over.

== Education ==
Ardmore is in the Limestone County School District.

There is a high school in Ardmore, Alabama called “Ardmore High School” and it has around 1,008 students. The high school consists of two separate parts: the middle school, where grades six through eight attend, and the high school, where grades nine through twelve attend. The school was founded in 1915; the five acres of land cost a total of five dollars and was generously donated to the school. Residents of Ardmore helped construct the school building for an entire year. The original school building was only two stories tall. There were classrooms, a library, and a study hall area on the first floor, and they put a stage on the second floor of the building.

In 1917, the doors of the school opened to welcome its first students. Ten years later, Ardmore High School received its accreditation.

The school's mission statement is: "The mission and purpose of Ardmore High School is to provide appropriate learning opportunities that promote academic, physical, and ethical growth of students enabling them to become productive citizens in an ever-changing society."

== Notable people ==
- David Fanning, country music singer, songwriter, and record producer
- Lee Hodges, PGA Tour golfer

== Photo Gallery ==
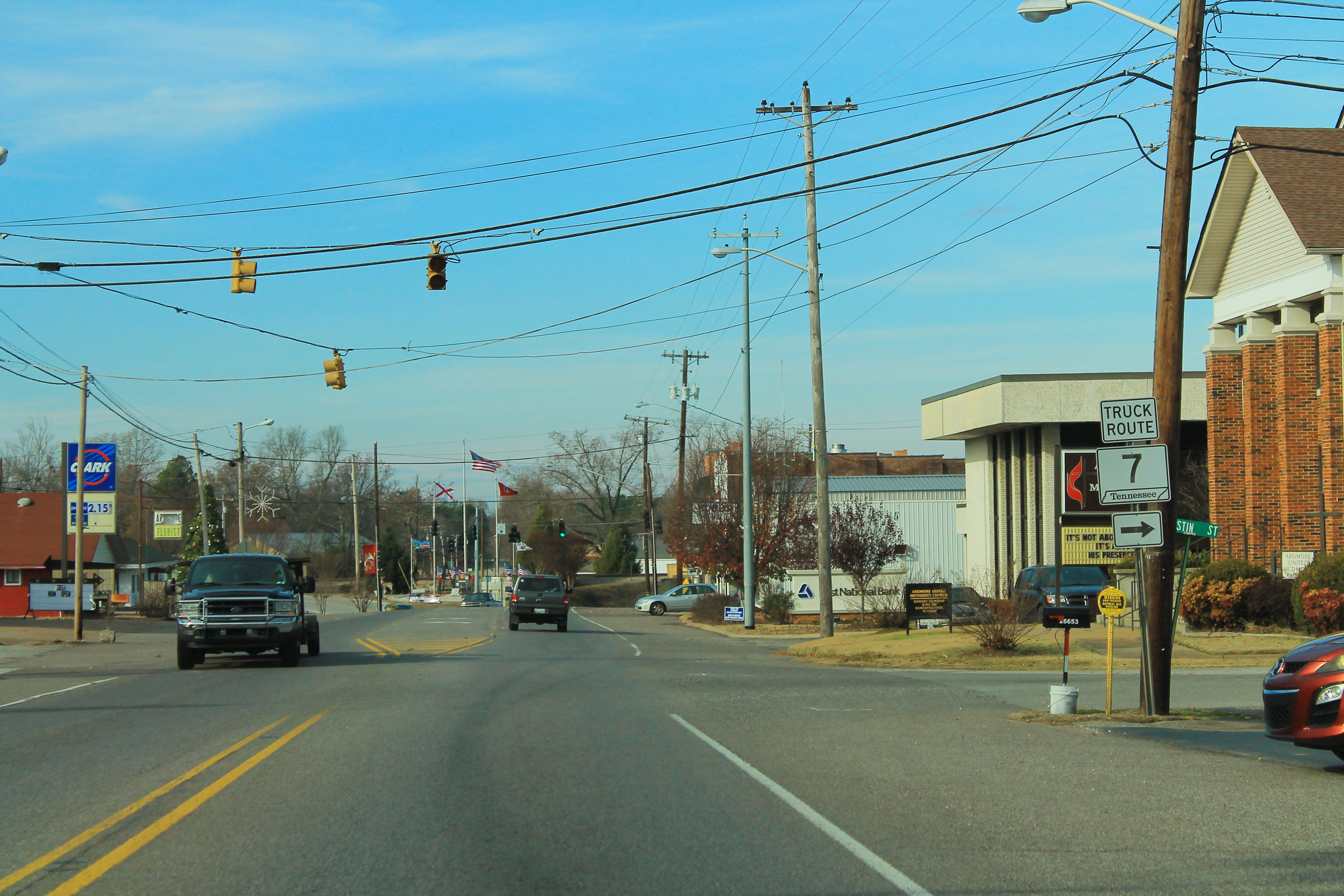
Ardmore road signs at the state line

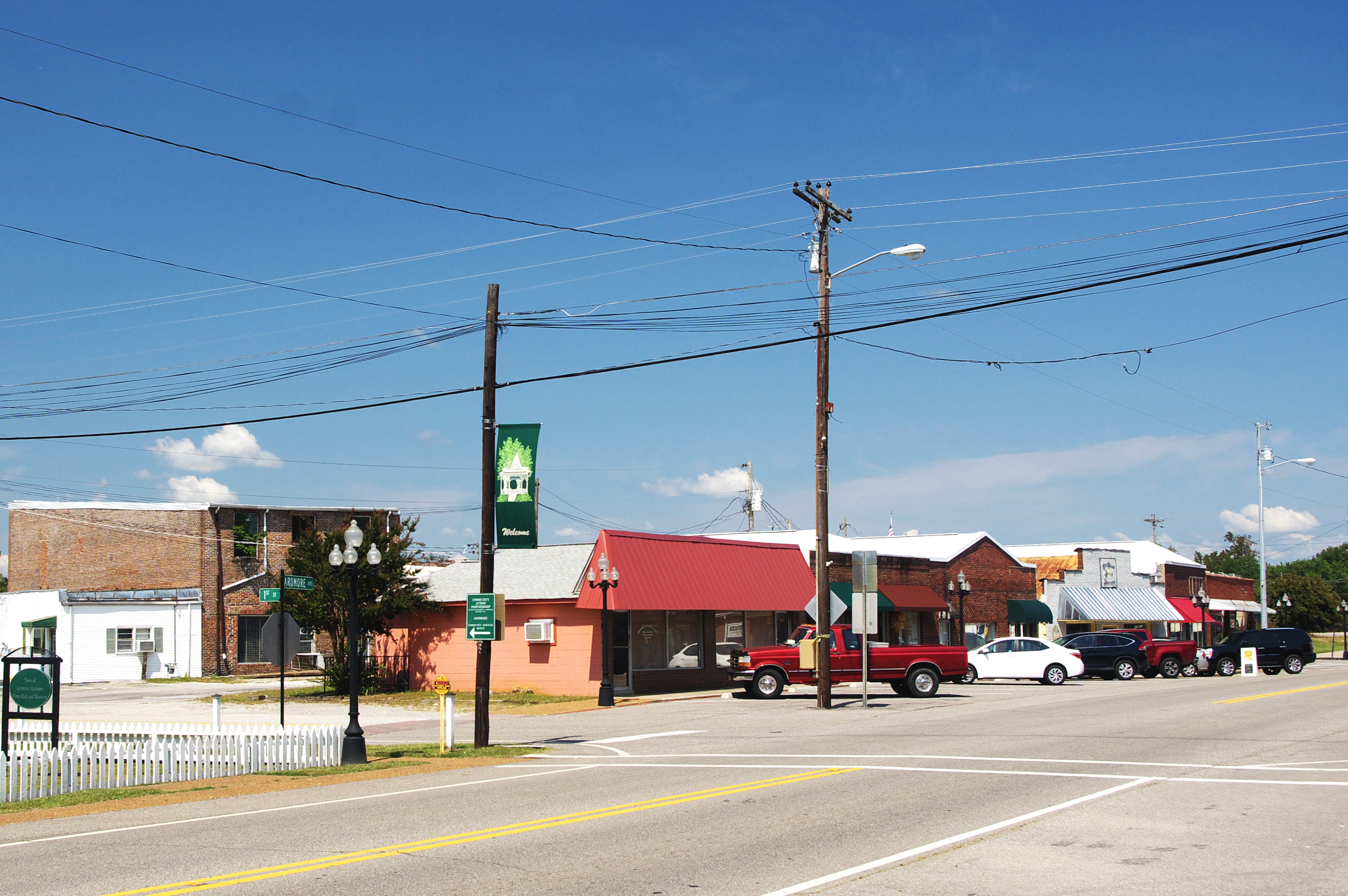
Downtown Ardmore

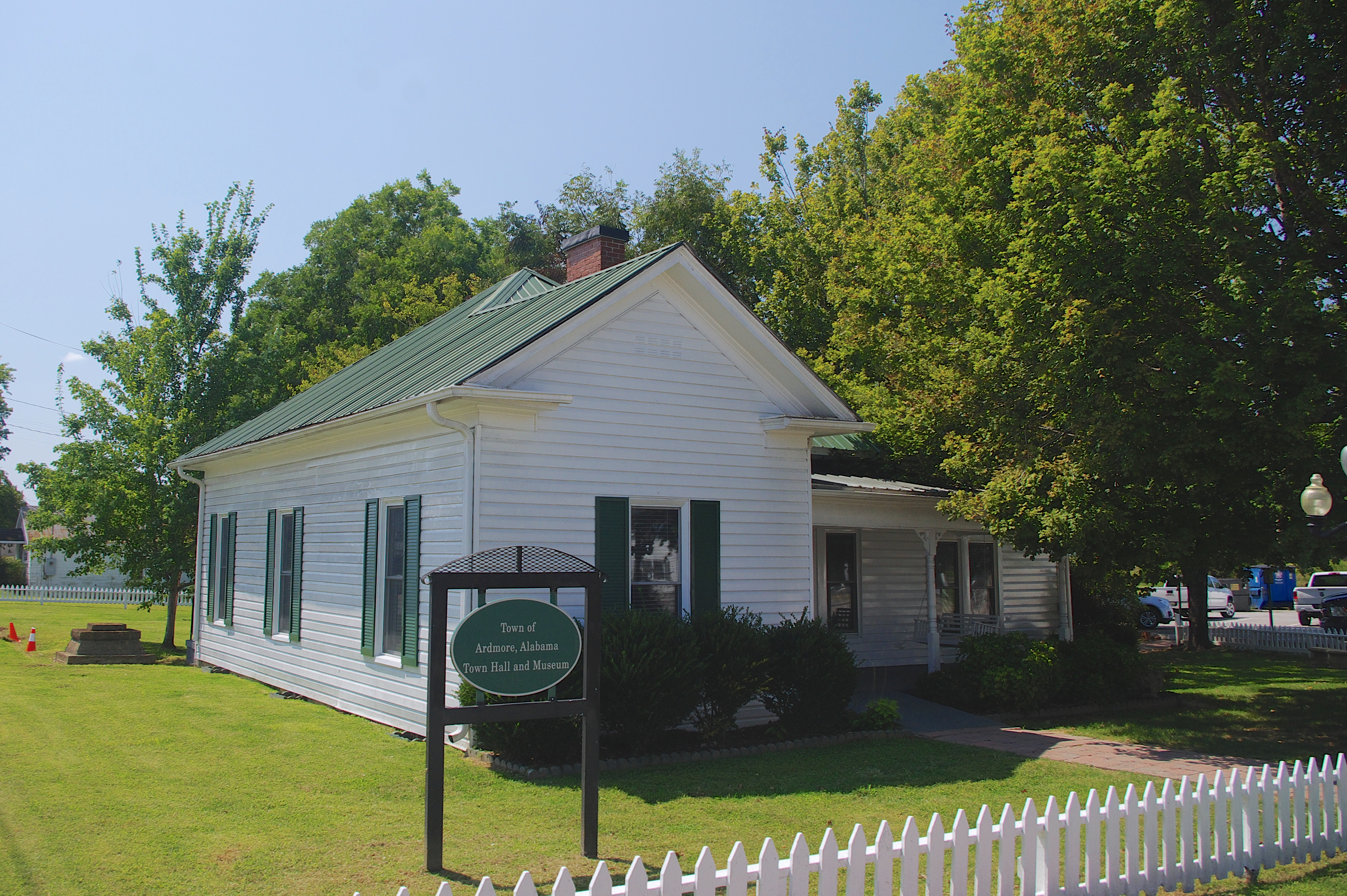
Ardmore town hall

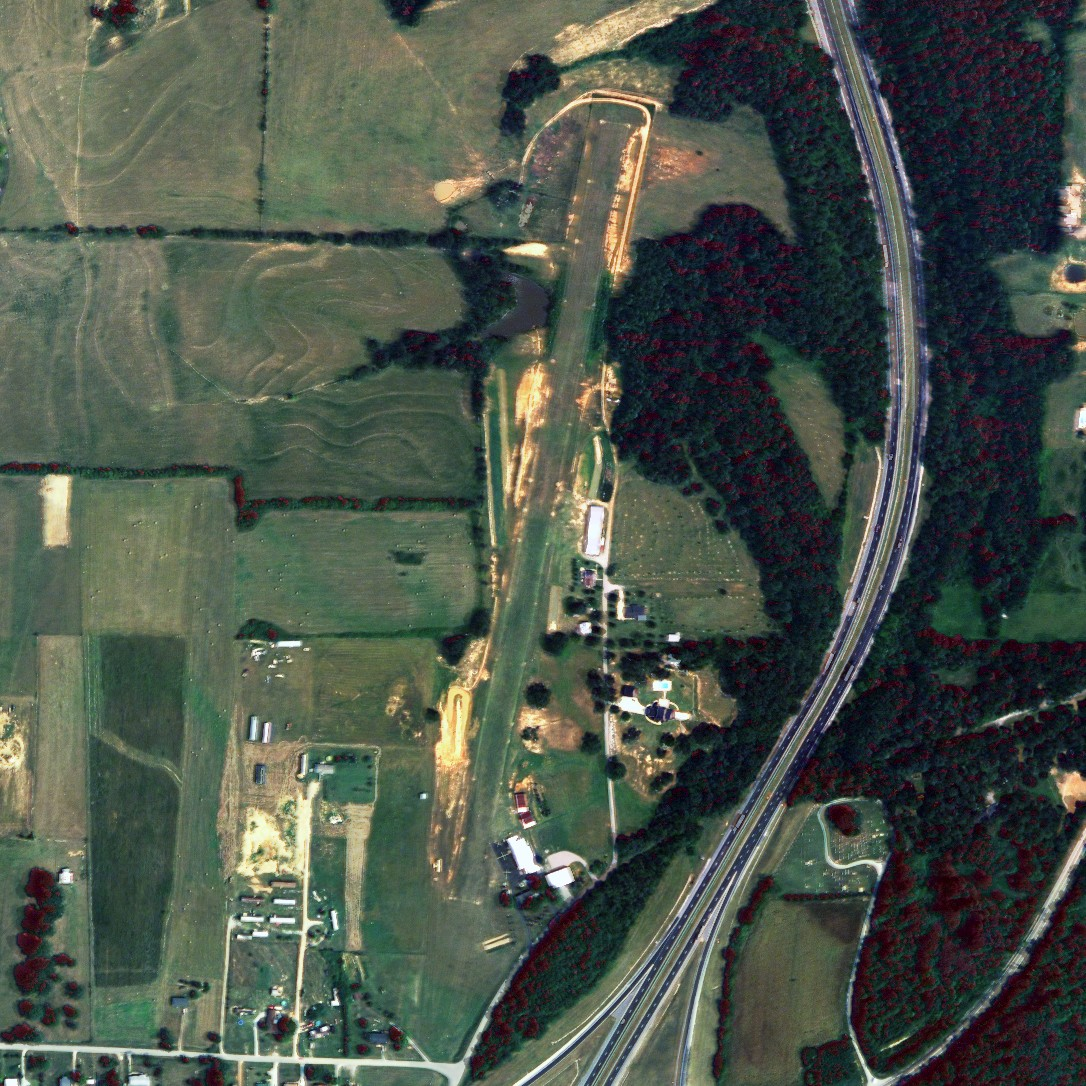
Ardmore airport
