= Prospect, Giles County, Tennessee =

Prospect
- Unincorporated community
- Location within Tennessee Location within the United States
- Coordinates: 35.0293°N 87.003°W
- Country: United States
- State: Tennessee
- County: Giles County
- ZIP code: 38477

Prospect is an unincorporated community in Giles County, Tennessee. The zip code is 38477.

The southern agricultural pioneer and publisher Cully Cobb was born in Prospect in 1884.
