= Ardmore, Tennessee =

- City
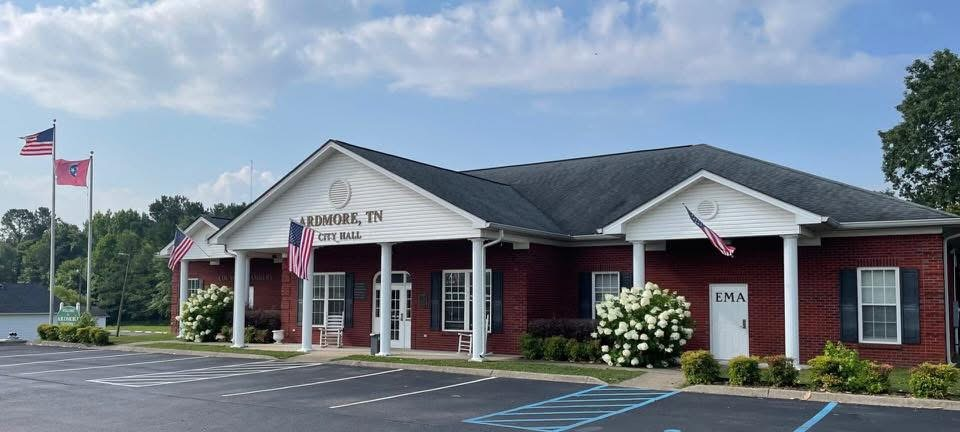
- City Hall on Main Street

- Location in Giles County, Tennessee
- Coordinates: 34°59′31″N 86°50′48″W
- Country: United States
- State: Tennessee
- Counties: Giles, Lincoln
- Founded: 1911
- Incorporated: 1949

Government
  - Mayor: Mike Magnusson
  - City Council – Alderman: Garon Hargrove; Wayne Harvell; Ken Crosson; Spencer Smith; Jason Sherman; Joe Stagner
  - City Boards: Vacant (coming soon)
  - City Attorney: Tim Underwood

Area
  - Total: 4.705 sq mi (12.186 km^{2})
  - Land: 4.698 sq mi (12.167 km^{2})
  - Water: 0.0069 sq mi (0.018 km^{2})
- Elevation: 890 ft (270 m)

Population (2020)
  - Total: 1,217
  - Estimate (2022): 1,219 ▲
  - Density: 259.1/sq mi (100.0/km^{2})
- Time zone: UTC−6 (Central (CST))
  - Summer (DST): UTC−5 (CDT)
- ZIP Code: 38449
- Area code: 931
- FIPS code: 47-01640
- GNIS feature ID: 1304866
- Website: cityofardmoretn.com

Ardmore is a city in Giles and Lincoln counties, Tennessee, United States. The population was 1,217 at the 2020 census. Ardmore is the site of a Tennessee Department of Tourist Development Welcome Center. It borders its sister city, Ardmore, Alabama.

== History ==
Ardmore began in 1911 as a railroad stop named "Austin" after a store owner, Alex Austin, who served construction crews working on the nearby L&N Railroad (now CSX) line that would connect Nashville, Tennessee, and Decatur, Alabama. When the L&N opened a depot in 1914, it changed the town's name to "Ardmore." The name was likely inspired by Ardmore, Pennsylvania. Ardmore, Tennessee, incorporated in 1949.

== Geography ==
Ardmore is located at 34°59′31″N 86°50′48″W (34.9920292, -86.8466694). The city is concentrated along Tennessee State Route 7 (Main Street), which runs congruent with Alabama State Route 53 along the state line before veering northwestward to its intersection with Interstate 65 and U.S. Route 31 in the western part of the city. US 31 connects Ardmore with Elkton, Tennessee, which lies to the northwest, and Tennessee State Route 110 connects Ardmore with Fayetteville to the northeast. Ardmore is the southern terminus of U.S. Bicycle Route 23.

According to the United States Census Bureau, the city has a total area of 4.705 square miles (12.19 km^{2}), of which 4.698 square miles (12.17 km^{2}) is land and 0.007 square miles (0.018 km^{2}), is water. Ardmore's business district is located primarily in Giles County, though the eastern parts of the city are located in Lincoln County. The Elk River passes northwest of Ardmore.

=== Climate ===
Climate data for Ardmore, Tennessee, 1991–2020 normals, extremes 2008–2020
Month	Jan	Feb	Mar	Apr	May	Jun	Jul	Aug	Sep	Oct	Nov	Dec	Year
Record high °F (°C)	76 (24)	81 (27)	85 (29)	89 (32)	96 (36)	102 (39)	102 (39)	100 (38)	99 (37)	96 (36)	88 (31)	78 (26)	102 (39)
Mean daily maximum °F (°C)	51.9 (11.1)	57.4 (14.1)	66.1 (18.9)	75.0 (23.9)	81.5 (27.5)	87.7 (30.9)	90.8 (32.7)	90.5 (32.5)	85.3 (29.6)	76.3 (24.6)	64.8 (18.2)	55.1 (12.8)	73.5 (23.1)
Daily mean °F (°C)	40.9 (4.9)	45.1 (7.3)	53.1 (11.7)	61.7 (16.5)	70.0 (21.1)	77.2 (25.1)	80.5 (26.9)	79.3 (26.3)	73.5 (23.1)	62.9 (17.2)	51.8 (11.0)	43.9 (6.6)	61.7 (16.5)
Mean daily minimum °F (°C)	29.9 (−1.2)	32.7 (0.4)	40.0 (4.4)	48.3 (9.1)	58.4 (14.7)	66.7 (19.3)	70.1 (21.2)	68.0 (20.0)	61.7 (16.5)	49.4 (9.7)	38.7 (3.7)	32.7 (0.4)	49.7 (9.9)
Record low °F (°C)	3 (−16)	6 (−14)	16 (−9)	29 (−2)	38 (3)	51 (11)	55 (13)	56 (13)	45 (7)	27 (−3)	17 (−8)	12 (−11)	3 (−16)
Average precipitation inches (mm)	4.77 (121)	5.39 (137)	5.44 (138)	5.10 (130)	3.82 (97)	4.90 (124)	4.92 (125)	3.57 (91)	3.54 (90)	3.22 (82)	4.01 (102)	7.00 (178)	55.68 (1,415)
Source 1: NOAA
Source 2: XMACIS2

== Demographics ==
Historical population
Census	Pop.	Note	%±
1950	157		—
1960	195		24.2%
1970	601		208.2%
1980	835		38.9%
1990	866		3.7%
2000	1,082		24.9%
2010	1,213		12.1%
2020	1,217		0.3%
2022 (est.)	1,219		0.2%
U.S. Decennial Census; 2020 Census

=== 2020 census ===
Racial composition as of the 2020 census
Race	Number	Percent
White	1,106	90.9%
Black or African American	35	2.9%
American Indian and Alaska Native	1	0.1%
Asian	8	0.7%
Native Hawaiian and Other Pacific Islander	1	0.1%
Some other race	3	0.2%
Two or more races	63	5.2%
Hispanic or Latino (of any race)	36	3.0%

As of the 2020 census, there was a population of 1,217, with 514 households and 330 families residing in the city.

As of the 2020 census, the median age was 48.7 years; 20.0% of residents were under the age of 18 and 24.2% were 65 years of age or older. For every 100 females there were 92.0 males, and for every 100 females age 18 and over there were 91.9 males age 18 and over.

As of the 2020 census, 0.0% of residents lived in urban areas, while 100.0% lived in rural areas.

Of the 514 households in Ardmore, 27.4% had children under the age of 18 living in them, 44.0% were married-couple households, 19.8% were households with a male householder and no spouse or partner present, and 30.5% were households with a female householder and no spouse or partner present. About 32.1% of all households were made up of individuals and 13.3% had someone living alone who was 65 years of age or older.

As of the 2020 census, there were 547 housing units, of which 6.0% were vacant. The homeowner vacancy rate was 2.0% and the rental vacancy rate was 1.7%.

=== 2000 census ===
As of the 2000 census, there was a population of 1,082, with 427 households and 306 families residing in the city. The population density was 238.6 inhabitants per square mile (92.1/km^{2}). There were 480 housing units at an average density of 105.8 per square mile (40.8/km^{2}). The racial makeup of the city was 96.86% White, 1.76% African American, 0.65% Native American, 0.09% Asian, 0.37% from other races, and 0.28% from two or more races. Hispanic or Latino of any race were 1.39% of the population.

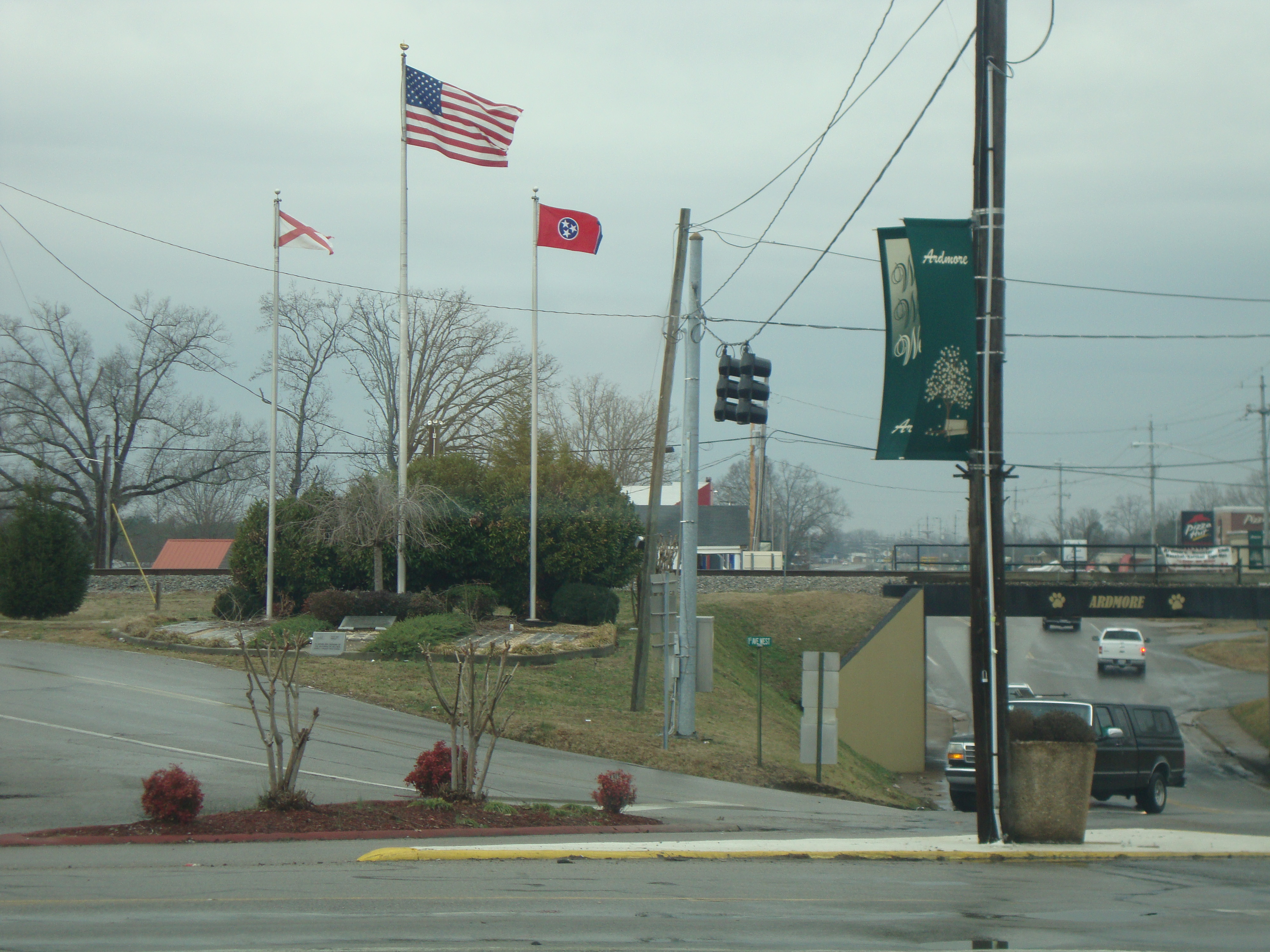
Ardmore Veterans Memorial, with the U.S. flag and state flags of Alabama and Tennessee

There were 427 households, out of which 31.1% had children under the age of 18 living with them, 55.7% were married couples living together, 12.9% had a female householder with no husband present, and 28.3% were non-families. 26.7% of all households were made up of individuals, and 14.3% had someone living alone who was 65 years of age or older. The average household size was 2.35 and the average family size was 2.82.

In the city, the population was spread out, with 22.6% under the age of 18, 5.9% from 18 to 24, 26.3% from 25 to 44, 23.9% from 45 to 64, and 21.3% who were 65 years of age or older. The median age was 40 years. For every 100 females, there were 82.2 males. For every 100 females age 18 and over, there were 77.2 males.

The median income for a household in the city was $33,571, and the median income for a family was $40,329. Males had a median income of $35,486 versus $25,391 for females. The per capita income for the city was $18,047. About 11.5% of families and 14.5% of the population were below the poverty line, including 21.5% of those under age 18 and 21.0% of those age 65 or over.
