= Taft, Tennessee =

- Unincorporated community
- Location within Tennessee Location within the United States
- Coordinates: 35°01′14″N 86°43′05″W
- Country: United States
- State: Tennessee
- County: Lincoln

Area
  - Total: 3.59 sq mi (9.30 km^{2})
  - Land: 3.59 sq mi (9.30 km^{2})
  - Water: 0 sq mi (0.00 km^{2})
- Elevation: 899 ft (274 m)

Population (2020)
  - Total: 256
  - Density: 71.3/sq mi (27.51/km^{2})
- Time zone: UTC-6 (Central (CST))
  - Summer (DST): UTC-5 (CDT)
- ZIP code: 38488
- Area code: 931
- GNIS feature ID: 1272039

Taft is an unincorporated community in Lincoln County, Tennessee, United States. The community has a post office with ZIP code 38488. Taft is located at the intersection of State Route 110 (Ardmore Highway) and State Route 274 (Old Railroad Bed Road).

== Demographics ==
Historical population
Census	Pop.	Note	%±
2020	256		—
U.S. Decennial Census
