= Alabama State Route 53 =

State highway in Alabama, United States

State Route 53
- Standalone sections of SR 53 highlighted in red

Route information
- Maintained by ALDOT
- Length: 345.287 mi (555.686 km) Most of length signed as US 231

Southern standalone section
- Length: 20.137 mi (32.407 km)
- South end: SR 71 towards Marianna, Fla.
- North end: US 231 Bus. / US 431 Bus. at Dothan

Northern standalone section
- Length: 28.423 mi (45.742 km)
- South end: US 231 / US 431 in Huntsville
- Major intersections: I-565 in Huntsville
- North end: I-65 / US 31 near Ardmore

Location
- Country: United States
- State: Alabama
- Counties: Houston, Dale, Coffee, Pike, Montgomery, Elmore, Coosa, Talladega, Shelby, St. Clair, Blount, Cullman, Marshall, Morgan, Madison, Limestone

Highway system
- Alabama State Highway System; Interstate; US; State
← SR 52	→ SR 54

State Route 53 (SR 53) is a 345.287-mile (555.686 km) state highway in the U.S. state of Alabama. The majority, between Dothan and Huntsville, is signed as U.S. Route 231 (US 231), but the two ends – south to Florida and north to I-65/US 31 near Tennessee – are independent. In those areas, US 231 uses SR 1, sharing the route with US 431 north of Huntsville, where it is referred to as Memorial Parkway.

An 18-mile-long (29 km) stretch of SR 53, from Research Park Boulevard in Huntsville to just south of Ardmore, is designated as the "Paul Luther Bolden Memorial Highway" in honor of Paul L. Bolden, a Medal of Honor recipient and Madison County's most-decorated World War II veteran.

== Route description ==
Beginning at its southern terminus at SR 71, SR 53 assumes a slight northwesterly trajectory as it travels through Dothan, where it joins US 231, heading towards Montgomery. Between Dothan and Huntsville, SR 53 is the unsigned partner to US 231, however, only SR-53’s mile markers are present along the route.

At Huntsville, SR 53 diverts from US 231 and once again becomes a signed route until it reaches its northern terminus just west of Ardmore at I-65/US 31 crossing several major roads along the way including University and Sparkman Drives in Huntsville. The northbound lane of SR 53 actually enters Tennessee before going south to I-65. Tennessee State Route 7 travels concurrently with SR 53 on the state line and both Alabama and Tennessee mile markers are present on the highway.

This route is the rest of Governor's Drive—US-431's right-of-way—in Huntsville, becoming Jordan Lane after its two-part junction with I-565, featuring Jordan Lane and Governor's Drive. Jordan Lane is AL-53's right-of-way until its northern terminus in Ardmore.

== Major intersections ==
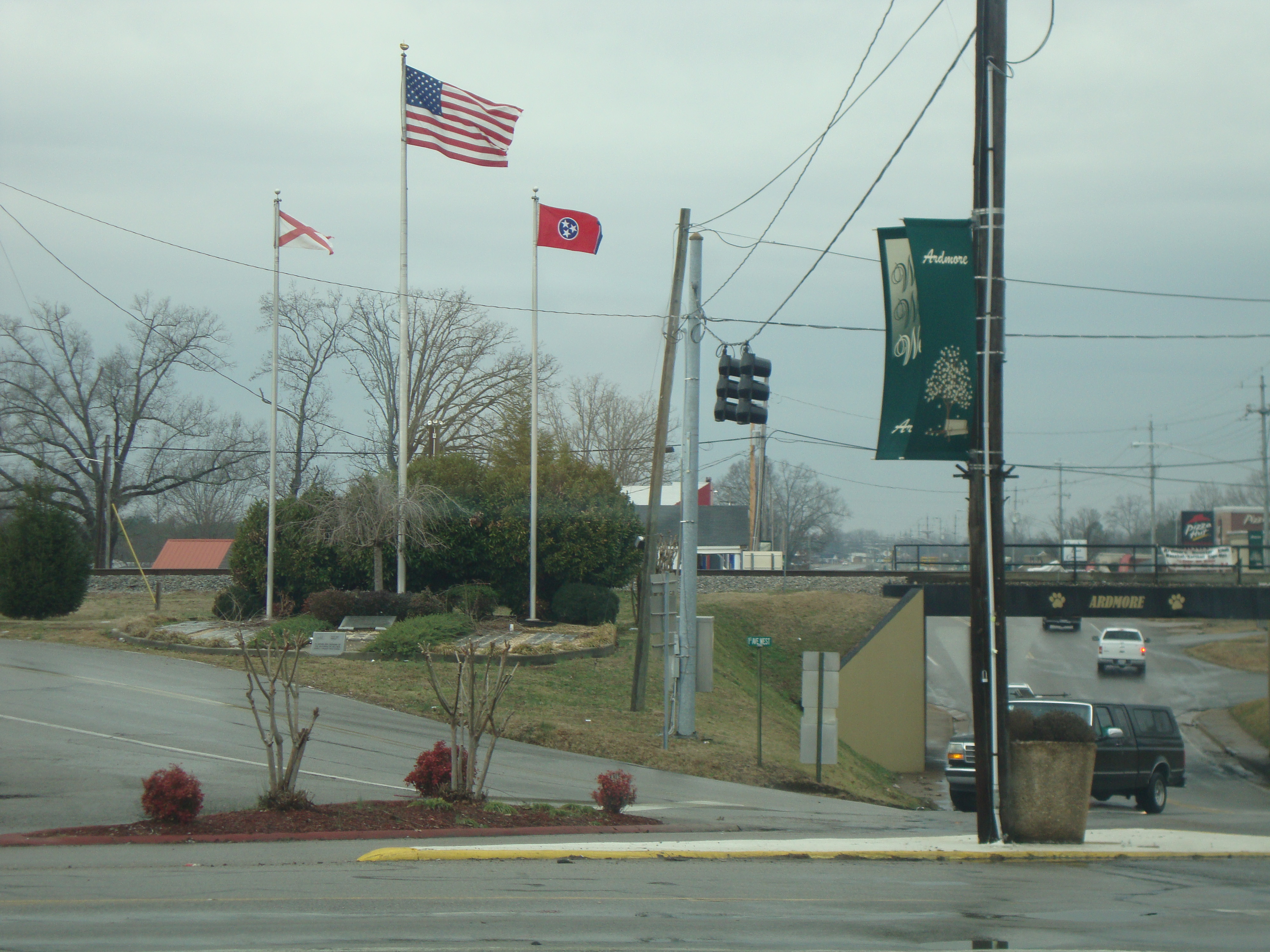
SR 53, coming in from the upper left, follows the Tennessee state line at Ardmore

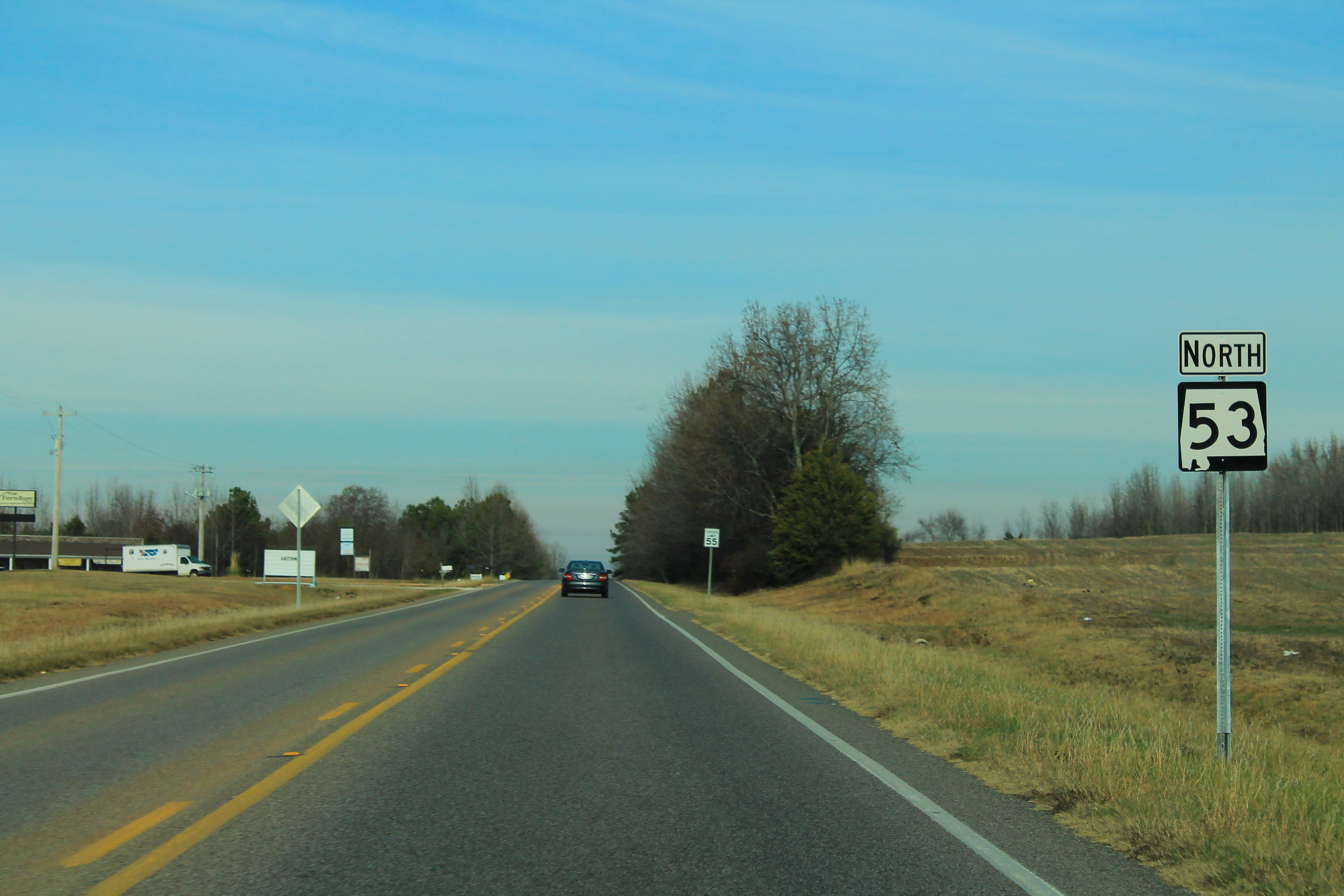
A sign denoting SR 53 in Toney

County	Location	mi	km	Destinations	Notes
Houston		0.000	0.000	SR 71 south – Marianna	Florida state line; southern terminus
Houston	Dothan	18.639	29.997	US 431 / SR 210 (Ross Clark Circle) to US 84 / US 231 south – Panama City, Enterprise, Ashford, Eufaula, Bainbridge	
Houston	Dothan	20.137	32.407	US 231 Bus. south / US 431 Bus. south (South Oates Street / SR 1) – Marianna, Panama City	Northern end of signed SR 53; southern end of US 231 Bus./US 431 Bus./SR 1 concurrency
Houston	Dothan	21.158	34.051	US 84 Bus. / SR 52 (Main Street / SR 12) – Dothan Civic Center	
Houston	Dothan	22.072	35.521	US 431 Bus. north (Reeves Street / SR 1) – Headland, Eufaula	Northern end of US 431 Bus./SR 1 concurrency
Houston	Dothan	24.007	38.636	US 231 south / SR 210 (Ross Clark Circle) to US 431 north / US 84 – Enterprise, Panama City, Headland, Eufaula, Rip Hewes Stadium	Northern terminus of US 231 Bus.; southern end of US 231 concurrency
SR 53 is the unsigned designation for US 231 for the next 292.857 miles (471.308 km)
Madison	Huntsville	316.864	509.943	US 231 north / US 431 (Memorial Parkway / Governors Drive / SR 1) to I-565 – Guntersville, Monte Sano State Park	Interchange; northern end of US 231 concurrency; southern end of signed SR 53
Madison	Huntsville	318.548	512.653	I-565 / US 72 Alt. to I-65 / Jordan Lane – Decatur, Botanical Garden	I-565 exit 17
Madison	Huntsville	319.915	514.853	US 72 (University Drive / SR 2) – Alabama A&M University	
Madison	Huntsville	324.449	522.150	SR 255 south (Research Park Boulevard) to US 72 / I-565 / MLK Boulevard	Interchange; northern terminus of SR 255
Limestone	Ardmore	340.87	548.58	SR 7 begins / Stateline Road	Southern end of (TN) SR 7 concurrency along Tennessee state line
Limestone	Ardmore	341.77	550.03	SR 110 east (Bowman Street) – Fayetteville	Western terminus of (TN) SR 110
Limestone	Ardmore	342.07	550.51	SR 7 Truck north (Austin Street)	Southern terminus of (TN) SR 7 Truck
Limestone	Ardmore	342.37	550.99	SR 7 north (Main Street west)	Northern end of (TN) SR 7 concurrency
Limestone	Ardmore	342.878	551.809	SR 251 south (Ardmore Avenue south)	Old US 31 south; northern terminus of SR 251
Limestone		345.287	555.686	I-65 (US 31) – Birmingham, Nashville	Northern terminus; I-65 exit 365; road continues south as Upper Elkton Road
1.000 mi = 1.609 km; 1.000 km = 0.621 mi: Concurrency terminus
