= Elkton, Tennessee =

- City
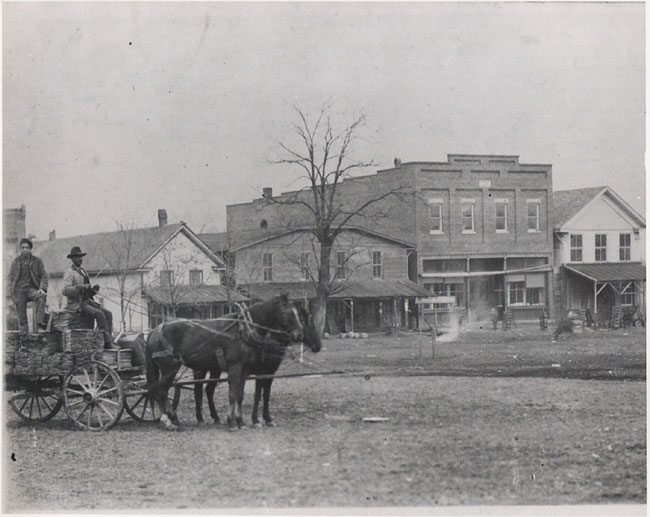
- Elkton in 1909

- Location of Elkton in Giles County, Tennessee.
- Coordinates: 35°3′46″N 86°53′53″W
- Country: United States
- State: Tennessee
- County: Giles
- Settled: 1808

Government
  - Mayor: Jim Caldwell
  - Vice Mayor: Bill Cary

Area
  - Total: 1.99 sq mi (5.16 km^{2})
  - Land: 1.99 sq mi (5.16 km^{2})
  - Water: 0 sq mi (0.00 km^{2})
- Elevation: 660 ft (200 m)

Population (2020)
  - Total: 545
  - Density: 273.6/sq mi (105.65/km^{2})
- Time zone: UTC-6 (Central (CST))
  - Summer (DST): UTC-5 (CDT)
- ZIP code: 38455
- Area code: 931
- FIPS code: 47-23660
- GNIS feature ID: 1283659
- Website: www.elktontn.com

Elkton is a city in Giles County, Tennessee, United States. As of the 2020 census, Elkton had a population of 545.

== Geography ==
Elkton is located in southeastern Giles County at 35°03′46″N 86°53′53″W. Most of the city is on the north bank of the Elk River, a southwest-flowing tributary of the Tennessee River.

U.S. Route 31 passes through the west side of the city, leading northwest 14 miles (23 km) to Pulaski, the Giles County seat, and south 5 miles (8 km) to Ardmore at the Alabama border. Interstate 65 passes just east of Elkton, with access from Exit 1 (US 31) south of town and from Exit 6 (State Route 273) at the north end of the city limits. I-65 leads north 81 miles (130 km) to Nashville and south 113 miles (182 km) to Birmingham, Alabama.

According to the United States Census Bureau, Elkton has a total area of 2.2 square miles (5.6 km^{2}), all land.

== Demographics ==
Historical population
Census	Pop.	Note	%±
1880	87		—
1890	165		89.7%
1910	179		—
1950	168		—
1960	199		18.5%
1970	341		71.4%
1980	540		58.4%
1990	448		−17.0%
2000	510		13.8%
2010	578		13.3%
2020	545		−5.7%

=== 2020 census ===
As of the 2020 census, Elkton had a population of 545. The median age was 44.5 years. 24.6% of residents were under the age of 18 and 18.0% of residents were 65 years of age or older.

For every 100 females there were 96.8 males, and for every 100 females age 18 and over there were 90.3 males age 18 and over.

0.0% of residents lived in urban areas, while 100.0% lived in rural areas.

There were 212 households in Elkton, of which 33.5% had children under the age of 18 living in them. Of all households, 47.6% were married-couple households, 17.5% were households with a male householder and no spouse or partner present, and 27.8% were households with a female householder and no spouse or partner present. About 27.8% of all households were made up of individuals and 12.3% had someone living alone who was 65 years of age or older.

There were 246 housing units, of which 13.8% were vacant. The homeowner vacancy rate was 2.3% and the rental vacancy rate was 11.8%.

Racial composition as of the 2020 census
Race	Number	Percent
White	386	70.8%
Black or African American	127	23.3%
American Indian and Alaska Native	1	0.2%
Asian	11	2.0%
Native Hawaiian and Other Pacific Islander	0	0.0%
Some other race	0	0.0%
Two or more races	20	3.7%
Hispanic or Latino (of any race)	4	0.7%

=== 2000 census ===
As of the 2000 census, there was a population of 510, with 203 households and 142 families residing in the city. The population density was 340.6 inhabitants per square mile (131.5/km^{2}). There were 226 housing units at an average density of 150.9 per square mile (58.3/km^{2}). The racial makeup of the city was 64.51% White, 35.10% African American and 0.39% Native American.

There were 203 households, out of which 26.1% had children under the age of 18 living with them, 50.2% were married couples living together, 14.8% had a female householder with no husband present, and 29.6% were non-families. 26.1% of all households were made up of individuals, and 10.3% had someone living alone who was 65 years of age or older. The average household size was 2.51 and the average family size was 3.01.

In the city, the population was spread out, with 22.0% under the age of 18, 9.0% from 18 to 24, 28.2% from 25 to 44, 27.6% from 45 to 64, and 13.1% who were 65 years of age or older. The median age was 40 years. For every 100 females, there were 100.0 males. For every 100 females age 18 and over, there were 87.7 males.

The median income for a household in the city was $28,281, and the median income for a family was $36,250. Males had a median income of $21,953 versus $21,583 for females. The per capita income for the city was $12,993. About 12.5% of families and 18.3% of the population were below the poverty line, including 26.4% of those under age 18 and 8.4% of those age 65 or over.
