= Lincoln County, Tennessee =

County in Tennessee, United States

- County
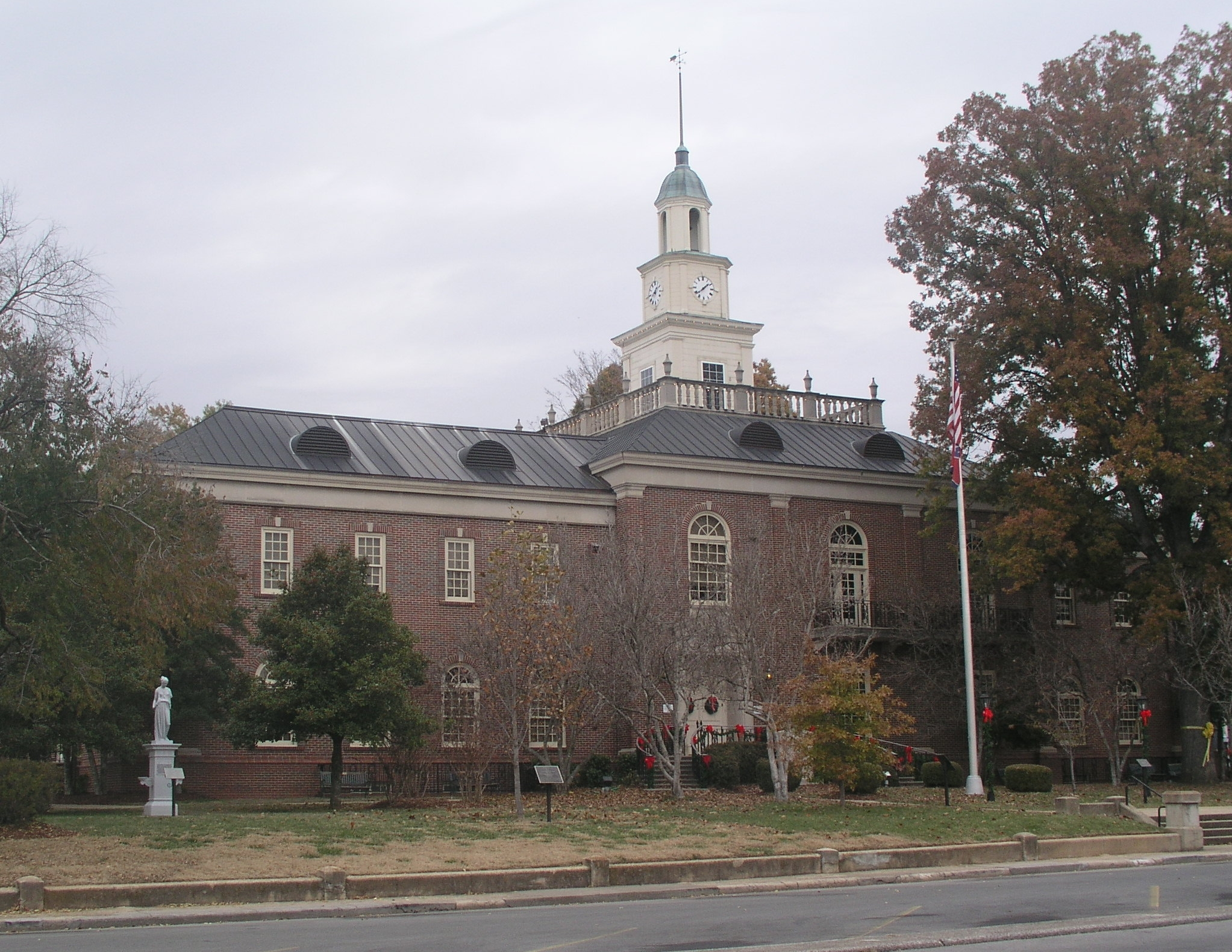
- Lincoln County Courthouse in Fayetteville

- Seal

- Location within the U.S. state of Tennessee
- Coordinates: 35°08′N 86°35′W
- Country: United States
- State: Tennessee
- Founded: 1809
- Named for: Benjamin Lincoln
- Seat: Fayetteville
- Largest city: Fayetteville

Area
  - Total: 571 sq mi (1,480 km^{2})
  - Land: 570 sq mi (1,500 km^{2})
  - Water: 0.4 sq mi (1.0 km^{2}) 0.07%

Population (2020)
  - Total: 35,319
  - Estimate (2025): 36,853 ▲
  - Density: 63/sq mi (24/km^{2})
- Time zone: UTC−6 (Central)
  - Summer (DST): UTC−5 (CDT)
- Congressional district: 4th
- Website: www.lincolncountytn.gov

Lincoln County is a county located in the south central part of the U.S. state of Tennessee. As of the 2020 census, the population was 35,319. Its county seat and largest city is Fayetteville. The county is named for Major General Benjamin Lincoln, an officer in the American Revolutionary War.

== History ==
Lincoln County was created in 1809 from parts of Bedford County. The land occupied by the county was part of a land cession obtained from the Cherokee and Chickasaw in 1806.

The Lincoln County Process, used in the distillation of Tennessee whiskey, is named for this county, as the Jack Daniel Distillery was originally located there. However, a subsequent redrawing of county lines resulted in the establishment of adjacent Moore County, which includes the location of the distillery. Another distillery opened in Lincoln County in 1997 – the Benjamin Pritchard's Distillery. However, it does not use the Lincoln County Process for making its Tennessee whiskey. When a law was established in 2013 to require the Lincoln County Process to be used for making all Tennessee whiskey, the Benjamin Pritchard's Distillery was exempted by a grandfather clause. Southern Pride Distillery is the only Lincoln County distillery still using the Lincoln County Process for whiskey making.

On March 5, 2017, a poultry farm that distributes products to Tyson Foods was confirmed to have a reported a case of Influenza A virus subtype H7N9 detected in birds resulting in the slaughter of 74,000 chickens.

== Geography ==
According to the U.S. Census Bureau, the county has a total area of 571 square miles (1,480 km^{2}), of which 570 square miles (1,500 km^{2}) are land and 0.4 square miles (1.0 km^{2}) (0.07%) are water.

=== Adjacent counties ===
- Bedford County (north)
- Moore County (northeast)
- Franklin County (east)
- Madison County, Alabama (south)
- Limestone County, Alabama (southwest)
- Giles County (west)
- Marshall County (northwest)

=== State protected areas ===
- Flintville Hatchery Wildlife Management Area

== Demographics ==
Historical population
Census	Pop.	Note	%±
1810	6,104		—
1820	14,761		141.8%
1830	22,075		49.5%
1840	21,493		−2.6%
1850	23,492		9.3%
1860	22,828		−2.8%
1870	28,050		22.9%
1880	26,960		−3.9%
1890	27,382		1.6%
1900	26,304		−3.9%
1910	25,908		−1.5%
1920	25,786		−0.5%
1930	25,422		−1.4%
1940	27,214		7.0%
1950	25,624		−5.8%
1960	23,829		−7.0%
1970	24,318		2.1%
1980	26,483		8.9%
1990	28,157		6.3%
2000	31,340		11.3%
2010	33,361		6.4%
2020	35,319		5.9%
2025 (est.)	36,853	▲	4.3%
U.S. Decennial Census; 1790-1960 1900-1990; 1990-2000 2010-2014 2023

=== 2020 census ===
Lincoln County racial composition
Race	Number	Percentage
White (non-Hispanic)	29,803	84.38%
Black or African American (non-Hispanic)	2,198	6.22%
Native American	116	0.33%
Asian	178	0.5%
Pacific Islander	16	0.05%
Other/Mixed	1,740	4.93%
Hispanic or Latino	1,268	3.59%

As of the 2020 census, there were 35,319 people, 14,395 households, and 9,264 families residing in the county. The median age was 43.5 years, with 22.2% of residents under the age of 18 and 20.2% 65 years of age or older. For every 100 females there were 96.2 males, and for every 100 females age 18 and over there were 94.5 males age 18 and over.

Of those households, 29.0% had children under the age of 18 living in them, 49.8% were married-couple households, 18.0% were households with a male householder and no spouse or partner present, and 26.7% were households with a female householder and no spouse or partner present. About 28.4% of all households were made up of individuals and 14.0% had someone living alone who was 65 years of age or older.

There were 15,958 housing units, of which 9.8% were vacant. Among occupied housing units, 73.3% were owner-occupied and 26.7% were renter-occupied. The homeowner vacancy rate was 1.6% and the rental vacancy rate was 7.3%.

The racial makeup of the county was 85.5% White, 6.2% Black or African American, 0.4% American Indian and Alaska Native, 0.5% Asian, 0.1% Native Hawaiian and Pacific Islander, 1.4% from some other race, and 5.9% from two or more races. Hispanic or Latino residents of any race comprised 3.6% of the population.

28.7% of residents lived in urban areas, while 71.3% lived in rural areas.

=== 2010 census ===
As of the 2010 census, there were 33,361 people, 15,241 households, and 4,239 families residing in the county. The population density was 55 people per square mile (21 people/km^{2}). There were 13,999 housing units at an average density of 24 units per square mile (9.3/km^{2}). The racial makeup of the county was 89.45% White, 6.80% Black or African American, 0.45% Native American, 0.36% Asian, 0.06% Pacific Islander, 1.10% from other races, and 1.78% from two or more races. 2.65% of the population were Hispanic or Latino of any race.

There were 15,241 households, out of which 28% had children under the age of 18 living with them, 58% were married couples living together, 11% had a female head of household with no husband present, and 27% were non-families. 25% of all households were made up of individuals, and 12% had someone living alone who was 65 years of age or older. The average household size was 2.45 and the average family size was 2.93.

In the county, the population was spread out, with 24% under the age of 18, 8% from 18 to 24, 28% from 25 to 44, 25% from 45 to 64, and 16% who were 65 years of age or older. The median age was 39 years. For every 100 females there were 93.9 males. For every 100 females age 18 and over, there were 90.8 males.

The median income for a household in the county was $33,434, and the median income for a family was $41,454. Males had a median income of $30,917 versus $21,722 for females. The per capita income for the county was $18,837. About 10% of families and 14% of the population were below the poverty line, including 17% of those under age 18 and 20% of those age 65 or over.

== Government ==
Prior to 1968, Lincoln County was a Democratic Party stronghold in presidential elections similar to most other counties in the Solid South. The county backed segregationist George Wallace in 1968, but despite voting Republican for the first time in Richard Nixon’s 49-state 1972 landslide, remained Democratic-leaning up to 1992. Since then, it has become a Republican Party stronghold, with its candidates winning the county by increasing margins with each succeeding presidential election starting with 1996.

United States presidential election results for Lincoln County, Tennessee
Year	Republican		Democratic		Third party(ies)	
Year	No.	%	No.	%	No.	%
1912	672	19.59%	2,651	77.27%	108	3.15%
1916	552	16.44%	2,791	83.14%	14	0.42%
1920	1,091	30.65%	2,463	69.19%	6	0.17%
1924	357	13.01%	2,356	85.86%	31	1.13%
1928	743	23.76%	2,377	76.02%	7	0.22%
1932	288	8.40%	3,095	90.26%	46	1.34%
1936	430	11.06%	3,451	88.76%	7	0.18%
1940	521	12.07%	3,781	87.62%	13	0.30%
1944	573	13.28%	3,735	86.54%	8	0.19%
1948	361	8.83%	2,969	72.63%	758	18.54%
1952	1,654	26.78%	4,510	73.01%	13	0.21%
1956	1,207	21.21%	4,434	77.90%	51	0.90%
1960	1,428	22.53%	4,862	76.71%	48	0.76%
1964	1,728	26.23%	4,861	73.77%	0	0.00%
1968	1,167	16.14%	1,848	25.56%	4,214	58.29%
1972	3,266	61.84%	1,867	35.35%	148	2.80%
1976	1,724	22.93%	5,732	76.24%	62	0.82%
1980	2,856	33.96%	5,387	64.06%	166	1.97%
1984	3,982	49.08%	4,103	50.57%	29	0.36%
1988	4,288	53.49%	3,672	45.80%	57	0.71%
1992	3,814	37.02%	5,063	49.15%	1,425	13.83%
1996	4,551	46.69%	4,361	44.74%	835	8.57%
2000	5,435	50.99%	5,060	47.47%	164	1.54%
2004	7,829	62.85%	4,546	36.49%	82	0.66%
2008	9,231	70.30%	3,695	28.14%	204	1.55%
2012	9,803	73.88%	3,290	24.80%	175	1.32%
2016	10,398	77.90%	2,554	19.13%	396	2.97%
2020	12,281	78.68%	2,919	18.70%	408	2.61%
2024	13,208	81.89%	2,782	17.25%	138	0.86%

The governing body of Lincoln County is the Lincoln County Commission, which is divided into eight districts and 24 commissioners, three from each district. The body is chaired by the County Mayor. The government center of Lincoln County is the Lincoln County Courthouse in Fayetteville.

== Communities ==
=== Cities ===
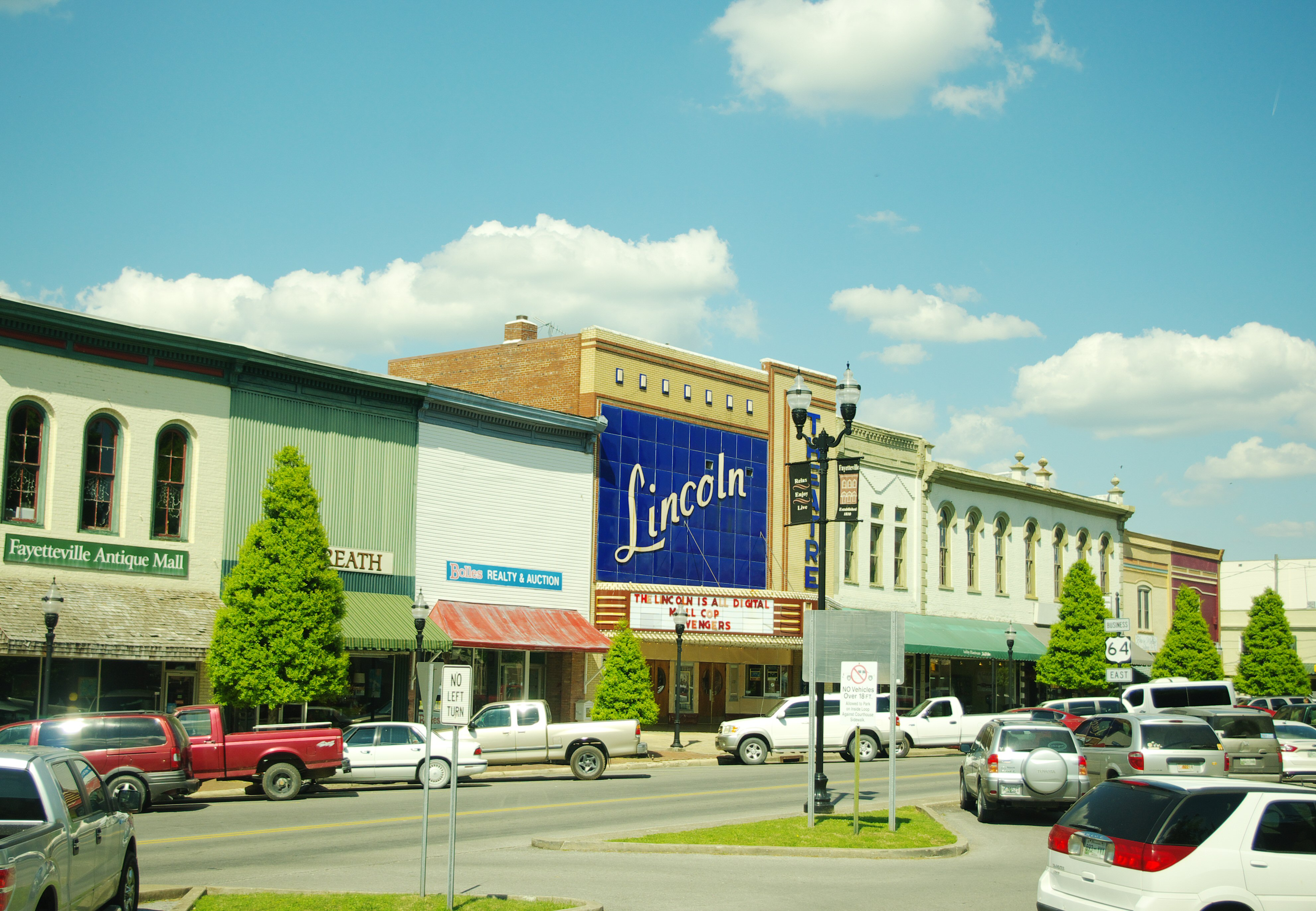
Fayetteville

- Ardmore, Tennessee (partial)
- Fayetteville (county seat)

=== Town ===
- Petersburg (partial)

=== Census-designated places ===
- Blanche
- Dellrose
- Flintville
- Park City
- Taft

=== Other unincorporated communities ===
- Belleville
- Booneville
- Elora
- Kelso
- Kirkland
- Mimosa
- Mulberry
- New Dellrose
- Shady Grove

== Education ==
Education in Lincoln County is mostly led by the Lincoln County Department of Education (LCDOE).

=== Schools in the Lincoln County District ===
==== High schools (9–12) ====
- Lincoln County High School (Tennessee)

==== Elementary schools/Middle schools (PK–8) ====
- Highland Rim Elementary/Middle School
- South Lincoln Elementary/Middle School
- Flintville Elementary/Middle School
- Unity Elementary/Middle School
- Blanche Elementary/Middle School

=== Schools in the Fayetteville City District ===
- Ralph Askins School (Pre-K–5)
- Fayetteville Middle School (6–8)
- Fayetteville High School (9–12)

== See also ==
- National Register of Historic Places listings in Lincoln County, Tennessee
