= Tornado outbreak of March 31 – April 1, 2023 =

2023 tornado outbreak in the Midwestern and Southern United States

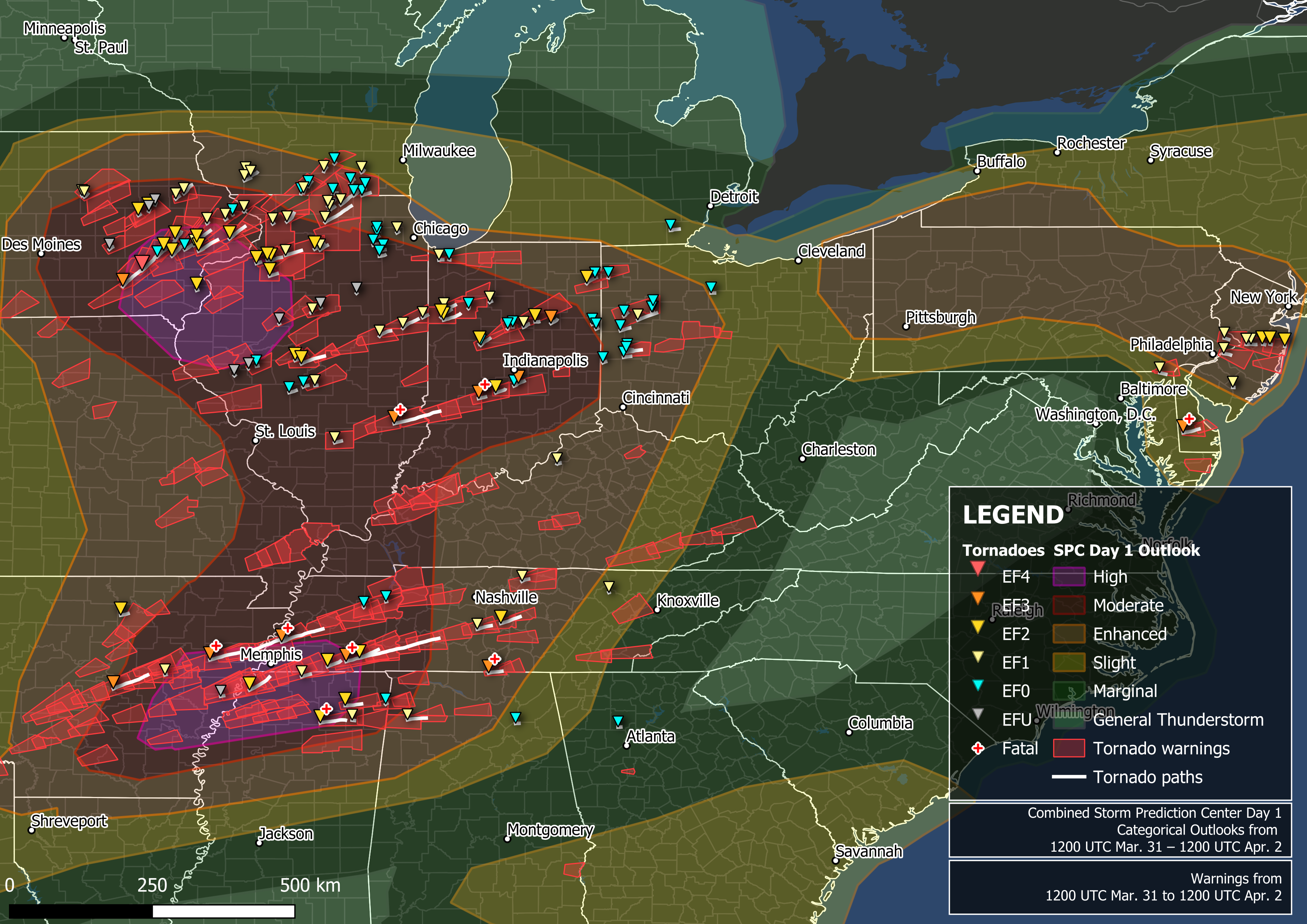
- Map of tornado warnings and confirmed tornadoes from the outbreak.

Meteorological history
- Duration: March 31 – April 1, 2023

Tornado outbreak
- Tornadoes: 146
- Max. rating: EF4 tornado
- Duration: 1 day, 5 hours 24 minutes
- Highest winds: Tornadic – 170 mph (270 km/h) (Keota, Iowa EF4 on March 31)
- Highest gusts: Non-tornadic – 100 mph (160 km/h) near Harlan, Indiana
- Largest hail: 3.5 in (8.9 cm) near Beverly, Illinois

Extratropical cyclone
- Lowest pressure: 985 hPa (mbar); 29.09 inHg
- Max. rainfall: 2.84 inches (7.2 cm) in central West Virginia on April 1
- Max. snowfall: 22 in (55.9 cm) near Caspian, Michigan

Overall effects
- Fatalities: 26 (+1 indirect, +6 non-tornadic)
- Injuries: >218 injuries
- Damage: $5.7 billion
- Areas affected: Midwestern, Southern and Eastern United States
- Power outages: 1,000,000 customers
- Part of the tornado outbreaks of 2023 and 2022–23 North American winter

A widespread, deadly, and historic tornado outbreak affected large portions of the Midwestern, Southern and Eastern United States on March 31 and April 1, 2023, the result of an extratropical cyclone that also produced blizzard conditions in the Upper Midwest. The Storm Prediction Center (SPC) issued a rare high risk for severe weather in two areas of the Mississippi Valley on March 31, the first high risk issuance since March 25, 2021. Approximately 28 million people were placed under tornado watches, including multiple PDS tornado watches, from the evening of March 31 through the overnight hours into the morning of April 1. This included the Little Rock, St. Louis, Chicago, and Memphis metropolitan areas, all of which were hit by multiple rounds of severe squall lines and supercell thunderstorms that produced damaging winds, large hail, and strong to violent tornadoes. EF3 tornadoes in Arkansas, Tennessee, and Illinois prompted the issuance of tornado emergencies and multiple mass casualty incidents were declared for some of the hardest hit areas. One of these tornadoes was a high-end EF3 tornado that passed through the northern Little Rock metro, causing extensive damage and dozens of injuries. The strongest tornado was a low-end EF4 tornado that swept away homes on the west side of Keota, Iowa. The Apollo Theatre in Belvidere, Illinois collapsed during a concert due to an EF1 tornado, injuring up to 40 concertgoers and killing one. Severe and tornadic weather also affected the Northeastern United States in the afternoon and evening of April 1, including a rare EF3 tornado that caused a death in Sussex County, Delaware. At certain points of the outbreak, over 20 simultaneous tornado warnings were active, with a total of 175 tornado warnings issued on March 31 with an additional 51 issued on April 1.

In all, 146 tornadoes touched down; 115 occurred on March 31 alone. The outbreak ranks third worldwide for producing the most tornadoes in a 24-hour period, with 136 tornadoes occurring between 19:00 UTC March 31 and 19:00 UTC April 1. That tally is surpassed only by the 1974 Super Outbreak with 148 in that 18-hour outbreak and the 2011 Super Outbreak with 219 in its busiest 24-hour period, although both of those outbreaks were far more prolific in the number of significant tornadoes produced. This was also the most tornadoes in an outbreak since the 2011 Super Outbreak. Tornadoes killed 26 people during the outbreak, along with one indirect tornado-related fatality. Six other weather-related fatalities took place: five from straight-line winds and one indirect fatality during cleanup. Additionally, over 218 injuries also occurred during the outbreak. Later in the year, tornado expert Thomas P. Grazulis published the outbreak intensity score (OIS) as a way to rank outbreaks. The outbreak received 129 OIS points, ranking it as a historic tornado outbreak.

== Meteorological synopsis ==
The Public Weather Outlook issued by the Storm Prediction Center on the morning of March 31

As another significant tornado outbreak was taking place across the Southern regions of the United States, the Storm Prediction Center had already highlighted a large 15% contour for severe weather across much of the area, where conditions were expected to become increasingly favorable for another severe weather event. By March 29, large sections of Iowa, Illinois, Missouri, southwestern Indiana, Arkansas, the western Tennessee Valley, and Kentucky were all given an enhanced risk for severe weather. In this region, a powerful mid to upper level trough was expected to eject and interact with an atmosphere containing elevated moisture given the moderate dew points across the area, and elevated low and high level jet streams. This made the environment favorable for the development of a strong, fast-moving squall line, and discrete supercell thunderstorms capable of damaging winds, large hail, and tornadoes.

By March 30, the Storm Prediction Center (SPC) introduced a moderate risk for severe weather for two distinct regions in the northern and southern sections of the main risk area, where significant, long-tracked tornadoes were expected. In this outlook, the SPC discussed the presence of very high CAPE values reaching into the 1,000–1,500 J/kg range, wind shear of more than 60 kt, and strong helicity of around 400 m^{2}/s^{2}, which aided the sustainment of supercells. Two distinct areas were given a 15% hatched risk for significant tornadoes. The first stretched between southeastern Iowa and northwestern Illinois, and the second was in northeastern portions of Arkansas, the Missouri Bootheel, western Tennessee, small sections of southwestern Kentucky, and northwestern Mississippi.

=== March 31 ===
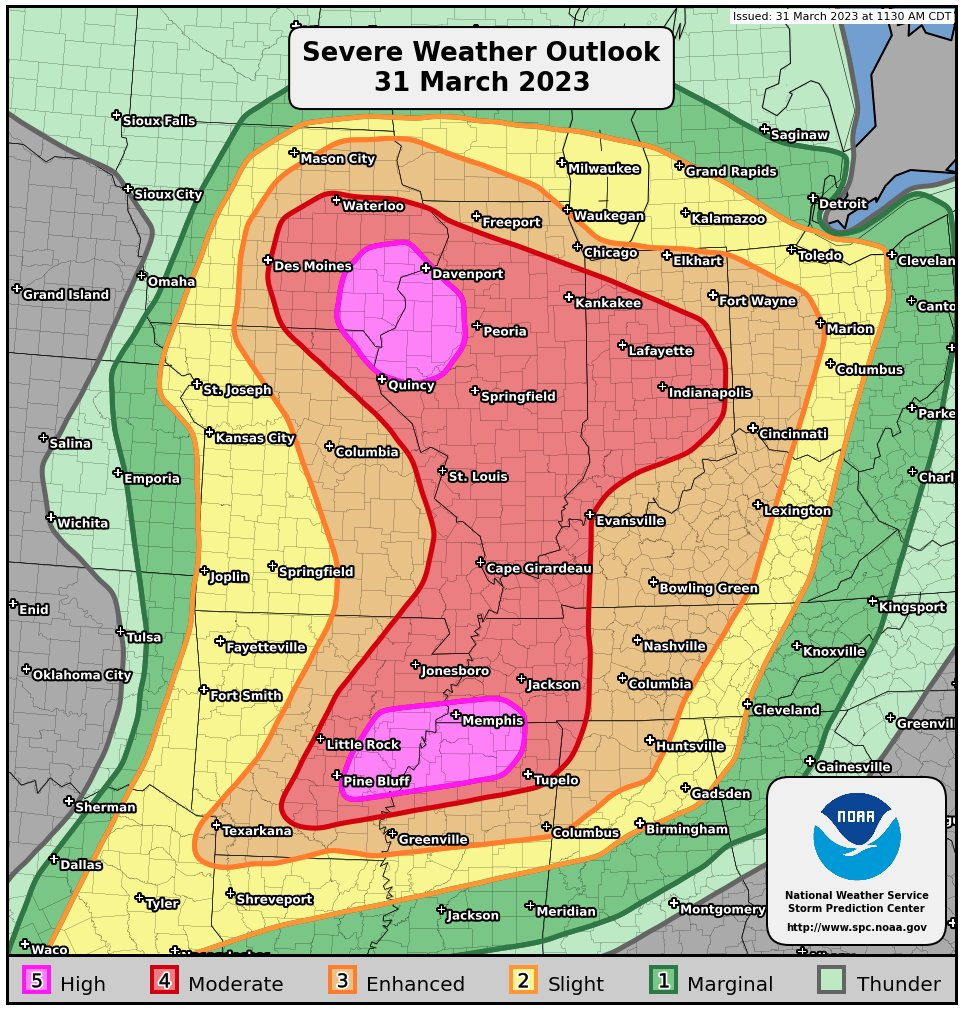
The Storm Prediction Center’s Severe Weather Outlook for March 31, 2023

An extratropical cyclone developed over Nebraska on the morning of March 31. As a result, meteorologists expected a storm mode of discrete supercells to develop. This, along with the presence of even stronger CAPE values and a more unstable environment across Illinois and eastern Missouri, led to the SPC "bridging" the two main moderate risk areas and giving a 15% hatched risk for significant tornadoes at their 1300 UTC outlook. The surrounding area, which extended into central portions of Kentucky and Tennessee, extreme southwestern Indiana, and northwestern Alabama, was given a 10% hatched risk for tornadoes. Additionally, a large 30% partially hatched contour for damaging wind gusts (with a smaller 45% risk in the northern part of the risk), and large hail were also added in this new outlook.

With increased confidence of favorable parameters for severe weather, the SPC upped the threat for strong tornadoes even further, introducing two tornado-driven high risk areas in their 16:30 UTC outlook; it was the first high risk issuance since March 25, 2021. In 2024, SPC forecaster and meteorologist Andrew Lyons stated, "we've been building up to this crescendo all week, knowing that pretty much all the parameters are there for something big and then one by one, each piece kind of fell in that morning." The first high risk area covered southeastern Iowa, northwestern Illinois, and far northeastern Missouri, while the second included eastern Arkansas, southwestern Tennessee, and northern Mississippi. These two distinct areas were given a 30% hatched risk for tornadoes, given the extremely favorable environment for the development and sustainment of discrete supercells with strong to violent tornado potential. The northern high-risk area was expected to see an arcing band of quasi-discrete supercells that would initially produce large hail before becoming tornadic with the possibility of producing several long-track strong to potentially violent tornadoes. Supercells would be more scattered, but longer tracked within the southern high-risk area with multiple rounds of tornadic storms capable of producing long-lived strong to violent tornadoes expected. The large area surrounding and connecting the two high risk areas maintained a moderate risk, with an accompanying 15% hatched risk for tornadoes, as supercells that could develop in this environment could similarly sustain and rotate, although storm coverage was expected to be somewhat lower, and the environment would not be as favorable. All throughout the main risk area, an elevated risk for damaging winds and large hail was also issued, with the supercells initially capable of producing very large hail and long-tracked tornadoes expected to transition into QLCS structures capable of producing very strong straight-line winds and additional tornadoes that evening. Soon after the upgrade into a high risk, the SPC introduced their first two particularly dangerous situation tornado watches, indicating a 90-95% chance for multiple tornadoes, and a 90% chance for one or more strong to violent tornadoes.

Radar evolution of the Little Rock and Wynne–Covington supercells

Not long after these watches were issued, isolated discrete supercells began to develop across the western part of the state of Arkansas. The first tornado, which was rated high-end EF3, to touch down in this area prompted a tornado emergency as it caused catastrophic damage and dozens of casualties in the western and northern part of the Little Rock metro. Later, another deadly long-tracked intense EF3 tornado moved directly through Wynne, destroying a large portion of the community. As that tornado moved in Tennessee and started to dissipate, the same storm produced another destructive EF3 tornado, which would become the largest of the outbreak with a width of over a mile, that struck the southern part of Covington, heavily damaging or destroying numerous structures, including homes and schools, along with more casualties. Farther to the north, discrete supercell development was much more widespread with several forming in northern Missouri, producing large to very large hail and gusty winds before quickly becoming tornadic as they moved northeastward into southeastern Iowa and western Illinois. One of the first tornadoes in this area was an intense high-end EF3 tornado that passed near Martinsburg, Iowa, severely damaging homes and outbuildings. As that tornado was dissipating, the same storm produced a violent low-end EF4 tornado, the strongest tornado of the outbreak, which passed near Keota, severely damaging and destroying several homes, including one home that was completely swept away. As the afternoon progressed, numerous tornadoes, including over a dozen EF2 tornadoes, touched down across this area from both discrete supercells and from an evolving squall line that moved into southern Wisconsin and northern Illinois. Farther to the south, additional supercells also began to form in Northeast Texas; these storms produced occasional large to very large hail and damaging wind gusts. East of there, another PDS tornado watch was issued for northwestern Alabama, northern Mississippi, and West and Middle Tennessee, in advance of isolated tornadic supercells that were moving eastward into the area and where more tornadic supercells were expected to develop.

Video of the tornado that caused the collapse of the Apollo Theatre of Belvidere, Illinois

After dark, despite the absence of daylight heating, strong wind shear continued to support the squall line over northern Illinois and southern Wisconsin. This led to widespread wind damage and several weak tornado touchdowns in the Chicago metropolitan area. This included a long-tracked EF1 tornado that struck the historic Apollo Theatre in Belvidere, Illinois, during a Morbid Angel and Crypta concert, causing a collapse of the venue's roof, killing one person and injuring at least 40 others. Additionally, an organizing cluster of severe storms with embedded supercells oriented from southwest to northeast continued to produce tornadoes, some of which were strong, as they moved northeastward through eastern Illinois into western Indiana. Another deadly high-end EF3 tornado spawned from a rogue supercell ahead of an advancing squall line in eastern Illinois and prompted yet another tornado emergency as it passed near Robinson, Illinois, before crossing into Indiana and striking the southern part of Sullivan, Indiana, damaging or destroying homes and mobile homes along its track. The squall line and lone supercell continued to produce mostly short-lived tornadoes as it moved through Indiana and into Ohio, although several of these tornadoes were strong to intense. This included another EF3 tornado that killed two people and injured two others on and east of McCormick's Creek State Park, and two more EF3 tornadoes that impacted Whiteland and areas east of Gas City respectively. Farther to the south, isolated supercells continued to move eastward, producing sporadic instances of severe weather. One intense supercell spawned two strong EF2 tornadoes that impacted Hardeman County and Bethel Springs, Tennessee, respectively. Later that evening, another isolated, intense supercell following along a similar track as the previous one produced a destructive, long-tracked EF3 tornado that also impacted Bethel Springs, as well as the northern part of Adamsville and Hookers Bend. This became the deadliest and longest-tracked tornado of the outbreak, killing nine people along a path of just over 85 miles (137 km).

=== April 1 ===
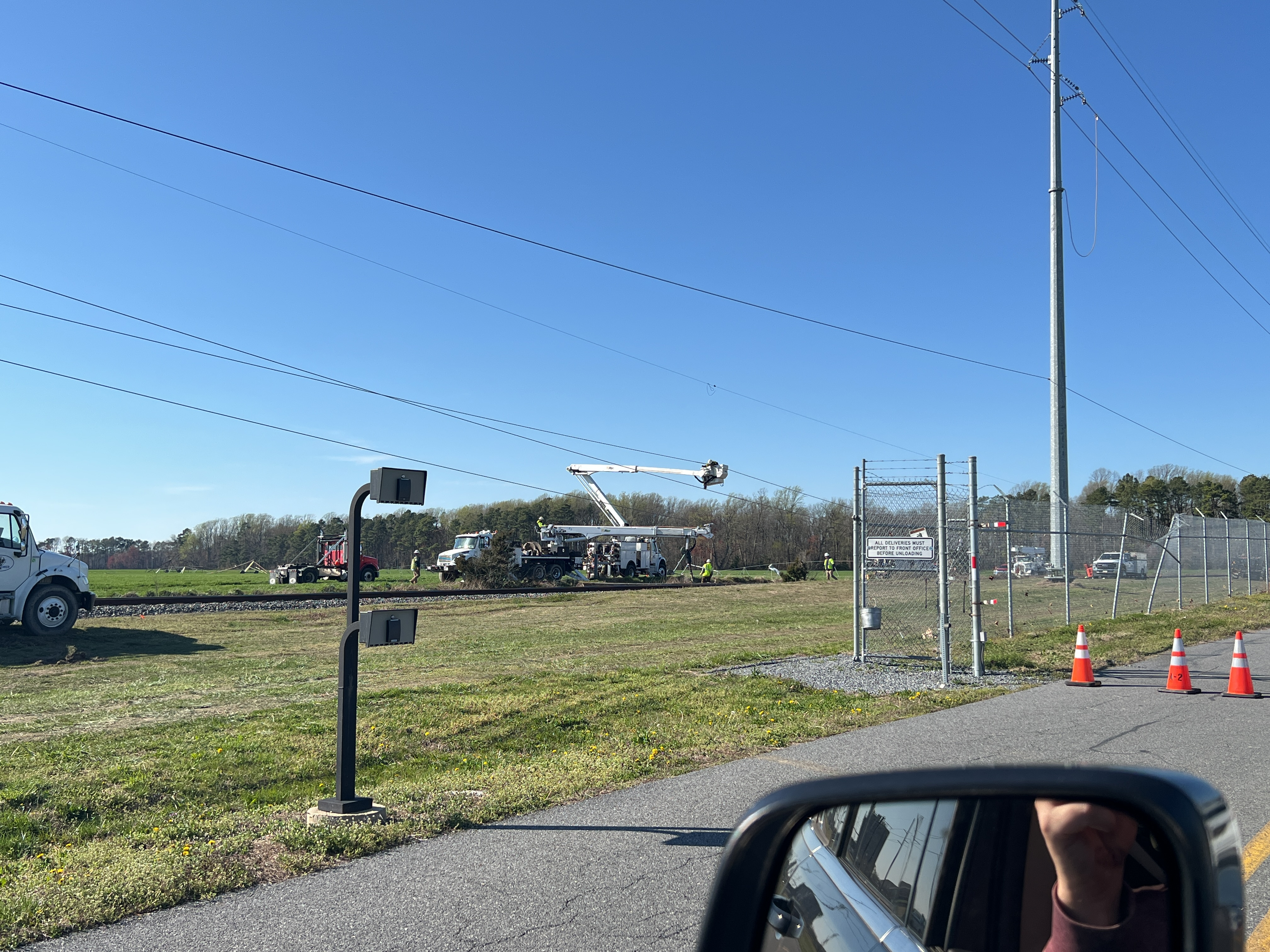
Low-end EF3 damage to electrical transmission lines north of Bridgeville, Delaware.

During the overnight hours of April 1, the most favorable atmospheric conditions for severe weather began to shift farther to the south. This caused the advancing line of severe storms to weaken from north to south as it continued eastward. The severe storms in Ohio produced some additional weak tornadoes and scattered wind damage before weakening below severe limits as it moved into the central portion of the state. To the south, the same supercell that produced the long-tracked deadly EF3 tornado continued to move east-northeastward across Middle Tennessee. A high-end EF2 tornado spawned by the storm south of Murfreesboro struck and heavily damaged Readyville with numerous structures, including some historic buildings and homes, that were damaged or destroyed. Two more supercells also developed in northern Mississippi, eventually strengthening and producing more destructive tornadoes as they moved through the Tupelo micropolitan area, including one EF2 tornado that killed a person near Pontotoc, before crossing into northern Alabama. The northern storm then produced another intense high-end EF3 tornado near Hazel Green that destroyed multiple homes and killed a person along the Alabama-Tennessee state line. The tornado dissipated after crossing the state line and the parent storm only produced some wind damage before weakening shortly afterwards. The southern storm continued to produce wind damage and weak, isolated tornadoes for several hours as it moved through northern Alabama and into the northern part of Georgia before weakening below severe limits just after sunrise.

More severe weather was expected later on April 1; in the Southeastern United States, the SPC issued a slight risk for severe weather for the possibility of damaging winds, although isolated large hail and tornadoes were also possible. Some marginally severe storms formed in Georgia that afternoon, although only sporadic damaging winds were observed from this line of storms before they quickly weakened and dissipated that afternoon and evening. Further to the north, another, much larger slight risk was issued across portions the Ohio Valley and Northeastern United States; wind damage, large hail, and isolated tornadoes were all possible that morning and afternoon. A slightly higher potential for tornadoes also existed in the Philadelphia metropolitan area along with Central and South Jersey, where conditional supercell development was possible due to favorable wind profiles and an increasing amount of low-level moisture. Around mid-morning, a new line of strong to severe storms quickly formed behind the original weakening convection, producing widespread damaging wind gusts across northeastern Ohio as well as a weak EF0 tornado that struck Dundee, Michigan. As this line of storms approached western Pennsylvania, the SPC upped the wind damage threat from 15% to 30% at their 16:30 UTC outlook update, prompting the issuance of an enhanced risk for severe weather across eastern Ohio and southern New York along with most of Pennsylvania and New Jersey. The entire line of storms then weakened as they moved into a limited moisture environment in central Pennsylvania, but the southern part of the line quickly intensified again as it moved into a more buoyant air mass over eastern Pennsylvania. As it moved eastward into the Philadelphia metropolitan area, these severe storms again began to produce widespread wind damage. Just to the east of Philadelphia and the Delaware River, an even greater amount of moisture along with strong deep layer wind shear and low-level veering of the winds had moved, as predicted, into Central and South Jersey; this aided in the development of embedded supercells within the severe squall line, which produced more damaging winds, isolated large hail, and several tornadoes. Seven tornadoes touched down in New Jersey, tying the November 1989 tornado outbreak for the most tornadoes in a single day in the state. Five of the tornadoes were produced by one cell in the line in Central Jersey with the last three being rated EF2. Additionally, as the severe squall line was reintensifying, one lone supercell developed south of Washington, D.C., and moved over the Delmarva Peninsula, where it spawned a destructive, low-end EF3 tornado that damaged or destroyed numerous homes and killed a person in Sussex County, Delaware. This was the first killer tornado in the state since 1983 and only the second tornado in Delaware to be officially rated F3/EF3 since modern records began in 1950. It was also the widest tornado on record in the state. The severe threat continued across the Delmarva Peninsula before all the storms shifted offshore shortly after 10 pm EDT, ending the outbreak.

== Confirmed tornadoes ==
Confirmed tornadoes by Enhanced Fujita rating
EFU	EF0	EF1	EF2	EF3	EF4	EF5	Total
9	45	48	32	11	1	0	146

=== Little Rock–North Little Rock–Jacksonville, Arkansas ===
Little Rock–North Little Rock–Jacksonville, Arkansas
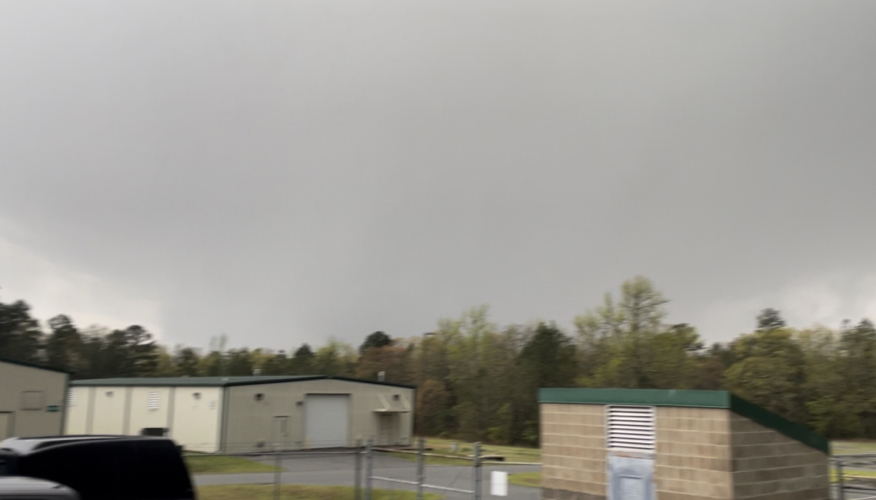
- The Little Rock EF3 wedge tornado as seen from Camp Joseph T. Robinson.

Meteorological history
- Formed: March 31, 2023, 2:18 p.m. CDT (UTC−05:00)
- Dissipated: March 31, 2023, 2:58 p.m. CDT (UTC−05:00)
- Duration: 40 minutes

EF3 tornado
- on the Enhanced Fujita scale
- Highest winds: 165 mph (266 km/h)

Overall effects
- Casualties: 0 fatalities (+1 indirect), 54 injuries

This long-tracked, very high-end EF3 wedge tornado developed just southwest of the Martindale community, near the intersection of Colonel Glenn Road and Marsh Road in Pulaski County at 2:18 p.m. CDT and quickly reached EF3 intensity as it impacted the Calais Forest apartment complex where high-end EF3 damage occurred. After this, the tornado reached its peak intensity on Shackleford Road in the Walnut Valley neighborhood of Little Rock. High-end EF3 damage was observed, with multiple homes at the intersection of Shackleford and Breckenridge being completely leveled. Widespread EF2 damage was also noted in this area.

As the tornado crossed I-430, it damaged a shopping center before approaching another residential area where more homes and apartments suffered severe damage. Hundreds of trees were also uprooted. The tornado caused further tree damage at Murray Park before crossing the Arkansas River into North Little Rock. As the tornado crossed into North Little Rock, it damaged more homes before crossing the river and uprooting and snapping hundreds to thousands of trees at Burns Park. The tornado then crossed I-40/US 65 near exit 150 and struck an under-construction fire station on Military Drive. Further damage to homes, businesses, and apartments occurred, with some homes losing their roofs, before the tornado approached North Little Rock's Indian Hills subdivision, where further tree and house damage occurred. The tornado appeared to weaken at this point, producing less severe damage to homes and businesses, before ripping the roof off of an apartment and passing over Indianhead Lake. Further damage to homes and trees occurred. The tornado then exited residential areas and entered a marsh where further tree damage occurred, before crossing US 67/US 167/Future I-57 where a tractor-trailer was flipped. Following this, the tornado re-entered populated areas and re-strengthened as more homes and businesses sustained severe damage, before completely destroying a church and entering Lonoke County in the Holland Bottoms wildlife preserve. The tornado entered Parnell, where roofs were damaged and garages destroyed before the tornado crossed AR 89 and destroyed a mobile home. After this, the tornado entered primarily rural areas, while damaging more homes and trees, before crossing AR 321 and lifting. The tornado was responsible for $90 million of direct property damage. The sole indirect fatality occurred in North Little Rock, where a man suffered a heart attack and failed to be revived after 30 minutes of CPR.

The tornado was on the ground for 34.44 miles (55.43 km) and reached a peak width of 600 yards (550 m). A total of 2,648 structures were damaged or destroyed throughout the city. Little Rock officials deployed 115 city workers to clear debris from roadways, and all routes were cleared for traffic by the afternoon of April 1. Shortly after the tornado struck, a mass casualty event was declared for the area, with the initial casualty count being over 600 injuries, though this figure was later found to be untrue. Fifty-four injuries were directly attributed to the tornado, with one indirect fatality occurring due to the tornado as well.

=== Keota–Wellman, Iowa ===
Keota–Wellman, Iowa
- The tornado after touchdown.

Meteorological history
- Formed: March 31, 2023, 5:12 p.m. CDT (UTC−05:00)
- Dissipated: March 31, 2023, 5:37 p.m. CDT (UTC−05:00)
- Duration: 25 minutes

EF4 tornado
- on the Enhanced Fujita scale
- Highest winds: 170 mph (270 km/h)

Overall effects
- Casualties: 3 injuries

As the EF3 Ottumwa/Martinsburg wedge tornado began to weaken and dissipate, the same parent supercell produced this violent tornado. It touched down to the southwest of Keota in Keokuk County, Iowa, at 5:12 p.m. CDT and moved northeastward, crossing Iowa 92. It quickly intensified as it damaged or destroyed multiple outbuildings and hog confinement buildings at EF2 intensity. At this point, the tornado began to take in copious amounts of dust and grew into a large wedge tornado, captured on video by many storm chasers in the area. The tornado began to leave cycloidal scour marks in farm fields, indicating the presence of multiple-vortices within the main circulation. It then narrowly missed the small city of Keota, passing to the northwest by a few hundred yards. High-end EF3 damage occurred just outside of town as a house was flattened, another home was left with only interior walls standing, and multiple outbuildings were damaged or destroyed. The tornado then reached its peak intensity of low-end EF4 as it crossed 190th Street north of Keota, where a farmhouse was completely swept away with only the basement foundation remaining. Debris from the home was scattered long distances through fields, and outbuildings were obliterated as well. Several large trees in this vicinity were completely debarked with only stubs of the largest branches remaining.

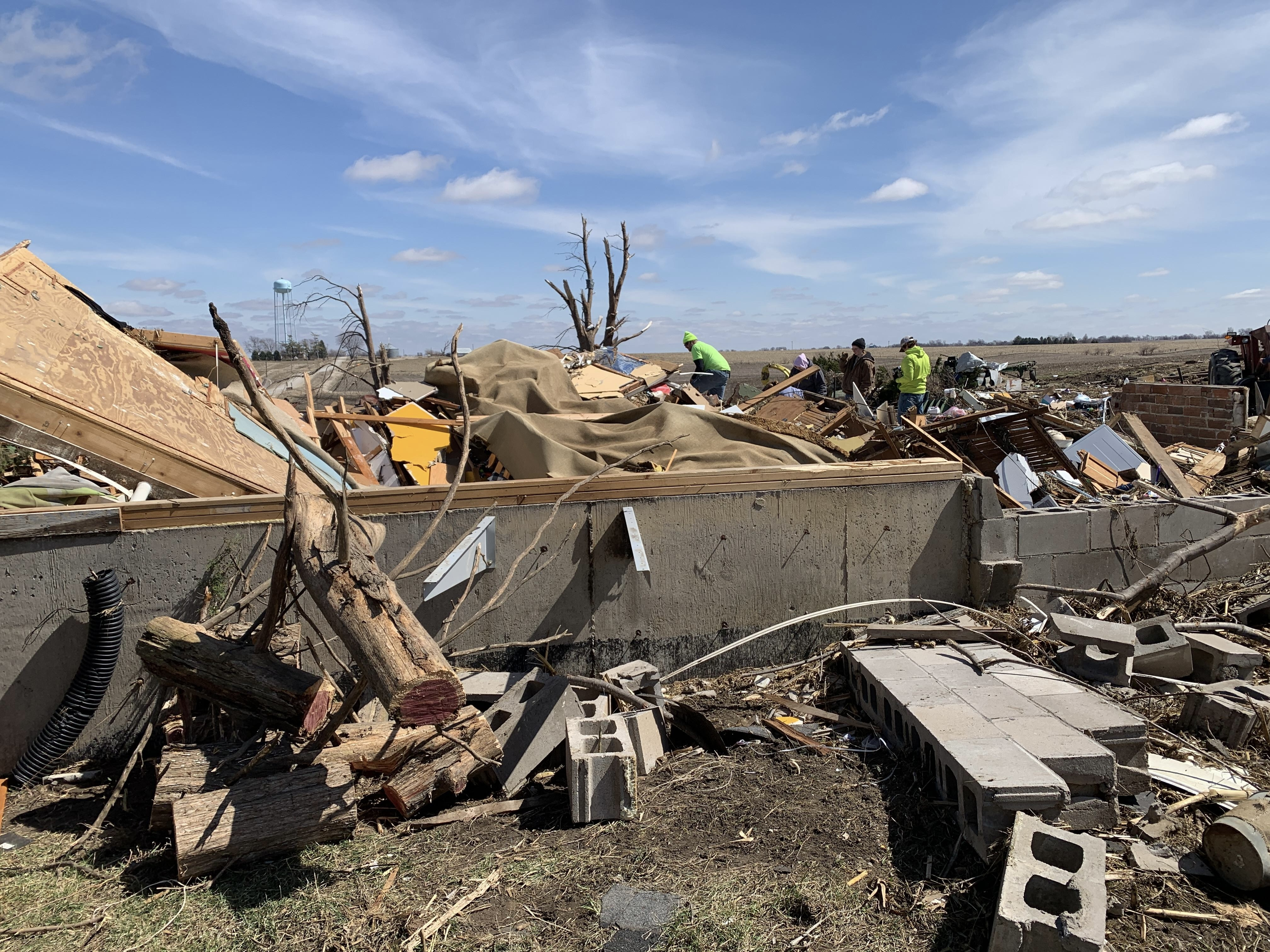
EF4 damage to a home north of Keota, Iowa.

Still continuing northeast, the tornado weakened slightly to high-end EF3 strength as it crossed into Washington County and destroyed a farmstead at the intersection of 170th Street and Birch Avenue. Here, a three-story farmhouse was completely leveled with debris strewn through an adjacent field. Outbuildings were destroyed, while multiple vehicles were thrown hundreds of yards and were left severely mangled, including one car that was lofted 1,000 feet (300 m) through the air. It weakened but still continued to cause significant damage at high-end EF2 intensity as it tracked to the northeast for several miles, impacting additional farmsteads. A house in this area sustained roof and exterior wall loss, a hog confinement building was completely destroyed, and multiple outbuildings were damaged. High-end EF2 damage continued as the tornado passed to the west of Wellman, where a 325-foot (99 m) tall radio tower along 125th Street was toppled to the ground, additional damage to farms occurred, and a house sustained major roof damage. Moving to the northeast past Wellman, the tornado weakened further and crossed into Iowa County, snapping trees and tree branches at EF0 to EF1 strength. Near the end of its path, it passed west of Amish and deviated in its path quite a bit, before dissipating at 5:37 p.m. CDT west-northwest of Amish. The tornado remained on the ground for 20.30 miles (32.67 km) and injured three people, though no fatalities occurred.

=== Wynne–Parkin–Turrell, Arkansas/Drummonds–Burlison, Tennessee ===
Wynne–Parkin–Turrell, Arkansas/Drummonds–Burlison, Tennessee
- The tornado as seen southwest of Wynne, shortly after it touched down.

Meteorological history
- Formed: March 31, 2023, 4:30 p.m. CDT (UTC−05:00)
- Dissipated: March 31, 2023, 5:54 p.m. CDT (UTC−05:00)
- Duration: 1 hour, 24 minutes

EF3 tornado
- on the Enhanced Fujita scale
- Highest winds: 150 mph (240 km/h)

Overall effects
- Casualties: 4 fatalities, 26 injuries
- Damage: $150.55 million

This long-tracked, intense wedge tornado touched down at 4:30 p.m. CDT west-southwest of Wynne, Arkansas and moved east-northeastward along AR 284. It quickly strengthened to EF2 intensity shortly after it touched down, tearing the roof off of a home, which also had some exterior walls collapsed, and farm outbuilding nearby was completely destroyed. Continuing east-northeast, the tornado crossed AR 193 in Ellis Chapel, where wooden power poles were snapped, and a mobile home was rolled on its side. A few more farm buildings nearby were also completely destroyed in McElroy. At the Sewage Treatment Plant just northeast of town, a 80 yards (73 m) long shed with sturdy roofing structure of metal failed and became aloft. The roofing wadded up and destroyed two cinder block buildings before landing 100 yards (91 m). The tornado then intensified to EF3 strength as it entered Wynne and numerous storm chasers and residents videoed this tornado as it moved through the town. Many homes, mobile homes, and other structures, including Wynne High School and a corner mart, were heavily damaged or completely destroyed. Two empty rail cars on one of the Union Pacific rail lines were moved, and dozens of trees were snapped or uprooted in the town. The tornado continued to cause EF2-EF3 damage to the east of town, damaging or destroying multiple homes near the Wynne Municipal Airport and along US 64. All four fatalities from this tornado occurred in Wynne, and the National Weather Service in Memphis, Tennessee issued a tornado emergency for Parkin and Earle as the tornado exited the town.

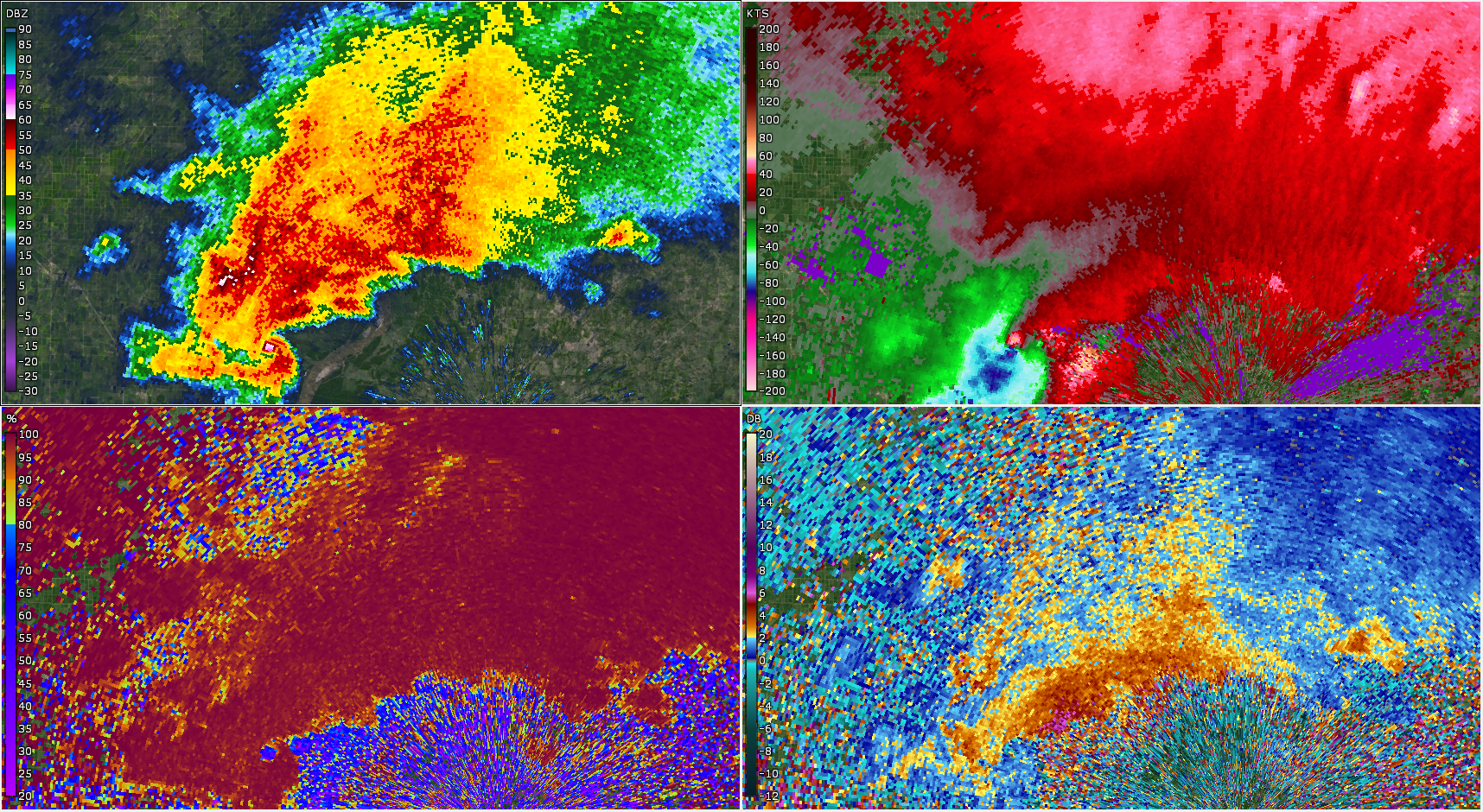
NEXRAD radar scan of the Wynne, Arkansas tornado as it crossed into Tennessee.

The tornado then weakened, passing through the northern part of Parkin and north of Earle at EF1-EF2 intensity, completely destroying numerous outbuildings, and snapping many wooden power poles. The tornado then tracked through mainly rural land after this point, with a few pivot irrigations being overturned and power poles being snapped. Near Turrell, hundreds of hardwood trees were snapped or uprooted. Another area of intense EF3 tree damage was observed along Corona Lake as the tornado straddled the Arkansas-Tennessee state line, with many trees being shredded. Around this time, another tornado emergency was issued for Dixonville, Quito, and Drummonds, Tennessee (Gilt Edge was also added in an updated warning bulletin as well). After crossing the Mississippi River, the tornado passed to the north of the former two communities, causing additional EF2 damage as moved over the Wilder Farms west of Drummonds. The tornado then began to weaken as a new circulation, which would produce the Covington EF3 tornado, strengthened to its south. After causing some more EF0-EF1 damage, the tornado dissipated south of Burlison at 5:54 p.m. CDT. The tornado had a total path length of 73 miles (117 km) and reached a peak width of 1,600 yards (1,500 m). Along with the four fatalities, 26 people were injured.

=== Brighton–Covington–Brownsville, Tennessee ===
Brighton–Covington–Brownsville, Tennessee
- The rain-wrapped tornado north of Brownsville, Tennessee

Meteorological history
- Formed: March 31, 2023, 5:48 p.m. CDT (UTC−05:00)
- Dissipated: March 31, 2023, 6:29 p.m. CDT (UTC−05:00)
- Duration: 41 minutes

EF3 tornado
- on the Enhanced Fujita scale
- Highest winds: 150 mph (240 km/h)

Overall effects
- Casualties: 1 fatality, 28 injuries
- Damage: $80.05 million (2023 USD)

As the EF3 Wynne tornado was occluding and dissipating, the same storm produced this very large, intense tornado that initially touched along SR 178 north of Munford in Tipton County and moved northeastward, damaging some fences, outbuildings, and small tree limbs at EF0 strength. It briefly reached EF1 strength, snapping and uprooting trees along Walker Field Lane before quickly weakening back to EF0 strength, snapping tree branches and inflicting minor roof damage to multiple homes in a subdivision. Shortly afterwards, the tornado began to rapidly intensify and grow in width, snapping multiple trees and power poles along Marshall Road at EF1 to EF2 intensity. The tornado then reached EF3 strength just northwest of Brighton, inflicting severe structural damage to a couple of well-built homes along Myron Creek Drive, one of which was left with only a few interior walls standing. The outer edge of the circulation impacted the north side of Brighton, where minor roof and tree damage occurred. As the tornado crossed Indian Creek Road and Jack Bennett Road, EF2 to EF3 damage occurred as multiple homes had their roofs torn off, a few had exterior walls collapsed, and one unanchored block foundation home was completely swept away, resulting in a fatality and an injury. It then reached and crossed US 51/SR 3 at EF3 intensity, growing to over one half-mile wide. Several homes were destroyed and left with only interior walls standing, and one poorly anchored home was leveled. Large trees were snapped and partially debarked nearby, and vehicles were tossed and destroyed. Other homes in this area suffered significant damage, and several businesses along US 51 were heavily damaged as well. A total of 53 power poles had to be replaced along the highway after the tornado. The National Weather Service in Memphis, Tennessee, then issued a tornado emergency for Covington as the tornado approached the town from the south-southwest.

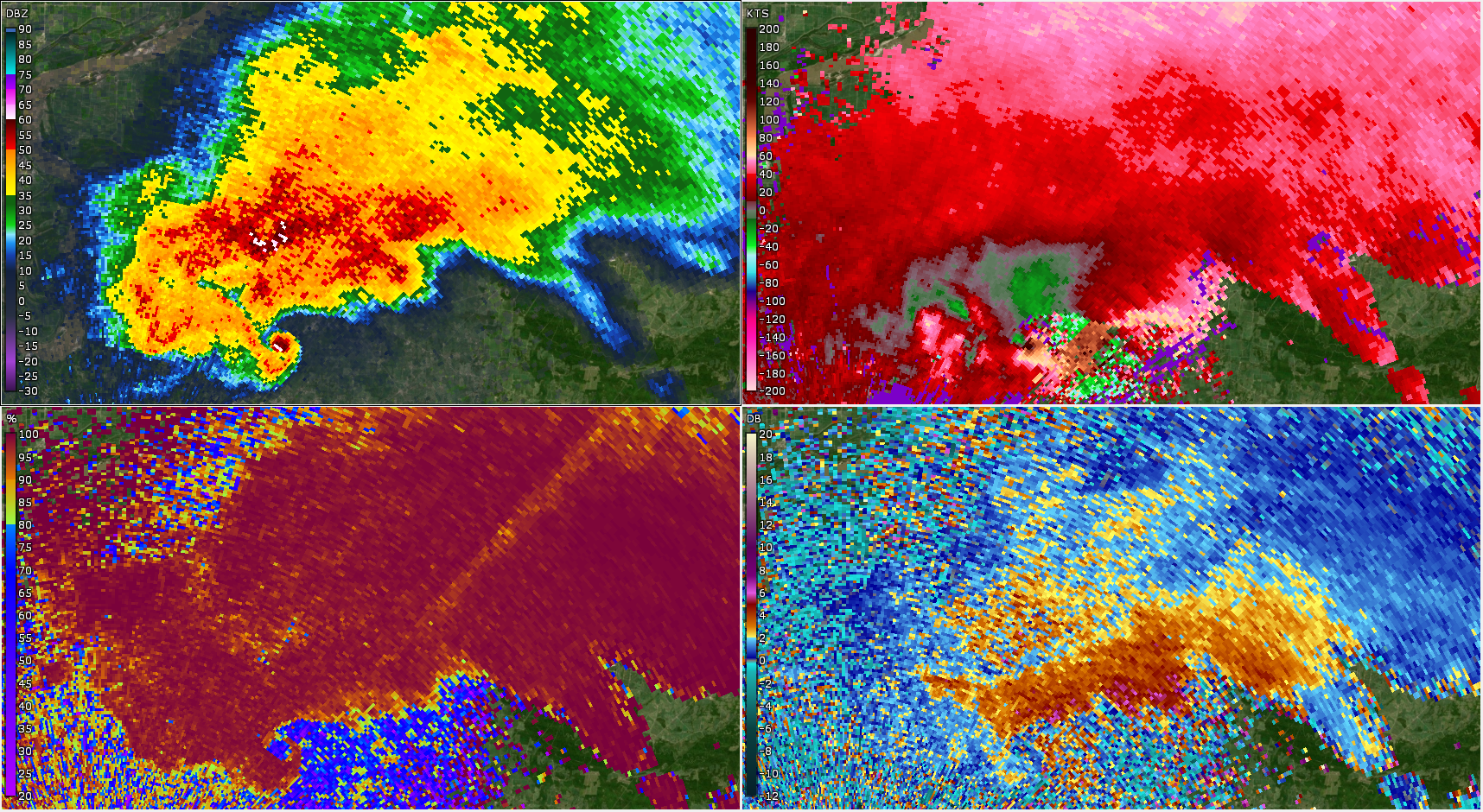
NEXRAD radar scan of the Covington, Tennessee EF3 tornado.

Maintaining EF3 strength, the tornado then turned slightly more eastward and moved into the southern part of Covington. Dozens of homes were heavily damaged or destroyed in this area, especially in the Baskin subdivision along Old Memphis Road, including one poorly anchored home that was swept away with only its concrete slab foundation left behind. Businesses along SR 59 and SR 384 were significantly damaged, some mobile homes were completely destroyed, a metal electrical truss tower and metal power poles were bent to the ground, and a piece of farming equipment was thrown 150 yards (140 m). The tornado then moved through a mostly industrial area and struck a few large warehouses and factory buildings, including Mueller Fittings and Welbilt, which sustained collapse of their roofs and multiple exterior walls. Crestview Middle School and Crestview Elementary School had severe structural damage as well, with the latter building sustaining destruction of its gymnasium and collapse of multiple walls. In addition, a gas station was destroyed and a metal dumpster was thrown 1,200 feet (370 m) from that location. EF2 to EF3 damage continued to occur as the tornado exited Covington, crossing SR 179 and SR 54. More large metal power poles were bent to the ground and several homes suffered substantial damage, including one home that was completely flattened, resulting in two serious injuries. Continuing to turn more easterly, the tornado grew to over a mile wide and maintained EF3 intensity as it crossed Locust Bluff Road. Several large steel transmission poles were blown over at this location, and a home had major roof damage.

Shortly afterwards, the tornado remained large but abruptly weakened as it approached Haywood County, moving along the north side of SR 54 at EF1 strength. Damage in this area consisted almost entirely of downed trees and power poles, along with several pivot irrigation sprinklers that were overturned and twisted, though a mobile home sustained minor damage as well. After crossing the county line, the tornado continued producing EF1 damage as it began to rapidly narrow in width and turned back northeastward, causing considerable tree damage. A poorly anchored mobile home along SR 87 was destroyed, and a nearby church had roofing torn off. The tornado then weakened to EF0 strength, causing minor tree and power line damage as it crossed over SR 19 and passed north of Brownsville. A final isolated pocket of EF1 tree damage occurred as the tornado crossed SR 54 northeast of town, snapping a few tree trunks. Some EF0 damage to tree limbs occurred as the tornado crossed Sturdivant Road before dissipating. The tornado remained on the ground for 39.53 miles (63.62 km) and reached a peak width of 2,000 yards (1,800 m). Along with the fatality, 28 people were injured.

=== Ste. Marie–Robinson, Illinois/Merom–Sullivan, Indiana ===
Ste. Marie–Robinson, Illinois/Merom–Sullivan, Indiana
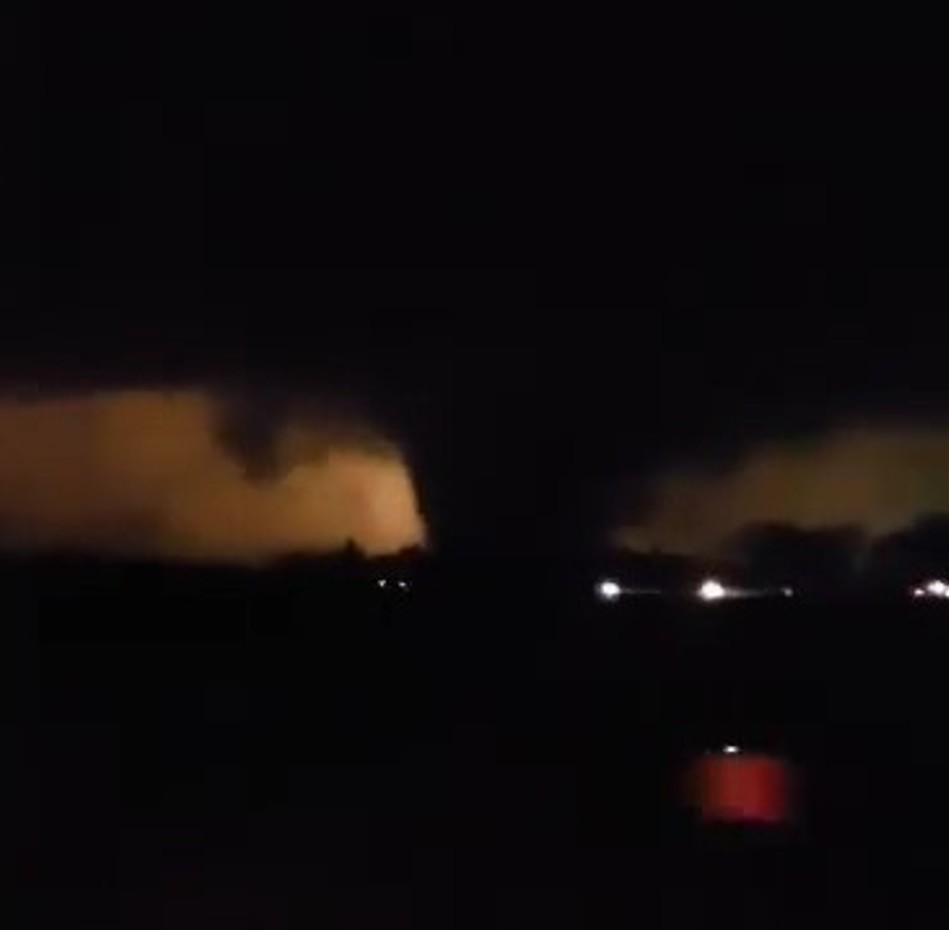
- The tornado as it struck Robinson.

Meteorological history
- Formed: March 31, 2023, 8:58 p.m. CDT (UTC−05:00)
- Dissipated: March 31, 2023, 10:33 p.m. EDT (UTC−04:00)
- Duration: 35 minutes

EF3 tornado
- on the Enhanced Fujita scale
- Highest winds: 165 mph (266 km/h)

Overall effects
- Casualties: 6 fatalities, 16 injuries
- Damage: ≥$18.160 million (2023 USD)

This strong, long-tracked tornado first touched down along County Highway 16 southwest of Ste. Marie in Jasper County, Illinois, and moved east-northeastward, causing sporadic EF0 tree damage. The tornado began to strengthen after it crossed into Crawford County, inflicting EF1 to EF2 damage. As it passed near Pierceburg, the tornado collapsed the roof structure of a machine shed, snapped wooden power poles, and sheared off the tops of trees. Northeast of there along County Highway 15, EF1 to EF2 damage continued to occur as two homes suffered major roof damage, with one of them having a portion of its roof uplifted. A nearby mobile home was torn in half with its debris strewn about 20 yards (18 m) in opposite directions, and additional trees had their tops sheared off. Past this area, the tornado threw a semi-trailer into a large machine shed, destroying it. Debris from the machine shed impacted an old, poorly anchored home, which had its exterior walls removed. The tornado strengthened further as it moved south of Stoy and Oil Center and through rural areas to the northeast, causing major EF2 to high-end EF3 damage. Damage survey teams initially had difficulty accessing this area due to flooding and utility roadblocks, but the area was eventually surveyed via the use of drone video and satellite imagery. Aerial video of this area showed that multiple homes and farmsteads were completely destroyed, including a couple of homes that swept from their foundations with debris scattered long distances across fields, while some other houses were left with only a few walls standing. Several people were left trapped under debris in basements and had to be rescued, outbuildings and mobile homes were obliterated, and many large trees were snapped. A large 1,000 gallon propane tank was also thrown out into a farm field, a Jeep was rolled, a lawn tractor was found wrapped around a tree, and aerial imagery revealed ground scouring along this segment of the path. As the tornado continued to the northeast, the presence of a large debris ball on radar prompted the issuance of a tornado emergency for Robinson as the tornado approached the south side of town.

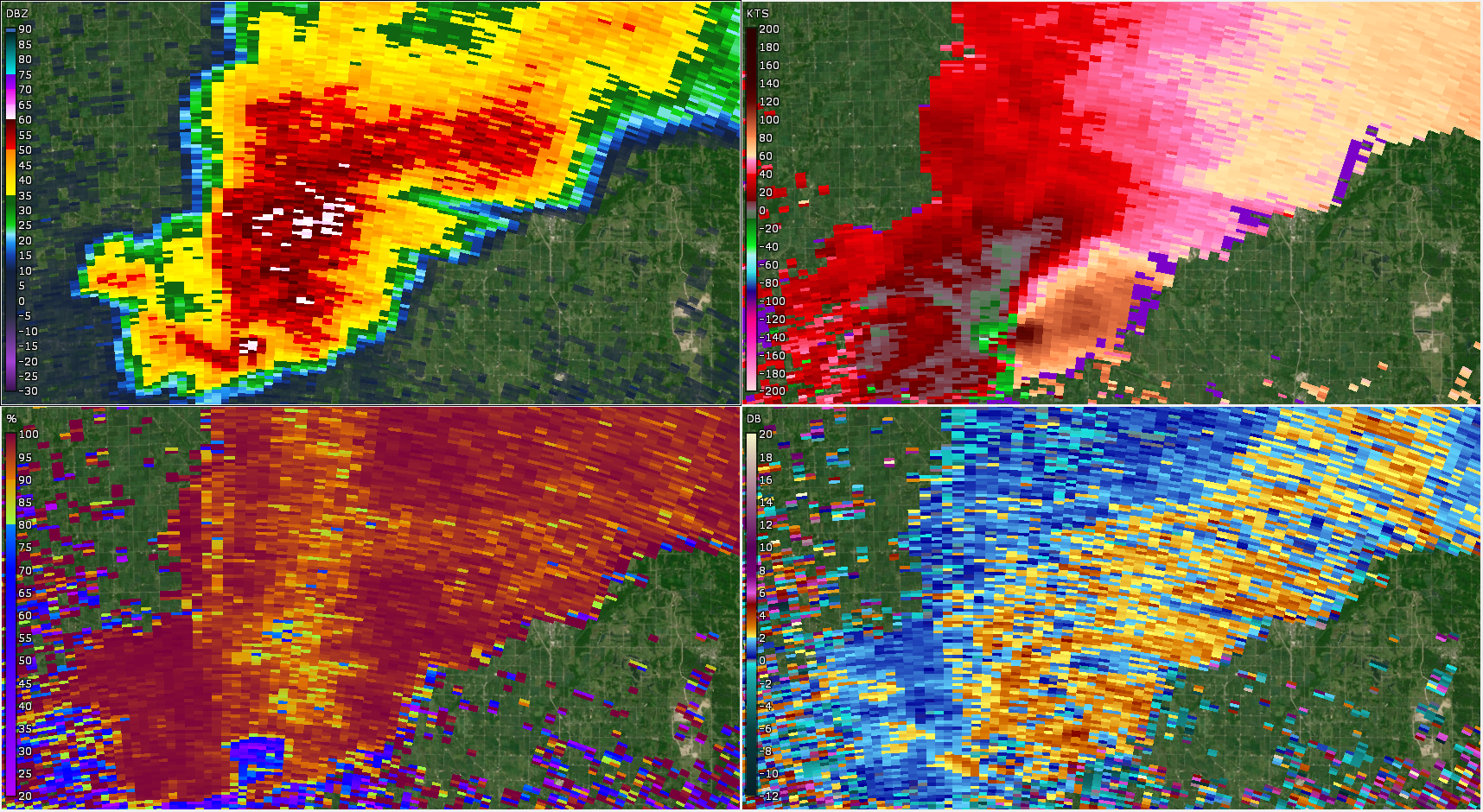
NEXRAD radar scan of the Robinson, Illinois - Sullivan, Indiana EF3 tornado.

Moving through the southern fringes of Robinson, the tornado maintained EF2 to EF3 strength as it continued northeastward completely destroying two mobile homes along County Highway 9, killing one person in each structure. Several other nearby homes sustained significant damage, and a large but poorly anchored two-story house near North While Tail Hollow was almost completely leveled at high-end EF3 intensity, leaving only one wall standing. Numerous trees and power poles were snapped in this area as well. Maintaining EF2 to EF3 intensity, the tornado then narrowly missed the Marathon Petroleum Oil Refinery just southeast of Robinson, obliterating several manufactured homes and outbuildings, partially destroying a frame home, and inflicting roof damage to other homes. Large trees were snapped and partially debarked in this area, and additional ground scouring was observed. It then impacted the eastern outskirts of Robinson near Gordon at high-end EF3 intensity, causing a fatality when it destroyed the H. L. Crisp Educational Center along IL 1. The two-story masonry building had most of its upper floor destroyed, while multiple walls collapsed on the first floor. Additional EF2 to high-end EF3 damage occurred nearby as a couple of homes and vehicles were destroyed nearby. One poorly anchored house was leveled at this location, and major damage to trees and power poles was observed. After causing EF2 damage to homes and trees as it crossed over IL 33, the tornado struck the Robinson Municipal Airport at high-end EF3 intensity. Multiple metal airplane hangars, which had rigid steel beam frames measuring greater than 18 inches (46 cm) in diameter, were completely destroyed, including some that were swept away. Multiple airplanes and several vehicles were thrown and destroyed, an outbuilding structure was also destroyed, and extensive damage to utility poles and a few homes occurred in this area. Several tractor-trailers and pieces of farm machinery were thrown and piled on top of one another as well. The tornado then weakened, but remained strong, causing a continuous path of EF1 to EF2 damage as it crossed County Highway 5 north of Palestine. Multiple homes had large sections of their roof structures removed, and large machine sheds suffered wall damage along this segment of the damage path. Heavy tree damage and ground scouring was also observed as the tornado approached the Wabash River.

The tornado then crossed the Wabash River into Sullivan County, Indiana, just north of Riverton, maintaining high-end EF1 to EF2 strength as it passed to the south of Merom. Multiple barns and outbuildings were completely demolished, farming equipment was tossed around, a residence sustained roof damage, and numerous large trees and power poles were snapped. The tornado continued to intensify as it passed through rural areas to the northwest of New Lebanon, where four metal truss electrical transmission towers were collapsed at EF3 intensity. EF2 to EF3 damage continued as the tornado moved to the northeast and approached the town of Sullivan. Just southwest of the town, three poorly anchored homes were severely damaged or destroyed, and a modular home was thrown at least 200 yards (180 m) and destroyed, killing the two occupants. A large trailer and several cars in this area were also thrown, outbuildings were obliterated, and hundreds of trees were snapped. Crossing US 150/US 41 into the southern part of Sullivan, the tornado inflicted widespread EF2 to EF3 damage, with many homes and other structures being severely damaged or destroyed. Numerous homes in town sustained total loss of their roofs and exterior walls, and several poorly anchored homes were swept from their foundations and completely destroyed, with debris strewn throughout residential areas. A few businesses, a VFW hall, a metal shop building, and several outbuilding structures were also destroyed. A food pantry was damaged as well, and major tree damage occurred throughout the south side of town. Intensifying further to high-end EF3 strength, the tornado crossed East Center Road at the southeast edge of town, where several poorly anchored homes were swept away and destroyed, including one modular home that was thrown at least 150 yards (140 m), killing one of the occupants while injuring the other. A few other homes sustained roof and exterior wall loss and multiple vehicles were tossed, one of which was thrown 300 feet (91 m). The tornado then quickly weakened as it exited Sullivan and continued to the east-northeast, overturning a dump truck and damaging trees in wooded areas before dissipating to the east of the town. Damage along this final portion of the path was rated EF0 to EF1. The tornado had a total path length of 40.86 miles (65.76 km) and reached a peak width of 660 yards (600 m). It caused six fatalities, and injured 16 other people.

=== Bethel Springs–Adamsville–Hookers Bend–Hohenwald, Tennessee ===
Bethel Springs–Adamsville–Hookers Bend–Hohenwald, Tennessee
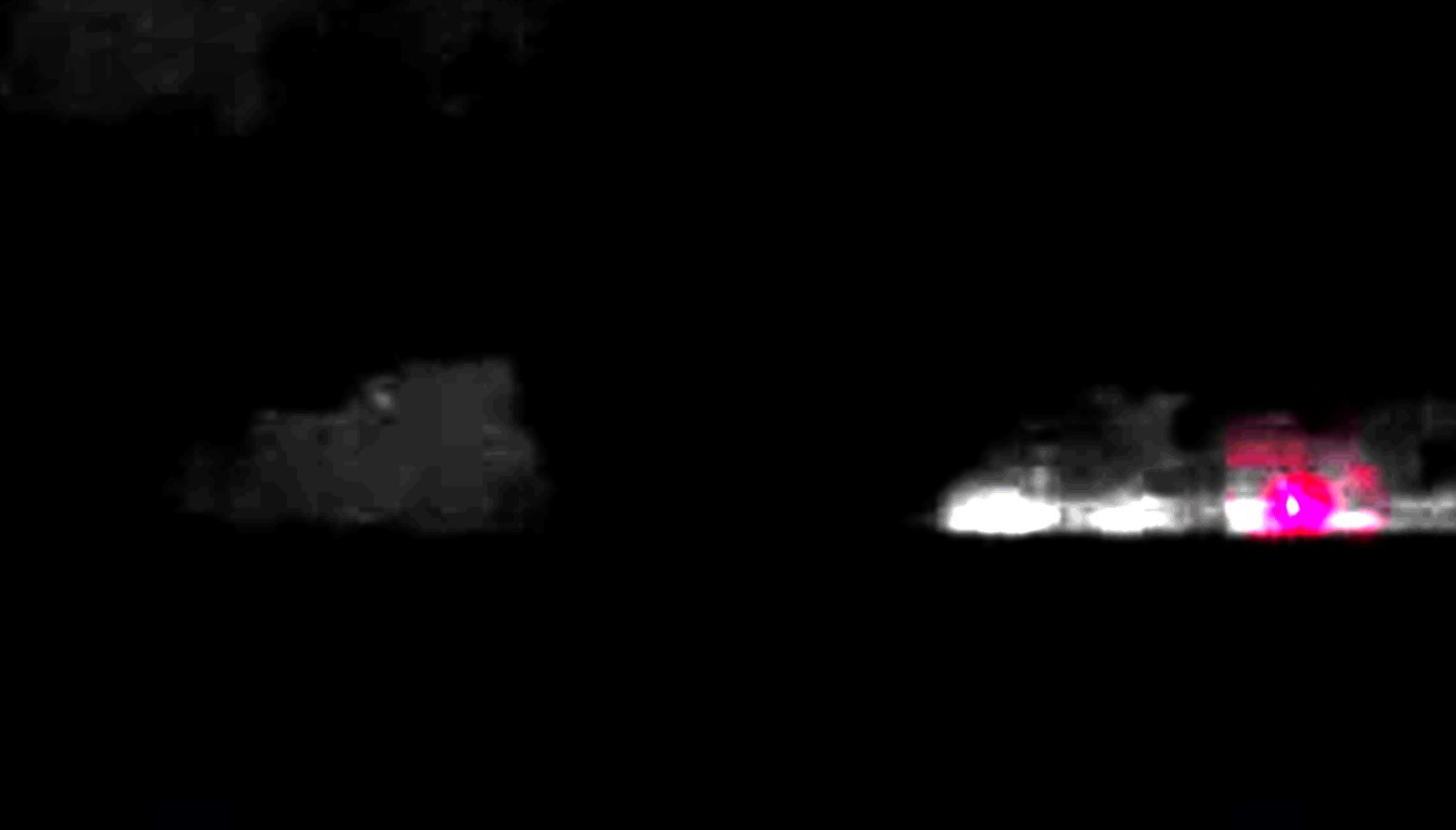
- The tornado as it tracked through areas near Bethel Springs.

Meteorological history
- Formed: March 31, 2023, 11:04 p.m. CDT (UTC−05:00)
- Dissipated: April 1, 2023, 12:37 a.m. CDT (UTC−05:00)
- Duration: 1 hour, 33 minutes

EF3 tornado
- on the Enhanced Fujita scale
- Highest winds: 155 mph (249 km/h)

Overall effects
- Casualties: 9 fatalities, 23 injuries
- Damage: $25.475 million (2023 USD)

This deadly and long-tracked EF3 wedge tornado first touched down south of Hornsby in Hardeman County. It moved eastward at EF1 strength, downing trees and inflicting minor structural damage before crossing into McNairy County. Upon entering the county, the tornado continued to down trees, snapped power poles, and caused minor damage to a house. It then strengthened to EF2 intensity as it moved along Rose Creek Road, where widespread significant tree damage occurred, and multiple houses were severely damaged. A poorly anchored single-wide manufactured home was also obliterated, killing all four occupants. The tornado then briefly weakened back to EF1 strength, crossing US 64/SR 15 northwest of Selmer. Widespread tree damage and sporadic roof damage to homes was noted in this area, and several utility poles along US 64/SR 15 were snapped. The tornado then reintensified to EF2 strength again as it approached and crossed US 45/SR 5, snapping power poles and large trees. A church along the highway had its foyer windows blown out, and some damage to the siding was also observed. A nearby metal building was destroyed, and a couple of homes were damaged to a lesser degree. The tornado maintained EF2 strength as it moved through the southern edge of Bethel Springs, where multiple houses were heavily damaged, and one was shifted off its foundation. Major tree damage occurred, while a semi-truck and vehicles were flipped or moved. This area of the path had been hit by a low-end EF2 tornado just two hours earlier, and a few properties were struck by both tornadoes.

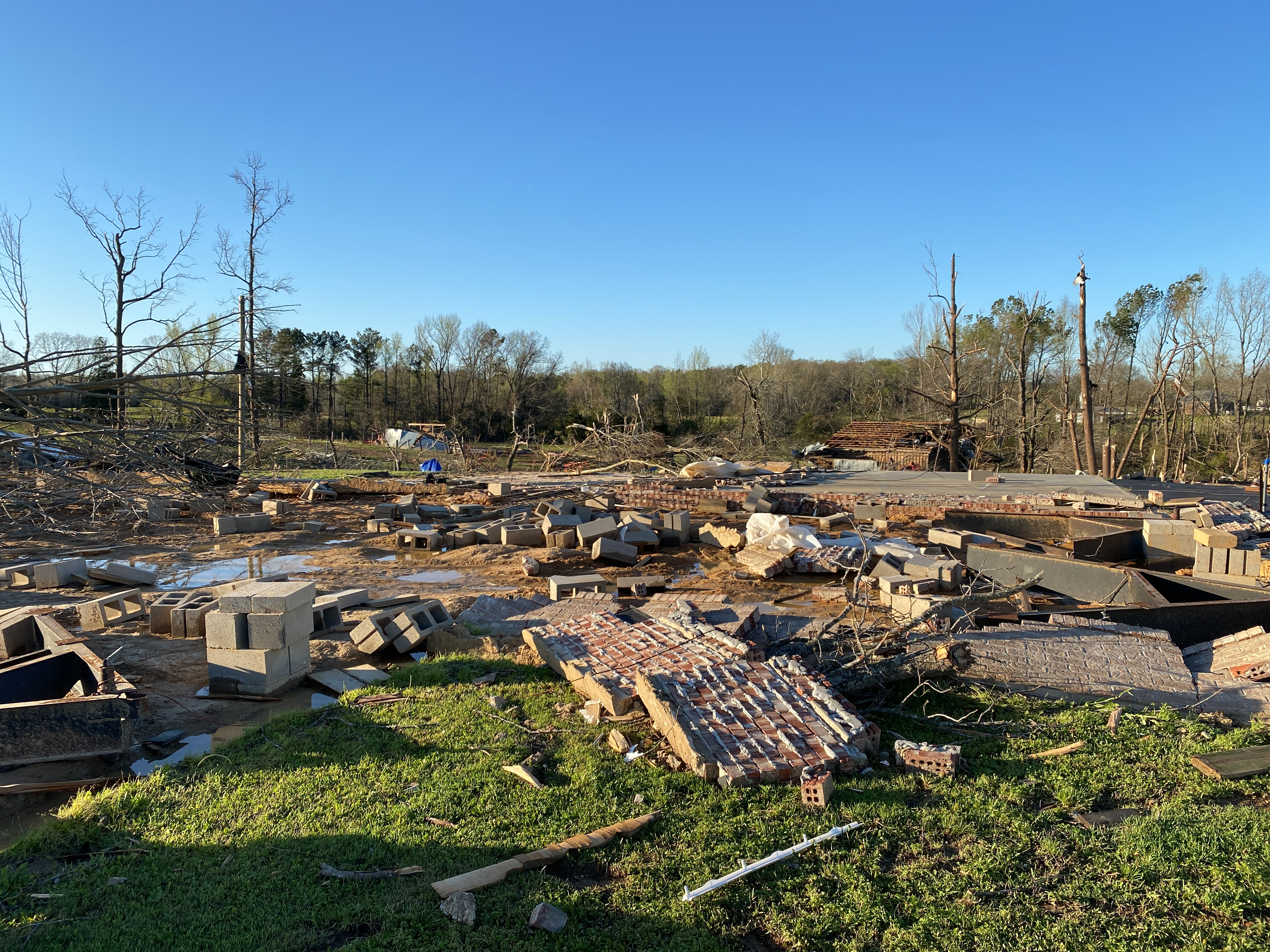
Low-end EF3 damage to a mobile home at the north edge of Adamsville.

After exiting Bethel Springs, the tornado again briefly weakened to EF1 strength as it moved east-northeastward, damaging trees and utility poles. As it moved along Bethel-Purdy Road, it strengthened to high-end EF2 intensity as multiple mobile homes were obliterated, a couple of which had their metal frames wrapped around trees. Some frame homes were also badly damaged, one of which had roof and exterior wall loss. The tornado briefly reached EF3 intensity as it crossed Hurst Lane and Purdy-Beauty Hill Road in the small community of Purdy, where the Purdy Community Center was completely destroyed and reduced to its concrete slab foundation. Some nearby houses were heavily damaged, and asphalt was scoured from a road in this area. EF2 damage to trees continued before the tornado reached EF3 intensity southeast of the Good Hope community, crossing Old Stage Road and SR 224. Several homes had their roofs and exterior walls removed, one house had its entire second story ripped off, and a large but poorly anchored home was completely swept away, with only its concrete foundation slab remaining. A block foundation home was also swept away and obliterated, large metal power poles were bent to the ground, a semi-trailer was tossed, and four fatalities occurred in this area. The tornado then caused additional EF2 damage to trees and damaged a few homes, before striking the northern outskirts of Adamsville at low-end EF3 intensity. As it crossed SR 22 in this area, the tornado caused major damage to trees, utility poles, and homes, including some homes that were destroyed and left with only their interior walls standing. A mobile home was also swept away and destroyed, a cell tower was toppled to the ground, debris was strewn across fields, and one person was killed in this area.

The tornado then weakened some as it moved into Hardin County, causing EF1 to EF2 damage to homes and trees as it crossed SR 69 and approached Hookers Bend. The tornado then strengthened again as it entered Hookers Bend, causing EF2 to EF3 damage in the small community. A manufactured home was completely destroyed, and another residence was blown off its block foundation and flipped upside-down onto its roof. A large barn was destroyed, a cabin-type home was severely damaged, and countless large hardwood trees were snapped and partially debarked. Continuing east-northeastward, the tornado then weakened and caused EF1 to EF2 damage to homes, outbuildings, and trees as it crossed the Tennessee River twice near Cerro Gordo. The tornado weakened further just beyond this area, as homes and trees were damaged at EF1 intensity as it moved through New Harmony. The tornado reintensified to EF2 intensity as it moved through Crossroads and snapped or uprooted numerous trees. A home in this area was also slid completely off its block foundation and had severe siding and window damage. The tornado then moved east-northeastward into Wayne County.

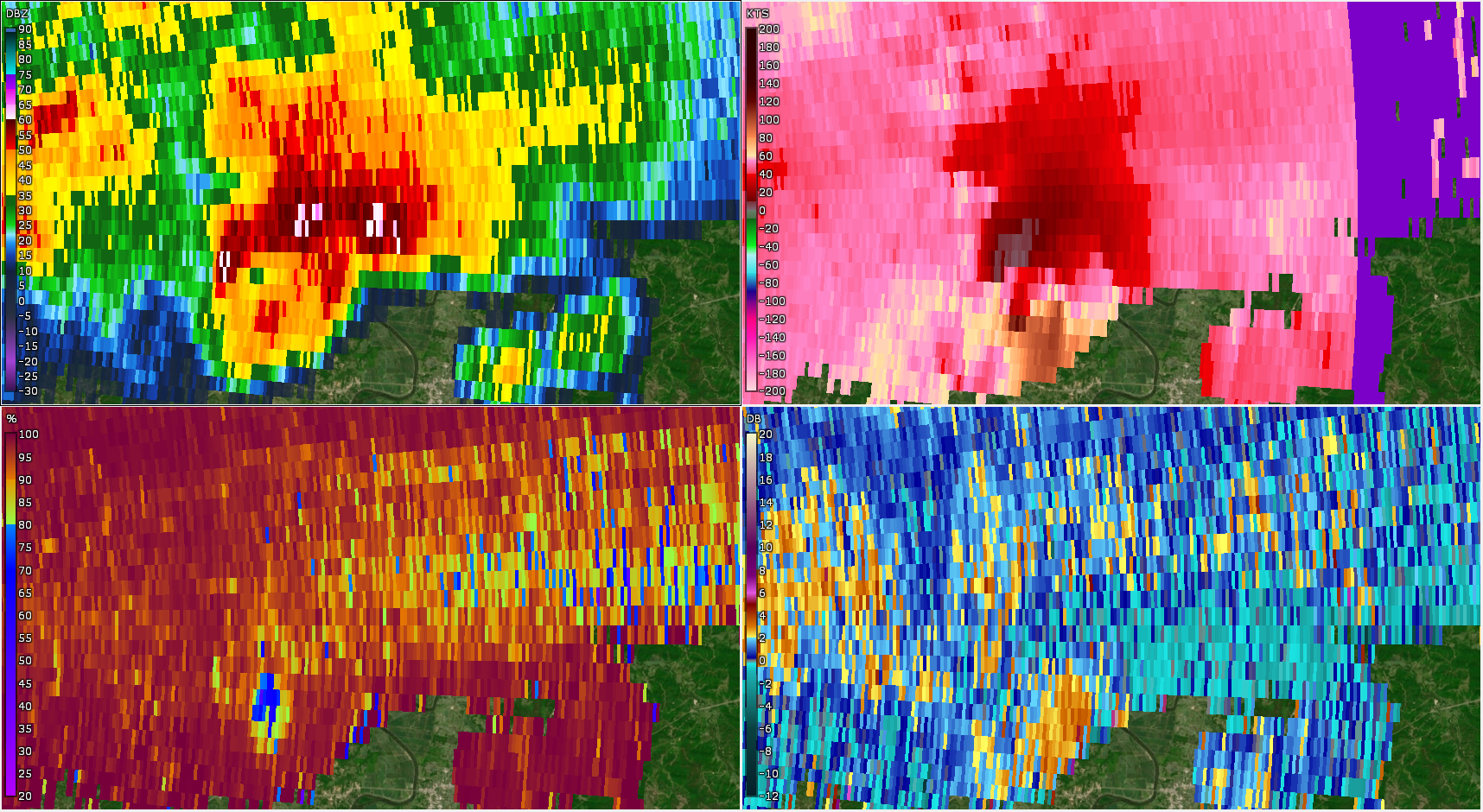
NEXRAD radar scan of the Bethel Springs, Tennessee EF3 tornado.

After moving into Wayne County, the tornado crossed US 641/SR 114 to the south of Clifton while maintaining EF2 strength. Several homes had their roofs partially ripped off or heavily damaged, while outbuildings were heavily damaged or destroyed, including some that were obliterated and swept away. A mobile home was also damaged, and dozens of trees blown down. The tornado then continued northeastward, snapping and uprooting numerous trees before reaching high-end EF2 intensity and striking Leatherwood along SR 228. A few small and poorly constructed homes were leveled in Leatherwood, mobile homes were swept away and completely destroyed, while other homes suffered heavy roof damage. Many trees were snapped or uprooted, and some barns and outbuildings were damaged or destroyed well. Two people were injured in this area, one of whom was critically injured and was airlifted to a hospital. The tornado then weakened to EF1 intensity as it crossed SR 13 and moved northeastward through forested areas as it passed near Topsy and Ashland, snapping and uprooting hundreds of trees. The tornado then entered Lewis County at EF1 strength and crossed SR 99, continuing to snap and uproot hundreds of trees. Several homes and outbuildings were also damaged as it crossed over multiple roads, including Natchez Trace Parkway and SR 20 southeast of Hohenwald. The tornado then weakened further to EF0 strength, damaging some more trees before dissipating as it moved along Tiger Bennett Road west of Mount Pleasant.

Some of the debris from the tornado was carried long distances. This included a paper phone bill from Wayne County that was found in a yard 101 miles (163 km) away in Wilson County. A paper check from Adamsville that was found 122 miles (196 km) away in Franklin, as well. The tornado remained on the ground for 85.89 miles (138.23 km) and reached a peak width of 1,400 yards (1,300 m). Along with the nine fatalities, 23 other people were injured.

== Non-tornadic effects ==
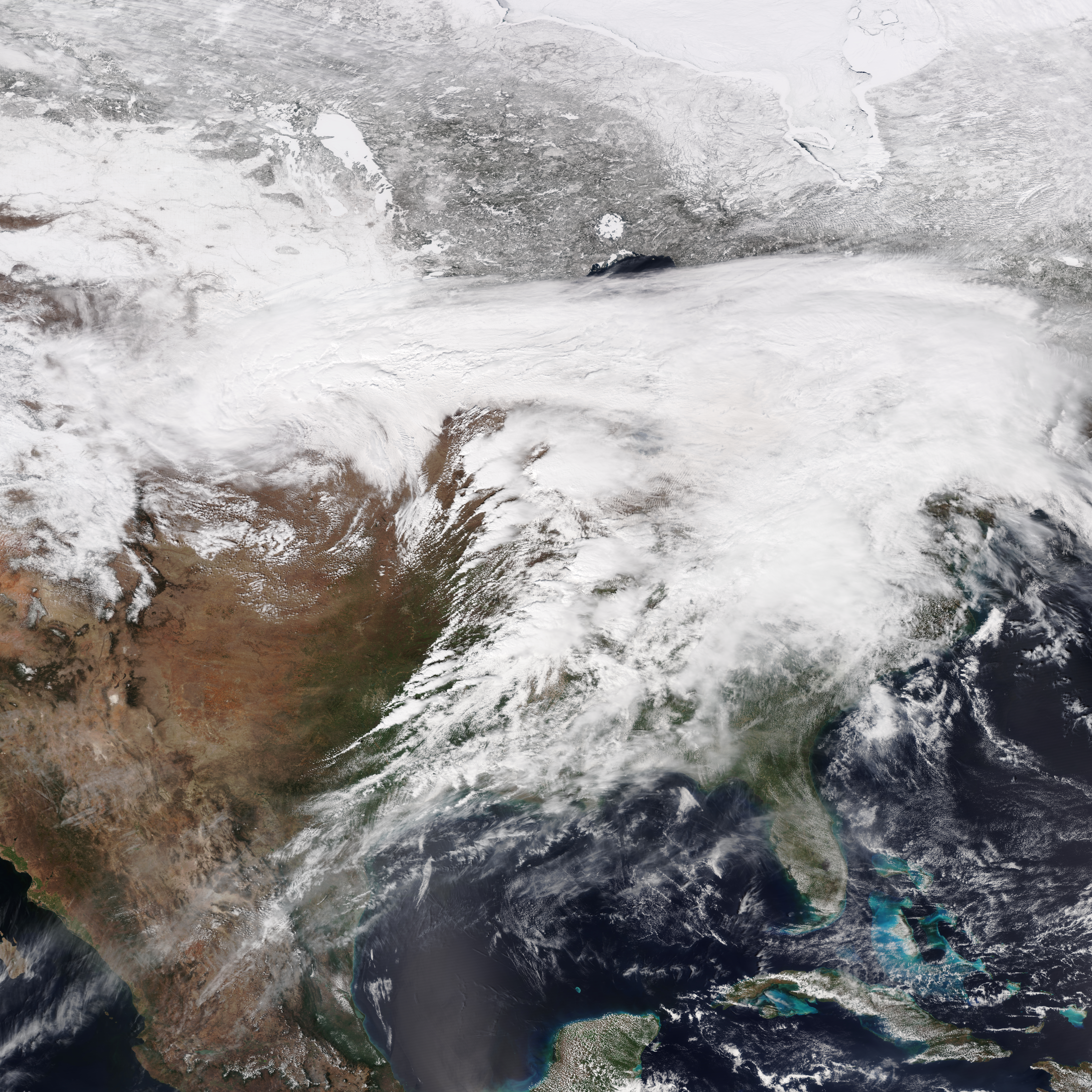
Satellite image of the storm system responsible for the tornado outbreak that occurred on March 31 through April 1, 2023

Severe thunderstorms affected a widespread area across the Mississippi Valley. Multiple locations throughout the Plains and Midwest saw 90-mile-per-hour (140 km/h) winds, which caused significant damage to roofs and buildings. These storms were deemed to be life-threatening by the National Weather Service (NWS). One person died in Leavittsburg, Ohio, when a tree fell on their home.

On the back side of the storm system, the threat of strong winds and dry air led to the Storm Prediction Center (SPC) issuing a "Critical Fire Weather Area" for parts of the Central and Southern Plains. At least 97 destructive wildfires ignited across the state of Oklahoma on March 31, with at least 3,000 acres (1,200 hectares) burned in Logan County alone. Winds up to 65 mph (105 km/h) damaged power lines, leaving 16,481 customers without electricity.

=== Tennessee ===
Three people died in Oakhaven, a suburb of Memphis, when a tree fell on their home. In Rockwood, one person died when the roof of a dugout at the Brillo Miller Sports Complex was blown off and fell on her. Another person died on April 1 when they were crushed by a tree while clearing debris in Henry County.

Following the passage of severe weather on April 1, damaging non-thunderstorm winds impacted East Tennessee. These winds downed trees and power lines, leaving roughly 24,000 homes without electricity in Knox County. Portions of US 441 through the Great Smoky Mountains National Park closed. In Sevier County, brushfires fanned by winds up to 76 mph (122 km/h) burned small areas. Similarly, 20 brushfires ignited from downed power lines in Knox County, and were quickly extinguished.

=== Blizzard ===
A major blizzard associated with this system brought heavy snow to the Northern Midwest. 14 inches (36 cm) of snow fell in Pierre, South Dakota, while up to 12 inches (30 cm) fell in the Twin Cities. Heavier snow totals were seen in Northern Wisconsin with reports of 16 inches (41 cm) near Hazelhurst. Multiple places in the Upper Peninsula of Michigan also had over a foot of snow. The snowstorm was enough to push the Twin Cities in Minnesota to their 3rd snowiest winter on record, where 8.5 inches (22 cm) of snow fell. In the Twin Cities metro, a 20-year old nest fell out of a tree due to the snow on April 2, killing a baby eagle. Across Minnesota and western Wisconsin, over 215,000 customers lost power due to the snowstorm.

== Impact and aftermath ==
Outbreak death toll
State	Fatalities
Alabama	1
Arkansas	5
Delaware	1
Illinois	4
Indiana	5
Mississippi	1
Tennessee	10
Total	27
Only tornado-related deaths are included

At least 100,000 customers in Illinois and 65,000 customers in Arkansas lost power. Several Amtrak trains were also delayed due to the severe weather as well. The City of New Orleans in particular was delayed for almost 14 hours due to downed trees along its route while the California Zephyr was delayed by 9.5 hours on March 31. Multiple Lincoln Service and Illini and Saluki trains were cancelled on April 1, and the Texas Eagle was terminated and forced to originate in St. Louis due to the severe weather as well. Several highways also closed down due to the storm, including I-57 between Paxton and Rantoul, Illinois. Chicago O'Hare International Airport instituted a ground stop during the storm.

Ahead of the severe weather outbreak on March 31st, Kentucky Governor Andy Beshear and Missouri Governor Mike Parson declared a state of emergency for their respective states.

Following the fatal EF3 tornado in Wynne, Arkansas, on March 31, the city opened several shelters for displaced people. State Governor Sarah Huckabee Sanders ordered the deployment of 100 Arkansas National Guard troops and released $250,000 in emergency funds for relief efforts. Sanders also declared a state of emergency.

Following an EF2 tornado in Tennessee, Rutherford County Mayor Joe Carr reached out to Governor Bill Lee to request a state of emergency declaration after a tornado "wiped out" Readyville early on April 1.

An EF3 tornado in Indiana led to McCormick's Creek State Park shutting down.

In New Jersey, Six Flags Great Adventure was shut down from April 2 through April 4 as a result of severe thunderstorms and tornadoes moving through the area.

== See also ==
- Weather of 2023
- List of North American tornadoes and tornado outbreaks
- List of F4 and EF4 tornadoes (2020–present)
- List of F3, EF3, and IF3 tornadoes (2020–present)
- List of tornado outbreaks by outbreak intensity score
- List of Storm Prediction Center high risk days
- List of United States tornadoes in March 2023
- List of United States tornadoes from April to May 2023
- Tornado records
- Tornado outbreak sequence of April 1996 – An outbreak that also affected large areas of the Mississippi Valley
- Tornado outbreak of November 27–28, 2005 – Another outbreak that caused serious damage in the Little Rock metropolitan area
- 2020 Easter tornado outbreak – Another prolific tornado outbreak in the Southeastern United States
- Hurricane Ida tornado outbreak – Another outbreak that caused major damage in the Northeastern United States
- Tornado outbreak of March 13–16, 2025 - Another high risk outbreak that resulted in significant damage in the Southeastern US that occurred about 2 years after.
