= Swift, Tennessee =

Hamlet in Tennessee, US

Coordinates: 35°20′38″N 88°08′28″W

Swift is a hamlet in Hardin County, Tennessee, on Tennessee State Route 128 at latitude 35.344 and longitude -88.141 between Cerro Gordo and Clifton, at an elevation of 518 feet. Swift appears on the Hookers Bend U.S. Geological Survey map.

In the past, it has been the site of a post office and a school.

== Notes ==
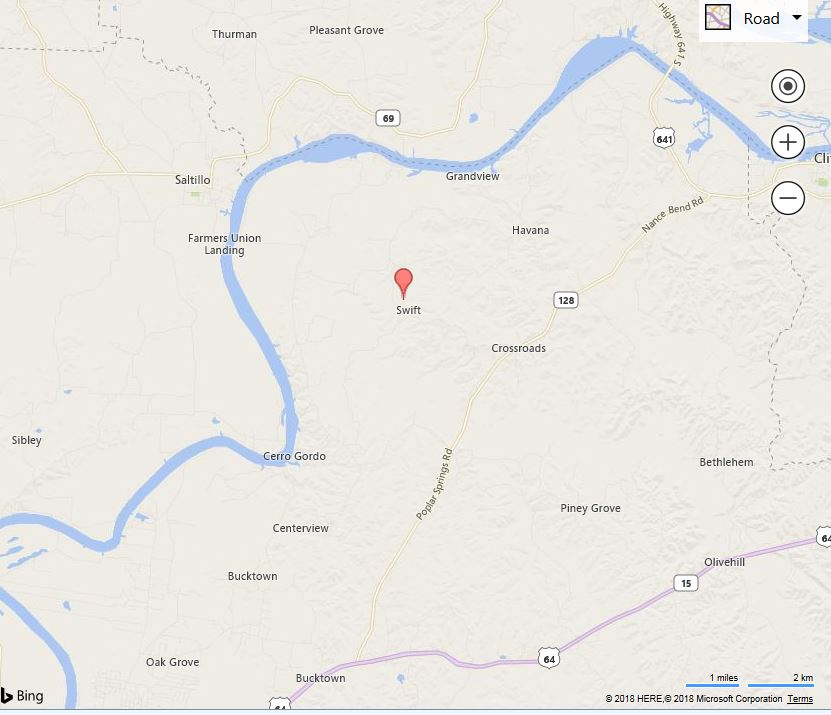
Map showing the location of the community of Swift, Hardin County, Tennessee
