= Hinkle, Tennessee =

- Unincorporated community
- Location within Tennessee Location within the United States
- Coordinates: 35°24′28″N 88°18′01″W
- Country: United States
- State: Tennessee
- County: Hardin
- Elevation: 486 ft (148 m)
- Time zone: UTC-6 (Central (CST))
  - Summer (DST): UTC-5 (CDT)
- Area code: 731
- GNIS feature ID: 1287891

Hinkle is an unincorporated community in Hardin County, Tennessee. Hinkle is located on Tennessee State Route 421, south of Sardis.
