= Tennessee State Route 421 =

State highway in Tennessee, United States

State Route 421
- TN 421 highlighted in red

Route information
- Maintained by TDOT
- Length: 5.4 mi (8.7 km)

Major junctions
- South end: SR 69 in Lebanon
- North end: SR 104 / SR 201 in Sardis

Location
- Country: United States
- State: Tennessee
- Counties: Hardin, Henderson

Highway system
- Tennessee State Routes; Interstate; US; State
← US 421	→ SR 422

State Route 421 (SR 421) is a 5.4-mile-long (8.7 km) north-south state highway in Hardin and Henderson counties of eastern West Tennessee. It connects the community of Lebanon with the town of Sardis via Hinkle.

== Route description ==
SR 421 begins in Lebanon at an intersection with SR 69. It heads north through wooded areas to pass through Hinkle before crossing into Henderson County and immediately enters the Sardis city limits. The highway makes a couple of sharp right turns before passing by Sardis City Park and entering downtown. SR 421 then comes to an end at an intersection between SR 104 and SR 201. The entire route of SR 421 is a two-lane highway, with the Henderson County portion known as Hinkle Road.

== Major intersections ==
County	Location	mi	km	Destinations	Notes
Hardin	Lebanon	0.0	0.0	SR 69 – Milledgeville, Saltillo	Southern terminus
Henderson	Sardis	5.4	8.7	SR 201 south (Henderson Road) SR 104 west / SR 201 north – Lexington, Scotts Hill SR 104 east – Saltillo	Northern terminus
1.000 mi = 1.609 km; 1.000 km = 0.621 mi
