= Old Town, Tennessee =

Old Town, Tennessee may refer to:

- the former settlement of Hardinville, Tennessee, which by the outbreak of the U.S. Civil War had been renamed Old Town
- any of the three places described in Old Town (Franklin, Tennessee)
