= Bucktown =

Bucktown may refer to:

== Places in the United States ==
- Bucktown, Indiana
- Bucktown, Maryland
- Bucktown, Pennsylvania
- Bucktown, Tennessee
- Bucktown, Chicago, a neighborhood in Logan Square, Chicago, Illinois
- Bucktown, Davenport, a historic area of Davenport, Iowa
- Bucktown, an area of New Orleans, Louisiana, near the 17th Street Canal
- Dunmore, Pennsylvania, formerly Bucktown

== Other uses ==
- Bucktown (film), a 1975 American blaxploitation film
- "Bucktown" (song), by Smif-N-Wessun, 1994
