= Grandview, Tennessee =

Grandview, Tennessee may refer to the following places in Tennessee:

- Grandview, Greene County, Tennessee
- Grandview, Hardin County, Tennessee
- Grandview, Knox County, Tennessee
- Grandview, Putnam County, Tennessee
- Grandview, Rhea County, Tennessee
