= Pyburn Bluff =

Cliff in Hardin County, Tennessee, United States

Coordinates: 35.0750845°N 88.2336502°W

Pyburn Bluff is a cliff on the Tennessee River in Hardin County, Tennessee. The elevation of Pyburn Bluff is 476 feet (145 m). The cliff has the name of Jacob Pyburn, proprietor of a ferry at this spot.
