= Earle Dickson =

American engineer (1892–1961)

- Earle Dickson as a young man
- Born: October 9, 1892; Grandview, Tennessee, United States
- Died: September 21, 1961 (aged 68); Kitchener, Ontario, Canada
- Spouse: Josephine Knight
- Engineering career
- Institutions: Johnson & Johnson
- Projects: BAND-AID adhesive bandages

Earle Dickson (October 10, 1892—September 21, 1961) was an American inventor best known for inventing adhesive bandages in the US. He lived in Highland Park, New Jersey, for a large portion of his life.

== Biography ==
Dickson was a cotton buyer at the Johnson & Johnson company. His wife, Josephine Knight, often cut herself while doing housework and cooking. Dickson found that gauze placed on a wound with tape did not stay on her active fingers. In 1920, he placed squares of gauze in intervals on a roll of tape, held in place with crinoline. James Wood Johnson, his boss, liked the idea and put it into production. In 1924, Johnson & Johnson installed machines to mass-produce the once handmade bandages. At first, the product sold poorly, with only $3000 worth of bandaids sold because individuals did not know how to use them. To promote sales, they sent out salesmen to show the people how to use them, and sales eventually rose. Following the commercial success of his design, Dickson was promoted to vice president.
