= Winn Springs, Tennessee =

- Unincorporated community
- Location within Tennessee Location within the United States
- Coordinates: 35°00′39″N 88°12′35″W
- Country: United States
- State: Tennessee
- County: Hardin
- Elevation: 554 ft (169 m)
- Time zone: UTC-6 (Central (CST))
  - Summer (DST): UTC-5 (CDT)
- Area code: 731
- GNIS feature ID: 1304637

Winn Springs is an unincorporated community in Hardin County, Tennessee. Winn Springs is located on the west bank of the Tennessee River just north of the Mississippi and Alabama borders. The community is east of Red Sulphur Springs.
