= Big Ivy, Tennessee =

- Unincorporated community
- Location within Tennessee Location within the United States
- Coordinates: 35°07′03″N 88°03′02″W
- Country: United States
- State: Tennessee
- County: Hardin
- Elevation: 541 ft (165 m)
- Time zone: UTC-6 (Central (CST))
  - Summer (DST): UTC-5 (CDT)
- Area code: 731
- GNIS feature ID: 1314678

Big Ivy is an unincorporated community in Hardin County, Tennessee. Big Ivy is located southeast of Savannah and north of the Alabama border.
