= Thompson Crossroads, Tennessee =

- Unincorporated community
- Location within Tennessee Location within the United States
- Coordinates: 35°15′43″N 88°02′57″W
- Country: United States
- State: Tennessee
- County: Hardin
- Elevation: 541 ft (165 m)
- Time zone: UTC-6 (Central (CST))
  - Summer (DST): UTC-5 (CDT)
- Area code: 731
- GNIS feature ID: 1314394

Thompson Crossroads is an unincorporated community in Hardin County, Tennessee. It is located 11 miles northeast of Savannah and 18 miles north of the Alabama border.
