= Shady Grove, Hardin County, Tennessee =

- Unincorporated community
- Location within Tennessee Location within the United States
- Coordinates: 35°23′47″N 88°14′56″W
- Country: United States
- State: Tennessee
- County: Hardin
- Elevation: 459 ft (140 m)
- Time zone: UTC-6 (Central (CST))
  - Summer (DST): UTC-5 (CDT)
- Area code: 731
- GNIS feature ID: 1315901

Shady Grove is an unincorporated community in Hardin County, Tennessee, United States. Shady Grove is located along Tennessee State Route 104 2.6 miles (4.2 km) west-northwest of Saltillo.
