= Oak Grove, Hardin County, Tennessee =

Community in the United States

- Unincorporated community
- Location within Tennessee Location within the United States
- Coordinates: 35°16′28″N 88°13′47″W
- Country: United States
- State: Tennessee
- County: Hardin
- Elevation: 417 ft (127 m)
- Time zone: UTC-6 (Central (CST))
  - Summer (DST): UTC-5 (CDT)
- Area code: 731
- GNIS feature ID: 1296054

Oak Grove is an unincorporated community in Hardin County, Tennessee. Oak Grove is located north of Savannah and is near the east bank of the Tennessee River.
