= Caney Hollow, Tennessee =

- Unincorporated community
- Location within Tennessee Location within the United States
- Coordinates: 35°00′16″N 88°13′02″W
- Country: United States
- State: Tennessee
- County: Hardin
- Elevation: 443 ft (135 m)
- Time zone: UTC-6 (Central (CST))
  - Summer (DST): UTC-5 (CDT)
- Area code: 731
- GNIS feature ID: 1279577

Caney Hollow is an unincorporated community in Hardin County, Tennessee, United States. Caney Hollow is located on the west bank of Pickwick Lake just north of the Mississippi and Alabama borders.
