= Grandview, Hardin County, Tennessee =

- Unincorporated community
- Location within Tennessee Location within the United States
- Coordinates: 35°22′54″N 88°07′04″W
- Country: United States
- State: Tennessee
- County: Hardin
- Elevation: 440 ft (130 m)
- Time zone: UTC-6 (Central (CST))
  - Summer (DST): UTC-5 (CDT)
- Area code: 731
- GNIS feature ID: 1315141

Grandview is an unincorporated community in Hardin County, Tennessee, United States. Grandview is located on the Tennessee River 13.1 miles (21.1 km) northeast of Savannah.
