= Cerro Gordo, Tennessee =

Unincorporated community in Hardin County, Tennessee, US

- Unincorporated community
- Location within Tennessee Location within the United States
- Coordinates: 35°18′13″N 88°10′50″W
- Country: United States
- State: Tennessee
- County: Hardin
- Elevation: 407 ft (124 m)
- Time zone: UTC-6 (Central (CST))
  - Summer (DST): UTC-5 (CDT)
- Area code: 731
- GNIS feature ID: 1305836

Cerro Gordo is an unincorporated community in Hardin County, Tennessee. Cerro Gordo is located on the east bank of the Tennessee River, north of Savannah. It is most notable as the May 1816 landing site of the Hardin Expedition. Cerro Gordo is Spanish for fat hill.

== The Hardin Expedition ==
Twenty-six settlers, in two parties, struck out from Knoxville in late spring of 1816 bound for the general area which would eventually become Savannah. The first party came by boat, landing in May at "the easteward curve" of the Tennessee River. at Cerro Gordo. The second, and larger party, had traversed overland and suffered many delays. This second party was led by Joseph Hardin, Jr., son of Col. Joseph Hardin who had, before his death, accumulated several land grants to the area as rewards for his Revolutionary service. Joseph, Jr., as well as his brother, James Hardin (founder of the rival settlement of Hardinville, at modern-day Old Town, located on Hardin's Creek), executed land grants in the area. Both had fought alongside their father in the war and had been likewise rewarded with land patents.

Additional settlers from the initial expedition were dispatched almost immediately to establish a nearby community downriver at Saltillo.
