= Grandview, Knox County, Tennessee =

- Unincorporated community
- Location within Tennessee Location within the United States
- Coordinates: 35°54′33″N 83°51′31″W
- Country: United States
- State: Tennessee
- County: Knox

Government
  - Type: County commission
  - Mayor: Glenn Jacobs (R)
  - Commissioners: Andy Fox (R) (District 9); Kim Frazier (R) (At-Large); Larsen Jay (R) (At-Large)
- Elevation: 1,040 ft (320 m)
- Time zone: UTC-5 (Eastern (EST))
  - Summer (DST): UTC-4 (EDT)
- Area code: 865
- GNIS feature ID: 1285827

Grandview is an unincorporated community in Knox County, Tennessee, United States. Grandview is 5 miles (8.0 km) southeast of downtown Knoxville.
