= Bucktown, Tennessee =

- Unincorporated community
- Location within Tennessee Location within the United States
- Coordinates: 35°16′12″N 88°11′42″W
- Country: United States
- State: Tennessee
- County: Hardin
- Elevation: 420 ft (130 m)
- Time zone: UTC-6 (Central (CST))
  - Summer (DST): UTC-5 (CDT)
- Area code: 731
- GNIS feature ID: 1278890

Bucktown is an unincorporated community in Hardin County, Tennessee. Bucktown is located northeast of Savannah.
