= Sardis, Tennessee =

- Town
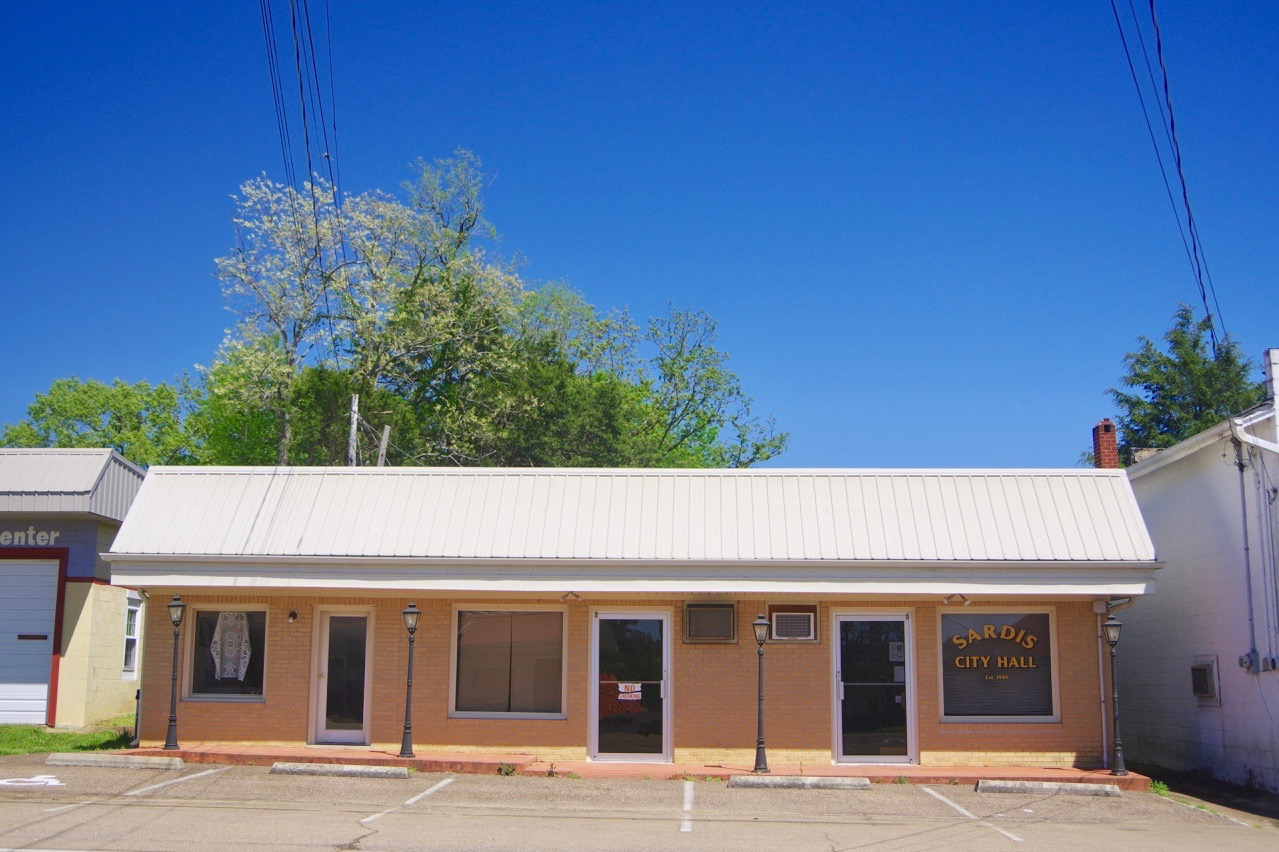
- Sardis town hall, April 2019

- Location of Sardis in Henderson County, Tennessee.
- Coordinates: 35°26′34″N 88°17′29″W
- Country: United States
- State: Tennessee
- County: Henderson

Area
  - Total: 2.50 sq mi (6.47 km^{2})
  - Land: 2.50 sq mi (6.47 km^{2})
  - Water: 0 sq mi (0.00 km^{2})
- Elevation: 515 ft (157 m)

Population (2020)
  - Total: 414
  - Density: 165.6/sq mi (63.94/km^{2})
- Time zone: UTC-6 (Central (CST))
  - Summer (DST): UTC-5 (CDT)
- ZIP code: 38371
- Area code: 731
- FIPS code: 47-66660
- GNIS feature ID: 1300789

Sardis is a town in Henderson County, Tennessee, United States. As of the 2020 census, Sardis had a population of 414.

The community was named after a Methodist church grounds near the site.

== Geography ==
Sardis is located at 35°26′34″N 88°17′29″W (35.442639, -88.291280).

According to the United States Census Bureau, the town has a total area of 2.4 square miles (6.2 km^{2}), all land.

== Demographics ==
Historical population
Census	Pop.	Note	%±
1910	435		—
1920	419		−3.7%
1950	299		—
1960	274		−8.4%
1970	350		27.7%
1980	301		−14.0%
1990	305		1.3%
2000	445		45.9%
2010	381		−14.4%
2020	414		8.7%

As of the census of 2000, there were 445 people, 186 households, and 129 families residing in the town. The population density was 188.2 inhabitants per square mile (72.7/km^{2}). There were 211 housing units at an average density of 89.3 per square mile (34.5/km^{2}). The racial makeup of the town was 99.10% White, 0.45% Native American, and 0.45% from two or more races. Hispanic or Latino of any race were 0.90% of the population.

There were 186 households, out of which 26.3% had children under the age of 18 living with them, 56.5% were married couples living together, 9.7% had a female householder with no husband present, and 30.6% were non-families. 29.0% of all households were made up of individuals, and 20.4% had someone living alone who was 65 years of age or older. The average household size was 2.39 and the average family size was 2.96.

In the town, the population was spread out, with 22.7% under the age of 18, 6.7% from 18 to 24, 25.4% from 25 to 44, 23.1% from 45 to 64, and 22.0% who were 65 years of age or older. The median age was 42 years. For every 100 females, there were 87.8 males. For every 100 females age 18 and over, there were 80.1 males.

The median income for a household in the town was $30,714, and the median income for a family was $40,156. Males had a median income of $27,159 versus $20,521 for females. The per capita income for the town was $17,189. About 12.6% of families and 13.7% of the population were below the poverty line, including 17.6% of those under age 18 and 21.0% of those age 65 or over.

== Education ==
Sardis residents are zoned to schools in the Henderson County School System.

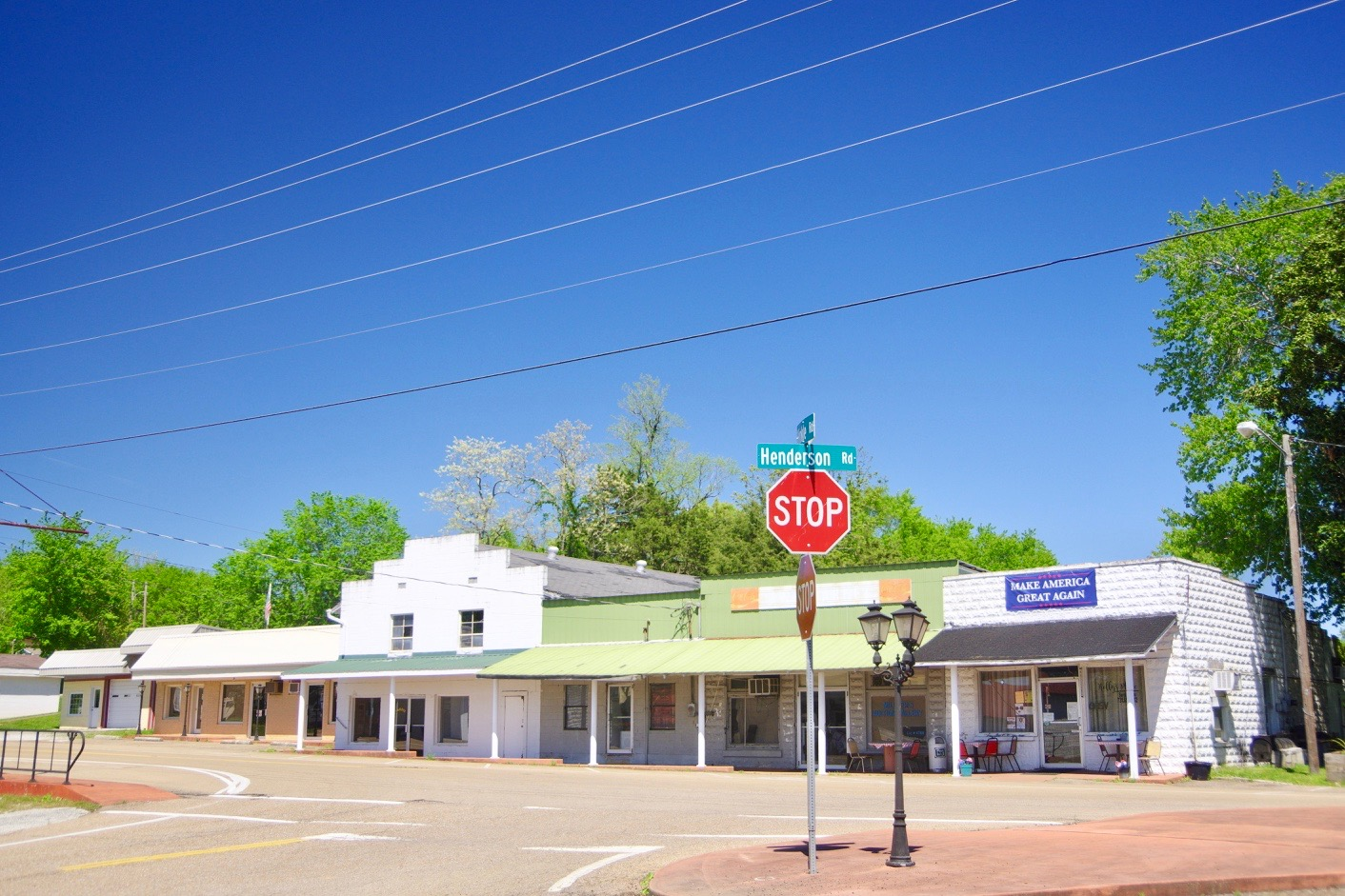
Businesses near the junctions of SR 104, SR 201, and SR 421, April 2019

== Transportation ==
Both Tennessee State Route 104 (SR 104) and Tennessee State Route 201 (SR 201) pass through town (running concurrent for about 0.4 miles [0.64 km]), while Tennessee State Route 421 (SR 421) has its northern terminus at SR 104, just south of the southern junction of SR 104 and SR 201. Within the town the northwestern portion of SR 201 is known as Henderson Road and the northeastern portion as Sardis-Scotts Hill Road. SR 421 is known Hinkle Road.

== See also ==
- List of towns in Tennessee
