= Red Sulphur Springs, Tennessee =

- Unincorporated community
- Location within Tennessee Location within the United States
- Coordinates: 35°00′25″N 88°14′15″W
- Country: United States
- State: Tennessee
- County: Hardin
- Elevation: 459 ft (140 m)
- Time zone: UTC-6 (Central (CST))
  - Summer (DST): UTC-5 (CDT)
- Area code: 731
- GNIS feature ID: 1315795

Red Sulphur Springs is an unincorporated community in Hardin County, Tennessee. Red Sulphur Springs is located on Tennessee State Route 57 near the Tennessee River and just north of the Mississippi border.

The community takes its name from a nearby mineral spring of the same name.
