= Crossroads, Tennessee =

- Unincorporated community
- Location within Tennessee Location within the United States
- Coordinates: 35°17′59″N 88°07′25″W
- Country: United States
- State: Tennessee
- County: Hardin
- Elevation: 551 ft (168 m)
- Time zone: UTC-6 (Central (CST))
  - Summer (DST): UTC-5 (CDT)
- Area code: 731
- GNIS feature ID: 1314913

Crossroads is an unincorporated community in Hardin County, Tennessee. Crossroads is located on Tennessee State Route 128, northeast of Savannah.

== In fiction ==
Crossroads is featured extensively in the web comic Johnny Bullet. In the strip, it is spelled Cross Roads and is a larger size city, comparable to neighbouring Savannah, Tennessee, in Hardin County.
