= Hardinville, Tennessee =

Coordinates: 35.2234138°N 88.1461448°W

Hardinville (also spelled Hardinsville) was a town founded in 1817 "near the confluence of Turkey and Boone's Creeks", east of the Tennessee River, in Hardin County, Tennessee. It was incorporated by the state legislature on October 24, 1824. On March 3, 1825, the Congress of the United States passed a law establishing a number of post roads, including one "From Hardinsville[sic], by M'Nairy Courthouse, and Hardiman Courthouse, to Tipton Courthouse." and another "From Hardinville, to Florence, Alabama."

Hardinville served as the first county seat of Hardin County; but at the urgings of the settlers west of the Tennessee, the seat was moved to Rudd's Ferry (later Savannah) in 1829. By the time of the Civil War, the former Hardinville had been renamed Old Town.

The approximate location of the settlement is near what is now Old Town Loop roughly ten kilometers east of Savannah.
