= Hookers Bend, Tennessee =

- Unincorporated community
- Location within Tennessee Location within the United States
- Coordinates: 35°19′14″N 88°12′55″W
- Country: United States
- State: Tennessee
- County: Hardin
- Elevation: 404 ft (123 m)
- Time zone: UTC-6 (Central (CST))
  - Summer (DST): UTC-5 (CDT)
- Area code: 731
- GNIS feature ID: 1288238

Hookers Bend is an unincorporated community in Hardin County, Tennessee. Hookers Bend is located north of Savannah near a bend in the Tennessee River. The community is named after founder John Hooker.
