= Hardin County, Tennessee =

County in Tennessee, United States

- County
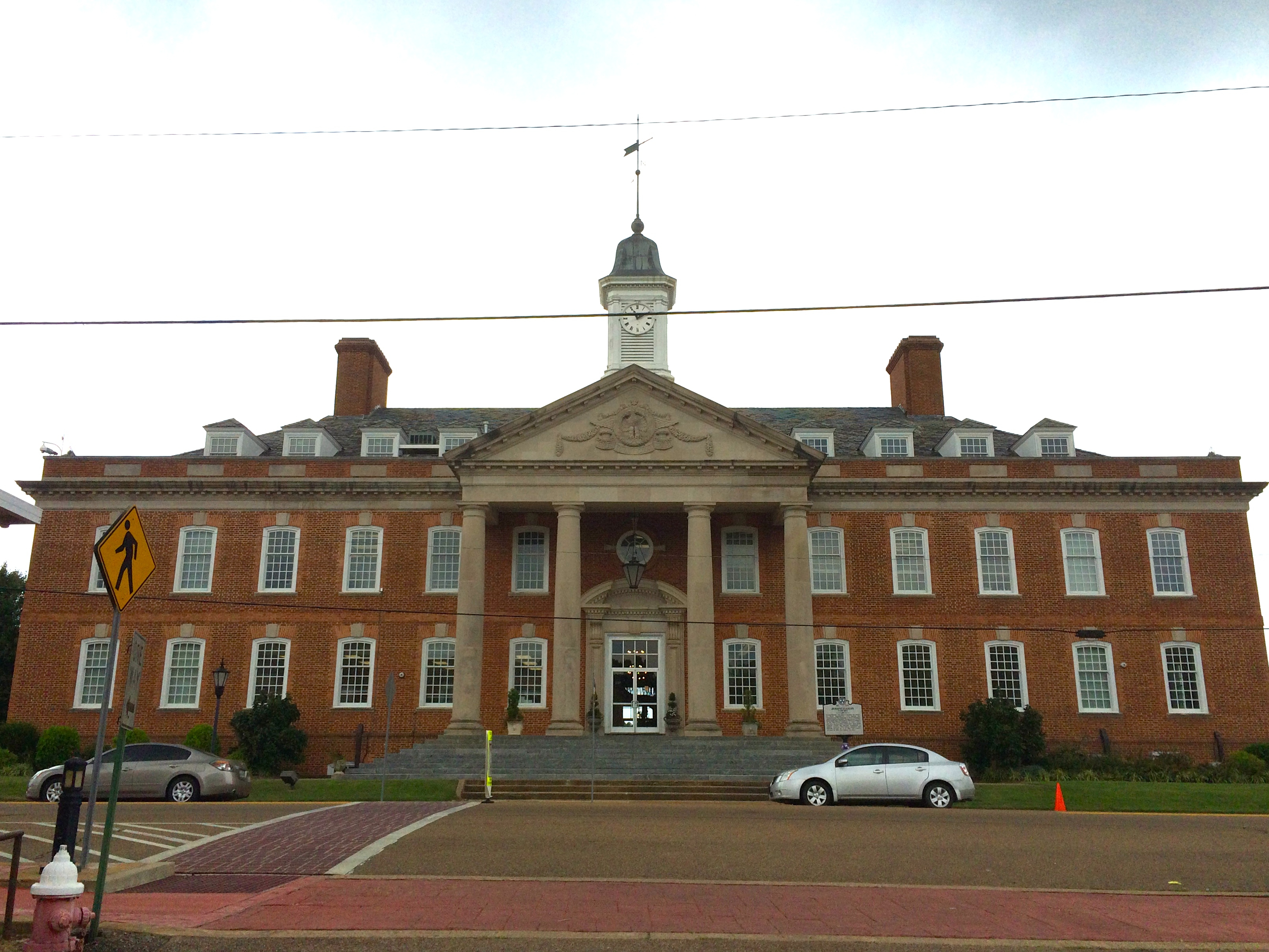
- Hardin County Courthouse in Savannah

- Seal

- Location within the U.S. state of Tennessee
- Coordinates: 35°12′N 88°11′W
- Country: United States
- State: Tennessee
- Founded: 1819
- Named for: Joseph Hardin, Sr.
- Seat: Savannah
- Largest city: Savannah

Government
  - Mayor: Kevin Davis

Area
  - Total: 596 sq mi (1,540 km^{2})
  - Land: 577 sq mi (1,490 km^{2})
  - Water: 19 sq mi (49 km^{2}) 3.2%

Population (2020)
  - Total: 26,831
  - Estimate (2025): 27,983 ▲
  - Density: 46.5/sq mi (18.0/km^{2})
- Time zone: UTC−6 (Central)
  - Summer (DST): UTC−5 (CDT)
- Congressional district: 8th
- Website: https://www.hardincogov.com/

Hardin County is a county located in the U.S. state of Tennessee. As of the 2020 census, the population was 26,831. The county seat is Savannah. Hardin County is located north of and along the borders of Mississippi and Alabama. The county was founded in November 1819 and named posthumously for Col. Joseph Hardin, a Revolutionary War soldier and a legislative representative for the Province of North Carolina; the State of Franklin; and the Southwest Territory. Hardin County was the site of the Battle of Shiloh (also known as the Battle of Pittsburg Landing) during the Civil War.

== History ==
The dedication plaque for the Savannah, TN courthouse which is dedicated to Col. Joseph Hardin.

=== The Hardin Expedition ===
Two parties of settlers (totaling 26) struck out from Knoxville, Tennessee in late spring of 1816 bound for the general area which would eventually become Savannah, Tennessee. The first party, traveling by boat, came by way of the Tennessee River, landing in May at "the easteward curve of the Tennessee" [sic] at Cerro Gordo.

The second, and larger, party had traversed overland and encountered several delays. Upon the arrival of the second group, the parties finally rejoined at Johnson Creek, near present day Savannah. (Note: Three early surveys were made of vast tracts of land lying on the east bank of the Tennessee River, in and near the present site of Savannah, in what is now Hardin County. One of these was in behalf of Colonel Joseph Hardin (Sr) for 3,000 acres) It was now July, and the pioneers set about the laying down of the first permanent settlement by non-Native Americans in the area.

This second party was led by Joseph Hardin, Jr., son of Col. Joseph Hardin who had, before his death, accumulated several land grants to the area as rewards for his Revolutionary War service. Joseph, Jr. was accompanied on the trip by his brother, James Hardin. James was the founder of what would become the first county seat, Hardinville. The settlement was created in 1817 on nearby Hardin's Creek—on the site of what was later renamed Old Town, Tennessee. Both men executed land grants in the area. They had fought alongside their father in the war and had been likewise rewarded with their own land patents, as well as inheriting some of their father's unclaimed grants.

Other settlers in the expedition continued further downriver, establishing another community at Saltillo, in 1817.

=== County creation ===
For eleven days after its initial establishment (in November 1819), the boundaries of Hardin County reached Wayne County west to the Mississippi River. The establishment of then neighboring Shelby County and others continued to diminish the size of Hardin until it reached its present boundaries. The county was named for Revolutionary War veteran, Joseph Hardin, a former colonial assemblyman for the Province of North Carolina, Speaker of the House for the unrecognized State of Franklin and a territorial legislator of the Southwest Territory.

=== Civil War and Battle of Shiloh ===
Like several other counties along the Tennessee River, Hardin County was largely pro-Union during the Civil War, contrary to the generally pro-Confederate sympathies of West and Middle Tennessee. In Tennessee's Ordinance of Secession referendum on June 8, 1861, Hardin County voted to remain in the Union by a margin of 1,051 to 498, being one of only eight counties in West or Middle Tennessee to support the Union. Earlier on February 9, 1861, Hardin County voters had voted against holding a secession convention by a margin of 791 to 395.

Hardin County was the site of the 1862 Battle of Shiloh (also known as the Battle of Pittsburg Landing) during the Civil War. The battleground is several miles south of Savannah, and extends into Tishomingo County, Mississippi.

== Geography ==
According to the U.S. Census Bureau, the county has a total area of 596 square miles (1,540 km^{2}), of which 577 square miles (1,490 km^{2}) is land and 19 square miles (49 km^{2}) (3.2%) is water.

Hardin County is located in western southern Tennessee (although part of the county is east of the Tennessee River, the county is considered part of the "Grand Division" of West Tennessee). The county is divided into two nearly equal divisions by the Tennessee River, which enters about midway on the south side and passes out near the northeast corner, flowing northwards. The length of the county from north to south is about 30 miles, and its greatest width, from east to west, about 21.

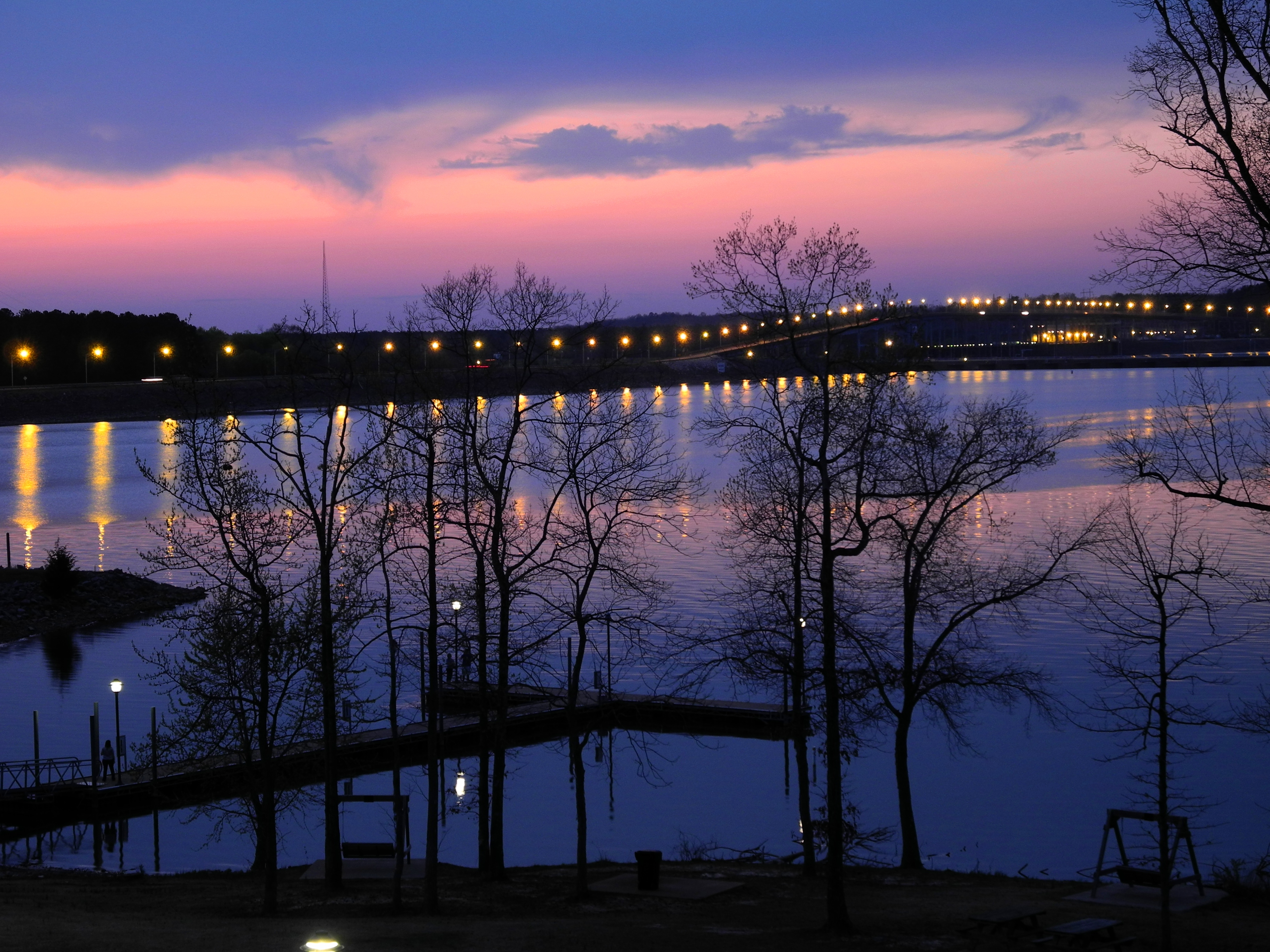
Pickwick Dam and Lake

=== Adjacent counties ===
- Decatur County (north)
- Wayne County (east)
- Lauderdale County, Alabama (southeast)
- Tishomingo County, Mississippi (south)
- Alcorn County, Mississippi (southwest)
- McNairy County (west)
- Chester County (northwest)
- Henderson County (north)

=== National protected area ===
- Shiloh National Military Park

=== State protected areas ===
- Dry Creek Wildlife Management Area
- Pickwick Landing State Park
- Walker Branch State Natural Area
- White Oak Wildlife Management Area

== Demographics ==
Historical population
| Census | Pop. | Note | %± |
|---|---|---|---|
| 1820 | 1,462 | | — |
| 1830 | 4,868 | | 233.0% |
| 1840 | 8,245 | | 69.4% |
| 1850 | 10,328 | | 25.3% |
| 1860 | 11,214 | | 8.6% |
| 1870 | 11,768 | | 4.9% |
| 1880 | 14,793 | | 25.7% |
| 1890 | 17,698 | | 19.6% |
| 1900 | 19,246 | | 8.7% |
| 1910 | 17,521 | | −9.0% |
| 1920 | 17,291 | | −1.3% |
| 1930 | 16,213 | | −6.2% |
| 1940 | 17,806 | | 9.8% |
| 1950 | 16,908 | | −5.0% |
| 1960 | 17,397 | | 2.9% |
| 1970 | 18,212 | | 4.7% |
| 1980 | 22,280 | | 22.3% |
| 1990 | 22,633 | | 1.6% |
| 2000 | 25,578 | | 13.0% |
| 2010 | 26,026 | | 1.8% |
| 2020 | 26,831 | | 3.1% |
| 2025 (est.) | 27,983 | ▲ | 4.3% |
U.S. Decennial Census; 1790-1960 1900-1990; 1990-2000 2010-2014

=== 2020 census ===
Hardin County racial composition
| Race | Num. | Perc. |
|---|---|---|
| White (non-Hispanic) | 24,272 | 90.46% |
| Black or African American (non-Hispanic) | 805 | 3.0% |
| Native American | 81 | 0.3% |
| Asian | 148 | 0.55% |
| Other/Mixed | 960 | 3.58% |
| Hispanic or Latino | 565 | 2.11% |

As of the 2020 census, there were 26,831 people, 10,137 households, and 7,203 families residing in the county.

The census recorded a median age of 46.5 years, with 20.4% of residents under the age of 18 and 23.3% aged 65 or older. For every 100 females there were 95.5 males, and for every 100 females age 18 and over there were 93.9 males.

The racial makeup of the county was 91.2% White, 3.0% Black or African American, 0.4% American Indian and Alaska Native, 0.6% Asian, <0.1% Native Hawaiian and Pacific Islander, 0.9% from some other race, and 4.0% from two or more races. Hispanic or Latino residents of any race comprised 2.1% of the population.

32.9% of residents lived in urban areas, while 67.1% lived in rural areas.

Of the 10,137 households, 26.4% had children under the age of 18 living in them, 47.6% were married-couple households, 19.4% had a male householder with no spouse or partner present, and 27.0% had a female householder with no spouse or partner present. About 30.4% of all households were made up of individuals and 14.9% had someone living alone who was 65 years of age or older.

There were 15,063 housing units, of which 25.4% were vacant. Among the 11,244 occupied housing units, 74.3% were owner-occupied and 25.7% were renter-occupied. The homeowner vacancy rate was 2.7% and the rental vacancy rate was 8.8%.

=== 2000 census ===
At the 2000 census there were 25,578 people, 10,426 households, and 7,444 families in the county. The population density was 44 people per square mile (17 people/km^{2}). There were 12,807 housing units at an average density of 22 units per square mile (8.5 units/km^{2}). The racial makeup of the county was 94.91% White, 3.69% Black or African American, 0.20% Native American, 0.16% Asian, 0.02% Pacific Islander, 0.30% from other races, and 0.72% from two or more races. 1.02%. were Hispanic or Latino of any race. 45.1% were of American, 9.8% Irish, 9.7% English and 9.5% German ancestry according to Census 2000.

Of the 10,426 households 29.70% had children under the age of 18 living with them, 57.30% were married couples living together, 10.10% had a female householder with no husband present, and 28.60% were non-families. 25.50% of households were one person and 11.80% were one person aged 65 or older. The average household size was 2.41 and the average family size was 2.87.

The age distribution was 23.10% under the age of 18, 7.90% from 18 to 24, 26.60% from 25 to 44, 26.40% from 45 to 64, and 16.10% 65 or older. The median age was 40 years. For every 100 females there were 96.70 males. For every 100 females age 18 and over, there were 92.20 males.

The median household income was $27,819 and the median family income was $34,157. Males had a median income of $28,357 versus $18,806 for females. The per capita income for the county was $15,598. About 14.60% of families and 18.80% of the population were below the poverty line, including 25.80% of those under age 18 and 17.80% of those age 65 or over.

== Politics ==
United States presidential election results for Hardin County, Tennessee
| Year | Republican | | Democratic | | Third party(ies) | |
| Year | No. | % | No. | % | No. | % |
|---|---|---|---|---|---|---|
| 1912 | 955 | 41.22% | 738 | 31.85% | 624 | 26.93% |
| 1916 | 1,811 | 64.68% | 979 | 34.96% | 10 | 0.36% |
| 1920 | 3,077 | 68.58% | 1,398 | 31.16% | 12 | 0.27% |
| 1924 | 1,175 | 65.39% | 618 | 34.39% | 4 | 0.22% |
| 1928 | 1,580 | 68.91% | 707 | 30.83% | 6 | 0.26% |
| 1932 | 1,036 | 55.97% | 806 | 43.54% | 9 | 0.49% |
| 1936 | 1,348 | 46.56% | 1,538 | 53.13% | 9 | 0.31% |
| 1940 | 2,264 | 53.31% | 1,957 | 46.08% | 26 | 0.61% |
| 1944 | 2,124 | 60.69% | 1,358 | 38.80% | 18 | 0.51% |
| 1948 | 1,779 | 54.29% | 1,270 | 38.75% | 228 | 6.96% |
| 1952 | 2,459 | 59.28% | 1,677 | 40.43% | 12 | 0.29% |
| 1956 | 2,898 | 61.92% | 1,734 | 37.05% | 48 | 1.03% |
| 1960 | 3,323 | 65.18% | 1,690 | 33.15% | 85 | 1.67% |
| 1964 | 3,025 | 53.59% | 2,620 | 46.41% | 0 | 0.00% |
| 1968 | 2,910 | 45.55% | 1,153 | 18.05% | 2,325 | 36.40% |
| 1972 | 4,401 | 76.29% | 1,202 | 20.84% | 166 | 2.88% |
| 1976 | 3,362 | 49.07% | 3,438 | 50.18% | 52 | 0.76% |
| 1980 | 4,152 | 55.84% | 3,164 | 42.56% | 119 | 1.60% |
| 1984 | 4,632 | 59.59% | 3,051 | 39.25% | 90 | 1.16% |
| 1988 | 4,252 | 59.98% | 2,808 | 39.61% | 29 | 0.41% |
| 1992 | 3,875 | 45.10% | 3,922 | 45.65% | 795 | 9.25% |
| 1996 | 3,980 | 49.03% | 3,508 | 43.22% | 629 | 7.75% |
| 2000 | 4,951 | 56.38% | 3,735 | 42.53% | 96 | 1.09% |
| 2004 | 6,087 | 61.15% | 3,834 | 38.52% | 33 | 0.33% |
| 2008 | 7,077 | 70.52% | 2,794 | 27.84% | 164 | 1.63% |
| 2012 | 7,886 | 75.14% | 2,467 | 23.51% | 142 | 1.35% |
| 2016 | 8,012 | 80.53% | 1,622 | 16.30% | 315 | 3.17% |
| 2020 | 9,559 | 82.85% | 1,775 | 15.38% | 204 | 1.77% |
| 2024 | 10,293 | 85.11% | 1,704 | 14.09% | 97 | 0.80% |

Hardin County is overwhelmingly Republican, and, even before the rapid trend of the upland South away from the Democratic Party, was a Unionist Republican enclave in historically Democratic West Tennessee. This is due to the shallow, humus-poor and easily erodible Highland Rim soils, which were much less suitable for plantation farming than the rest of Middle and West Tennessee. Since the Civil War, only three Democratic Presidential candidates have ever carried Hardin County – Franklin D. Roosevelt in 1936, Jimmy Carter in 1976, and Bill Clinton in 1992 – with only FDR achieving a margin of more than 100 votes.

== Education ==
Hardin County has one community and several city elementary schools, and also has a middle school. The county has one high school, Hardin County High School, whose sports teams are nicknamed "The Tigers". The Savannah-Hardin County Center, a branch campus of Jackson State Community College, has operated in the City of Savannah, offering an Associate of Science degree in General Studies, since 1998. The University of Memphis has occasionally offered classes at the Center in the past, but there were no classes scheduled there in the summer or fall of 2009. There is also the Tennessee Technology Center at Crump.

=== Hardin County Schools ===
- Hardin County High School
- Hardin County Middle School
- East Hardin Elementary School
- West Hardin Elementary School
- Northside Elementary School
- Pickwick Southside Elementary School
- Parris South Elementary School

=== Private Schools ===
- Savannah Christian Academy

== Emergency services ==
Hardin County maintains its own Level 4 Trauma Center out of Hardin Medical Center in Savannah. Emergency medical services to Savannah and the surrounding county are provided by a paid 24/7 ambulance service based out of this hospital. Fire protection to the city of Savannah is provided by a 24-hour paid Fire Department based out of two stations, with five pieces of apparatus. The County of Hardin is protected by a combination of paid and volunteer Firefighter/First-Responder and Firefighter/EMT-IV level engine companies, based out of 15 Fire Districts and with approximately 60 pieces of apparatus. The county also maintains a disaster/mass casualty team and a HAZMAT Team.

== Media ==
=== Radio ===
- FM 88.1 WAZD
- FM 93.5 WKWX
- FM 101.7 WORM-FM
- FM 103.5 WDXI
- FM 106.1 WQTR

=== Newspaper ===
- The Courier (Savannah, Tennessee)

== Infrastructure ==
=== Savannah-Hardin County Airport ===
Savannah-Hardin County Airport (ICAO: KSNH, FAA LID: SNH) is a public-use airport located near Savannah, Tennessee, in Hardin County. The airport is owned by the City of Savannah and Hardin County. It has one runway, designated 1/19, with a concrete surface measuring 5,002 by 100 feet.

=== Major highways ===
Hardin County is served by several highways, including U.S. Route 64, which passes through the county and connects the communities of Adamsville and Savannah. State routes such as Tennessee State Route 69, Tennessee State Route 128, and Tennessee State Route 57 also provide regional access within the county.

== Communities ==
=== Cities ===
- Adamsville (mostly in McNairy County)
- Crump
- Savannah (county seat)

=== Towns ===
- Milledgeville (partial)
- Saltillo

=== Census-designated places ===
- Childers Hill
- Counce
- Morris Chapel
- Nixon
- Olivet
- Shiloh
- Walnut Grove

=== Other unincorporated communities ===
- Big Ivy
- Bucktown
- Caney Hollow
- Cerro Gordo
- Crossroads
- Grandview
- Hamburg
- Hinkle
- Hookers Bend
- Hurley
- Lebanon
- Maddox
- Oak Grove
- Olivehill
- Pickwick Dam
- Pittsburg Landing
- Pyburn
- Red Sulphur Springs
- Shady Grove
- Southside
- Swift
- Thompson Crossroads
- Walkertown
- Winn Springs

=== Ghost Town ===
- Hardinville

== See also ==
- National Register of Historic Places listings in Hardin County, Tennessee
