= Tokyo Blade =

English heavy metal band

- Origin: Salisbury, Wiltshire, England
- Genres: Heavy metal, glam metal, NWOBHM
- Years active: 1982–1991, 1994–1998, 2007–present
- Labels: Powerstation, Combat, Razar Ice Records
- Members: Andy Boulton; John Wiggins; Andy Wrighton; Steve Pierce; Alan Marsh
- Past members: Vicki James Wright; Bryan Holland; Nicolaj Ruhnow; Michael Pozz; Pete Zito; Brian George; Chris Gillen; Danny Gwilym; Sean Cooper; Gary Jeffrey; Ray Dismore; Frank 'Saparddi' Kruckle; Andy Robbins; Dave Sale; Colin Riggs; Alex Lee; Marc Angel; Lorenzo Gonzalez; Martin Machwitz; Ian 'Attila' Marshall
- Website: Official Homepage

Tokyo Blade are an English heavy metal band, active since 1982. Tokyo Blade is one of the many acts considered part of the new wave of British heavy metal (NWOBHM) movement, which lasted from the late 1970s to the early 1980s. Tokyo Blade have been through many changes of formation and have disbanded twice, often changing their musical style during their years of activity. However, the band is still active (as of 2020), with most of the original members in the lineup.

== History ==
=== NWOBHM (1979-1985) ===
The band was formed in Salisbury in the late 1970s, under the moniker White Diamond, which was a cover band, (changed to Killer in 1981 and then changed again, to Genghis Khan). The original lineup consisted of Alan Marsh (vocals), Andy Boulton (guitar), Ray Dismore (guitar), Andy Robbins (bass), and Steve Pierce (drums). After a final change of name to Tokyo Blade, the band signed with the British independent record label Powerstation Records and recorded their first album. This album was self-titled in all regions, except in the United States and Canada, where it came out under the title Midnight Rendezvous on the Combat Records label, in 1984. In fact, this was a compilation of four earlier recordings, dating from when the band were called Genghis Khan, plus four songs from the original Tokyo Blade album. Also in 1984, the band shared the stages of clubs and festivals with notable acts such as Metallica and Venom.

Like many other acts from that era, Tokyo Blade was plagued by frequent changes of band members. By the time their second album was released, vocalist Alan Marsh had been replaced by Vick Wright. The album, Night of the Blade was issued in 1984 with Wright on vocals. However, in 1998, an edition of the album featuring Marsh's original vocals was eventually released, as Night of the Blade... The Night Before. In that period, Tokyo Blade took part in tours and festival packages with the likes of Blue Öyster Cult, Dio, Ozzy Osbourne and Scorpions.

The band's third record, Black Hearts & Jaded Spades was released in 1985 on the band's own label in Europe; it was available in the United States as an import. The band filmed a concert at London's Camden Palace, which was shown on TV in the UK on Channel 4 in 1985, and has since made its way onto multiple bootleg DVD releases. By the end of the year, Tokyo Blade had disbanded, with all members subsequently dedicating their time and efforts to other projects.

=== Andy Boulton's Tokyo Blade (1985-1989) ===
Original vocalist Alan Marsh formed another Far East-influenced band called Shogun, alongside former Chinatown guitarist Danny Gwilym. They released two albums, and worked with noted producer Bob Ezrin. Shogun eventually worked with Tokyo Blade bandmates Steve Pierce, Andy Wrighton and Andy Robbins.

Guitarist John Wiggins (Deep Machine, Slam) would go on to play in the first edition of Battlezone with ex-Iron Maiden vocalist Paul Di'Anno.

Original bassist Andy Robbins would be a part of the bands Jagged Edge and Taste, who recorded a single with Iron Maiden's Bruce Dickinson and later became the hard rock band Skin.

Vocalist Vick Wright formed the band Johnny Crash; this being the first project related to Tokyo Blade to appear on a major label in the United States, with the release of the album Neighbourhood Threat. A revamped line-up of Johnny Crash, including future Guns N' Roses members Dizzy Reed and Matt Sorum, recorded a second album, originally called Damnation Alley, which saw release in 2008 on Suncity Records. This album was later re-released under the title Unfinished Business.

Original guitarist Andy Boulton continued recording under the name "Andy Boulton's Tokyo Blade", with an entirely new lineup in place. This new incarnation of Tokyo Blade released the album Ain't Misbehavin' in 1987 and toured on the festival circuit, playing on the same stages as bands such as Black Sabbath. Vocalist Pete Zito then went on to front a band called Inside Out.

In 1988, Andy Boulton recruited members of the German band The Dead Ballerinas (featuring former Kin Ping Meh vocalist Michael Pozz) to record the album No Remorse, which was issued on the GAMA International sub-label Hot Blood Records. Like the debut, this album has since been reissued with multiple covers. Following the album's release, Tokyo Blade disbanded once again, with Boulton returning to work with Alan Marsh.

=== Mr. Ice and reformation (1989-1998) ===
Following record company problems which caused Shogun to disband, Alan Marsh formed a group called Mr. Ice, which eventually included guitarist Andy Boulton. As this group now featured two key members from Tokyo Blade, a move from the band's management to resurrect the old name for a European tour with Uriah Heep led to additional issues. Boulton exited the group and was replaced by guitarist Steve Kerr. At the conclusion of the tour, both Kerr and the management team exited. Some of the tracks from the Mr. Ice project were released as a Tokyo Blade record in the mid-1990s.

By 1994, Marsh and Boulton were playing together again and creating new music. They released the album Burning Down Paradise on SPV in 1996. Certain tracks were also released as a Tokyo Blade record in the mid-to-late 1990s.

The band's early albums were reissued in 1997 on the High Vaultage label, and the latter-period recordings were gathered together by Zoom Club. A live album, entitled Live in Germany was released in 2009.

=== Solo projects and new activities (2008–present) ===
Andy Boulton went on to be in the band XFX, later concentrating his efforts on a solo album and on teaching electric and bass guitar.

For a while, Alan Marsh joined the cast of a musical based on the story of Jack the Ripper.

Second vocalist Vick Wright wrote a number of screenplays and a novel called "South of the Pole", worked on the production of a comedy show, and pursued a publishing deal.

Bassist Andy Wrighton (Deep Machine, Shogun) and guitarist John Wiggins (Deep Machine, Slam) joined the reformed Deep Machine in 2009, with guitarist Bob Hooker, singer Lenny Baxter (ex-Gangland) and drummer Chas Towler (Slam). Deep Machine split up in October 2015.

After more than twelve years of inactivity, a new version of Tokyo Blade was rebuilt by guitarist Bryan Holland, including Andy Boulton alongside new members: singer Chris Gillen, drummer Lorenzo Gonzalez, and bassist Frank Sapardi. This lineup of the band successfully toured throughout Europe during 2007-2010.

Andy Boulton quit the band just prior to the band's Autumn 2009 European tour, citing health reasons; he gave Bryan Holland his blessing to continue without him. The remaining members of the band therefore carried on, to fulfill their touring contracts and commitments.

Following the conclusion of the 2009 tour and the release of the Live in Germany album, the band's previous lineup dissolved in 2010. Andy Boulton subsequently re-enlisted four members of the band's classic lineup: John Wiggins, Andy Wrighton and Steve Pierce, with vocalist Chris Gillen remaining on board. However, Gillen did not perform or record with the band again and was soon replaced by Domain singer Nicolaj Ruhnow.

The band recorded their next album Thousand Men Strong with producer Chris Tsangarides, and it was released in March 2011. Tokyo Blade was a live attraction at metal festivals in 2010, 2011, 2012 and 2013.

In early 2012, former member Ray Dismore formed a band called Innovator, alongside vocalist Mike Vickers. They have since released several albums of original material.

Nicolaj Ruhnow left Tokyo Blade abruptly in 2014, citing a fallout with Andy Boulton, and Chris Gillen then returned to the band as lead vocalist.

A reformation of Tokyo Blade's classic lineup occurred in 2016, when vocalist Alan Marsh rejoined Andy Boulton, John Wiggins, Andy Wrighton and Steve Pierce in the band. This lineup recorded the albums Unbroken (released in 2018), Dark Revolution (released in 2020) and Fury (released in 2022). Their next album, Time Is the Fire, was released on 17 January 2025.

== Members ==
=== Current members ===
- Alan Marsh - lead vocals (1982–1984, 1990–1991, 1995–1996, 2016–present)
- Andy Boulton - guitar (1982–1991, 1995–1996, 2007–present)
- John Wiggins - guitar (1983-1986; 1995-1996, 2010–present)
- Andy Wrighton - bass (1984–1986, 2010–present)
- Steve Pierce - drums (1982–1986, 2010–present)

=== Former members ===
- Vick Wright - lead vocals (1984–1986)
- Pete Zito - lead vocals (1987–1988)
- Michael Pozz - lead vocals (1989)
- Nicolaj Ruhnow - lead vocals (2010–2014)
- Chris Gillen - lead vocals (2007–2009, 2015–2016)
- Danny Gwilym - guitar (1990–1991)
- Ray Dismore - guitar (1982–1983)
- Bryan Holland - guitar (2007–2009)
- Andy Robbins - bass (1982–1984)
- Chris Stover - bass (1987–1988)
- Dave Sale - bass (1989)
- Colin Riggs - bass (1990–1991, 1995–1996)
- Frank 'Saparddi' Kruckel - bass (2007–2009)
- Alex Lee - drums (1987–1988)
- Hans Juergen Astor - drums (1989)
- Marc Angel - drums (1990–1991, 1995–1996)
- Lorenzo Gonzalez - drums (2007–2009)
- Martin Machwitz - keyboards (1989)
- Ian 'Attila' Marshall - keyboards (1990–1991)

== Discography ==
=== Studio albums ===
- Tokyo Blade (1983)
- Night of the Blade (1984)
- Black Hearts & Jaded Spades (1985)
- Ain't Misbehavin' (1987)
- No Remorse (1989)
- Burning Down Paradise (1995)
- Pumphouse (1998)
- Eye of the Storm (2008, re-release of No Remorse)
- Thousand Men Strong (2011)
- Unbroken (2018)
- Dark Revolution (2020)
- Fury (2022)
- Time Is the Fire (2025)
- Hoist the Colours High (2026)

=== EPs ===
- Lightning Strikes (1984)
- Midnight Rendezvous (1984)
- Madame Guillotine (1985)
- Mr. Ice (1998)
- Camp 334 (2012)
- Stick it ... (2012)

=== Live albums ===
- Live in Germany (2009) CD
- Live in Germany (2010) DVD

=== Music Videos ===
- Black Water (2018)

== Related releases ==
- Shogun - Shogun (Alan Marsh)
- Shogun - 31 Days (Alan Marsh / Andy Wrighton / Steve Pierce)
- Johnny Crash - Neighbourhood Threat & Unfinished Business (Vick Wright)
- Battlezone - Fighting Back (John Wiggins)
- Battlezone - Children of Madness (John Wiggins)
- Battlezone - Feel My Pain (John Wiggins / Colin Riggs / Marc Angel)
- 12 Apostel - 12 Apostel (Martin Machwitz)
- Dead Ballerinas - Dead Ballerinas (Michael Pozz)
- Kin Ping Meh - Kin Ping Meh (Michael Pozz)
- Skin - Multiple albums (Andy Robbins)
- Innovator - Multiple albums (Ray Dismore)
- Reverence - When Darkness Calls (2012) (Bryan Holland)
- Reverence - Gods of War (2015) (Bryan Holland / Lorenzo Gonzalez)
- Reverence - Live (2016) (Bryan Holland / Lorenzo Gonzalez)
- Nick Hellfort - The Mask Within (2013) (Nicolaj Ruhnow)
- Irony - 2K5 (2005) (Nicolaj Ruhnow)
- Irony - In the Beginning .. Echoes from the Past (2007) (Nicolaj Ruhnow)
- Irony - Black For More (2019) (Nicolaj Ruhnow)
- Domain - The Chronicles Of Love, Hate And Sorrow (2009) (Nicolaj Ruhnow)
- Mojo Blizzard - Lost In Space II (2020) (Nicolaj Ruhnow)

== See also ==
- List of new wave of British heavy metal bands
