= Chester County School District =

School district in Tennessee, United States

Address
- 970 East Main Street Henderson, Tennessee, 38340; United States

District information
- Type: Public
- Grades: PreK–12
- NCES District ID: 4700600

Students and staff
- Students: 2,676
- Teachers: 182.5 (FTE)
- Staff: 225.5 (FTE)
- Student–teacher ratio: 14.66

Other information
- Website: chestercountyschools.org

The Chester County School District is a school district that operates public schools in Chester County, Tennessee, United States. It has six schools that provide and education from kindergarten to 12th grade. As of 2005, there were 2438 children of school age enrolled. The district's administrative offices are in Henderson, Tennessee.

== Schools ==
- Chester County High School - enrollment: 662
- Chester County Junior High - enrollment: 373
- Chester County Middle School - enrollment: 619
- East Chester Elementary School - enrollment: 391
- Jacks Creek Elementary School - enrollment: 285
- West Chester Elementary School - enrollment: 108

== History ==
On the organization of Chester County in 1882, there were 32 school districts with about 60 school houses. Most of these small school buildings were of frame or log construction and only two were made of brick. In 1885 the scholastic population in the public schools was 3,135. By contrast, the scholastic population of Chester County now is about 2,400.

Henderson had two school in the role of public schools and were run as consolidated schools. They were the Henderson Male and Female College on North Street and the Henderson Male and Female Masonic Institute.

There was also a consolidated school at Montezuma, the old Jackson District High School, the Howard Seminary located at the junction of the Lexington-Purdy Road with the Enville-Henderson Road and the Pine Springs Normal School which was on the road to Roby not far from the current location of Bailey's Store.

The average length of the school term was about fifty days during the summer months since the school houses were not suitable for use in cold weather. Consequently, attendance was not very good, work was not too effective, and many people sold their farms to move to areas with better schools.

Until the advent of the school bus program in the early 1930s a student desiring to get a high school education had to provide his own transportation to Henderson or board in town, as the only high school was in Henderson.

There were public schools for black children in Chester County in the nineteenth century. These schools were held in church buildings. There were schools in Chester County in churches as late as 1938. The first school building in the county for black children was built as early as 1906 in the northern part of Chester County on land given by Tom Cawthon. This school was named Cawthon School, soon followed by Oak Grove School. Schools in Masseyville and Montezuma were also built but both were destroyed by fire.

The first black high school, Chester County Training School, was opened in 1932 and was located on Highway 45 North. In 1936, the first graduating class of seven pupils received their diplomas. This school was burned in 1949 but a new building was erected on the east side of town. In 1963, Chester County Training School's name was changed to Vincent High. In 1969, following integration, the school was closed; however, the building is now being used as North Chester Elementary.
