= Tennessee State Route 225 =

State highway in Tennessee, United States

State Route 225
- SR 225 highlighted in red

Route information
- Maintained by TDOT
- Length: 17.1 mi (27.5 km)
- Existed: July 1, 1983–present

Major junctions
- South end: US 64 near Hornsby
- North end: SR 100 near Henderson

Location
- Country: United States
- State: Tennessee
- Counties: McNairy, Chester

Highway system
- Tennessee State Routes; Interstate; US; State
← SR 224	→ SR 226

State Route 225 (SR 225) is a 17.1-mile-long (27.5 km) north–south secondary state highway located in West Tennessee. It connects Hornsby with Henderson.

== Route description ==
SR 225 just east of Hornsby at an intersection with US 64 (SR 15) in McNairy County. It winds its way north to enter Chester County and pass through wooded and hilly terrain, along with the communities of Woodville, Masseyville, Hickory Corners, and Montezuma. The highway then comes to an end near Henderson at an intersection with SR 100. The entire route of SR 225 is a rural two-lane highway.

== Major intersections ==
County	Location	mi	km	Destinations	Notes
McNairy		0.0	0.0	US 64 (SR 15) – Bolivar, Hornsby, Selmer	Southern terminus
Chester		17.1	27.5	SR 100 – Whiteville, Toone, Henderson	Northern terminus
1.000 mi = 1.609 km; 1.000 km = 0.621 mi
