= Pay the Man =

Pay the Man may refer to:

- "Pay the Man", song by David Lindley from the album El Rayo-X , 1981
- "Pay the Man", song by the Offspring from the album Americana, 1998
- "Pay the Man", song by Tokyo Blade from the album Pumphouse, 1998
- "Pay the Man", song by Foster the People from the EP III, 2017
- "Pay the Man", song by Mike Doughty and Andrew Livingston from the album Ghost of Vroom 3, 2023
