= Face First =

Face First may refer to:

- Face First (Tribal Tech album)
- Face First (Masque album)
