= Hickory Corners =

Hickory Corners may refer to a place in the United States:

- Hickory Corners, Michigan, a census-designated place in Barry County
- Hickory Corners, New York, a hamlet in Niagara County
- Hickory Corners, Tennessee, an unincorporated community in Chester County.
- Hickory Corners, Wisconsin, an unincorporated community in Oconto County
