= Chester County Courthouse =

Chester County Courthouse may refer to:

- 1724 Chester Courthouse, listed on the National Register of Historic Places (NRHP)
- Chester County Courthouse (Pennsylvania), listed on the NRHP
- Chester County Courthouse (Tennessee), listed on the NRHP
