= Sweet Lips =

Sweet Lips or Sweetlips may refer to:

- Sweet Lips, Tennessee, an unincorporated community in Chester County
- "Sweet Lips", a song by Monaco (band)
- Sweet Lips, George Washington's dog, see United States presidential pets
- Sweetlips (fish), a common name for the fishes in the subfamily Plectorhynchinae
- Sweet Lips, an experimental pop duo from Toronto, Canada
