= Night of the Blade =

Studio album by Tokyo Blade
- Released: 1984
- Studio: Fairview Studios, Kingston upon Hull, England
- Genre: Heavy metal
- Length: 34:22, 65:57 (re-issue)
- Label: Powerstation Records (UK); Combat (USA); Roadrunner (Europe)
- Producer: Roy Neave

Tokyo Blade chronology
Midnight Rendezvous (1984)	Night of the Blade (1984)	Blackhearts and Jaded Spades (1985)

Singles from Night of the Blade
- 1. "Lightning Strikes (Straight Through the Heart)" Released: 1984

Professional ratings
Review scores
Source	Rating
AllMusic	3.5/5 stars
Collector's Guide to Heavy Metal	6/10
Rock Hard	8.5/10

Night of the Blade is the second studio album released by the British heavy metal band Tokyo Blade on Powerstation Records in 1984.

== Background ==
It is the first Tokyo Blade album with Vicki James Wright (Vic Wright) on vocals. He replaced Alan Marsh when the vocal tracks for the album were already completed, forcing him to re-record the lead vocals in a very short time. Marsh's backing vocals remain on the album except on two tracks ("Lightning Strikes" and "Rock Me to the Limit"), which were recorded after he left the band.

== Releases ==
The original vocal recordings by Alan Marsh were released in 1998 in the album re-issue Night of the Blade... The Night Before.

The album was also remastered and reissued in 1997, along with the album Tokyo Blade, by High Vaultage Records, the reissue edition containing the tracks of two EPs released in 1984 and 1985.

== Track listing ==
Side one

1. "Someone to Love" (Andy Boulton, Alan Marsh) – 3:41
2. "Night of the Blade" (Boulton, Marsh) – 4:01
3. "Rock Me to the Limit" (Boulton, Marsh, Vicki James Wright) – 5:54
4. "Warrior of the Rising Sun" (Boulton, Marsh) – 4:25

Side two

5. "Unleash the Beast" (Boulton, Marsh) – 4:32
6. "Love Struck" (Boulton, Marsh, John Wiggins) – 3:43
7. "Dead of the Night" (Boulton, Marsh, Wiggins) – 3:45
8. "Lightning Strikes (Straight Through the Heart)" (Boulton, Marsh, Wright) – 4:21

=== 1997 remastered edition bonus tracks ===
1. "Fever" – 3:28
2. "Attack Attack" – 3:37
3. "Madam Guillotine" – 4:43
4. "Breakout" – 3:44
5. "Monkey's Blood" – 3:43
6. "Schoolhouse Is Burning" – 3:59
7. "Shadows of Insanity" – 5:01
8. "Jezzabell" – 3:20

== Personnel ==
=== Tokyo Blade ===
- Vicki James Wright – lead vocals
- Andy Boulton – lead guitar, backing vocals
- John Wiggins – lead guitar
- Andy Wrighton – bass guitar, backing vocals
- Steve Pierce – drums

=== Production ===
- Roy Neave – producer
- Ralph Jezzard – engineer
- Tony Spath – mixing
