= No Remorse (Tokyo Blade album) =

Studio album by Tokyo Blade
- Released: 1989
- Recorded: 1988
- Studio: Zuckerfabrik Studios, Stuttgart, Germany
- Genre: Heavy metal, glam metal
- Length: 55:56
- Label: Hot Blood Records
- Producer: Robert Baumann & Martin Machwitz

Tokyo Blade chronology
Ain't Misbehavin' (1987)	No Remorse (1989)	Burning Down Paradise (1995)

US edition CD cover

Eye of the Storm album cover

Professional ratings
Review scores
Source	Rating
AllMusic	2.5/5 stars
Collector's Guide to Heavy Metal	1/10

No Remorse is the fifth studio album by the British heavy metal band Tokyo Blade, released in 1989 by the German GAMA Musikverlag sub-label Hot Blood Records. The album was recorded as a collaboration between guitarist Andy Boulton and the German band and label-mates Dead Ballerinas, with songs coming from both parts. The album was poorly promoted and the band fell apart after its release.

No Remorse was re-issued in 1989 with different artwork and amended track listing on Apocalypse Records in the USA. Another reissue, titled Eye of the Storm and including the bonus track "Sunrise in Tokyo", was released in 2008 by the German label Scream.

== Track listings ==
=== Original European LP release ===
1. "1000 Years (Intro) / The Eye of the Storm" (Michael Joseph Sullivan, Michael Pozz) – 4:56
2. "Chains of Love" (Andy Boulton) – 4:50
3. "Dark Night over Paradise" (Pozz) – 4:55
4. "Moonlight in Martini" (Boulton, Pozz) – 4:57
5. "5-Inch Catwalk" (Boulton, Pozz) – 4:53
6. "Crystal Gold" (Peter Prestel, Dave Sale) – 3:33
7. "Angel" (Prestel) – 4:35
8. "Tears Are Not Enough" (Boulton, Pozz) – 3:47
9. "Shadows of Insanity" (Boulton, Pozz) – 5:10

=== Bonus tracks on original European and Japanese CD releases and original South Korean LP release ===
10. "Call Me Angel" (Pozz) – 4:54
11. "Fever" (Hans-Jürgen Astor, Jürgen Schwarz, Pozz) – 4:57
12. "Stop It or Drop" (Astor, Schwarz, Pozz) – 3:59

=== Additional bonus tracks on German CD re-release (Gama, 2008) ===
13. "Heartbreaker" (Boulton) – 4:34
14. "Too Much Too Soon" (Boulton) – 3:25

=== Original North American releases ===
1. "Shadows of Insanity" (Boulton, Pozz) – 5:10
2. "5-Inch Catwalk" (Boulton, Pozz) – 4:53
3. "Fever" (Astor, Schwarz, Pozz) – 4:57
4. "Call Me Angel" (Pozz) – 4:54
5. "Tears Are Not Enough" (Boulton, Pozz) – 3:47
6. "The Eye of the Storm" (Sullivan, Pozz) – 4:56
7. "Crystal Gold" (Prestel, Sale) – 3:33
8. "Chains of Love" (Boulton) – 4:50
9. "Angel" (Prestel) – 4:35
10. "Stop It or Drop" (Astor, Schwarz, Pozz) – 3:59

=== German CD re-release with alternate title Eye of the Storm (Scream, 2008) ===
1. "1000 Years (Intro) / The Eye of the Storm" (Sullivan, Pozz) – 4:56
2. "Chains of Love" (Boulton) – 4:50
3. "Dark Night over Paradise" (Pozz) – 4:55
4. "Moonlight in Martini" (Boulton, Pozz) – 4:57
5. "5-Inch Catwalk" (Boulton, Pozz) – 4:53
6. "Crystal Gold" (Prestel, Sale) – 3:33
7. "Angel" (Prestel) – 4:35
8. "Tears Are Not Enough" (Boulton, Pozz) – 3:47
9. "Shadows of Insanity" (Boulton, Pozz) – 5:10
10. "Call Me Angel" (Pozz) – 4:54
11. "Stop It or Drop" (Astor, Schwarz, Pozz) – 3:59
12. "Fever" (Astor, Schwarz, Pozz) – 4:57
13. "Sunrise in Tokyo" (Boulton, Alan Marsh) – 4:57

=== Mexican CD re-release (Metal Target, 2016) ===
1. "1000 Years (Intro) (Sullivan, Pozz) – 1:10
2. "The Eye of the Storm" (Sullivan, Pozz) – 3:48
3. "Chains of Love" (Boulton) – 4:50
4. "Dark Night over Paradise" (Pozz) – 4:55
5. "Moonlight in Martini" (Boulton, Pozz) – 4:57
6. "5-Inch Catwalk" (Boulton, Pozz) – 4:53
7. "Crystal Gold" (Prestel, Sale) – 3:33
8. "Angel" (Prestel) – 4:35
9. "Tears Are Not Enough" (Boulton, Pozz) – 3:47
10. "Shadows of Insanity" (Boulton, Pozz) – 5:10
11. "Call Me Angel" (Pozz) – 4:54
12. "Fever" (Astor, Schwarz, Pozz) – 4:57
13. "Stop It or Drop" (Astor, Schwarz, Pozz) – 3:59
14. "1000 Years (Intro) / The Eye of the Storm (Advance Tape)" (Sullivan, Pozz) – 4:52
15. "Crystal Gold (Advance Tape)" (Prestel, Sale) – 3:30
16. "Chains of Love (Advance Tape)" (Boulton) – 4:44
17. "Stop It or Drop (Advance Tape)" (Astor, Schwarz, Pozz) – 3:59

=== Brazilian CD re-release (Classic Metal, 2021) ===
1. "1000 Years (Intro) (Sullivan, Pozz) – 1:10
2. "The Eye of the Storm" (Sullivan, Pozz) – 3:48
3. "Chains of Love" (Boulton) – 4:50
4. "Dark Night over Paradise" (Pozz) – 4:55
5. "Moonlight in Martini" (Boulton, Pozz) – 4:57
6. "5-Inch Catwalk" (Boulton, Pozz) – 4:53
7. "Crystal Gold" (Prestel, Sale) – 3:33
8. "Angel" (Prestel) – 4:35
9. "Tears Are Not Enough" (Boulton, Pozz) – 3:47
10. "Shadows of Insanity" (Boulton, Pozz) – 5:10

=== Facts concerning the different releases of this album ===
- There are three different cover artworks of this album: The most common is the one used on the original European and Japanese pressings. The original North American cover artwork differs significantly, as well as the German CD re-release with the album title Eye Of The Storm.
- The track listing of the original North American pressing is completely different to the original European and Japanese pressings. The North American pressings include the songs "Call Me Angel", "Fever" and "Stop It or Drop", which are included on the original European and Japanese CD pressings as bonus tracks and which are not included on the original European LP pressings. Instead, the songs "Dark Night over Paradise" and "Moonlight in Martini" are omitted.
- The German CD re-release by Gama includes two bonus tracks from the previous to No Remorse released album Ain't Misbehavin' called "Heartbreaker" and "Too Much Too Soon".
- The German CD re-release by Scream called Eye of the Storm includes the song "Sunrise in Tokyo", which is taken from the debut album Tokyo Blade, as a bonus track. The song "Call Me Angel" is mistakenly printed "Call Me an Angel" on this release.
- On the Mexican and Brazilian CD re-releases the intro "1000 Years" is split from the song "The Eye of the Storm".
- The Mexican CD re-release is the most comprehensive release of this album so far. It includes additional advance tape demo versions of four of the album tracks. Interestingly, the intro "1000 Years" isn't split from "The Eye of the Storm" on this advance tape version. The song "Stop It or Drop" is mistakenly printed "Stop It or Drop It" on this release.

== Personnel ==
=== Tokyo Blade ===
- Michael Pozz – lead vocals
- Andy Boulton – lead guitar, backing vocals
- Martin Machwitz – keyboards, producer, mixing
- Dave Sale – bass, backing vocals
- Hans-Jürgen Astor – drums

=== Production ===
- Robert Baumann – producer, engineer, mixing
