= Dan Coleman (American football) =

American football player (1962–2026)

No. 90, 91
- Position: Defensive end

Personal information
- Born: August 14, 1962; Lansing, Michigan, U.S.
- Died: January 10, 2026 (aged 63)
- Listed height: 6 ft 4 in (1.93 m)
- Listed weight: 249 lb (113 kg)

Career information
- High school: Chester County (Henderson, Tennessee)
- College: Murray State (1980–1984)
- NFL draft: 1985: undrafted

Career history
- Washington Redskins (1985)*; Minnesota Vikings (1987); Tampa Bay Buccaneers (1988)*
- * Offseason or practice squad member only

Career NFL statistics
- Sacks: 2
- Stats at Pro Football Reference

Daniel Coleman (August 14, 1962 – January 10, 2026) is an American former professional football player who was a defensive end for the Minnesota Vikings of the National Football League (NFL). He played college football for the Murray State Racers. In his career, he played in three games starting in one, where he notched two sacks.

Coleman died January 10, 2026, at the age 63.
