= Jack Boone (writer) =

American author of the 20th century

Jack Happel Boone (1903–1966) was an American writer. He won the O. Henry Award for his short story, Big Singing, in 1932. The only novel he published during his lifetime was Dossie Bell is Dead, released in 1939.

== Biography ==
Boone was born in Trenton, Tennessee, to Elbert Franklin and Martha Ford Boone. He and his family moved to Henderson, Tennessee. After graduating from high school in Henderson, he continued his academic training, first Memphis State College, and then at Vanderbilt University, where he earned B.A. and M.A. degrees. His primary career was teaching writing on the collegiate level, at Georgia Tech, Vanderbilt, the University of Iowa, Mississippi State University, Howard College in Birmingham, Clemson and Rensselaer Polytechnic Institute in Troy, New York, among others.

His greatest commercial success as a writer occurred during the 1930s, when he also collaborated with writer Merle Constiner. Most his success in those years was a writer of short stories. He wrote many short stories, and won the O. Henry Award for short story writing for Big Singing, published in Household Magazine in 1932. His long forgotten and unpublished Neely County short stories are scheduled for publication in the fall of 2022.

However, Boone also authored several novels between 1940 and 1951, none of which were published. In 2020, his long lost sequel to Dossie Bell is Dead was published by BrayBree Publishing Company. The sequel was reassembled after the pages of the manuscript were discovered among two collections. Historian and attorney John E. Talbott, who is also spearheading the collection, editing and publication of Boone's work, reassembled and published the sequel, Woods Girl.

Boone's academic career ended in 1951 and he retired to Henderson, Tennessee, and focused on his writing.

As stated earlier, Boone's first and only published novel during his lifetime was Dossie Bell Is Dead (1939). A review in The News and Observer (Raleigh, North Carolina) praised its "strong plot" and "strong characterizations." Another in The Courier-Journal (Louisville, Kentucky) wrote that "its author writes so well, creating suspense by little touches as he reveals his characters, that no one who begins his book will want to put it down."

Many of Boone's papers were donated to the archives of Freed-Hardeman University, a private Christian school located in his hometown of Henderson.
