= Vincent High School =

Vincent High School may refer to any of several institutions, including:

- Harold S. Vincent High School
- Chester County Training School (whose name was changed to Vincent High School in 1963)
- Strong Vincent High School

== See also ==
- St. Vincent's High School
