= The Innocent Ones (Blue Tears album) =

Studio album by Blue Tears
- Released: April 21, 2006; June 6, 2006
- Genre: Hard rock
- Label: AOR Heaven
- Producer: Gregg Fulkerson

Blue Tears chronology
Dancin' On the Back Streets (2005)	The Innocent Ones (2006)

The Innocent Ones is the fourth and final album released by the late–1980s hard rock band, Blue Tears. It is their first album of new material since their 1990 self-titled debut.

Mad, Bad and Dangerous and Dancin' On the Back Streets, both released in 2005, were studio albums compiled from unreleased material recorded in the 90's or earlier.

The only returning member of the original band is frontman, singer, and songwriter, Gregg Fulkerson. It is also his last album, as he died on April 14, 2009.

== Track listing ==
1. "Drive"
2. "Let It Rain"
3. "Run for Your Life"
4. "The Innocent Ones"
5. "Save Yourself"
6. "Fast Times"
7. "In Your Dreams"
8. "All the Way Home"
9. "She Wants to Be a Star"
10. "Gloryland"
11. "Break My Heart"
12. "Silent Scream"
13. "Money to Burn"
14. "Unrequited Love"

== Personnel ==
- Gregg Fulkerson - vocals, guitar, keyboards
- Bryan Wolski - bass, backing vocals
- Robert Streets - drums, percussion
