= Mad, Bad and Dangerous =

Studio album by Blue Tears
- Released: July 26, 2005
- Recorded: 1990–1992
- Genre: Hard rock
- Length: 72:52
- Label: Suncity
- Producer: Gregg Fulkerson

Blue Tears chronology
Blue Tears (1990)	Mad, Bad and Dangerous (2005)	Dancin' On the Back Streets (2005)

Mad, Bad and Dangerous is the second album released by the late-80s hard rock band Blue Tears. The album was one of many recordings by the band which went unreleased following the increased popularity of alternative and grunge music.

Long after the band members got involved in other projects, some of these unreleased material started to surface on the Internet. Bandleader Gregg Fulkerson decided to compile an album of most of this material and release it officially.

The album was finally released in 2005 by Suncity Records. It marked, perhaps, the return of the band, since they released an all-new album The Innocent Ones the following year.

== Track listing ==
All songs written by Gregg Fulkerson except where noted.

No.	Title	Writer(s)	Length
1.	"Long Way Home"		4:02
2.	"Girl Crazy"	Gregg Fulkerson; Michael Spears	3:56
3.	"With You Tonight"		4:30
4.	"Mystery Man"		3:57
5.	"Rock You to Heaven"	Gregg Fulkerson; Michael Spears; Ron Hutchens	4:27
6.	"Evidence of Love"		4:23
7.	"Mad, Bad & Dangerous to Know"		4:57
8.	"Misty Blue"		5:43
9.	"Kisses in the Dark"		4:37
10.	"Everywhere I Go"		4:05
11.	"Midnight Train"		5:35
12.	"Follow Your Heart"		4:18
13.	"Russia Tonight"		5:36
14.	"Love Machine"	Gregg Fulkerson; Bryan Hall	3:51
15.	"The Last Serenade"		5:03
16.	"Live It Up"		3:58
Total length:			1:12:52

== Personnel ==
- Gregg Fulkerson - vocals, guitar
- Charlie Lauderdale - drums
- Bryan Hall - guitar, vocals
- Michael Spears - bass
