= Hickory Corners, Tennessee =

- Unincorporated community
- Location within Tennessee Location within the United States
- Coordinates: 35°20′36″N 88°42′9″W
- Country: United States
- State: Tennessee
- County: Chester
- Elevation: 486 ft (148 m)
- Time zone: UTC-6 (Central (CST))
  - Summer (DST): UTC-5 (CDT)
- ZIP code: 38340 (Henderson)
- Area code: 731
- GNIS feature ID: 1287565

Hickory Corners is an unincorporated community in Chester County, Tennessee, United States.

== History ==
The Hickory Corner School was built in 1914. The school property had a large Hickory Tree on each corner, therefore the school and community became known as Hickory Corners. Today there is a very active Community Center located at 465 Laurel Hill Road, Tennessee State Route 225 (SR 225). There is no Post Office in Hickory Corners; it, along with most of Chester County is served out of the Post Office in Henderson, Tennessee.

== Geography ==
Hickory Corners is located on Tennessee State Route 225 south of Montezuma, Tennessee and the Silerton Road. The Old Friendship Road is on the Southeastern side of Hickory Corners community.
