= Dancin' On the Back Streets =

2005 studio/compilation album by Blue Tears

Studio album by Blue Tears
- Released: December 5, 2005
- Recorded: 1990–1992
- Genre: Hard rock
- Label: Suncity
- Producer: Gregg Fulkerson

Blue Tears chronology
| Mad, Bad and Dangerous (2005) | Dancin' On the Back Streets (2005) | The Innocent Ones (2006) |

Dancin' On the Back Streets is the third album by the late-1980s hard rock band Blue Tears. Long after the band members got involved in other projects, some of their unreleased material started to surface on the Internet. Band leader Gregg Fulkerson decided to compile an album of most of this material and release it officially. That was the second compilation album, released the same year as Mad, Bad and Dangerous. It was released December 5, 2005.

The album was rated 4 out of 5 stars by Get Ready to ROCK!.

== Track listing ==
1. "Summer Girl"
2. "Loud Guitars, Fast Cars & Wild, Wild Women"
3. "Kiss And Tell"
4. "Storm In My Heart"
5. "Slip And Fall"
6. "A Date With Destiny"
7. "All Cried Out"
8. "Forever Yours"
9. "Do You Want Me?"
10. "Small Town Dreams"
11. "Livin' In The Movies"
12. "She's Not Falling In Love"
13. "Strong"
14. "Touch"
15. "Dark of The Night"
16. "Dream of Me"

== Band ==
- Gregg Fulkerson – lead vocals, guitars and keyboards
- Bryan Hall – guitar and vocals
- Michael Spears – bass and vocals
- Charlie Lauderdale – drums and percussion
