= Warchild (album) =

Compilation album by Paul Di'Anno's Battlezone
- Released: 1988
- Genre: Heavy metal
- Length: 73:33
- Label: Powerstation Records
- Producer: Ian Richardson

Paul Di'Anno's Battlezone chronology
Children of Madness (1987)	Warchild (1988)	Feel My Pain (1998)

Warchild is a collection of songs from the two previous albums by Paul Di'Anno's Battlezone. Two songs had not been published on any previous Battlezone albums.

The album was released in 1988, and was the last album Paul Di'Anno released as Battlezone until Feel My Pain in 1998.

== Track listing ==
1. "(Forever) Fighting Back" - 2:21
2. "Welcome to the Battlezone" - 3:25
3. "Warchild" - 2:51
4. "The Land God Gave to Caine" - 7:20
5. "Too Much to Heart" - 4:46
6. "Voice on the Radio" - 3:10
7. "Rising Star" (bonus track) - 4:00
8. "Rit It Up" - 2:52
9. "I Don't Wanna Know" - 3:28
10. "Nuclear Breakdown" - 5:01
11. "Torch of Hate" - 3:04
12. "Whispered Rage" - 4:50
13. "Children of Madness" - 5:29
14. "Metal Tears" 6:12
15. "It's Love" - 3:46
16. "Overloaded" - 3:16
17. "The Promise" - 3:49
18. "To the Limit" (bonus track) - 3:53

Tracks 1–6 are from Fighting Back.
Tracks 8–17 are from Children of Madness.
Tracks 7 and 18 were not released on previous Battlezone albums.

== Personnel ==
- Paul Di'Anno - lead vocals
- Pete West - bass
- John Wiggins - guitar
- Graham Bath - guitar (tracks 8–18)
- John Hurley - guitar (tracks 1–7)
- Steve Hopgood - drums (tracks 8–18)
- Bob Falck - drums (tracks 1–7)
