= Masque (band) =

American band

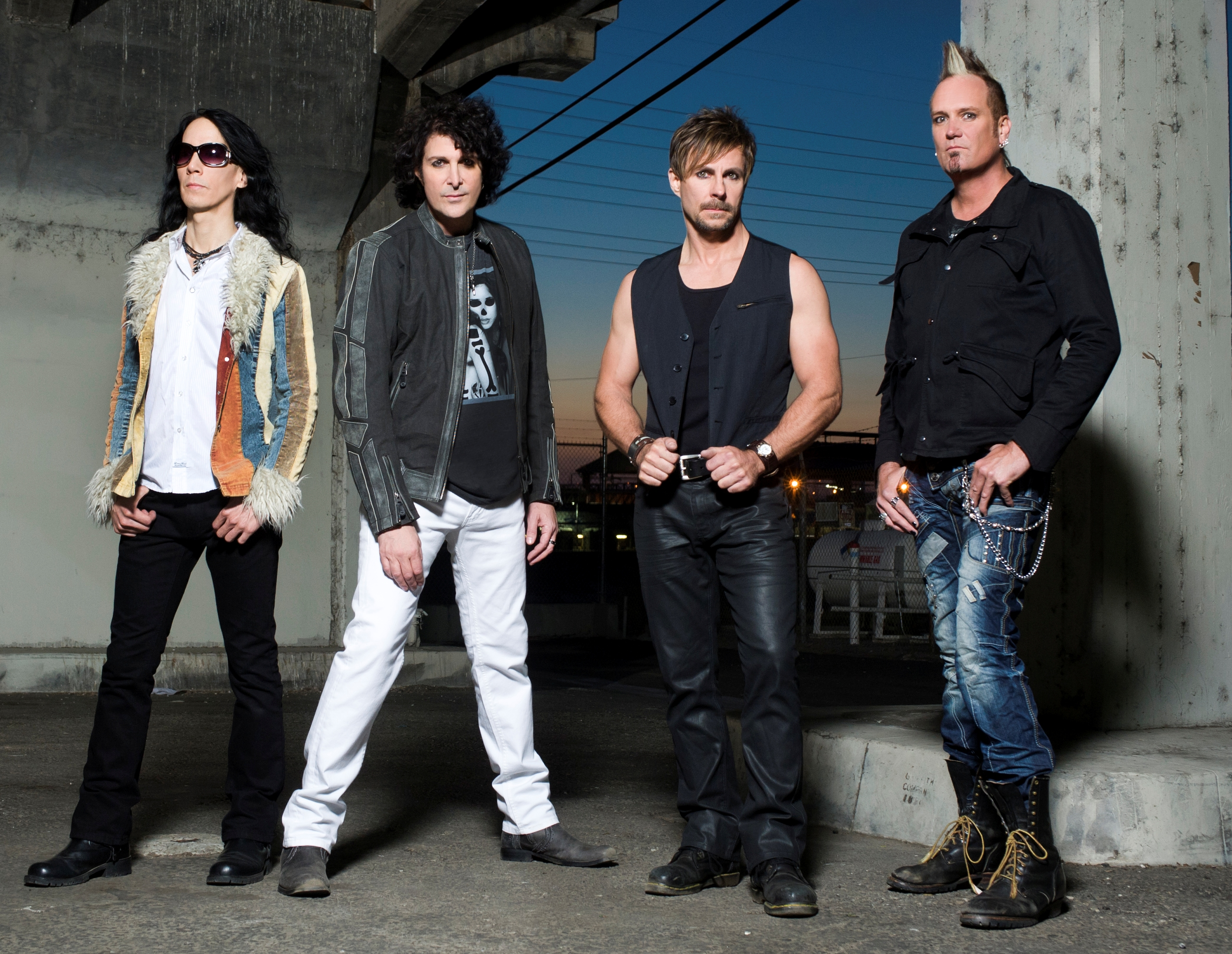

Background information
- Origin: Hollywood, California, United States
- Genres: Glam metal, hard rock, heavy metal
- Labels: Grand Cru Music; Suncity Records
- Members: Tony Kelly; Kevin James; Bruff Brigham; Scotty Kormos
- Past members: Johnny Haro; Dale Fine; Ross Cristao; Mark Goodin
- Website: masqueband.com

Masque is an American metal band.

== History ==
=== 1980s ===
Masque was formed in Hollywood, California, in April 1985. Masque was formed by lead vocalist Tony Kelly after he departed Hollywood-based band Network featuring Drew Forsyth, drummer of the original Quiet Riot with guitarist Randy Rhoads. The name Masque, along with the bands elaborate costumes and stage artwork, were influenced by the festive courtly entertainment commonly known as a masque which flourished in sixteenth- and early-seventeenth-century Europe.

Masque performed live for the first time on July 18, 1985, at the Troubadour night club in West Hollywood. Between 1985 and 1989, the band performed live and recorded 16 songs that were never officially released to the public until 2008.

=== 2008 to present ===
In March 2008 Masque released a CD titled Face First on Suncity Records featuring 11 songs recorded between 1985 & 1988. Fueled by social media exposure, the band experienced a major resurgence in popularity with fans around the world. Renewed popularity led to a Masque reunion in 2010 to record their first single in twenty years, titled “Body Mind & Soul” produced by Keith Olsen and featuring a music video directed by Mark Jacobs. Masque released the second single and video, titled "Rock n Roll Dog", on April 30, 2012, also produced by Keith Olsen and directed by Mark Jacobs. The current members of Masque are involved in various projects outside the band, including Scotty Kormos, who is the house drummer for American game show The Singing Bee. On May 5, 2011, vocalist Tony Kelly was inducted into the Las Vegas Rock Reunion Hall of Fame with Belladonna, a Las Vegas band which he fronted as lead singer between 1979 and 1981.

== Discography ==
- Face First (Suncity Records, 2008)
