= Chester County High School =

Public high school in Tennessee, United States

Location
- 552 East Main Street; Henderson, Tennessee 38340; 35.44023°N 88.62827°W

Information
- Type: Public grades 9–12
- Motto: Respect. Trust. Honor.
- Established: 1913
- Principal: Clay Murley
- Faculty: 48
- Enrollment: 809 (2023–2024)
- Colors: Royal blue and White
- Mascot: Eagle
- Website: hs.chestercountyschools.org

Chester County High School is a high school (grades 9–12) in Henderson, Chester County, Tennessee. It is the only high school operated by Chester County School District and is fed by Chester County Junior High School.

== History ==
In 1909 Chester County High School (for whites only) was established in the Georgie Robertson Christian College building (later known as the Milan-Sitka Building on the campus of Freed-Hardeman University). The number of high school students in 1913 was 50; this increased to 101 students by 1914. The school for 1915–16 was divided into grammar school, junior high, and high school. The curriculum during these first years included English, math, home economics, geography, general science, biology, physics, chemistry, agriculture and history. Sixteen units were required for graduation, beginning in 1916.

When public transport improved in the 1930s, the enrollment in the school began to expand. An annex was added to the original building and several residential houses were bought for the overflow. Despite more than 1,000 students attending the small school, it continued to be in the same building until 1951.

The second building for Chester County High School was the finest one in West Tennessee at that time and cost $500,000. The gymnasium was the largest in the area and became the site for many regional basketball tournaments.

When the East Chester Elementary School was completed in 1962 the Georgie Robertson Christian College building became vacant. It was sold to Freed-Hardeman University and became known as the Milan-Sitka Building, although it was finally demolished in 2004. The profits from this sale were used to build an auditorium at the high school in the early 1970s.

In 1968, as the result of desegregation, CCHS was merged with Chester County Training School, the former high school for African American students.l In 1997, Chester County High School moved to its third new building, situated next to the second one, which is now serving as Chester County Middle School (4th–5th grades).

== Notable alumni ==
- Dan Coleman (American football), former NFL defensive end
