= Quaade =

Quaade is a surname. Notable people with the surname include:

- Michelle Lauge Quaade (born 1991), Danish cyclist
- Rasmus Quaade (born 1990), Danish cyclist
- George Quaade (born 1889), Danish painter

== See also ==
- Quade
