= Joseph Alexander Cain =

American artist

- Born: May 27, 1920; Henderson, Tennessee, U.S.
- Died: September 8, 1980 (aged 60); Corpus Christi, Texas, U.S.
- Education: University of California, Berkeley
- Occupations: Artist; educator; art critic

Joseph Alexander Cain (27 May 1920 – 8 September 1980) was an American artist, educator, and art critic. He led a combat art team during the Korean War, received degrees from the University of California at Berkeley, and was recognized for his art at the local, state, national, and international levels, being elected a Fellow of the Royal Society of Arts in London. Cain served the art community as educator, originator of the National Drawing and Small Sculpture Show at Del Mar College in Corpus Christi, Texas, and art critic. Personal and professional documents are included in the Archives of American Art at the Smithsonian Institution.

== Artist ==
Joseph Alexander Cain was an American painter and mosaicist who was born in Henderson, Tennessee, on 27 May 1920, and died on 8 September 1980, in Corpus Christi, Texas. Cain attained the rank of colonel in the United States Marine Corps, having served in World War II and the Korean War when he led a combat art team for the USMC in Korea in 1951. Cain received his bachelor’s degree in art in 1947 and a master’s degree in art in 1948 from the University of California at Berkeley and moved to Corpus Christi, Texas, in 1948.

He had 150 one-person exhibitions, received 250 awards, and participated in local, state, national, and international exhibits. His art is found in the Witte Museum, Springfield Museum, Tyler Museum, George Segal Collection, and Marisol Escobar Collection among others, and his works toured with the Old Bergin Art Guild, the National Society of Painters in Casein and Acrylic, and the Grumbacher Company and have been displayed in Mexico, France, Canada, and Japan. Joseph G. Butler, director of the Butler Institute of American Art, observed that Homage to a Harlequin, Cain’s top prizewinning painting at the Butler Institute, “stirred in me a deep fascination for its unusual and seemingly reckless application of paint while retaining a boldly conceived design.” Reflecting on Cain’s top award-winning watercolor, Search for New Images No. 7, in the Pennsylvania Academy of Fine Arts Exhibition in Philadelphia, Albert Christ-Janer of the Pratt Institute spoke of Cain’s “[t]echnical competence, which I always like in a watercolor. Strong design, which is good anywhere at any time.”

Cain was active in his community with the South Texas Art League, Texas Watercolor Society, Texas Fine Arts Association, Corpus Christi Art Foundation, Corpus Christi Municipal Arts Commission, and Board of Trustees for the Art Museum of South Texas. He executed a mosaic mural at Christus Spohn Hospital Corpus Christi-Shoreline and other murals in Corpus Christi. Amy Smith Kight in Legacy: A History of the Art Museum of South Texas, wrote, “Perhaps no artist’s name occurs with more frequency and reverence in the recollections of Corpus Christi artists and collectors than that of Joseph A. Cain. . . . With his understanding of current movements in modern art and his experimentations with various styles and materials, Cain served as a model for Corpus Christi artists.” He was listed in Who’s Who in America, Who’s Who in American Art, Who’s Who in the South and Southwest, and Who’s Who in American Education and elected a Fellow of the Royal Society of Arts in London in 1964.

== Educator ==
Cain taught at Corpus Christi High School, W. B. Ray High School, and Del Mar College where he served as a professor and chairperson of the art department and began the National Drawing and Small Sculpture Show at Del Mar College in 1966. After his death, the top award of the show was named for him, and the gallery where the exhibit is held annually was named the Joseph A. Cain Memorial Art Gallery. Explaining Cain’s motivation to begin this show, Eddie Lambert, professor emeritus of art at Del Mar College, wrote, “Joseph Cain’s original intention was to bring noteworthy people from the art world so that students and community could benefit from the experience.” Students and the community were exposed to such jurors as Charles Umlauf, George Segal, Frank Gallo, Peter Voulkos, Duane Hanson, Seymour Lipton, Marisol Escobar, Mel Ramos, John Chamberlain, James Surls, Jesus Bautista Moroles, and many others since the inception of the show.

== Art critic ==
Cain was also an art critic for the Caller Times newspaper in Corpus Christi from 1955 to 1974. Additionally, he published articles in The Southern Artist, Ford Times, Texas Trends, Art Voices South, and Texas Artist, and his art “appeared frequently on the covers of AMT [The American Music Teacher].” After his passing, personal and professional papers were added to the Archives of American Art at the Smithsonian Institution; such documents include correspondence, a manuscript on painting, photographs, recordings of lectures, and art reviews.
