= Robert I. Chester =

American politician

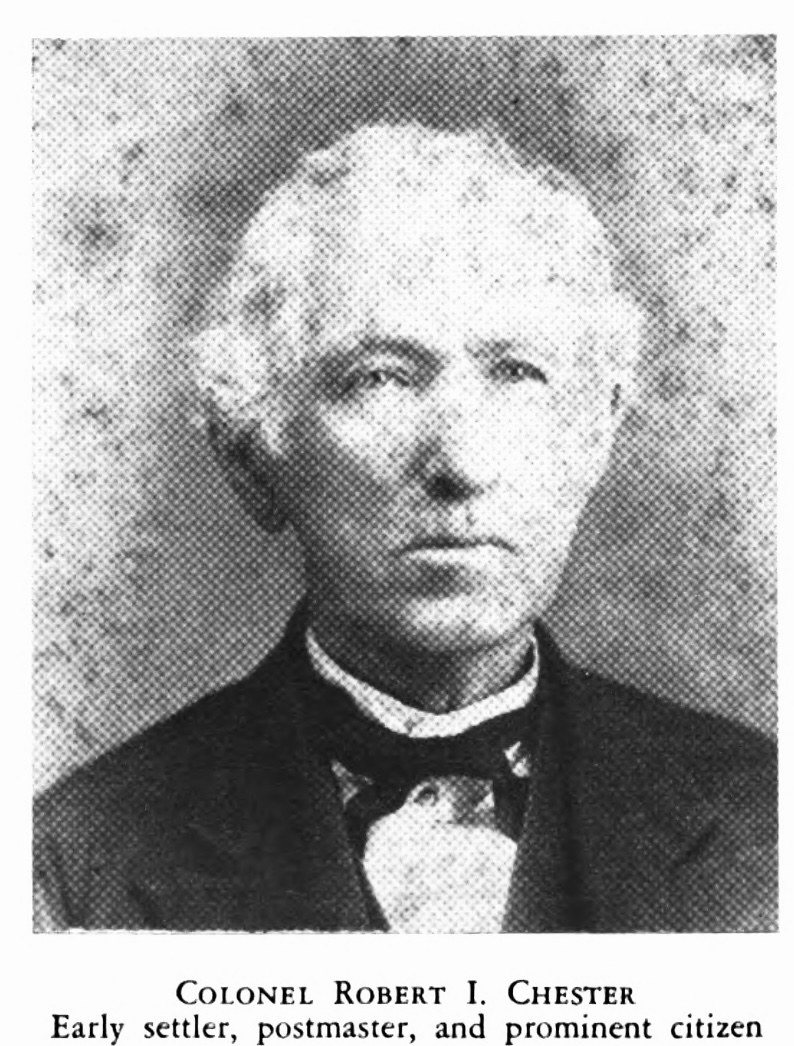
Robert I. Chester, Jackson, Tennessee

Robert I. Chester (July 31, 1793 – January 14, 1892) was a Tennessee Democratic politician, merchant, surveyor, farmer, United States Marshal, postmaster and soldier. He served two terms in the Tennessee House of Representatives. Chester County, Tennessee is named after him.

== Early life ==
Chester was born in Carlisle, Pennsylvania on July 31, 1793. He was raised in Jonesboro in East Tennessee, and was educated in local "field schools". He served in the War of 1812 as quartermaster of the Third Tennessee Regiment, having enlisted at Knoxville on October 14, 1814. In 1816 he became a merchant at Carthage in partnership with his uncle Robert Allen, until in 1819 Allen became a Congressman and Chester went into the tobacco business, in which he is reported to have lost a fortune. In 1822 he was appointed by the Legislature as surveyor for Smith County. From 1824 to 1830 he was a merchant in Jackson, from 1825 to 1833 also serving as postmaster of that town. His postmaster appointment was made due to the influence of Andrew Jackson.

In 1835 he left for Texas, where he was appointed by Governor Sam Houston a colonel in the Texas Revolutionary Army, but in the wake of the Texans' victory in the Battle of San Jacinto there was little for him to do for Texas. He returned to Jackson in 1836, and was reappointed postmaster and appointed registrar of the western land district, and remained in the land business for many years thereafter.

== Politics and patronage appointments ==
In 1837 he was appointed by President Martin Van Buren to the title of United States marshal for the western district, and served with one or more intermissions until 1861. (For instance he was reappointed marshal of the Western District in 1844.) He was a lifelong Democrat, having been a close friend of General Andrew Jackson, and married a niece of Jackson's. He was elected to the Tennessee House of Representatives in 1870 and re-elected in 1872, and in 1884 was one of the Tennessee Democratic electors.

== Personal life ==
Chester and his family lost considerable wealth during the American Civil War, losing both slaves and actual property; during the war all four of his sons had served in the Confederate Army. He became a member of the Masons in 1817, and a Knight Templar. His first wife was Elizabeth Hays (niece of Andrew Jackson's wife, Rachel Donelson). the aforementioned niece of Jackson, by whom he had seven children: Mary Jane, John, Robert Hayes, Martha Butler, William Butler, Andrew Jackson and Samuel Hayes. After her death, in 1855 Chester married a widow, Jane P. Donelson.

He died in Jackson, Tennessee on January 14, 1892 at the age of 98.

== See also ==
- John Donelson § Descendants
