= Walton Bryan Stewart =

American politician and labor activist (1914–1976)

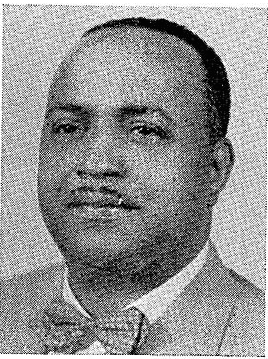

Member of the Wisconsin State Assembly from the Milwaukee 2nd district
- In office January 3, 1955 – January 7, 1957
- Preceded by: Michael F. O'Connell
- Succeeded by: Norman Sussman

Personal details
- Born: April 20, 1914 Henderson, Tennessee, U.S.
- Died: May 10, 1976 (aged 62) Milwaukee, Wisconsin, U.S.
- Party: Democratic
- Spouse: Gertrude
- Education: Lane College

Walton Bryan Stewart (April 20, 1914 – May 10, 1976) was an American teacher, machinist, labor activist, and Democratic politician. He served one term in the Wisconsin State Assembly, representing part of the north side of the city of Milwaukee.

== Early life and career ==
Stewart was born in Henderson, Tennessee. He graduated from Lane College, and became a teacher in Henderson, eventually serving as principal of Chester County Training School. In 1944, he moved to Milwaukee, Wisconsin, where he became active in the labor movement and in the Democratic Party.

== Politics ==
Stewart, active in the labor movement, was chairman for several years of the 6th ward Democratic Party, and was elected a delegate at large to the 1952 Democratic National Convention.

He was elected to the Wisconsin House of Representatives in 1954 to represent the newly-redistricted 2nd Milwaukee County district (now consisting of the 2nd Ward of the City of Milwaukee); fellow Democrat Michael F. O'Connell, whose district had included what was now the 2nd District, was not a candidate for re-election. He won the September 1954 Democratic primary with 983 votes to 829 for former Assemblyman Le Roy Simmons and the November general election with 3,851 votes to 1,230 for Republican George Wolfgram and 29 for independent Albert Stergar. He was assigned to the standing committee on elections.

In the 1956 primary, he lost the Democratic nomination to Norman Sussman, with 1,028 votes to Sussman's 1,082. He ran in the general election as an "Independent Democrat", but came in third, with 1,030 votes to Sussman's 3,879 and Republican Paul Urban's 1,406.

== Later life ==
Walton was the only African-American member of the Milwaukee Motion Picture Commission in its last years (it was abolished in 1971).

He continued to work as a teacher and was head of the mathematics department at Roosevelt Junior High School in Milwaukee. He died on May 10, 1976.

Wisconsin State Assembly
Preceded by Michael F. O'Connell	Member of the Wisconsin State Assembly from the Milwaukee 2nd district January 3, 1955 – January 7, 1957	Succeeded by Norman Sussman
