= Quade =

Given name

Quade is both a surname and a given name. Notable people with the name include:

== People with the surname ==
- Edward Schaumberg Quade, mathematician
- Henriette Quade (born 1984), German politician
- Jack Quade, fictional character in the Australian medical drama All Saints
- Jay Quade (born 1955), American geochemist and geologist
- John Quade (1938–2009), American character actor who starred in film and in television
- Mary Quade (born 1971), American poet and essayist
- Mike Quade (born 1957), manager of the Chicago Cubs
- Ricky Quade (born 1950), former Australian rules footballer who played with South Melbourne in the VFL during the 1970s

== People with the given name ==
- Quade Cooper (born 1988), Australian rugby union player for the Queensland Reds
- Quade Winter (born 1951), American composer, musical restorer and translator, specializing in the light operas of Victor Herbert

== See also ==
- Quaade
- Quaid (disambiguation)
- Quad (disambiguation)
