= Midnight Rendezvous =

EP by Tokyo Blade
- Released: 1984
- Recorded: early 1983
- Studio: Cave Studios, Bristol, UK
- Genre: Heavy metal
- Length: 18:30
- Label: Powerstation Records
- Producer: Andy Allen

Tokyo Blade chronology
Tokyo Blade (1983)	Midnight Rendezvous (1984)	Night of the Blade (1984)

US LP cover

Professional ratings
Review scores
Source	Rating
AllMusic	EP
AllMusic	LP

Midnight Rendezvous is an EP by the British heavy metal band Tokyo Blade, released in 1984 through the UK independent record label Powerstation Records. The songs were recorded in early 1983 when the band was called Genghis Khan and originally released as double 7" single "Double Dealin".

The four tracks of the EP, combined with four tracks of the band's first album, Tokyo Blade, were published as an LP during the same year by Combat Records in the US, under the title Midnight Rendezvous. This EP was included in the re-release on CD of the album Tokyo Blade in 1997.

== Track listing ==
Music by Andy Boulton, lyrics by Alan Marsh

1. "Midnight Rendezvous" – 3:22
2. "Mean Streak" – 4:44
3. "If Heaven Is Hell" – 6:00
4. "Highway Passion" – 4:24

=== US edition LP ===
1. "Midnight Rendezvous" – 3:22
2. "Break the Chains" – 5:07
3. "If Heaven Is Hell" – 6:04
4. "Mean Streak" – 4:44
5. "Powergame" – 4:12
6. "Highway Passion" – 4:24
7. "Killer City" – 5:47
8. "Sunrise in Tokyo" – 5:47

== Personnel ==
=== Tokyo Blade ===
- Alan Marsh – lead vocals
- Andy Boulton – guitar
- Ray Dismore– guitar
- Andy Robbins – bass guitar
- Steve Pierce – drums

=== Additional musicians ===
- John Wiggins – guitar on tracks 2, 5, 7 and 8 of the US LP
