= Johnny Crash =

American rock band

- Origin: Los Angeles, California, U.S.
- Genres: Hard rock, heavy metal
- Years active: 1985–1992
- Labels: WTG, Columbia, Suncity
- Past members: Christopher Stewart; Vick Wright; Stephen "Punky" Adamo; August Worchell; Terry Nails; Andy Rogers; J.J. Bolt; Dizzy Reed; Matt Sorum

Johnny Crash was an American hard rock band formed in 1985. Members originally included former Tokyo Blade singer Vick Wright (Vicki James Wright), former Champaign guitarists Christopher Stewart and August Worchell, bassist Andy Rogers, and former Rock City Angels drummer Stephen "Punkee" Adamo. Their sound was likened to that of AC/DC, and contemporaries Junkyard, Rhino Bucket and The Four Horsemen.

== History ==
In 1990, the band released their first album, Neighbourhood Threat, featuring Vicki James Wright (vocals), August Worchell (guitar and backing vocals), Christopher Stewart (guitar and backing vocals), Stephen "Punky" Adamo (drums) and Terry Nails (bass). The band, with Andy Rogers on bass, toured for a short time with bands such as Mötley Crüe and Pretty Maids. The single "Hey Kid" became a minor hit and its video received some rotation on MTV.

Guitarist J.J. Bolt and then-future Guns N' Roses members Dizzy Reed and Matt Sorum joined the band to replace Worchell and Adamo. However, before the second album could be released Johnny Crash were dropped by their record label, and Stewart suggested moving to Europe. James Wright disagreed and the band split up.

In 1992, bassist Andy Rogers died of a heroin overdose.

In 2007, an interview with Vicki James Wright stated that the then unreleased album, now titled Unfinished Business, will come out on Suncity Records sometime "soon". In 2008, Unfinished Business was released on Suncity Records.

Vicki James Wright has since gone back to his original name, Vick Wright.

== Members ==
- Christopher Stewart – rhythm guitar, backing vocals (1985–1992)
- Vicki James "Vick" Wright – lead vocals (1985–1992)
- Stephen "Punkee" Adamo – drums (1985–1991)
- August Worchell – lead guitar, backing vocals (1985–1991)
- Terry Nails – bass (1985–1990)
- Andy Rogers – bass (1990–1992; died 1992)
- J.J. Bolt – lead guitar, backing vocals (1991–1992)
- Bobby "Spanky" Wilson – drums (1992)
- Dizzy Reed – keyboards, guitar (1991–1992)
- Matt Sorum – drums (1991–1992)

== Discography ==
- Neighbourhood Threat (1990)
- Unfinished Business (2008)
