= Lessdress =

Polish hard rock band

Lessdress is a Polish glam metal / hard rock band originally formed under the name Ferrum in Warsaw in 1984. Lessdress is arguably the most successful glam metal band from Poland, having played the largest hard rock and metal festivals in Central Europe including the Przystanek Woodstock festival and opened for among others Def Leppard. Their first two albums are recognized collector's items fetching hundreds of dollars on eBay. Due to high demand, the band reformed in 2007 and their debut album Dumblondes was remastered and re-released the following year by the Australian label Suncity Records.

Frontman, vocalist and main songwriter Pawel Nowakowski, the son of career diplomats, grew up mostly outside of Poland, in London from age 8 and until 15 and then Washington, D.C., from the age of 18. Pawel's brother is vocalist Adam Nowakowski of Warsaw band Incrowd who recorded two albums in the mid-1990s.

In Washington Pawel formed the band Steel Knickers, who appeared in an article in Kerrang! highlighting two new American bands, the other being Metallica. Steel Knickers recorded a three track demo in 1984, and one of the songs "Bloody Hard" appeared on the compilation album "Mutopia". Steel Knickers were negotiating a deal with MCA but could not complete it as Nowakowski was not allowed to work in the US and also wanted to go back to his girlfriend and studies at ASP (Academy of Fine Arts) in Warsaw. Eventually he had to return to Poland when his father's diplomatic assignment ended.

Upon his return to Warsaw, Poland in 1984, he formed a new band, Ferrum. Ferrum was active from 1984 to 1989 and in 1986 they played the Jarocin and MetalMania festivals in Poland. Following a change in style and line-up, the band became Lessdress in 1989. The band's debut album Dumblondes was released the same year and was influenced by Van Halen, Mötley Crüe and Def Leppard.

Lessdress recorded their second album Love Industry in 1991, but it was not released until 1994 on the Austrian label Schubert Records. The influences on this album included the bluesier sound of Poison on their recent album Flesh & Blood and also Skid Row and Guns N' Roses. The band split up in 1995, and attempted a reunion already in 1997. This reunion did not produce any recordings and fell apart in 1999 due to the death of bass player Slawomir Onacik.

2007 the remaining members reunited with a new bass guitarist and the same year they released their third album Sugarfree. The sound was a departure from their previous recordings and they continued in a similar but more melodic direction with their latest album, 2014's Fools Die Young. The Australian label Suncity Records re-released the band's debut album Dumblondes in 2008. In 2015, Lessdress supported Def Leppard on their tour in Poland including a show at Warsaw's Torwar.

Lessdress main man Pawel Nowakowski is also known as creative director for the Warsaw digital agency Grandes Kochonos with top name clients like ING and Kenwood.
