= Black Hearts & Jaded Spades =

Studio album by Tokyo Blade
- Released: 1985
- Recorded: 1985
- Studios: Village Recorders, Dagenham, East London, UK
- Genres: Hard rock, heavy metal
- Length: 44:28
- Label: Tokyo Blade Records
- Producers: Ian Richardson, Tokyo Blade

Tokyo Blade chronology
| Night of the Blade (1984) | Black Hearts & Jaded Spades (1985) | Ain't Misbehavin' (1987) |

Singles from Black Hearts & Jaded Spades
- 1. "Undercover Honeymoon" Released: 1985

Professional ratings
Review scores
| Source | Rating |
|---|---|
| AllMusic | 1/5 stars |
| Collector's Guide to Heavy Metal | 5/10 |
| Metal Forces | 73/100 |

Black Hearts & Jaded Spades is the third studio album by English heavy metal band Tokyo Blade. It was originally released in 1985 on Tokyo Blade own record label and in the same year reissued by SPV/Steamhammer. The keyboard-laden compositions of this album and the strongly down-tuned guitar sound, marks the complete detachment of the band from their new wave of British heavy metal roots. It was interpreted as an attempt to conquer the American and Japanese markets, where glam and pop metal acts dominated the charts, but to no avail.

The album was reissued on a remastered CD edition in 2002 and 2008 by Razar Ice Records and in 2009 by Lost And Found Records, with four additional tracks.

== Track listings ==
All tracks by Vicki James Wright and Andy Boulton, except "Make It Through the Night" by Boulton, Wright and John Wiggins

Side one

1. "Dirty Faced Angels" – 3:27
2. "Make It Through the Night" – 4:00
3. "Always" – 3:33
4. "Loving You Is an Easy Thing to Do" – 3:39
5. "Undercover Honeymoon" – 4:19
6. "You Are the Heart" – 4:57

Side two

7. "Blackhearts and Jaded Spades" – 3:55
8. "Tough Guys Tumble" – 3:26
9. "Dancing in Blue Moonlight" – 4:21
10. "Playroom of Poison Dreams" – 5:20
11. "Monkeys Blood" – 3:05
12. "The Magic Roundabout" – 0:45

=== Additional track listing (2009 reissue) ===
13. "Undercover Honeymoon" (remix)
14. "Stealing the Thief"
15. "Playroom of Poison Dreams" (remix)
16. "Bottom End"

== Personnel ==
Tokyo Blade

- Vicki James Wright – lead vocals, harmonica
- Andy Boulton – lead guitar, backing vocals
- John Wiggins – lead guitar
- Andy Wrighton – bass, backing vocals
- Steve Pierce – drums

Additional musicians

- Nick Coler – keyboards

Production

- Ian Richardson – producer
