= Woodville, Tennessee =

Unincorporated community in Tennessee, US

Coordinates: 35°15′38″N 88°45′19″W

Woodville is an unincorporated community in Chester County, Tennessee.

== History ==
Woodville is a community located along Tennessee State Route 225 and was originally part of McNairy County, but became part of Chester County when that county was formed. During the Civil War sentiment was divided in this area, as with other parts of Tennessee, between the Union and Confederacy. Fielding Hurst formed a Union Cavalry Regiment from people in this area. This area has been referred to by some historians as The Hurst Nation.

== Geography ==
The community is situated on Tennessee State Route 225.
