= Ain't Misbehavin' (Tokyo Blade album) =

Studio album by Tokyo Blade
- Released: 1987
- Studios: Zuckerfabrik Studios, Stuttgart, Germany
- Genres: Hard rock, glam metal, heavy metal
- Length: 35:12
- Label: Scratch Records
- Producers: Tom Krüger, Tokyo Blade

Tokyo Blade chronology
Black Hearts & Jaded Spades (1985)	Ain't Misbehavin' (1987)	No Remorse (1989)

Singles from Ain't Misbehavin'
- 1. "Movie Star" Released: 1987

1993 edition CD cover
- The album was re-issued with the name Tokyo Blade

Professional ratings
Review scores
Source	Rating
AllMusic	2/5 stars

Ain't Misbehavin' is the fourth studio album by the British heavy metal band Tokyo Blade, released in 1987 by the German GAMA Musikverlag sub-label Scratch Records. The album was recorded with a completely new line-up assembled by Andy Boulton after the disbandment of Tokyo Blade, following the commercial failure of Black Hearts & Jaded Spades and the disastrous tour of 1986. In fact, the band is indicated as 'Andy Boulton's Tokyo Blade' on the front cover of the European edition.

Ain't Misbehavin' was re-released in 1993 by Laserlight Records with the title Tokyo Blade, with different cover art and three bonus tracks, "1000 Years, "The Eye of the Storm", and "Chains of Love", which were also released in 1989 on the original pressing of No Remorse.

== Track listing ==
All tracks by Peter Zito and Andy Boulton, except "Heartbreaker" and "Too Much Too Soon" by Andy Boulton.

Side one

1. "Heartbreaker" – 4:34
2. "Too Much Too Soon" – 3:25
3. "Watch Your Step" – 3:38
4. "Movie Star" – 4:01

Side two

5. "Hot for Love" – 4:18
6. "Tokyo City" – 4:16
7. "Love and Hate" – 4:26
8. "Don't Walk Away" – 4:56
9. "Ain't Misbehavin'" – 1:38

== Personnel ==
=== Tokyo Blade ===
- Peter Zito – vocals
- Andy Boulton – guitar, backing vocals
- Chris Stover – bass
- Alex Lee – drums, backing vocals

=== Production ===
- Tom Krüger – producer, engineer, mixing
