= Chester County Training School =

High school in Tennessee, United States

Coordinates: 35.4474°N 88.6298°W

Chester County Training School, the first high school for African American students (since 1870, the Tennessee State Constitution had prohibited racially mixed public schools) in Chester County, Tennessee, opened in 1932. J. A. Vincent served as it first principal. This school was located on U.S. Highway 45 North in Henderson, Tennessee. The first graduating class (1936) consisted of seven members.

In 1963, the school's name was changed to Vincent High after J. A. Vincent. In 1969, it was merged with Chester County High School as a result of desegregation.

== Notable people ==
- Walton Bryan Stewart, who was a principal at CCTS after J. A. Vincent, later moved to Milwaukee, Wisconsin, where he became a labor activist, state legislator, and teacher of mathematics.
