= Blue Tears =

American hard rock band

- Origin: Henderson, Tennessee , United States
- Genres: Hard rock Glam metal
- Years active: 1983–1993; 2005–2009
- Labels: MCA, Suncity, AOR Heaven
- Past members: Gregg Fulkerson; Michael Spears; Charlie Lauderdale; Bryan Hall; Phil Jones; Larry Gilbow; Paul Reeves; Roger LaPointe; Bryan Wolski; Robert Streets

Blue Tears CD

Blue Tears was an American hard rock band from Henderson, Tennessee, United States, that enjoyed some short-lived fame in the late-1980s. However, the group failed to find significant commercial success, due to the wave of alternative/grunge music, and the group disbanded in 1993 as the members became involved in other projects. The band reformed in 2006 and released a new album. The band was permanently dissolved after lead singer Gregg Fulkerson died on April 14, 2009.

== History ==
The first iteration of what would become Blue Tears began in the fall of 1982, when Gregg Fulkerson (lead guitar), was a senior at Chester County High School and Mike Spears (bass), Bryan Hall (rhythm guitar) and Phil Johns were students at Freed Hardeman University. The band was originally called Misfit. Through the next several years the band had a couple of name changes (NonStop, Sahara) and several vocalists and drummers came and went.

The band made several recordings in Gregg's basement, but the first official recording was of their song "Stay With Me" which was recorded at the Castle Recording Studio in Nashville, TN. "Stay With Me" received much regional radio station airplay, and peaked at #2 on 92.3 FM Jackson, TN. The combination of radio airplay, devoted fans and multiple sold-out concerts at the Paramount and Malco theaters caught the attention of record industry professionals. One of these recordings landed on the desk of a Los Angeles-based record company. They signed a recording contract with MCA Records soon after. The band also changed their name to Blue Tears just two months prior to releasing their debut album.

Blue Tears was made up of founding members Gregg Fulkerson, Mike Spears and Bryan Hall. They were re-joined by Charlie Lauderdale on drums.

The debut album was released in June 1990 with lead single "Rockin' With the Radio" getting a music video. A second single, "Innocent Kiss" also received heavy promotion. The album was originally titled "Thunder in the Night" and was promoted as such but was eventually changed to a self-titled release. Unfortunately, the band was dismissed as just another glam metal act in that genres fading wave.

Blue Tears entered the studio in 1991 and banged out new tracks for a second album. The tracks included "Long Way Home", "Kisses In the Dark", "With You Tonight", "Follow Your Heart", and "Summer Girl". However, due to the popularity of the grunge genre and MTV's revamp, MCA decided to not release the follow-up album. But the never released tracks would eventually be released, along with some of Fulkerson's solo cuts, almost 15 years later.

The band members got involved in other projects. Most notably, Fulkerson and Spears worked with Stryper frontman in his first official solo album released in 1994.

By 2002, Fulkerson and Spears were again involved in another project called Attraction 65. At that time, there was already some sort of cult following of Blue Tears. Fulkerson decided to release a compilation of unreleased songs titled Mad, Bad and Dangerous and another called Dancin' On the Back Streets. Both of these were released on Sun City Records.

However, in 2006, Blue Tears (only with Fulkerson, from the original band) resurfaced releasing an album titled The Innocent Ones on AOR Heaven.

It was posted on country singer Jessica Miller's Myspace page that lead singer Gregg Fulkerson had died on April 14, 2009, morning, aged 44. He was the only constant member in the band and the one who kept it together, and the band was put to rest

== Band members ==
=== Final line-up ===
- Gregg Fulkerson - vocals, guitar, keyboards (1982–1993, 2005–2009)
- Bryan Wolski - bass, backing vocals (2005–2009)
- Robert Streets - drums, percussion (2006–2009)

=== Former members ===
- Michael "Mike" Spears - bass, backing vocals (1982-1993)
- Bryan Hall - guitar, backing vocals (1982–1993)
- Charlie Lauderdale - drums, percussion (1984–1993)
- Phil Jones- drums, singer worker(1982–1984)
- Vicki Buckley - vocals (1982–1983)
- Pam Gleaton - vocals (1983-1984)
- Roger LaPointe - vocals (1983-1986)
- Paul Reeves - drums, backing vocals (1983-1984)
- Aaron Sain - guitar (1984)
- Larry Gilbow - drums, percussion (1988-1992)

== Discography ==
=== Studio albums ===
- Blue Tears (1990)
- The Innocent Ones (2006)

=== Compilation albums ===
- Mad, Bad and Dangerous (2005)
- Dancin' On the Back Streets (2005)

=== Live albums ===
- Live In The UK (2026)
