= Sweet Lips, Tennessee =

- unincorporated community
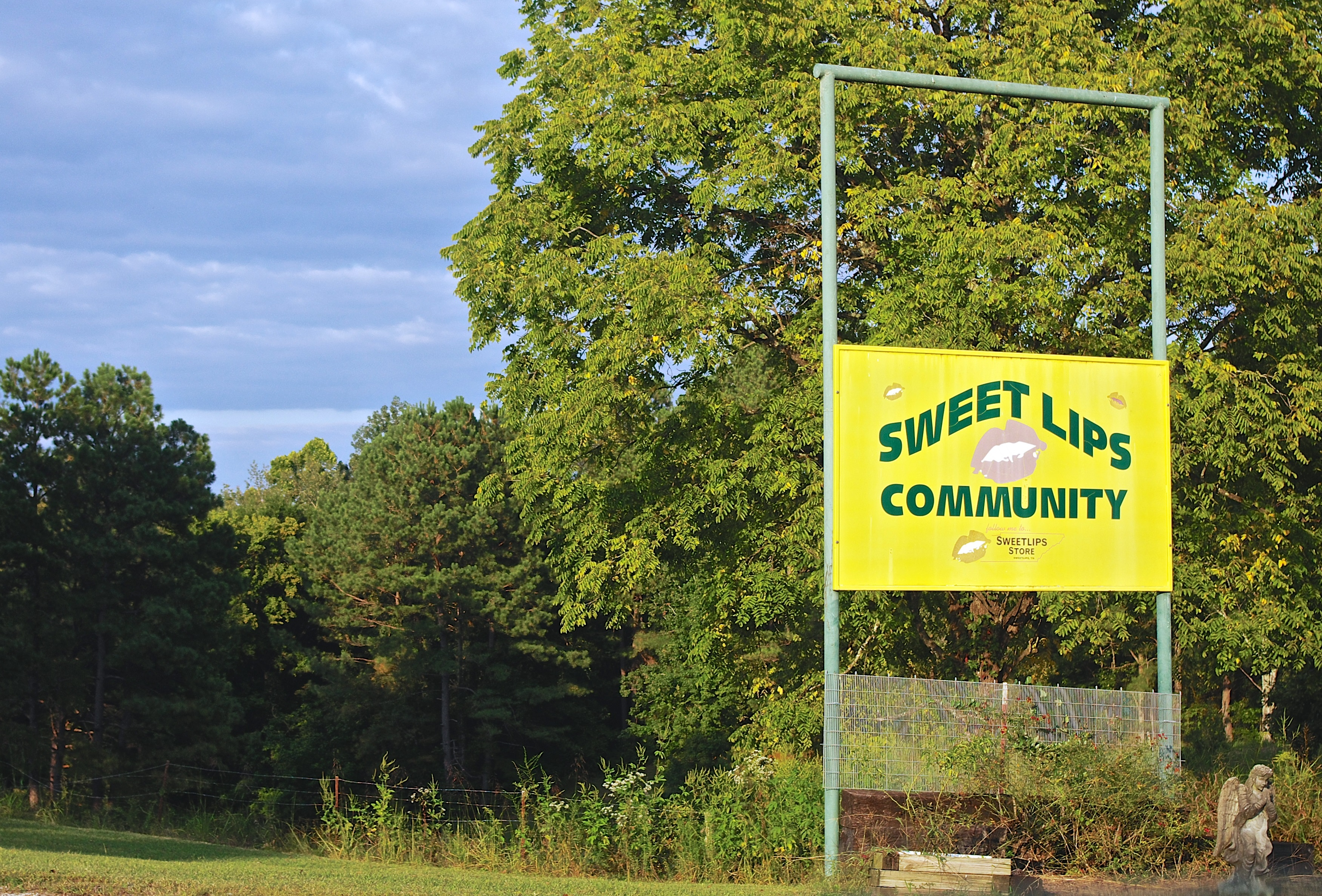
- Sweet Lips

- Location within Tennessee Location within the United States
- Coordinates: 35°24′30″N 88°31′20″W
- Country: United States
- State: Tennessee
- County: Chester
- Elevation: 584 ft (178 m)
- Time zone: UTC-6 (Central (CST))
  - Summer (DST): UTC-5 (CDT)
- GNIS feature ID: 1303968

Sweet Lips (or "Sweetlips") is an unincorporated community in Chester County, Tennessee, United States.

== History ==
The first settlers arrived in the 1820s. Residents have claimed that the name comes from "settlers (or wandering hobos or thirsty Civil War soldiers, depending on whom you ask) who declared water from a creek to be 'sweet to the lips.'" Alternatively, It may be named after Sweet Lips, the gun that a Tennessean soldier used to kill Patrick Ferguson who was leading an army of Loyalists to invade Tennessee on October 7, 1780. It may also be named after George Washington's dog with the same name. Sweet Lips has frequently been noted on lists of unusual place names.

A 1986 profile on the community reported a population of 85, no stop signs or street lights, no post office, and that the former two-room school house was now the "Sweet Lips Grocery" store. The school closed in 1960.

Some scenes from the 1973 movie Walking Tall were filmed in Sweet Lips.
