= Children of Madness =

Children Of Madness

Studio album by Paul Di'Anno's Battlezone
- Released: August 1987
- Recorded: Village Recorders, Dagenham, East London, UK
- Genre: Heavy metal
- Length: 40:07
- Label: Powerstation Records (UK); Shatter Records (US)
- Producer: Ian Richardson

Paul Di'Anno's Battlezone chronology
Fighting back (1986)	Children Of Madness (1987)	Warchild (1988)

Children of Madness is the second album by Paul Di'Anno's Battlezone. It was released in August 1987.

== Track listing ==
All songs by Graham Bath, Paul Di'Anno, and Steve Hopgood except "To The Limit" by Paul Di'Anno.

=== Side One ===
1. "Rip It Up" - 2:44
2. "Overloaded" - 3:16
3. "Nuclear Breakdown" - 4:48
4. "Torch of Hate" - 2:58
5. "Children of Madness" - 5:17

=== Side Two ===
1. "I Don't Wanna Know" - 3:18
2. "The Promise" - 3:36
3. "It's Love" - 3:35
4. "Metal Tears" - 5:57
5. "Whispered Rage" - 4:38

=== Bonus Track (On 2016 Wasabi Records Remaster) ===
1. "To The Limit" - 3:54

== Personnel ==
=== Band members ===
- Paul Di'Anno - lead vocals
- Graham Bath - guitar
- John Wiggins - guitar
- Pete West - bass
- Steve Hopgood - drums

=== Production ===
- Ian Richardson - producer, engineer
