= Neighbourhood Threat =

Studio album by Johnny Crash
- Released: 1990
- Recorded: 1989
- Genre: Hard rock
- Length: 40:14
- Label: WTG/Columbia
- Producer: Tony Platt

Johnny Crash chronology
Neighbourhood Threat (1990)	Unfinished Business (2008)

Neighbourhood Threat is the first album by American rock band Johnny Crash, released in 1990. It was recorded at Ocean Way Studios, Los Angeles, and mixed at Battery Studios, London. The album features guest appearances by Kingdom Come members Danny Stag and Johnny B. Frank.

After this album, August Worchell was replaced by J.J. Bolt and Stephen Adamo was replaced by Matt Sorum. Keyboardist Dizzy Reed also joined. All three played on the band's second album, Unfinished Business, which was released in 2008.

== Critical reception ==
Professional ratings
Review scores
Source	Rating
AllMusic	3/5 stars

The Kingston Whig-Standard noted that "their forte is the straightforward paint-blisterer, like 'Axe to the Wax'; they have an accomplished screecher in Mr. Wright, who never backs off... And together the band writes simple but melodic songs."

== Track listing ==
1. "Hey Kid" – 3:28
2. "No Bones About It" – 3:25
3. "All the Way in Love" – 3:36
4. "Thrill of the Kill" – 4:39
5. "Axe to the Wax" – 3:49
6. "Sink or Swim" – 3:28
7. "Crack of Dawn" – 4:08
8. "Freedom Road" – 3:02
9. "Halfway to Heaven" – 3:09
10. "Trigger Happy" – 4:03
11. "Baby's Like a Piano" – 3:32

=== Additional tracks ===
A track that did not make the final listing on the album was "Crusin' for a Bruisin", written by Worchell/Wright/Stewart, which was eventually released on a compilation album called Hammer Rocks (CBS Records 466897 2), which also included the track "Hey Kid". An accompanying video was also released which featured the promo for "Hey Kid".

== Personnel ==
- Vicki James Wright – lead vocals
- August Worchell – lead guitar, slide guitar, vocals
- Christopher Stewart – rhythm guitar, vocals
- Andy Rodgers – bass
- Stephen Adamo – drums
- Cover Artwork by Barry Jackson
