= Masseyville, Tennessee =

Unincorporated community in Tennessee, US

Coordinates: 35°17′38″N 88°42′21″W

Masseyville is an unincorporated community in Chester County, Tennessee.

== History ==
Masseyville is an unincorporated community located along Tennessee State Route 225 and was originally part of McNairy County, but became part of Chester County when that county was formed in 1882. It was named for an early settler, Bill Massey. The Masseyville Post Office was opened in 1884 and discontinued in 1915.

== Geography ==
The community is situated on Tennessee State Route 225.
