= Blue Tears (album) =

Studio album by Blue Tears
- Released: June 7, 1990
- Genre: Hard rock, glam metal
- Length: 44:05
- Label: MCA
- Producer: David Cole

Blue Tears chronology
Blue Tears (1990)	Mad, Bad and Dangerous (2005)

Professional ratings
Review scores
Source	Rating
AllMusic	2/5 stars

Blue Tears is the debut album of the band of the same name. The album was released in 1990 by MCA Records. It spawned several singles and videos like "Innocent Kiss" and "Rockin' with the Radio". "Rockin' with the Radio" peaked at #45 in "Aor Tracks" chart by Radio & Records and its video received medium airplay on MTV.

== Track listing ==
All songs written by Gregg Fulkerson, except where noted.

1. "Rockin' With the Radio" - 4:23
2. "Crush" (Fulkerson, Kevin Savigar) - 4:12
3. "Blue Tears" - 5:18
4. "Take This Heart" (Fulkerson, Ron Hutcheson) - 4:27
5. "Halfway to Heaven" - 3:56
6. "Innocent Kiss" - 3:23
7. "Racing With the Moon" - 3:29
8. "Kiss Me Goodbye" - 4:45
9. "True Romance" - 5:03
10. "Thunder in the Night" (Fulkerson, Savigar) - 5:01

== Personnel ==
- Gregg Fulkerson - vocals, guitar
- Charlie Lauderdale - drums
- Bryan Hall - guitar, vocals
- Michael Spears - bass
