= Face First (Masque album) =

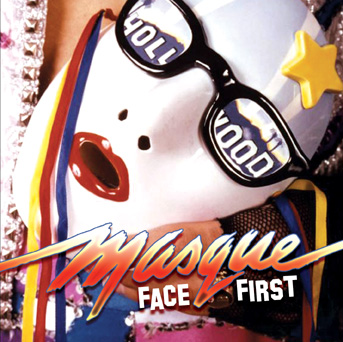

Studio album by Masque
- Released: June 2008
- Recorded: 1985–1988
- Genre: Glam metal
- Length: 35:04
- Label: Suncity
- Producers: Tony Kelly, Dale Fine, Kevin James, Mark Wolfson

Face First is a compilation of songs recorded by the rock band Masque between 1985 and 1988. The songs were officially recorded for two major record companies but wasn't released until 2008. All songs were recorded during the height of the band's popularity as a local Hollywood live act.

== Track listing ==
1. "Face First" - 2:38
2. "Sweet Revenge" - 3:38
3. "Wrap Your Arms Around Me" - 3:15
4. "Sweet Thing'" - 3:36
5. "Shame" - 3:02
6. "Walk Tight" - 3:46
7. "Lover Lover" - 3:44
8. "Boulevard of Broken Dreams" - 3:44
9. "Don't Take My Heart" - 3:51
10. "Reckless Actions" - 3:56
11. "Feelin Fine" - 2:34

== Credits ==
- Tony Kelly - vocals
- Dale Fine - guitar
- Bruff Brigham - bass
- Ross Cristao - drums
- Kevin James - guitar
- John Haro - drums
