= Montezuma, Tennessee =

Unincorporated community in Tennessee, US

Coordinates: 35°23′37″N 88°41′37″W

Montezuma is an unincorporated community in Chester County, Tennessee.

== History ==
The area now known as Montezuma was first settled in about 1820. Joseph Johnson, Wesley and Nehemiah Burkhead were among the first settlers. The first store in Montezuma was owned by J. R. Wamble. In the 1850s and 1860s when the railroad was being built in West Tennessee the people of Montezuma did not want it built through their community. The railroad was therefore routed through Henderson, which over time became the larger community. Montezuma was a part of McNairy County until Chester County was formed. Montezuma and Henderson were both proposed as the County Seat for the newly formed Chester County, but Henderson won by a large margin. In July 1975 the Montezuma Post Office was discontinued and consolidated with the Post Office in Henderson.

== Geography ==
The community is situated on Tennessee State Route 225.
