= Pumphouse (album) =

Studio album by Tokyo Blade
- Released: 1998
- Recorded: 1993–1994
- Studio: Stable Studios, Aldbourne, UK
- Genre: Heavy metal
- Length: 47:34
- Label: Zoom Club
- Producer: Nick Beere and Pumphouse

Tokyo Blade chronology
Burning Down Paradise (1995)	Pumphouse (1998)	Mr. Ice (1998)

Pumphouse is the seventh full-length studio album released under the name of the British heavy metal band Tokyo Blade. The album was actually recorded by the band Pumphouse, which was the outfit founded in the early 90s by Alan Marsh, Tokyo Blade original vocalist, after his band Mr. Ice had folded. The British label Zoom Club released the collection of songs in 1998 under the name Tokyo Blade, after the members of Pumphouse Marsh, Riggs and Angel had joined Andy Boulton and John Wiggins to record Burning Down Paradise in 1994 and to tour in Europe as Tokyo Blade.

== Track listing ==
1. "Like You Not-Not" – 4:29
2. "The Ultimate High" – 5:42
3. "Gerald's Game" – 5:10
4. "Pay the Man" – 3:37
5. "Wrong Chair" – 4:48
6. "It's Only Money" – 3:59
7. "Character Assassination" – 4:49
8. "S.O.S." – 4:08
9. "All Work No Play" – 3:41
10. "SNAFU" – 3:34
11. "Having a Bad Day" – 3:37

== Personnel ==
=== Pumphouse ===
- Alan Marsh – vocals
- Jez Lee – guitar
- Ian "Attila" Marshall – keyboards
- Colin Riggs – bass
- Marc Angel – drums
