= Chester County Courthouse (Tennessee) =

- U.S. National Register of Historic Places
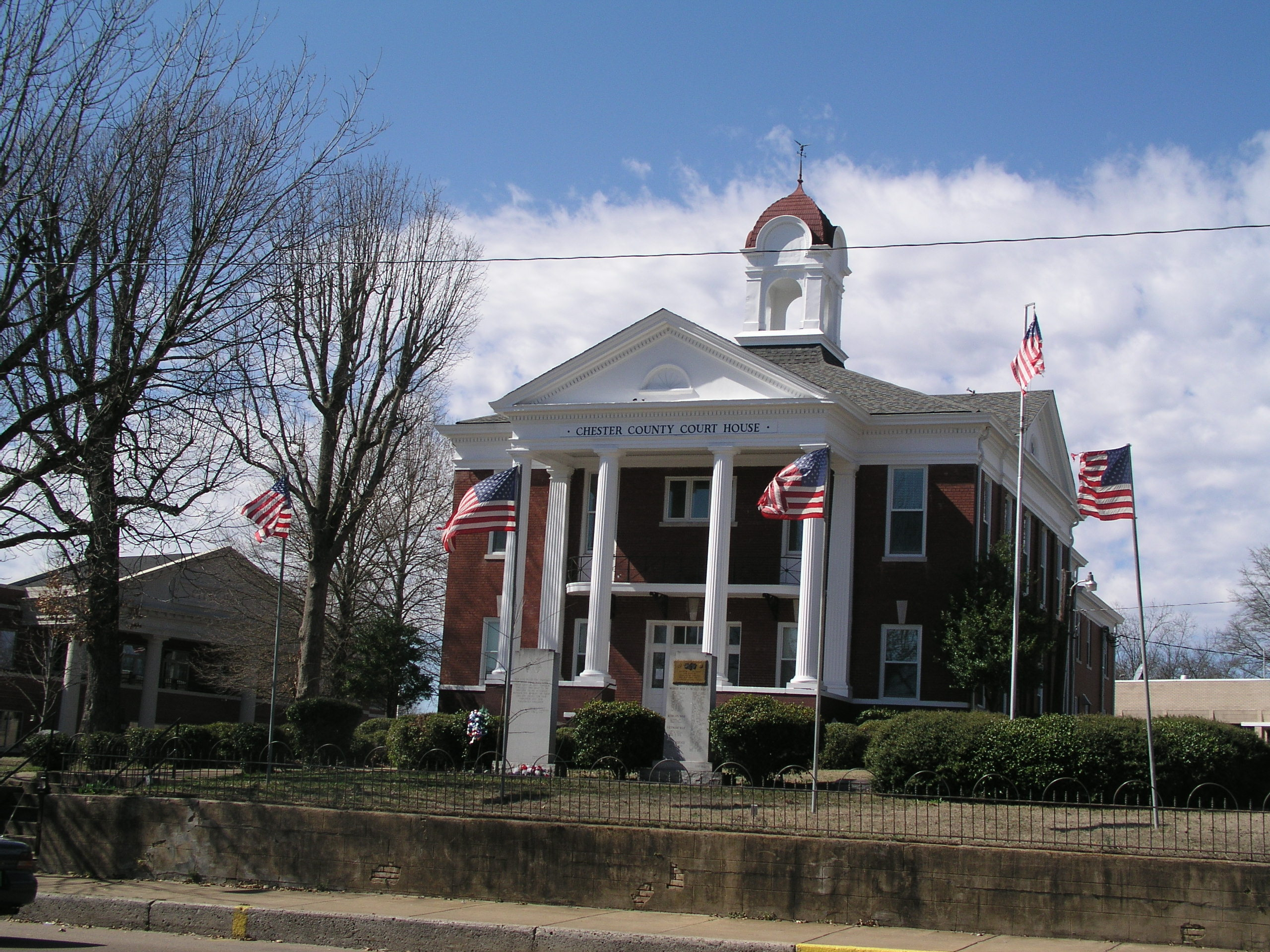
- Chester County Courthouse in 2003

- Location within Tennessee Location within the United States
- Interactive map showing the location of Chester County Courthouse
- Location: 133 East Main Street, Court Sq., Henderson, Tennessee
- Coordinates: 35°26′24″N 88°38′27″W
- Area: 1.6 acres (0.65 ha)
- Built: 1913
- Architectural style: Classical Revival
- NRHP reference No.: 79002418
- Added to NRHP: March 26, 1979

The Chester County Courthouse is an historic county courthouse building located at 133 East Main Street, Court Square in Henderson, Chester County, Tennessee. Built in 1913 in the Classical Revival style of architecture. it is the third courthouse that Chester County has had, the previous ones having burned down. It is a two-story redbrick structure with a colonnaded front portico and a cupola in the center of its gabled roof. The original building has been added onto with an architecturally complementary extension on the rear. In 1973, it was featured in the movie Walking Tall, based on the life of McNairy County sheriff Buford Pusser. On March 26, 1979, it was added to the National Register of Historic Places.
