= Edward Schaumberg Quade =

American mathematician

- Born: June 28, 1908
- Died: June 4, 1988 (aged 79)
- Occupation: Mathematician
- Employer: RAND Corporation
- Known for: Trigonometric series; systems analysis

Edward Schaumberg Quade (June 28, 1908 – June 4, 1988) was an American mathematician at the Rand Corporation who worked on trigonometric series and systems analysis.
