= Fighting Back (Battlezone album) =

Studio album by Paul Di'Anno's Battlezone
- Released: 1986
- Recorded: Village Recorders, Dagenham, East London, UK
- Genre: Heavy metal
- Length: 40:34
- Label: Raw Power Records (UK); Shatter Records (US)
- Producer: Battlezone and Ian Richardson

Paul Di'Anno's Battlezone chronology
Fighting Back (1986)	Children of Madness (1987)

Professional ratings
Review scores
Source	Rating
AllMusic	2.5/5 stars

Fighting Back is the debut studio album by the British heavy metal band Battlezone, a band that was formed by original ex-Iron Maiden vocalist Paul Di'Anno.

== Track listing ==
All songs by John Hurley, except "(Forever) Fighting Back" by Bob Falck. Lyrics by Paul Di'Anno.

=== Side One ===
1. "(Forever) Fighting Back" - 2:20
2. "Welcome To The Battlezone" - 3:26
3. "Warchild" - 2:51
4. "In The Darkness" - 4:12
5. "The Land God Gave To Caine" - 7:19

=== Side Two ===
1. "Running Blind" - 4:46
2. "Too Much To Heart" - 4:45
3. "Voice on the Radio" - 3:09
4. "Welfare Warriors" - 4:39
5. "Feel The Rock" - 3:07

== Personnel ==
=== Band members ===
- Paul Di'Anno - lead vocals
- John Hurley - guitar, backing vocals
- John Wiggins - guitar, backing vocals
- Pete West - bass
- Bob Falck - drums, backing vocals

=== Additional musicians ===
- Dave Montgomery - backing vocals

=== Production ===
- Ian Richardson - producer, engineer
