= Chester County, Tennessee =

County in Tennessee, United States

- County
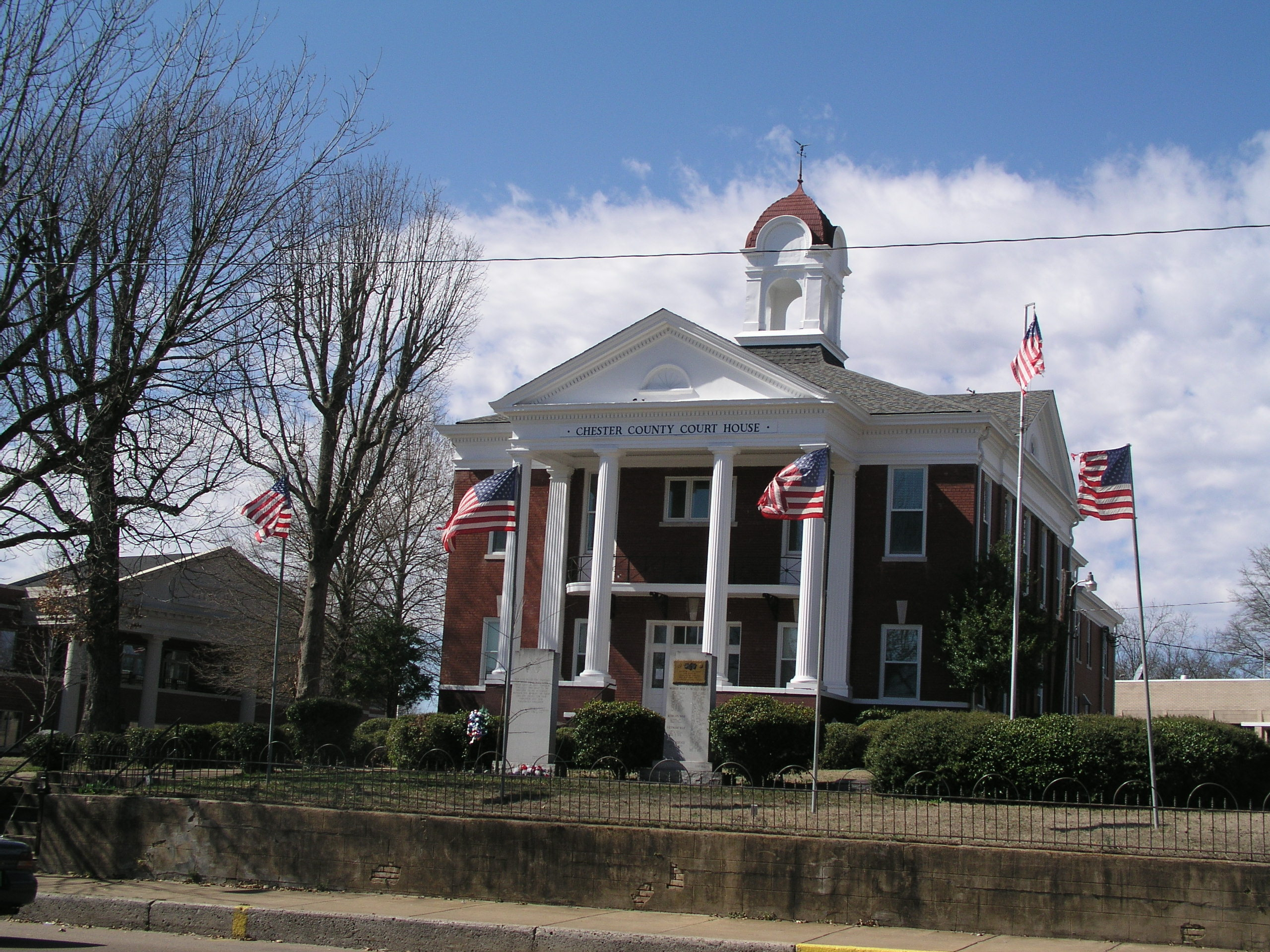
- Chester County Courthouse in Henderson, 2003

- Location within the U.S. state of Tennessee
- Coordinates: 35°26′N 88°37′W
- Country: United States
- State: Tennessee
- Founded: 1882
- Named for: Robert Chester
- Seat: Henderson
- Largest city: Henderson

Area
  - Total: 286 sq mi (740 km^{2})
  - Land: 286 sq mi (740 km^{2})
  - Water: 0.2 sq mi (0.52 km^{2}) 0.08%

Population (2020)
  - Total: 17,341
  - Estimate (2025): 17,994 ▲
  - Density: 60/sq mi (23/km^{2})
- Time zone: UTC−6 (Central)
  - Summer (DST): UTC−5 (CDT)
- Congressional district: 8th
- Website: chestercountytn.org

Chester County is a county located in the U.S. state of Tennessee. As of the 2020 census, the population was 17,341. Its county seat is Henderson. The county was created in 1879 and organized in 1882. Chester County is included in the Jackson, Tennessee metropolitan area.

== History ==
Chester County was the last county formed in Tennessee, created by the General Assembly in 1875 from adjacent parts of neighboring Hardeman, Henderson, McNairy, and Madison counties. This land was used to create a county named Wisdom County, but "Wisdom County" was never organized, and in March 1879 the Assembly repealed this and created Chester County out of the same land. Lawsuits by opponents of the creation of the new county delayed actual organization until 1882. Chester County was named for Colonel Robert I. Chester, a quartermaster in the War of 1812, an early postmaster in Jackson, and a federal marshal.

== Geography ==
According to the U.S. Census Bureau, the county has a total area of 286 square miles (740 km^{2}), of which 286 square miles (740 km^{2}) is land and 0.2 square miles (0.52 km^{2}) (0.08%) is water.

=== Adjacent counties ===
- Henderson County (northeast)
- Hardin County (southeast)
- McNairy County (south)
- Hardeman County (southwest)
- Madison County (northwest)

=== State protected areas ===
- Chickasaw State Park
- Chickasaw State Forest (part)

== Demographics ==
Historical population
Census	Pop.	Note	%±
1890	9,069		—
1900	9,869		8.8%
1910	9,090		−7.9%
1920	9,669		6.4%
1930	10,603		9.7%
1940	11,124		4.9%
1950	11,149		0.2%
1960	9,569		−14.2%
1970	9,927		3.7%
1980	12,727		28.2%
1990	12,819		0.7%
2000	15,540		21.2%
2010	17,131		10.2%
2020	17,341		1.2%
2025 (est.)	17,994	▲	3.8%
U.S. Decennial Census; 1790-1960 1900-1990; 1990-2000 2010-2014

=== 2020 census ===
Chester County racial composition
Race	Perc.
White	84.3%
Black or African American	8.6%
American Indian and Alaska Native	0.3%
Asian	0.4%
Native Hawaiian and Pacific Islander	<0.1%
Some other race	1.5%
Two or more races	4.8%
Hispanic or Latino	3.0%

As of the 2020 census, there were 17,341 people, 6,503 households, and 4,471 families residing in the county.

The median age was 38.8 years, with 22.2% of residents under the age of 18 and 17.9% of residents 65 years of age or older. For every 100 females there were 94.6 males, and for every 100 females age 18 and over there were 92.5 males.

34.1% of residents lived in urban areas, while 65.9% lived in rural areas.

There were 6,503 households in the county, of which 30.9% had children under the age of 18 living in them. Of all households, 50.6% were married-couple households, 17.4% were households with a male householder and no spouse or partner present, and 26.4% were households with a female householder and no spouse or partner present. About 26.1% of all households were made up of individuals, and 12.0% had someone living alone who was 65 years of age or older.

There were 7,212 housing units, of which 9.8% were vacant. Among occupied housing units, 73.2% were owner-occupied and 26.8% were renter-occupied. The homeowner vacancy rate was 1.2% and the rental vacancy rate was 6.8%.

The county's racial composition from the 2020 census redistricting data is shown below.

=== 2000 census ===
As of the census of 2000, there were 15,540 people, 5,660 households, and 4,199 families residing in the county. The population density was 54 people per square mile (21 people/km^{2}). There were 6,178 housing units at an average density of 21 units per square mile (8.1/km^{2}). The racial makeup of the county was 88.13% White (non-Hispanic), 10.03% Black or African American, 0.23% Native American, 0.23% Asian, 0.31% from other races, and 1.07% from two or more races. 0.97% of the population were Hispanic or Latino of any race.

As of 2000 there were 5,660 households, out of which 33.60% had children under the age of 18 living with them, 59.00% were married couples living together, 11.50% had a female householder with no husband present, and 25.80% were non-families. 22.60% of all households were made up of individuals, and 10.80% had someone living alone who was 65 years of age or older. The average household size was 2.55 and the average family size was 2.97.

In the county, the population was spread out, with 24.20% under the age of 18, 14.40% from 18 to 24, 26.40% from 25 to 44, 21.40% from 45 to 64, and 13.60% who were 65 years of age or older. The median age was 34 years. For every 100 females, there were 94.50 males. For every 100 females age 18 and over, there were 90.20 males.

The median income for a household in the county was $34,349, and the median income for a family was $41,127. Males had a median income of $31,378 versus $21,615 for females. The per capita income for the county was $15,756. About 11.10% of families and 14.40% of the population were below the poverty line, including 18.50% of those under age 18 and 15.30% of those age 65 or over.

== Education ==
There are six schools in the Chester County School District. Chester County High School serves the whole county and holds grades 9–12. Chester County Junior High School holds grades 6 through 8 for the entire county. Chester County Middle School serves the whole county's students in grades 4 and 5. East Chester County Elementary School, West Chester County Elementary School, and Jacks Creek Elementary School all hold kindergarten through 3rd grade.

Henderson is the home of Freed–Hardeman University.

== Communities ==
=== City ===
- Henderson (County Seat)

=== Town ===
- Enville (partial)
- Milledgeville (partial)
- Silerton (partial)
- Finger (partial)

=== Census-designated place ===
- Jacks Creek

=== Unincorporated communities ===
- Deanburg
- Hickory Corners
- Masseyville
- Mifflin
- Montezuma
- Sweet Lips
- Woodville

== In popular culture ==
- Country musician Eddy Arnold, a native of Henderson, titled his 1969 autobiography It's A Long Way From Chester County.
- The 1973 movie Walking Tall was filmed in Henderson and elsewhere in Chester County, including important scenes filmed in the county courthouse; many local residents served as extras or played bit parts.

== Politics ==
Chester County is a Republican stronghold. The last Democrat to carry the county was Jimmy Carter in 1976.

United States presidential election results for Chester County, Tennessee
Year	Republican		Democratic		Third party(ies)	
Year	No.	%	No.	%	No.	%
1912	312	22.71%	636	46.29%	426	31.00%
1916	645	41.64%	862	55.65%	42	2.71%
1920	1,088	48.81%	1,105	49.57%	36	1.62%
1924	484	38.47%	758	60.25%	16	1.27%
1928	582	44.19%	735	55.81%	0	0.00%
1932	356	26.23%	985	72.59%	16	1.18%
1936	565	32.40%	1,172	67.20%	7	0.40%
1940	1,015	39.77%	1,537	60.23%	0	0.00%
1944	931	44.52%	1,156	55.28%	4	0.19%
1948	766	39.48%	980	50.52%	194	10.00%
1952	1,674	53.01%	1,484	46.99%	0	0.00%
1956	1,460	48.85%	1,495	50.02%	34	1.14%
1960	1,807	59.05%	1,192	38.95%	61	1.99%
1964	1,767	50.06%	1,763	49.94%	0	0.00%
1968	1,408	32.79%	849	19.77%	2,037	47.44%
1972	2,787	71.70%	961	24.72%	139	3.58%
1976	1,949	43.15%	2,532	56.05%	36	0.80%
1980	2,751	55.69%	2,123	42.98%	66	1.34%
1984	2,793	59.68%	1,854	39.62%	33	0.71%
1988	2,781	61.05%	1,757	38.57%	17	0.37%
1992	2,834	50.64%	2,317	41.40%	445	7.95%
1996	2,746	56.03%	1,922	39.22%	233	4.75%
2000	3,487	60.88%	2,192	38.27%	49	0.86%
2004	4,086	64.28%	2,242	35.27%	29	0.46%
2008	4,587	71.02%	1,797	27.82%	75	1.16%
2012	4,684	73.07%	1,624	25.34%	102	1.59%
2016	5,081	78.09%	1,243	19.10%	183	2.81%
2020	5,952	78.48%	1,412	18.62%	220	2.90%
2024	6,206	81.91%	1,286	16.97%	85	1.12%

== See also ==
- National Register of Historic Places listings in Chester County, Tennessee
