= Tokyo Blade (album) =

- Original album cover

Studio album by Tokyo Blade
- Released: 1983
- Recorded: 1983
- Studio: Wickham Studios, Rooster Studios, Cave Studios, Bristol, UK
- Genre: Heavy metal
- Length: 43:52
- Label: Powerstation Records
- Producer: Kevin D. Nixon, Andy Allen

Tokyo Blade chronology
Tokyo Blade (1983)	Midnight Rendezvous (1984)

Singles from Tokyo Blade
- 1. "Powergame" / "Death on Main Street" Released: 1983; 2. "If Heaven Is Hell" / "Highway Passion" Released: 1983

Professional ratings
Review scores
Source	Rating
AllMusic	4.5/5 stars
Collector's Guide to Heavy Metal	7/10
Metal Forces	9/10

Tokyo Blade is the debut album by English heavy metal band Tokyo Blade. It was originally released in 1983 and reissued by High Vaultage Records in a remastered edition on CD in 1997, including all the 4 tracks from the 1984 Midnight Rendezvous EP, which actually were recorded in early 1983 while the band was called Genghis Khan plus "Death on Main Street" which was originally the b-side on "Powergame" 7" and recorded at the same sessions as the album.

== Track listings ==
Side one

1. "Powergame" (Andy Boulton, Al Marsh) – 4:12
2. "Break the Chains" (Boulton, Marsh, John Wiggins) – 5:07
3. "If Heaven Is Hell" (Boulton, Marsh) – 6:04
4. "On Through the Night" (Boulton, Marsh) – 7:29

Side two

5. "Killer City" (Boulton, Marsh) – 5:47
6. "Liar" (Boulton, Marsh) – 5:37
7. "Tonight" (Russ Ballard) – 4:02
8. "Sunrise in Tokyo" (Boulton, Marsh) – 5:47
9. "Blue Ridge Mountains of Virginia" – 1:13

=== 1997 remastered edition ===
1. "Powergame" – 4:12
2. "Break the Chains" – 5:07
3. "If Heaven Is Hell" – 6:04
4. "On Through the Night" – 7:29
5. "Killer City" – 5:47
6. "Liar" – 5:37
7. "Tonight" – 4:02
8. "Sunrise in Tokyo" – 5:47
9. "Blue Ridge Mountains of Virginia" – 1:13
10. "If Heaven Is Hell" – 6:00
11. "Highway Passion" – 4:24
12. "Midnight Rendezvous" – 3:22
13. "Mean Streak" – 4:44
14. "Death on Main Street" – 4:38

== Personnel ==
=== Tokyo Blade ===
- Alan Marsh – lead vocals
- Andy Boulton – guitar
- John Wiggins – guitar (except tracks 3, 10–13)
- Andy Robbins – bass guitar
- Steve Pierce – drums

=== Additional musicians ===
- Ray Dismore – guitar on tracks 3,10-13.

=== Production ===
- Kevin D. Nixon – producer
- Ralph Jezzard – engineer
- Tony Spath – mixing
- Andy Allen – producer, engineer and mixing of tracks 3, 10–13.
