= Suncity Records =

Suncity Records is an Australian record label that specialized in releasing melodic rock and hard rock CDs. The label mostly focused on previously recorded, but unreleased, material. Suncity Records went out of business (off-line) in late 2010.

== Artists ==
- Androids
- Big Guns
- Blackboard Jungle
- Blue Tears
- Cruella D'ville
- Dirty Rhythm
- Fashion Police
- Fatal Charm
- Femme Fatale
- Flash Addict
- Jet Red
- Johnny Crash
- Kidd Havok
- Lessdress
- Daniel MacMaster (of Bonham)
- Masque
- Pretty Vacant
- Quade
- Road Ratt
- Schoolboy Crush
- Slash Puppet
- Sweet Teaze
- Swingin' Thing
- Voyeur

== See also ==
- Lists of record labels
