= Henderson, Tennessee =

- City
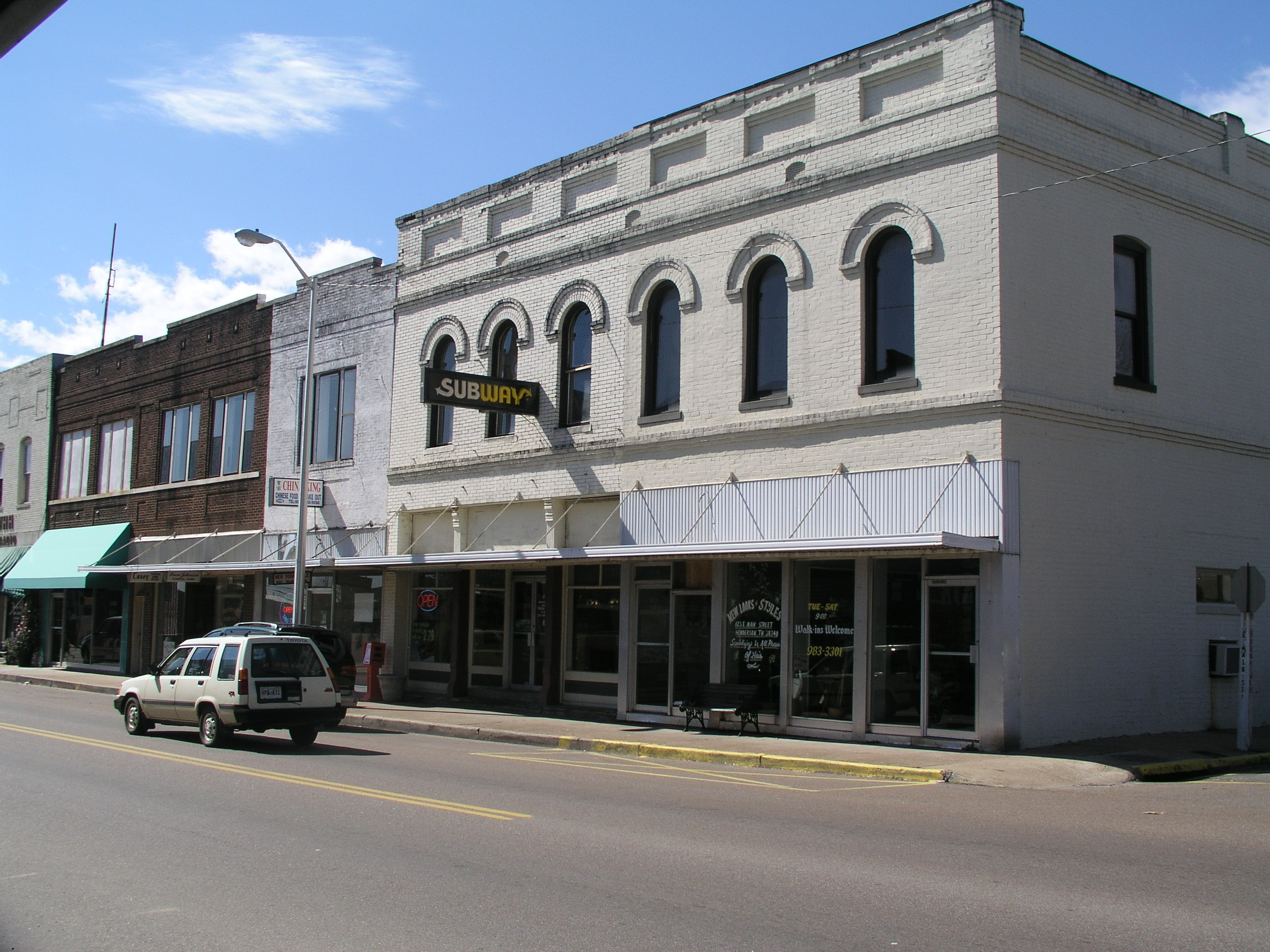
- Shops in Henderson

- Location of Henderson in Chester County, Tennessee.
- Coordinates: 35°26′35″N 88°38′40″W
- Country: United States
- State: Tennessee
- County: Chester

Government
  - Mayor: Terry Bell

Area
  - Total: 7.83 sq mi (20.29 km^{2})
  - Land: 7.81 sq mi (20.22 km^{2})
  - Water: 0.027 sq mi (0.07 km^{2})
- Elevation: 446 ft (136 m)

Population (2020)
  - Total: 6,308
  - Density: 808.2/sq mi (312.04/km^{2})
- Time zone: UTC-6 (Central (CST))
  - Summer (DST): UTC-5 (CDT)
- ZIP code: 38340
- Area code: 731
- FIPS code: 47-33260
- GNIS feature ID: 1287374
- Website: www.hendersontn.gov

Henderson is a city in and the county seat of Chester County, Tennessee, United States. As of the 2020 census, Henderson had a population of 6,308.

== History ==
Henderson was platted in 1857, when the railroad was extended to that point. The city takes its name from Henderson County, Tennessee. Henderson was called Dayton until the Civil War, when it then became known as Henderson Station and, finally, Henderson.

== Geography ==
Henderson is located near the center of Chester County at 35°26′35″N 88°38′40″W (35.443025, -88.644345), to the west of the South Fork Forked Deer River. U.S. Route 45 passes through the city, leading northwest 17 miles (27 km) to Jackson and south 20 miles (32 km) to Selmer. Tennessee State Route 100 passes south of the city center, leading east 32 miles (51 km) to Decaturville and west 30 miles (48 km) to Whiteville.

According to the United States Census Bureau, the city has a total area of 7.9 square miles (20.4 km^{2}), of which 0.03 square miles (0.07 km^{2}), or 0.35%, is water.

== Arts, culture and outdoors ==
For several years, the Henderson Arts Commission has sponsored many arts-related events and programs, like the Summer Camp Theatre Experience.

The city park is called Gene Record Park. It features playground equipment, a walking trail, soccer fields, a permanent space for the local Farmer's Market, picnic tables, a dog park, and a 9-hole disc golf course. In January 2020, the city paper (Chester County Independent) reported that a Splash Pad would soon be installed at the park.

Since 1978, Henderson has also been the site of the Chester County Barbecue Festival, a regional event that celebrates the barbecue tradition of the area. The first pitmaster for the Chester County Barbecue Festival was Bill Howard, a pitmaster from Jacks Creek, Tennessee who was known throughout Chester County as "The Barbecue King". Howard was chosen by the Smithsonian Folklife Festival to represent Afro-American barbecue and was invited to serve barbecue in Washington, DC in 1986.

== Newspaper ==
The local paper, the Chester County Independent, is based in Henderson.

== Demographics ==
Historical population
Census	Pop.	Note	%±
1880	493		—
1890	1,069		116.8%
1910	1,087		—
1920	1,181		8.6%
1930	1,503		27.3%
1940	1,771		17.8%
1950	2,532		43.0%
1960	2,691		6.3%
1970	3,581		33.1%
1980	4,449		24.2%
1990	4,760		7.0%
2000	5,670		19.1%
2010	6,309		11.3%
2020	6,308		0.0%

=== 2020 census ===
As of the 2020 census, Henderson had a population of 6,308 and 1,261 families. The median age was 28.3 years, 21.6% of residents were under the age of 18, and 14.9% of residents were 65 years of age or older. For every 100 females there were 87.7 males, and for every 100 females age 18 and over there were 85.8 males.

There were 2,070 households in Henderson, of which 34.3% had children under the age of 18 living in them. Of all households, 39.2% were married-couple households, 17.7% were households with a male householder and no spouse or partner present, and 37.4% were households with a female householder and no spouse or partner present. About 31.2% of all households were made up of individuals and 15.2% had someone living alone who was 65 years of age or older.

There were 2,270 housing units, of which 8.8% were vacant. The homeowner vacancy rate was 2.0% and the rental vacancy rate was 6.8%.

93.5% of residents lived in urban areas, while 6.5% lived in rural areas.

Racial composition as of the 2020 census
Race	Number	Percent
White	4,736	75.1%
Black or African American	1,055	16.7%
American Indian and Alaska Native	25	0.4%
Asian	44	0.7%
Native Hawaiian and Other Pacific Islander	0	0.0%
Some other race	109	1.7%
Two or more races	339	5.4%
Hispanic or Latino (of any race)	223	3.5%

=== 2000 census ===
As of the census of 2000, there was a population of 5,670, with 1,896 households and 1,270 families residing in the city. The population density was 991.6 inhabitants per square mile (382.9/km^{2}). There were 2,072 housing units at an average density of 362.4 per square mile (139.9/km^{2}). The racial makeup of the city was 80.09% White, 17.87% African American, 0.09% Native American, 0.41% Asian, 0.37% from other races, and 1.18% from two or more races. Hispanic or Latino of any race were 1.52% of the population.

There were 1,896 households, out of which 31.8% had children under the age of 18 living with them, 47.0% were married couples living together, 16.6% had a female householder with no husband present, and 33.0% were non-families. 28.7% of all households were made up of individuals, and 14.3% had someone living alone who was 65 years of age or older. The average household size was 2.41 and the average family size was 2.96.

In the city, the population was spread out, with 21.5% under the age of 18, 25.2% from 18 to 24, 22.5% from 25 to 44, 16.0% from 45 to 64, and 14.8% who were 65 years of age or older. The median age was 27 years. For every 100 females, there were 85.4 males. For every 100 females age 18 and over, there were 80.0 males.

The median income for a household in the city was $32,648, and the median income for a family was $40,907. Males had a median income of $32,215 versus $22,258 for females. The per capita income for the city was $16,735. About 15.4% of families and 19.0% of the population were below the poverty line, including 27.6% of those under age 18 and 20.1% of those age 65 or over.

== Education ==
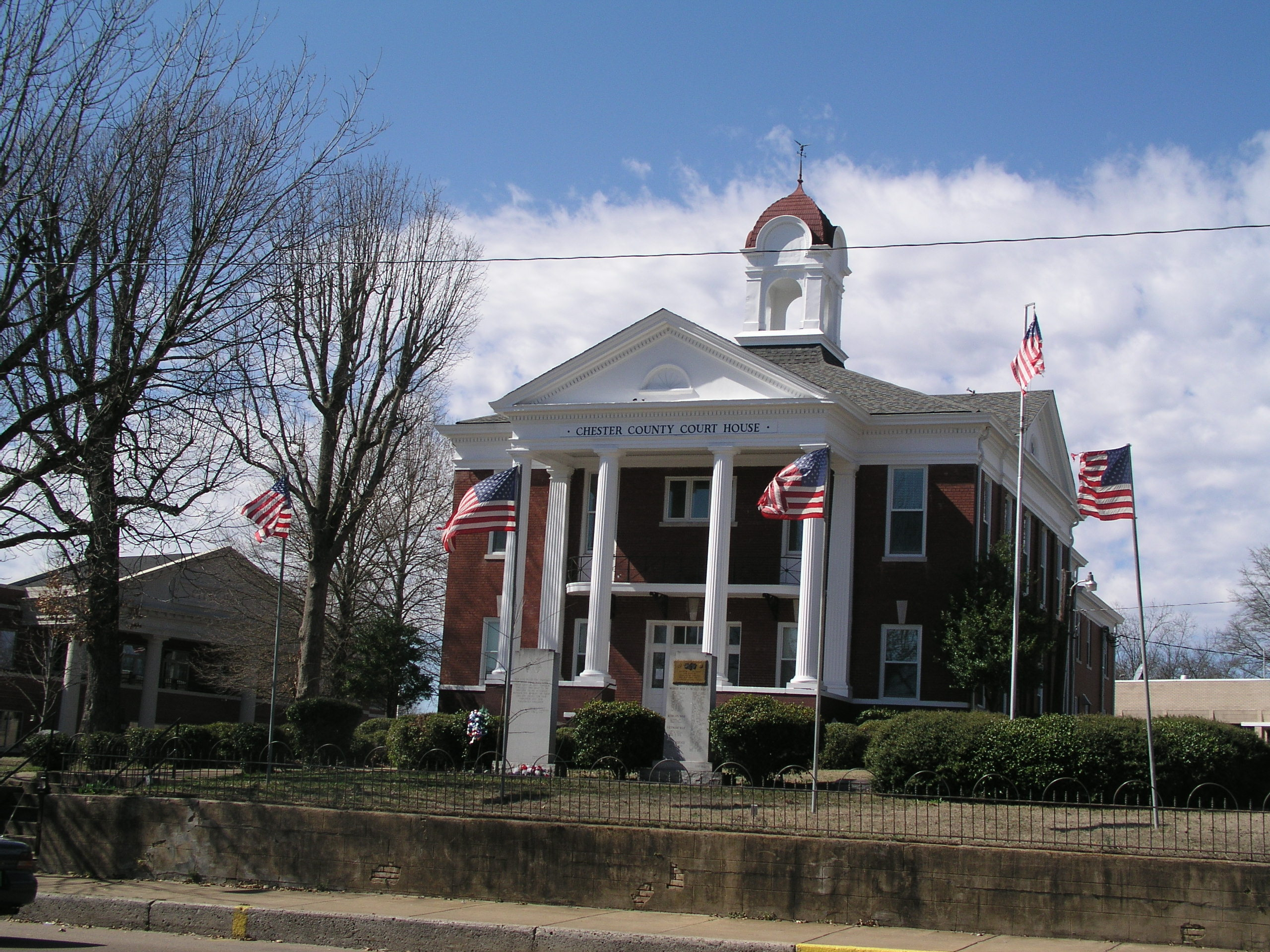
Chester County Courthouse, 2003

Henderson is part of the Chester County School District and home to Chester County High School. It is also the home of Freed-Hardeman University.

== Notable people ==
- Eddy Arnold, country musician, born in Henderson in 1918.
- Jack Dalton, Major League Baseball player, born in Henderson in 1885.
- Dorsey B. Hardeman, Texas politician, born in Henderson in 1902.
- Robby Novak, actor who plays Kid President, born in Henderson in 2004.
- Walton Bryan Stewart, Wisconsin politician, born in Henderson in 1914.
- Sue Shelton White, national feminist leader and suffragist lawyer, born in Henderson in 1887.
- Coleman Williams, American country music singer and songwriter, born in Henderson in 1991.
- Joseph Alexander Cain (1920-1980), artist and educator
- Blue Tears, American hard rock band founded in Henderson in 1983.
