= National Register of Historic Places listings in Giles County, Tennessee =

Location of Giles County in Tennessee

This is a list of the National Register of Historic Places listings in Giles County, Tennessee.

This is intended to be a complete list of the properties and districts on the National Register of Historic Places in Giles County, Tennessee, United States. Latitude and longitude coordinates are provided for many National Register properties and districts; these locations may be seen together in a map.

There are 33 properties and districts listed on the National Register in the county. Three previously listed sites have been delisted.

Contents: Counties in Tennessee
Anderson – Bedford – Benton – Bledsoe – Blount – Bradley – Campbell – Cannon – Carroll – Carter – Cheatham – Chester – Claiborne – Clay – Cocke – Coffee – Crockett – Cumberland – Davidson – Decatur – DeKalb – Dickson – Dyer – Fayette – Fentress – Franklin – Gibson – Giles – Grainger – Greene – Grundy – Hamblen – Hamilton – Hancock – Hardeman – Hardin – Hawkins – Haywood – Henderson – Henry – Hickman – Houston – Humphreys – Jackson – Jefferson – Johnson – Knox – Lake – Lauderdale – Lawrence – Lewis – Lincoln – Loudon – Macon – Madison – Marion – Marshall – Maury – McMinn – McNairy – Meigs – Monroe – Montgomery – Moore – Morgan – Obion – Overton – Perry – Pickett – Polk – Putnam – Rhea – Roane – Robertson – Rutherford – Scott – Sequatchie – Sevier – Shelby – Smith – Stewart – Sullivan – Sumner – Tipton – Trousdale – Unicoi – Union – Van Buren – Warren – Washington – Wayne – Weakley – White – Williamson – Wilson

This National Park Service list is complete through NPS recent listings posted July 31, 2026.

== Current listings ==
	Name on the Register	Image	Date listed	Location	City or town	Description
1	Abernathy Farm	Abernathy Farm	April 19, 2001 (#01000393)	9441 Elkton Pike; 35°05′51″N 86°57′32″W	Conway	
2	Bass-Morrell House	Bass-Morrell House	November 10, 1988 (#88002615)	2898 TN-273/Bryson Rd. 35°05′19″N 86°51′54″W	Ardmore	
4	Bodenham (Colored) School	Bodenham (Colored) School	April 5, 2006 (#06000219)	830 Gimlet Creek Rd. 35°15′05″N 87°10′24″W	Bodeham	
5	Bodenham Mill	Bodenham Mill	March 27, 2013 (#13000122)	690 Bodenham Rd. 35°13′59″N 87°09′19″W	Pulaski	
6	Bridgeforth High School	Bridgeforth High School	August 9, 2006 (#06000697)	1095 Bledsoe Rd. 35°12′45″N 87°01′35″W	Pulaski	
7	Brown-Daly-Horne House	Brown-Daly-Horne House	December 6, 1979 (#79002431)	307 W. Madison St. 35°11′58″N 87°02′01″W	Pulaski	
8	Campbell Chapel African Methodist Episcopal Church	Campbell Chapel African Methodist Episcopal Church	June 22, 2000 (#00000725)	311 Mill St. 35°13′30″N 87°02′15″W	Pulaski	
9	Church of the Messiah	Church of the Messiah	July 28, 1983 (#83003031)	W. Madison and N. 3rd Sts. 35°12′00″N 87°01′59″W	Pulaski	
10	Clifton Place		April 11, 1973 (#73001767)	Campbellsville Rd. 35°16′05″N 87°04′24″W	Wales	
11	Elk River Fortification		September 29, 1998 (#98001212)	Address Restricted	Prospect	
12	First Presbyterian Church of Pulaski	First Presbyterian Church of Pulaski	July 28, 1983 (#83003032)	202 S. 2nd St. 35°11′53″N 87°01′59″W	Pulaski	
13	Matt Gardner House	Matt Gardner House	July 28, 1995 (#95000942)	110 Dixon Town Rd. 35°02′46″N 86°53′11″W	Prospect	
14	Hallehurst	Hallehurst	September 6, 2006 (#06000799)	106 Little Dry Creek Rd. 35°15′13″N 87°05′22″W	Pulaski	
15	Austin Hewitt Home	Austin Hewitt Home	December 13, 1984 (#84000611)	322 E. Washington St. 35°12′04″N 87°01′38″W	Pulaski	
16	Lairdland Farm House	Lairdland Farm House	September 7, 1995 (#95001088)	3238 Blackburn Hollow Rd. 35°16′33″N 86°54′00″W	Brick Church	
17	Lynnville Historic District		April 1, 1988 (#88000225)	Roughly bounded by Mill St., Main, and School Rd., and Long St., the former L&N railroad line, and Water and Buggs Sts. 35°22′36″N 87°00′23″W	Lynnville	
18	Maplewood Cemetery	Maplewood Cemetery	November 15, 2005 (#05000854)	South Sam Davis Ave. 35°11′38″N 87°01′43″W	Pulaski	
19	Milky Way Farm	Milky Way Farm	September 27, 1984 (#84003537)	U.S. Route 31; 35°18′37″N 87°02′15″W	Pulaski	
20	Olivet United Methodist Church, Parsonage and School	Olivet United Methodist Church, Parsonage and School	July 19, 1984 (#84003538)	Columbia Pike; 35°17′40″N 87°01′34″W	Riversburg	
21	Original Church of God	Original Church of God	August 9, 2006 (#06000698)	115 Gordon St. 35°12′34″N 87°01′41″W	Pulaski	
22	Pisgah United Methodist Church and Cemetery	Pisgah United Methodist Church and Cemetery	November 23, 1984 (#84000330)	Pisgah Rd. 35°10′46″N 86°54′43″W	Pisgah	
23	Pulaski Courthouse Square Historic District	Pulaski Courthouse Square Historic District	August 11, 1983 (#83003033)	1st, Jefferson, Madison, and 2nd Sts.; also 114 E. Jefferson St. 35°11′59″N 87°01′52″W	Pulaski	114 Jefferson represents a boundary increase of July 3, 1997
24	Reveille	Reveille	October 28, 1994 (#94001273)	408 W. Madison; 35°12′01″N 87°02′04″W	Pulaski	
25	Sam Davis Avenue Historic District	Sam Davis Avenue Historic District	March 2, 1989 (#89000148)	Sam Davis Ave. and E. Madison St. 35°11′51″N 87°01′37″W	Pulaski	
26	Dr. Benjamin Franklin Smith House	Dr. Benjamin Franklin Smith House	August 23, 2006 (#06000728)	13494 Columbia Highway; 35°22′42″N 87°01′54″W	Waco	
27	South Pulaski Historic District	South Pulaski Historic District	July 10, 1986 (#86001556)	Roughly bounded by W. College, 1st, Cemetery, and S. 3rd Sts. 35°11′41″N 87°02′02″W	Pulaski	
28	George W. Tillery House	George W. Tillery House	July 5, 1985 (#85001486)	U.S. Route 31; 35°14′10″N 87°02′35″W	Pulaski	
29	Elisha White House	Elisha White House	March 4, 1983 (#83003034)	West of Waco on Yokley Rd. 35°22′32″N 87°02′09″W	Waco	
30	Newton White House	Newton White House	October 22, 1987 (#87001884)	1961 Bledsoe Rd. 35°13′56″N 87°01′09″W	Pulaski	
31	Copeland Whitfield House	Copeland Whitfield House	July 7, 1988 (#88001021)	Bee Line Highway; 35°10′21″N 87°00′59″W	Pulaski	
32	Wilkerson Place	Wilkerson Place	October 23, 1986 (#86002899)	300 Gunter Smith Rd. 35°17′56″N 87°04′51″W	Wales	
33	Wilkinson-Martin House	Wilkinson-Martin House	March 17, 2010 (#10000085)	954 N. 1st St. 35°12′34″N 87°01′38″W	Pulaski	
34	Wilson-Young House		April 13, 1973 (#73001766)	Southwest of Dellrose off Interstate 65; 35°05′45″N 86°50′19″W	Dellrose	

== Former listings ==
Two other properties were once listed, but have since been removed:

	Name on the Register	Image	Date listed	Date removed	Location	City or town	Description
1	Batte-Brown-Blackburn House	Batte-Brown-Blackburn House	June 7, 1996 (#96000659)	March 10, 2009	318 W. Madison St. 35°11′59″N 87°01′55″W	Pulaski	Currently named Grissom Colonial Hall and owned by Martin Methodist College. Original building was damaged in a fire in 2000, and subsequently razed in 2001
2	Bethany Presbyterian Church Complex		November 13, 1989 (#89001968)	March 27, 2020	Elkton Rd. 35°05′51″N 86°51′39″W	Bryson	
3	Noblit-Lytle House		August 1, 2008 (#08000734)	July 25, 2018	1311 Sugar Creek Rd. 35°01′38″N 87°13′00″W	Minor Hill	Demolished in 2018.

== See also ==
- List of National Historic Landmarks in Tennessee
- National Register of Historic Places listings in Tennessee
