= Tornado outbreak of March 13–14, 1913 =

Weather event in the United States

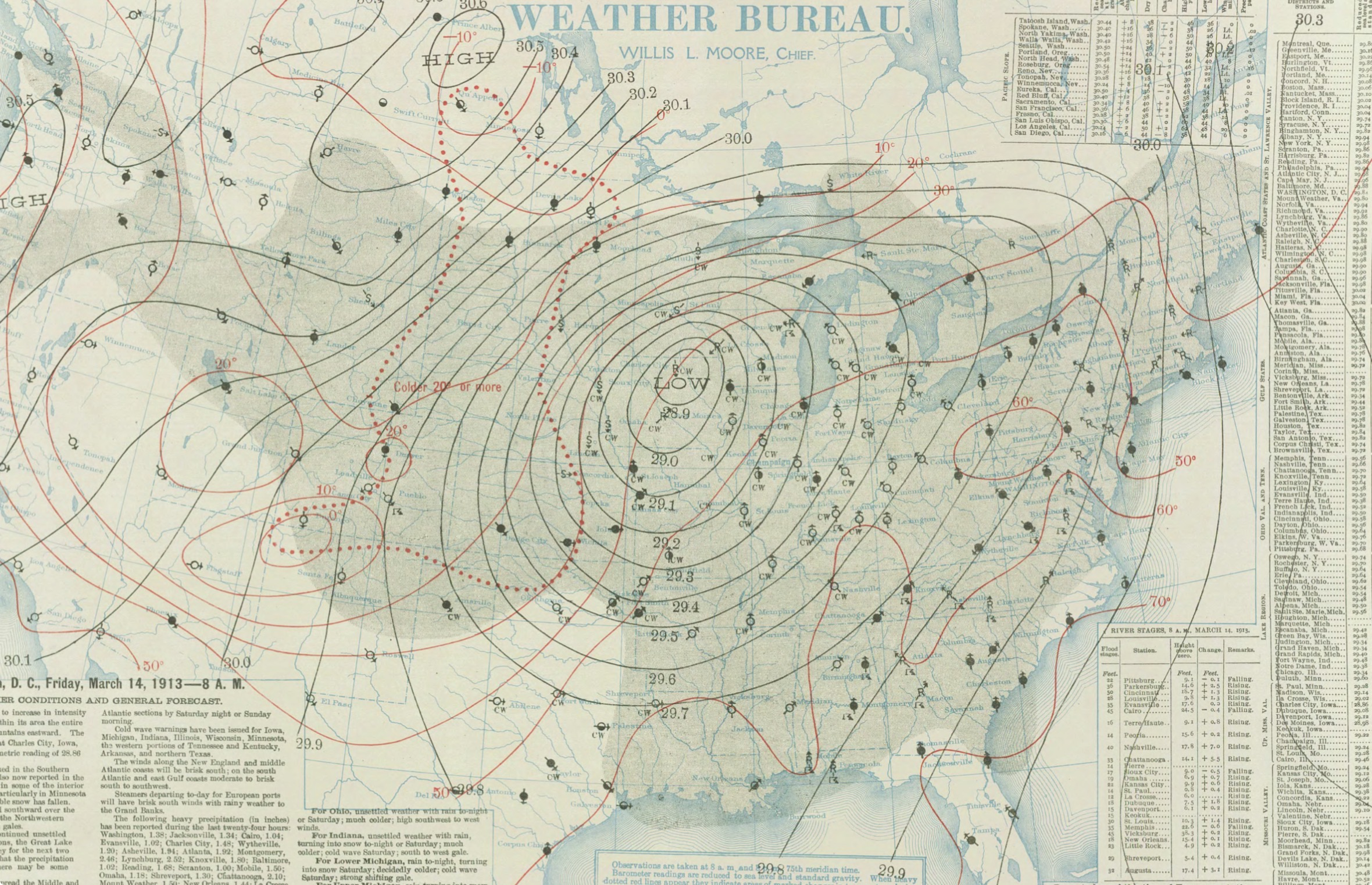
- Weather map on March 14 showing the low-pressure area that spawned the outbreak

Tornado outbreak
- Tornadoes: ≥ 23
- Max. rating: F4 tornado
- Duration: March 13–14, 1913

Overall effects
- Fatalities: ≥ 76
- Injuries: ≥ 501
- Damage: > $228,200 ($7,430,000 in 2025 USD) (Note: All losses are in 1913 United States dollars unless otherwise noted.)
- Areas affected: Midwestern and Southern United States
- Part of the tornadoes and tornado outbreaks of 1913

On March 13–14, 1913, a tornado outbreak affected portions of the south-central United States, killing at least 76 people and injuring 501 others. The deadliest tornado of the outbreak, retroactively rated F4 on the Fujita scale, killed 15 people in Georgia. A pair of long-lived F4s in Tennessee collectively claimed 16 more lives. An F3 in Louisiana killed nine more people, and an F3 in Georgia caused eight additional fatalities. An F2 tornado family in Mississippi inflicted half a dozen more deaths as well, as did an F3 family in Tennessee. Many tornadoes in the outbreak were both large and long-tracked. (Note: An outbreak is generally defined as a group of at least six tornadoes (the number sometimes varies slightly according to local climatology) with no more than a six-hour gap between individual tornadoes. An outbreak sequence, prior to (after) the start of modern records in 1950, is defined as a period of no more than two (one) consecutive days without at least one significant (F2 or stronger) tornado.)

== Confirmed tornadoes ==
Confirmed tornadoes by Fujita rating
FU	F0	F1	F2	F3	F4	F5	Total
1	0	1	12	6	3	0	≥ 23

- Tornadoes may have hit Putnam and Wilson counties in Tennessee.

Prior to 1990, there is a likely undercount of tornadoes, particularly E/F0–1, with reports of weaker tornadoes becoming more common as population increased. A sharp increase in the annual average E/F0–1 count by approximately 200 tornadoes was noted upon the implementation of NEXRAD Doppler weather radar in 1990–1991. (Note: Historically, the number of tornadoes globally and in the United States was and is likely underrepresented: research by Grazulis on annual tornado activity suggests that, as of 2001, only 53% of yearly U.S. tornadoes were officially recorded. Documentation of tornadoes outside the United States was historically less exhaustive, owing to the lack of monitors in many nations and, in some cases, to internal political controls on public information. Most countries only recorded tornadoes that produced severe damage or loss of life. Significant low biases in U.S. tornado counts likely occurred through the early 1990s, when advanced NEXRAD was first installed and the National Weather Service began comprehensively verifying tornado occurrences.) 1974 marked the first year where significant tornado (E/F2+) counts became homogenous with contemporary values, attributed to the consistent implementation of Fujita scale assessments. (Note: The Fujita scale was devised under the aegis of scientist T. Theodore Fujita in the early 1970s. Prior to the advent of the scale in 1971, tornadoes in the United States were officially unrated. Tornado ratings were retroactively applied to events prior to the formal adoption of the F-scale by the National Weather Service. While the Fujita scale has been superseded by the Enhanced Fujita scale in the U.S. since February 1, 2007, Canada used the old scale until April 1, 2013; nations elsewhere, like the United Kingdom, apply other classifications such as the TORRO scale.) Numerous discrepancies on the details of tornadoes in this outbreak exist between sources. The total count of tornadoes and ratings differs from various agencies accordingly. The list below documents information from the most contemporary official sources alongside assessments from tornado historian Thomas P. Grazulis.

=== March 13 event ===
List of confirmed tornadoes – Thursday, March 13, 1913
F#	Location	County / Parish	State	Time (UTC) (Note: All dates are based on the local time zone where the tornado touched down; however, all times are in Coordinated Universal Time and dates are split at midnight CST/CDT for consistency.)	Path length	Width (Note: The listed width values are primarily the average/mean width of the tornadoes, with those having known maximum widths denoted by ♯. From 1952 to 1994, reports largely list mean width whereas contemporary years list maximum width. Values provided by Grazulis are the average width, with estimates being rounded down (i.e., 0.5 mi (0.80 km) is rounded down from 880 yards to 800 yards).)	Damage (Note: The National Oceanic and Atmospheric Administration's Storm Data publication does not list exact damage totals for every event, instead giving damage categories. As such, damage for individual tornadoes is not comprehensive.)
F2	Southern Brookeland	Sabine	TX	15:15–?	4 mi (6.4 km)	200 yd (180 m)	Unknown
F2	1 death – A wide, low-end F2 tornado hit 50 buildings, wrecking half a dozen of them, including a church and a home. Of the 50 injuries, just four were critical.						
F2	Northern Union Parish (LA) to Blanchard Springs (AR) to Caledonia (AR) to Hibank (AR)	Union (LA), Union (AR)	LA, AR	15:30–?	10 mi (16 km)	880 yd (800 m)♯	$24,000
F2	1 death – A possible tornado family destroyed 15 homes, while damaging stores and other buildings. 47 injuries occurred.						
F3	W of Florien to S of Many to S of Fisher to Provencal	Sabine, Natchitoches	LA	15:30–16:00	25 mi (40 km)	880 yd (800 m)♯	>$50,000
F3	9 deaths – An intense tornado destroyed 20 or more homes and killed hundreds of livestock. Four family members died in a home near Fisher, and 50 injuries occurred along the path.						
F2	NE of Oxford to W of Hickory Flat	Lafayette, Marshall, Benton	MS	18:30–?	15 mi (24 km)	Unknown	Unknown
F2	1 death – A tornado, the first member of a long-tracked family, destroyed or damaged 12 homes, injuring 20 people, and considerably damaged farms.						
F2	Near Algoma to near Marietta	Pontotoc, Lee, Prentiss	MS	19:00–?	35 mi (56 km)	Unknown	Unknown
F2	6 deaths – A tornado family flattened homes near Guntown and destroyed other buildings near Chesterville, injuring a total of 35 people. Five of the six deaths occurred near Chesterville.						
F4	SW of Middleton to ENE of Henderson	Hardeman, McNairy, Chester	TN	19:15–?	40 mi (64 km)	400 yd (370 m)	Unknown
F4	10 deaths – Possibly originating in Tippah County, Mississippi, this violent tornado was related to the Oxford–Hickory Flat F2. Near Middleton it obliterated a few homes, claiming five lives. It also injured 22 pupils and a schoolteacher there, while destroying 20 or more buildings. It leveled more homes near Henderson, claiming three lives, and killed two more people near McNairy. In the McNairy–Finger area it wrecked 10 buildings, while blowing down outbuildings and fences near Henderson. In all it destroyed 50 homes, all of which were frail, and injured 50 people.						
F2	E of Green Hill (AL) to Springer Station (TN) to SSE of Ethridge (TN)	Lauderdale (AL), Lawrence (TN)	AL, TN	19:45–?	25 mi (40 km)	200 yd (180 m)	>$200
F2	A tornado destroyed a sawmill, a few barns, fences, and several homes. It also downed trees, blew a house off its foundation, and partly destroyed an additional pair of barns. It passed just east of Iron City and Lawrenceburg. Grazulis incorrectly attributed a death and six injuries to the tornado, according to research by the National Weather Service in Nashville.						
F4	E of Huron to Lexington to Cavvia to S of Camden	Henderson, Carroll, Benton	TN	20:00–?	40 mi (64 km)	400 yd (370 m)	Unknown
F4	6 deaths – A violent tornado wrecked 24 or more farms, along with various public buildings and 58 houses in Lexington. At the latter place it destroyed the "most substantial" homes, but only leveled "poorer" ones, Grazulis reported, killing three people. According to the Monthly Weather Review, "shade trees that had ornamented the town for generations were strewn in all directions", and at least 100 buildings were destroyed. Between Camden and Cavvia the tornado destroyed at least 40 more buildings, causing a few additional deaths. In all 45 injuries occurred.						
F2	W of Pulaski to Waco to Pleasant Grove to N of Hill	Giles, Maury	TN	20:15–?	25 mi (40 km)	Unknown	Unknown
F2	2+ deaths – A strong tornado destroyed 10 homes, felled thousands of trees, and blew down a pair of chimneys at the Newton White House, crossing the Duck River. Some additional deaths were rumored. 25 people were injured.						
F3	N of Sumac to Duncanville to Lillard Mill to SW of Caney Spring	Giles, Marshall	TN	20:30–?	25 mi (40 km)	800 yd (730 m)	Unknown
F3	2 deaths – An intense tornado destroyed several barns and homes, along with the front of a store. It badly damaged a number of farms, while also doing lesser damage to a mill and school. West of Cornersville, it hit the Mars Hill school, killing a student, and near Duncanville tossed a woman hundreds of yards. At Wilson Hill it hit a third school, killing a teacher. Along its track it mostly inflicted F1–F2 damage, doing F3 damage to just one home. A few people were injured.						
F1	S of Hardison Mill to WNW of Bear Wallow	Maury, Marshall	TN	20:45–?	7.5 mi (12.1 km)	Unknown	Unknown
F1	1 death – A tornado damaged houses, a mill, and several other buildings, striking farms. It also knocked down a barn, killing a man inside.						
F3	Chapel Hill to E of Eagleville to near Blackman to SE of Smyrna	Marshall, Rutherford	TN	21:00–?	25 mi (40 km)	Unknown	Unknown
F3	4 deaths – Related to the Sumac–Caney Spring F3, this tornado killed four family members in a home near Windrow. It also extensively damaged an academy and a church. In the Blackman–Eagleville area it blew homes off their foundations and badly damaged a number of others. Farms were damaged as well, and a boy was carried 300 yd (270 m). Downburst damage was reported near the end of the path. 15 injuries occurred. Grazulis considered this and the previous F3 a 50-mile-long (80 km) family.						
F3	Duke to Calvins Gap to Mount Gideon	Calhoun	AL	21:25–?	15 mi (24 km)	500 yd (460 m)♯	Unknown
F3	4 deaths – A tornado destroyed a church, store, and school, along with 10 homes. It also wrecked barns, leveled trees, and drove a 2-by-4-inch (51 by 102 mm) board 8 ft (2.4 m) into the earth. 10 injuries occurred.						
F2	Near Wilsonville to W of Childersburg	Shelby, Talladega	AL	21:30–?	12 mi (19 km)	400 yd (370 m)♯	$4,000
F2	A tornado destroyed a school, injuring a number of pupils and a teacher. It also wrecked several other buildings, injuring eight people in all.						
F2	W of Tanner	Limestone	AL	23:00–?	Unknown	Unknown	Unknown
F2	A tornado destroyed a pair of spacious homes, along with several smaller ones. Three deaths may have occurred. 15 injuries were confirmed.						
FU	Eastern Atlanta	Fulton	GA	~00:00–?	≤13 mi (21 km)	Unknown	Unknown
FU	A tornado formed just east of the Confederate Soldiers' Home.						
F3	W of Decatur to between Clarkston and Tucker	DeKalb, Gwinnett	GA	00:00–?	12 mi (19 km)	100 yd (91 m)	Unknown
F3	8 deaths – A tornado destroyed several farms and leveled timber, injuring 20 people.						
F4	N of Armuchee to Curryville to near Resaca	Floyd, Gordon	GA	02:00–?	25 mi (40 km)	1,760 yd (1,610 m)♯	Unknown
F4	15 deaths – A large, violent tornado swept away numerous homes, impacting 30 farms. It caused fatalities on seven farms, mainly near Curryville, where it killed five children in a family. 50 injuries occurred.						
F3	Hokes Bluff	Etowah	AL	Unknown	≥7 mi (11 km)	Unknown	Unknown
F3	4 deaths – A tornado hit three homes, injuring 25 people, and may have continued to Gaylesville.						
F2	E of Petersburg	Pike	IN	Unknown	Unknown	Unknown	Unknown
F2	A tornado unroofed and destroyed a school, injuring seven students.						

=== March 14 event ===
List of confirmed tornadoes – Friday, March 14, 1913
F#	Location	County / Parish	State	Time (UTC)	Path length	Width	Damage
F2	E of Montgomery	Montgomery, Macon	AL	07:00–?	4 mi (6.4 km)	50 yd (46 m)	Unknown
F2	1 death – A tornado hit a plantation, destroying a small home and injuring 15 people.						
F2	Unknown	Bullock	AL	08:00–?	Unknown	Unknown	Unknown
F2	1 death – A tornado destroyed many homes at the Wiley Hill plantation.						
F2	Girard (AL) to Columbus (GA)	Russell (AL), Muscogee (GA)	AL, GA	09:30–?	8 mi (13 km)	50 yd (46 m)	$150,000
F2	Starting in present-day Phenix City, a strong tornado destroyed or damaged 40 buildings there, including 10 homes. Entering Georgia, it struck downtown Columbus, downing trees, unroofing stores, and damaging factories. Downbursts accompanied the tornado, doing most of the damage. A dozen injuries occurred.						

== See also ==
- Dixie Alley
- List of North American tornadoes and tornado outbreaks

== Sources ==
- Alciatore, H. F. (March 1913). "Tornadoes in Arkansas, March 1913". Monthly Weather Review. 41 (3). Washington, D.C.: United States Weather Bureau: 415. Bibcode:1913MWRv...41..415A. doi:10.1175/1520-0493(1913)41<415b:TIAM>2.0.CO;2 – via American Meteorological Society.
- Cline, Isaac M. (March 1913). "Severe local storms, Louisiana". Monthly Weather Review. 41 (3). Washington, D.C.: United States Weather Bureau: 415. Bibcode:1913MWRv...41..415C. doi:10.1175/1520-0493(1913)41<415a:SLSL>2.0.CO;2 – via American Meteorological Society.
- Emery, S. C. (March 1913). "Severe storms in western Tennessee" (PDF). Monthly Weather Review. 41 (3). Washington, D.C.: United States Weather Bureau: 415–6. Bibcode:1913MWRv...41..415E. doi:10.1175/1520-0493(1913)41<415c:SSIWT>2.0.CO;2. Archived from the original (PDF) on 3 March 2017 – via American Meteorological Society.
- Agee, Ernest M.; Childs, Samuel (June 1, 2014). "Adjustments in Tornado Counts, F-Scale Intensity, and Path Width for Assessing Significant Tornado Destruction". Journal of Applied Meteorology and Climatology. 53 (6). American Meteorological Society: 1494–1505. Bibcode:2014JApMC..53.1494A. doi:10.1175/JAMC-D-13-0235.1.
- Brooks, Harold E. (April 2004). "On the Relationship of Tornado Path Length and Width to Intensity". Weather and Forecasting. 19 (2): 310–19. Bibcode:2004WtFor..19..310B. doi:10.1175/1520-0434(2004)019<0310:OTROTP>2.0.CO;2.
- Cook, A. R.; Schaefer, J. T. (August 2008). "The Relation of El Niño–Southern Oscillation (ENSO) to Winter Tornado Outbreaks". Monthly Weather Review. 136 (8): 3121–3137. Bibcode:2008MWRv..136.3121C. doi:10.1175/2007MWR2171.1.
- Edwards, Roger; LaDue, James G.; Ferree, John T.; Scharfenberg, Kevin; Maier, Chris; Coulbourne, William L. (May 1, 2013). "Tornado Intensity Estimation: Past, Present, and Future". Bulletin of the American Meteorological Society. 94 (5). American Meteorological Society: 641–653. Bibcode:2013BAMS...94..641E. doi:10.1175/BAMS-D-11-00006.1.
- Grazulis, Thomas P. (May 1984). Violent Tornado Climatography, 1880–1982. OSTI (Technical report). NUREG. Washington, D.C.: Nuclear Regulatory Commission. OSTI 7099491. CR-3670.
  - — (November 1990). Significant Tornadoes 1880–1989. Vol. 2. St. Johnsbury, Vermont: The Tornado Project of Environmental Films. ISBN 1-879362-02-3.
  - — (July 1993). Significant Tornadoes 1680–1991: A Chronology and Analysis of Events. St. Johnsbury, Vermont: The Tornado Project of Environmental Films. ISBN 1-879362-03-1.
  - — (2001a). The Tornado: Nature's Ultimate Windstorm. Norman: University of Oklahoma Press. ISBN 978-0-8061-3538-0.
  - — (2001b). F5-F6 Tornadoes. St. Johnsbury, Vermont: The Tornado Project of Environmental Films.
- Von Hermann, Charles F. (March 1913). "District No. 2, South Atlantic and East Gulf States". Monthly Weather Review. 41 (3). Washington, D.C.: United States Weather Bureau: 340–56. Bibcode:1913MWRv...41..340V. doi:10.1175/1520-0493(1913)41<340:DNSAAE>2.0.CO;2 – via American Meteorological Society.
