= Bass Building =

Bass Building may refer to:

- Bass Building (Tonopah, Nevada), listed on the National Register of Historic Places
- Tom Bass Building, Harris County, Texas, 9-1-1 headquarters building named for Tom Bass (politician)

== See also ==
- Bass House (disambiguation)
- Bass Mansion (disambiguation)
