= Sims House =

Sims House may refer to:

- Phillips-Sims House, Hogansville, Georgia, listed on the NRHP in Georgia
- George R. Sims House, Palmetto, Georgia, listed on the NRHP in Georgia
- Sims-Brown House, Columbus, Mississippi, listed on the NRHP in Mississippi
- Sims House (Jackson, Mississippi), listed on the NRHP in Mississippi
- Sims-Garfield Ranch, Ryegate, Montana, listed on the NRHP in Montana
- Capt. William Sims House, Greenfield, Tennessee, listed on the NRHP in Tennessee
- Wilkinson-Martin House, Pulaski, Tennessee, also known as Sims House, listed on the NRHP in Tennessee
- John Green Sims House, Wartrace, Tennessee, listed on the NRHP in Tennessee
- Sims House (Orange, Texas), listed on the NRHP in Texas
- O. B. Sims House, Waxahachie, Texas, listed on the NRHP in Ellis County, Texas
