= Clifton Place =

Clifton Place may refer to:

- Clifton Place (Columbia, Tennessee), listed on the National Register of Historic Places in Maury County, Tennessee
- Clifton Place (Wales, Tennessee), listed on the National Register of Historic Places in Giles County, Tennessee
