= Bass House =

Bass House may refer to:

- Bass house (music), a style of house music that appeared in the 2010s
- Bass-Perry House, Seale, Alabama, listed on the NRHP in Russell County, Alabama
- Bass Boarding House, Wilton, Maine, NRHP-listed
- Bass-Morrell House, Ardmore, Tennessee, listed on the NRHP in Giles County, Tennessee

== See also ==
- Bassline (music genre)
- Bass Building (disambiguation)
- Bass Mansion (disambiguation)
- Bass Site (disambiguation)
