= Ashland Independent Film Festival =

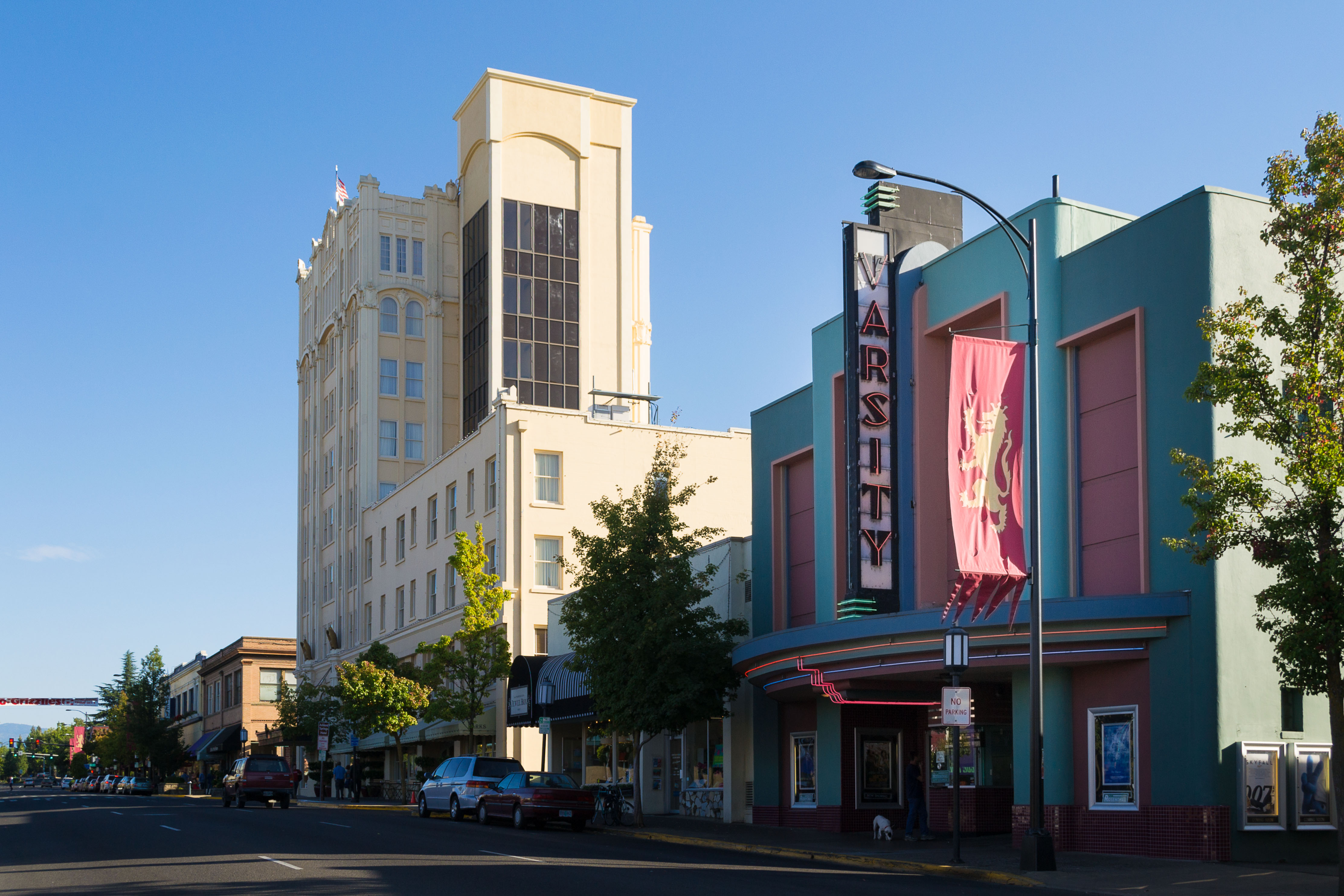
- The Varsity Theatre
- Location: Ashland, Oregon
- Hosted by: Southern Oregon Film Society
- Language: International
- Website: http://www.ashlandfilm.org

The Ashland Independent Film Festival is held in Ashland, Oregon, United States, and has been organized by the non-profit Southern Oregon Film Society since 2001. Founded by D.W. and Steve Wood, the festival is held each spring over five days at the Varsity Theatre in downtown Ashland and the Historic Ashland Armory in the Railroad District. The festival presents international and domestic shorts and features, including drama, comedy, documentary, and animation.

== About ==
Most of the independent films are shown on the five screens at the art-deco Varsity Theatre located in downtown Ashland. Special events and large screenings (including Calvin Marshall, The River Why, and Tattoo the World) are held at the Historic Ashland Armory, which seats 500 people. In addition to the screenings, the Ashland Independent Film Festival hosts several social-gatherings and artistic events. These include an opening-night gala, filmmaker Q&A sessions after screenings, filmmaker panels, art exhibits, and a nightly lounge. In 2010, approximately 6,500 people attended the film festival, collectively purchasing 16,800 tickets.

=== Local programs ===
In addition to submissions from around the globe, the festival has a free entrance policy for local filmmakers to motivate them to submit their films. It also aims to encourage Ashland residents to attend by running two free "Locals Only" programs during the festival. The festival also has a program that is free to all students in Southern Oregon and encourages them to make their own films to submit. In 2010, a special "Made in Oregon" presentation was added to the festival's awards ceremony in acknowledgment of the record set: 25% of the films presented at the festival were shot in Oregon.

=== Awards ===
- Best Feature
- Best Documentary: Feature Length
- Best Documentary: Short Subject
- Best Animated Short
- Best Short
- Best Acting Ensemble
- Family Choice
- Best Short Film: Dramatic or Documentary
- Rogue Creamery Audience Award: Best Documentary
- John C. Schweiger Audience Award: Dramatic Feature
- Best Cinematography, The Gerald Hirschfeld, ASC Award: Feature
- Rogue Award

=== Past special guests ===
- Les Blank
- Ty Burrell
- Bruce Campbell
- Chris Cooper
- Eleanor Coppola
- Alex Cox
- Barbara Hammer
- Ed Hardy
- Helen Hunt
- James Ivory
- Barbara Kopple
- Greg Louganis
- Albert Maysles
- Elvis Mitchell
- Bill Plympton
- Julia Reichert
- Harry Shearer
- Lynn Shelton
- Cheryl Strayed
- Julie Taymor
- Ondi Timoner
- Will Vinton
- Lucy Walker

=== Economic impact ===
The 2010 festival attendees, 40% of whom came from outside of Ashland, had a $2.8 million economic impact in the community in the 2010 fiscal year. More than 1200 attendees completed surveys from which the following information was gathered:

- 86% patronized local restaurants
- 62% patronized local retail shops
- 25% patronized local galleries

== Praise & Recognition ==
The festival continues to gain national attention as a high-quality regional film festival.

- Ernest Hardy of LA Weekly said the festival is "well on its way to being one of my favorite American film festivals, period. It's the almost-perfect blend of programming, audience and location."
- Shawn Levy of The Oregonian said the festival "offers movie lovers that same sense of being in a magical place...Southern Oregon doesn't have anything else like it -- nor, in fact, do most places on Earth."
- Upon her visit to the festival, Academy Award-winning Actress Helen Hunt that "Ashland is a paradise and the film festival is a rich, beautiful thing to be a part of."
- "The Best Online Film Festivals of 2020, Presented by FilmFreeway"
- MovieMaker Magazine placed the Ashland Independent Film Festival on their 2014, 2015, 2016, 2018, 2019 lists of "50 Festivals Worth The Entry Fee"
- MovieMaker Magazine placed the Ashland Independent Film Festival on their 2016 list of "THE 25 COOLEST FILM FESTIVALS IN THE WORLD"
- MovieMaker Magazine placed the Ashland Independent Film Festival on their 2014 list of "BEST PLACES TO LIVE AND WORK AS A MOVIEMAKER IN 2014, TOP TOWNS: #2. ASHLAND, OR"
- MovieMaker Magazine placed the Ashland Independent Film Festival on their 2013 list of "BEST OF: THE COOLEST FILM FESTIVALS IN THE WORLD"
- MovieMaker Magazine placed the Ashland Independent Film Festival on their 2009 list of "25 Festivals Worth The Entry Fee"
- "The Joys of the Regional Festival: Why You Should Attend Small Market Festivals (And How to Pick Out the Great Ones)"

== Achievements ==
- On October 25, 2007 the Academy of Motion Picture Arts and Sciences presented the AIFF with a $20,000 grant to help bring more filmmakers, actors and subjects of documentaries to the festival.
- The festival was again awarded this grant in the amount of $17,500 in 2010 for the 2011 festival.
