= National Register of Historic Places listings in Weakley County, Tennessee =

Location of Weakley County in Tennessee

The 12 properties and districts listed here are intended to comprise all those in Weakley County, Tennessee, United States, that are on the National Register of Historic Places. Latitude and longitude coordinates are provided for many National Register properties and districts; these locations may be seen together in a map.

Another site was once listed in the Register but was removed in 2010.

Contents: Counties in Tennessee
Anderson – Bedford – Benton – Bledsoe – Blount – Bradley – Campbell – Cannon – Carroll – Carter – Cheatham – Chester – Claiborne – Clay – Cocke – Coffee – Crockett – Cumberland – Davidson – Decatur – DeKalb – Dickson – Dyer – Fayette – Fentress – Franklin – Gibson – Giles – Grainger – Greene – Grundy – Hamblen – Hamilton – Hancock – Hardeman – Hardin – Hawkins – Haywood – Henderson – Henry – Hickman – Houston – Humphreys – Jackson – Jefferson – Johnson – Knox – Lake – Lauderdale – Lawrence – Lewis – Lincoln – Loudon – Macon – Madison – Marion – Marshall – Maury – McMinn – McNairy – Meigs – Monroe – Montgomery – Moore – Morgan – Obion – Overton – Perry – Pickett – Polk – Putnam – Rhea – Roane – Robertson – Rutherford – Scott – Sequatchie – Sevier – Shelby – Smith – Stewart – Sullivan – Sumner – Tipton – Trousdale – Unicoi – Union – Van Buren – Warren – Washington – Wayne – Weakley – White – Williamson – Wilson

This National Park Service list is complete through NPS recent listings posted May 29, 2026.

== Current listings ==
	Name on the Register	Image	Date listed	Location	City or town	Description
1	Dr. Robert W. Bandy House		August 9, 1984 (#84003726)	College St. 36°12′45″N 88°36′48″W	Gleason	
2	William Parker Caldwell House	William Parker Caldwell House	March 9, 1979 (#79002485)	Off State Route 22; 36°21′55″N 88°53′37″W	Gardner	
3	Cary Lawn		June 18, 1992 (#92000779)	321 Linden St. 36°17′16″N 88°42′18″W	Dresden	
4	First Christian Church		November 15, 2002 (#02001338)	308 College St; 36°12′46″N 88°36′49″W	Gleason	
5	Ivandale	Ivandale	March 25, 1982 (#82004067)	115 N. McCombs St. 36°20′38″N 88°50′49″W	Martin	
6	W.T. Lawler House	W.T. Lawler House	March 25, 1982 (#82004068)	229 University St. 36°20′34″N 88°51′24″W	Martin	
7	Marshalldale	Marshalldale	March 25, 1982 (#82004069)	115 Ryan Ave. 36°20′12″N 88°50′57″W	Martin	
8	Martin Downtown Commercial Historic District	Martin Downtown Commercial Historic District	July 10, 2023 (#100009137)	District boundary encompasses the main commercial corridor along the 200, 300, and 400 blks. of Lindell St., and the 300 block of Broadway. 36°20′36″N 88°51′02″W	Martin	
9	Capt. William Sims House		March 25, 1982 (#82004066)	Route 2, Liberty Rd. 36°12′13″N 88°42′26″W	Greenfield vicinity	
10	University Street Historic District		July 5, 1996 (#96000750)	225-248 University St. 36°20′35″N 88°51′23″W	Martin	
11	US Post Office	US Post Office	July 5, 1996 (#96000751)	100 Main St. 36°20′36″N 88°51′01″W	Martin	Former Post Office
12	Varsity Theatre	Varsity Theatre	July 16, 2010 (#10000464)	104 Oxford St. 36°20′36″N 88°51′05″W	Martin	

== Former listings ==
	Name on the Register	Image	Date listed	Date removed	Location	City or town	Description
1	Oakland		April 22, 1982 (#82004065)	March 17, 2010	State Routes 22 and 89; 36°17′05″N 88°43′45″W	Dresden	

== See also ==
- List of National Historic Landmarks in Tennessee
- National Register of Historic Places listings in Tennessee
