= Hewitt House =

Hewitt House may refer to:

in the United States (by state then town)

- Edwin H. Hewitt House, Minneapolis, Minnesota, listed on the National Register of Historic Places (NRHP) in Hennepin County
- Dr. Charles Hewitt Laboratory, Red Wing, Minnesota, listed on the NRHP in Goodhue County
- Hewitt House (Enfield, New Hampshire), listed on the NRHP in Grafton County
- Austin Hewitt Home, Pulaski, Tennessee, listed on the NRHP in Giles County
- M. S. Hewitt House, Georgetown, Texas, listed on the NRHP in Williamson County
- Preslar-Hewitt Building, Taylor, Texas, listed on the NRHP in Williamson County
