= Bass Site =

Bass Site may refer to:

- Bass Site (Yellow Jacket, Colorado)
- Raymond Bass Site (22HR636), Biloxi, Mississippi, listed on the NRHP in Harrison County, Mississippi
- Bass Pond Site, Kiawah Island, South Carolina
- Bass Site (47Gt25), Lancaster, Wisconsin, listed on the NRHP in Grant County, Wisconsin

== See also ==
- Bass House (disambiguation)
