= Noblit–Lytle House =

Historic house in Tennessee, United States

- Formerly listed on the U.S. National Register of Historic Places
- Nearest city: Minor Hill, Tennessee
- Area: 178 acres (72 ha)
- Built: 1848
- Architect: Wiley C. Williams
- Architectural style: Greek Revival, Queen Anne
- NRHP reference No.: 08000734

Significant dates
- Added to NRHP: August 1, 2008
- Removed from NRHP: July 25, 2018

The Noblit–Lytle House was a classic example of a log dog-trot house built in 1848 and located in Minor Hill, Tennessee, U.S. It was listed on the National Register of Historic Places between 2008 and 2018, when it was demolished.

== History ==
The Noblit–Lytle House was built in 1848 for Thomas Hughes Noblit, a landowner and slaveholder. During the American Civil War of 1861–1865, the house was ransacked by the Union Army. In the 1890s, it was acquired by Noblit's son-in-law, William F. Lytle. One of his daughters, Dr Mary Lytle, studied dentistry at Vanderbilt University and practiced in Birmingham, Alabama and Anniston, Alabama.

The house was listed on the National Register of Historic Places on August 1, 2008. A very expert and highly detailed account of the house's history was prepared by consultant Robbie D. Jones and placed in the National Register of Historic Places archive.

== Demolition ==
Despite having been listed on the National Register of Historic Places, the Noblit–Lytle House was dismantled and subsequently demolished in 2018 by Mark Bowe and Karen Tillery for the Barnwood Builders TV program, Episode 1 of Season 6. A valuable cultural resource in situ, the Noblit–Lytle House still retained "a high degree of architectural integrity from the ca. 1848–1950 period of significance," according to section 8, page 16 of the National Register listing, but was demolished instead for the acquisition and sale of the "log cabin" wood that comprised the core of the historic structure. It was delisted from the National Register in July 2018.

The Historical Marker Database states there were two metal signs erected in the front of the property by the Tennessee Historical Commission clearly identifying the pioneer homestead as a site of great historical significance.
