= George W. Tillery House =

Historic house in Tennessee, United States

- U.S. National Register of Historic Places
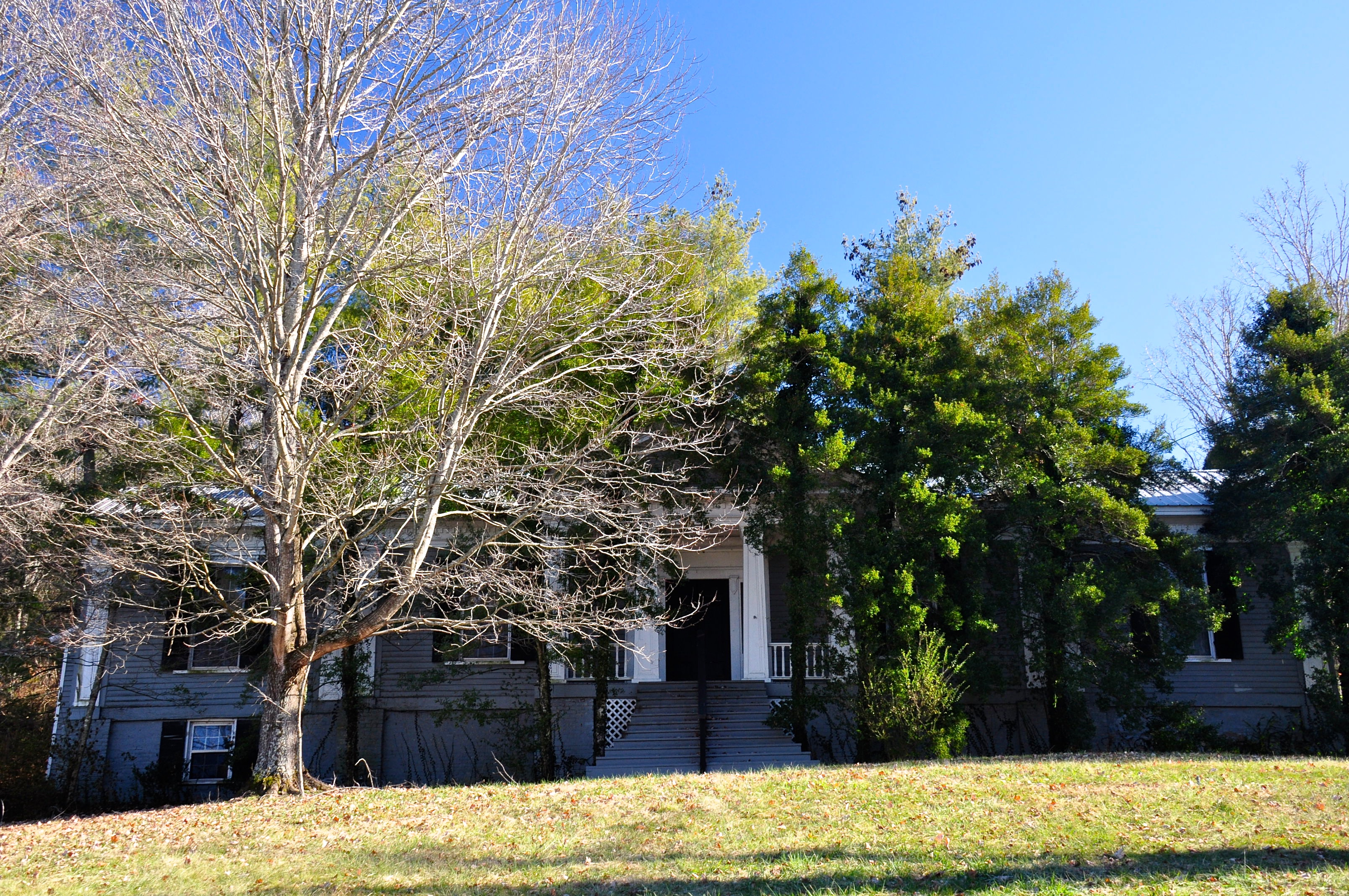
- The George W. Tillery House in 2015

- Location within Tennessee
- Nearest city: Pulaski, Tennessee
- Coordinates: 35°14′10″N 87°2′35″W
- Area: 1.1 acres (0.45 ha)
- Built: 1840
- Architectural style: Greek Revival
- NRHP reference No.: 85001486
- Added to NRHP: July 5, 1985

The George W. Tillery House is a historic mansion in Pulaski, Tennessee, U.S..

== History ==
The land was purchased by George W. Tillery, a carpenter from South Carolina, in 1838. He built the house in 1840. It was designed in the Greek Revival architectural style. Tillery lived in the house until 1869.

The house has been listed on the National Register of Historic Places since July 5, 1985.
