= W.T. Lawler House =

Historic house in Tennessee, United States

- W. T. Lawler House
- U.S. National Register of Historic Places
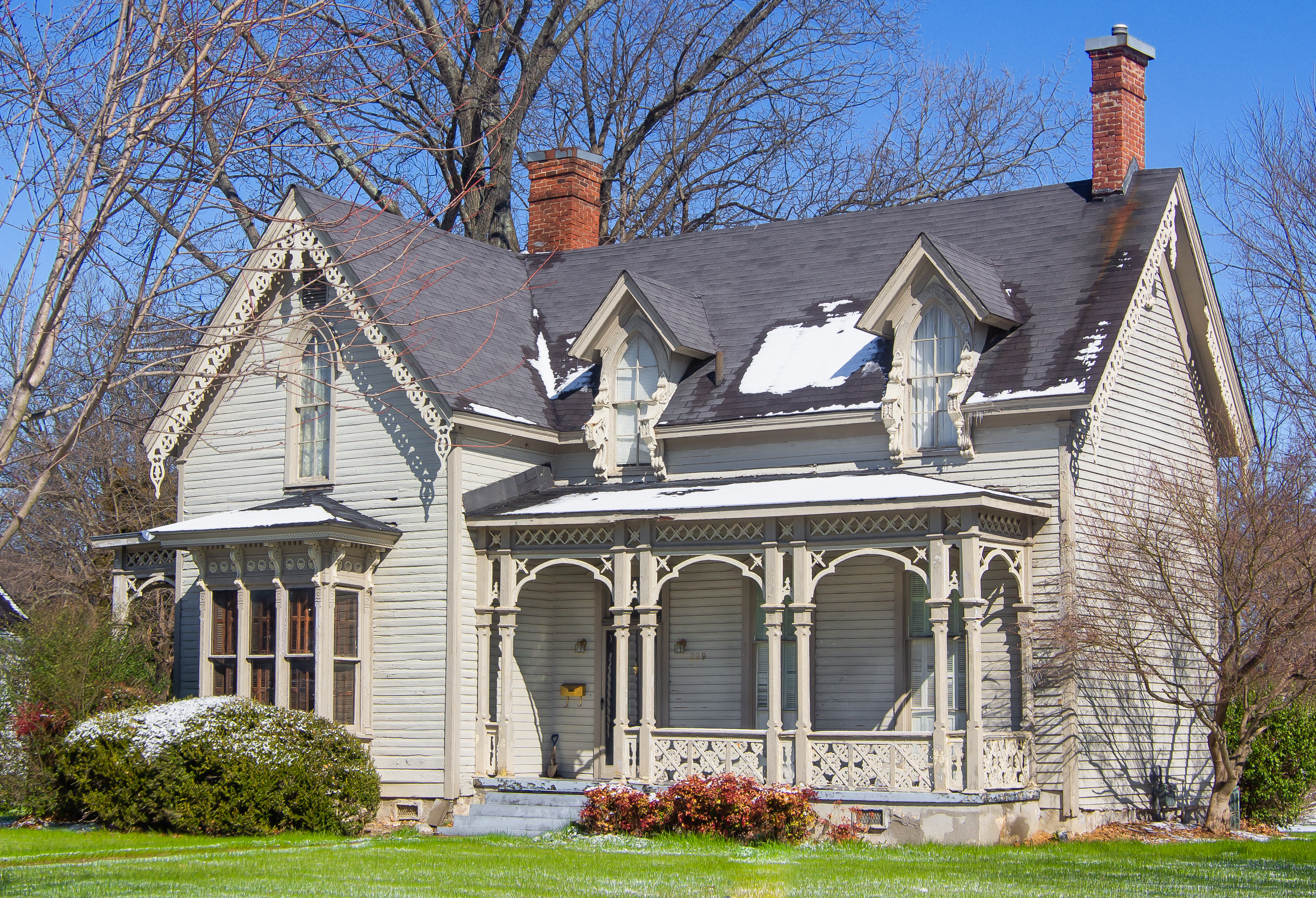

- Location within Tennessee Location within the United States
- Location: 229 University St., Martin, Tennessee
- Coordinates: 36°20′34″N 88°51′24″W
- Area: less than one acre
- Built: 1880
- Architect: Campbell, John
- Architectural style: Carpenter Gothic
- NRHP reference No.: 82004068
- Added to NRHP: March 25, 1982

The W.T. Lawler House is a historic mansion in Martin, Tennessee, USA. It was completed in 1880. It was built for W.T. Lawler, a veteran of the Confederate States Army during the American Civil War and physician. It has been listed on the National Register of Historic Places since March 25, 1982.
