= Elisha White House =

Historic house in Tennessee, United States

- U.S. National Register of Historic Places
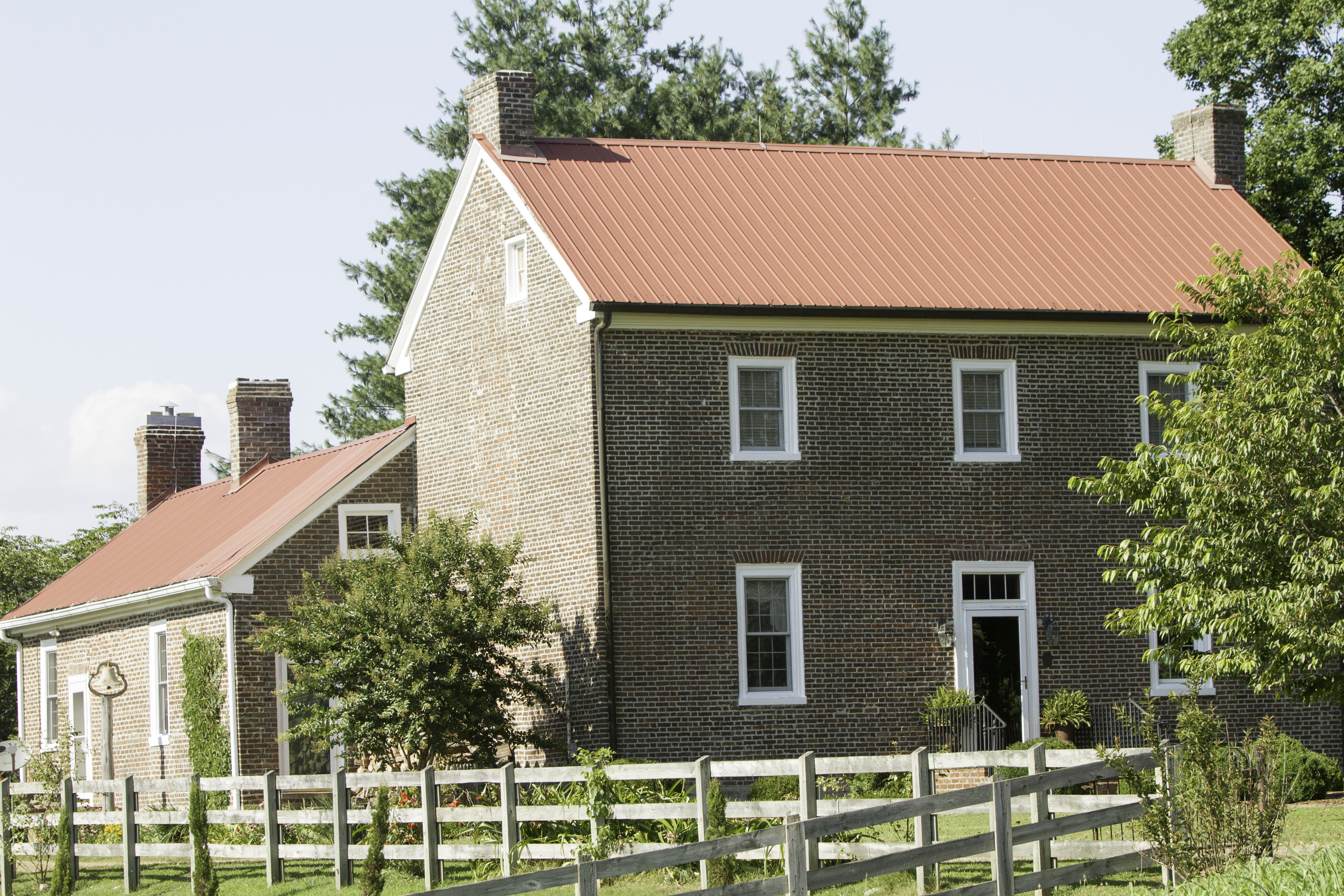
- Elisha White House in 2010

- Location within Tennessee
- Nearest city: Waco, Tennessee
- Coordinates: 35°22′32″N 87°2′9″W
- Area: 0.1 acres (0.040 ha)
- Built: 1821
- Architectural style: Federal
- NRHP reference No.: 83003034
- Added to NRHP: March 4, 1983

The Elisha White House, also known as Maple Tree Farm, is a historic mansion in Waco, Tennessee, U.S..

== History ==
The land was granted to Thomas Armstrong, a veteran of the American Revolutionary War. In 1810, it was purchased by Elisha White, a settler from Virginia. White built the house in 1821, where he lived with his wife Jane. During the American Civil War of 1861–1865, it served as a hospital for the Confederate States Army.

The house has been listed on the National Register of Historic Places since March 4, 1983.
