= Cary Lawn =

Historic house in Tennessee, United States

- U.S. National Register of Historic Places
- Location within Tennessee Location within the United States
- Location: 321 Linden St. Dresden, Tennessee
- Coordinates: 36°17′16″N 88°42′18″W
- Area: 2.6 acres (1.1 ha)
- Built: 1923
- Architectural style: Renaissance, Italian Renaissance
- NRHP reference No.: 92000779
- Added to NRHP: June 18, 1992

Cary Lawn is a historic mansion in Dresden, Tennessee, United States.

== History ==
The mansion was completed in 1923. It was built for Rhea Preston Cary and his wife, Charlie Ewing.

It was purchased by Ned McWherter in 1984. McWherter went on to serve as the 46th Governor of Tennessee from 1987 to 1995.

== Architectural significance ==
It has been listed on the National Register of Historic Places since June 18, 1992.
