= Marshalldale =

Historic house in Tennessee, United States

- U.S. National Register of Historic Places
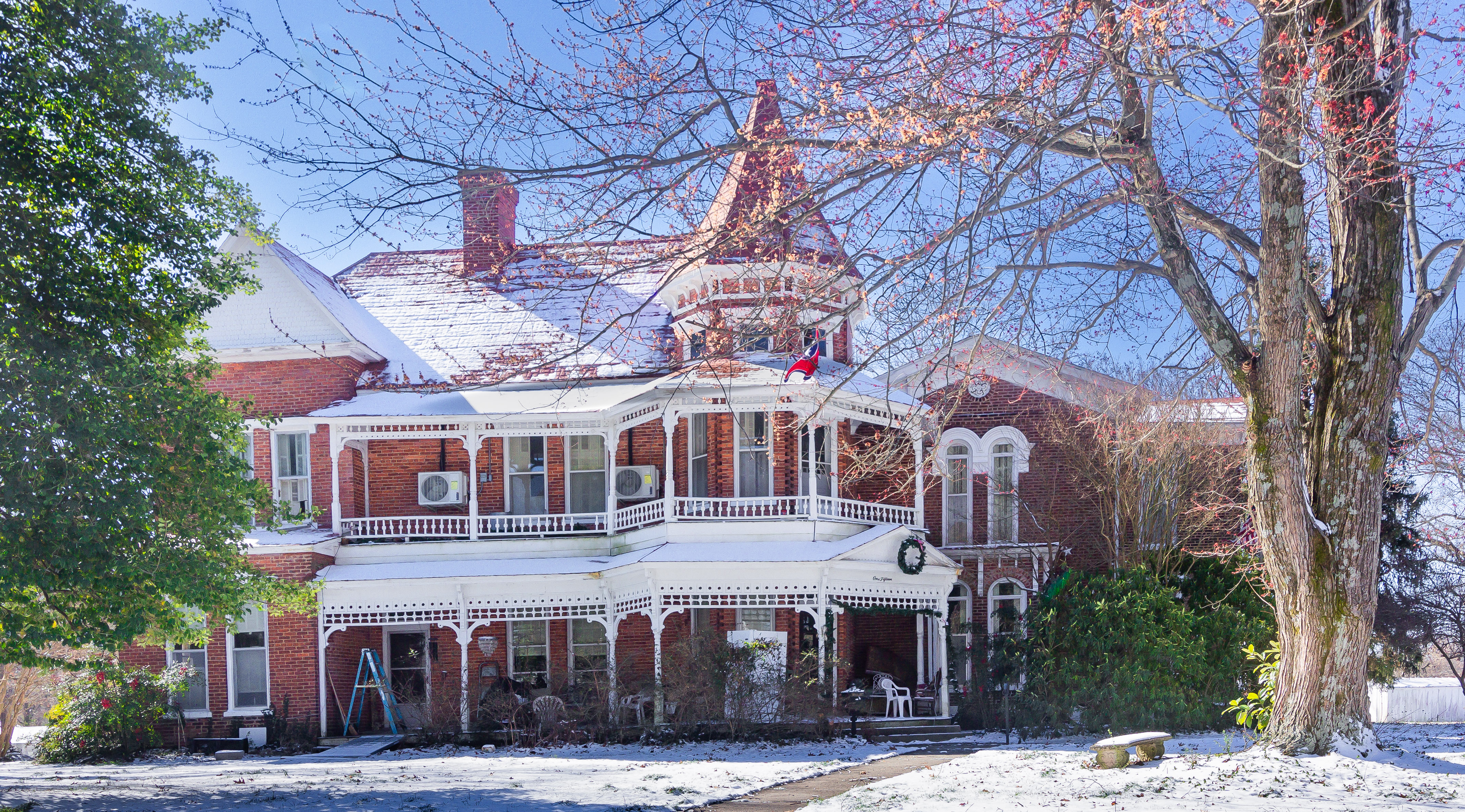

- Location within Tennessee Location within the United States
- Location: 115 Ryan Ave., Martin, Tennessee
- Coordinates: 36°20′12″N 88°50′57″W
- Area: 1.3 acres (0.53 ha)
- Built: 1850
- Built by: Wes Gibbs (1850 house), Edwin Jeffress (1875 addition)
- Architectural style: Italianate, Queen Anne
- NRHP reference No.: 82004069
- Added to NRHP: March 25, 1982

Marshalldale is a historic mansion in Martin, Tennessee, USA.

== History ==
The one-story house was completed in 1850. By 1875. a two-story addition, designed in the Italianate architectural style, was completed. The house was built for Marshall Presley Martin, a tobacco planter.

== Architectural significance ==
It has been listed on the National Register of Historic Places since March 25, 1982.
