= Dr. Benjamin Franklin Smith House =

Historic house in Tennessee, United States

- U.S. National Register of Historic Places
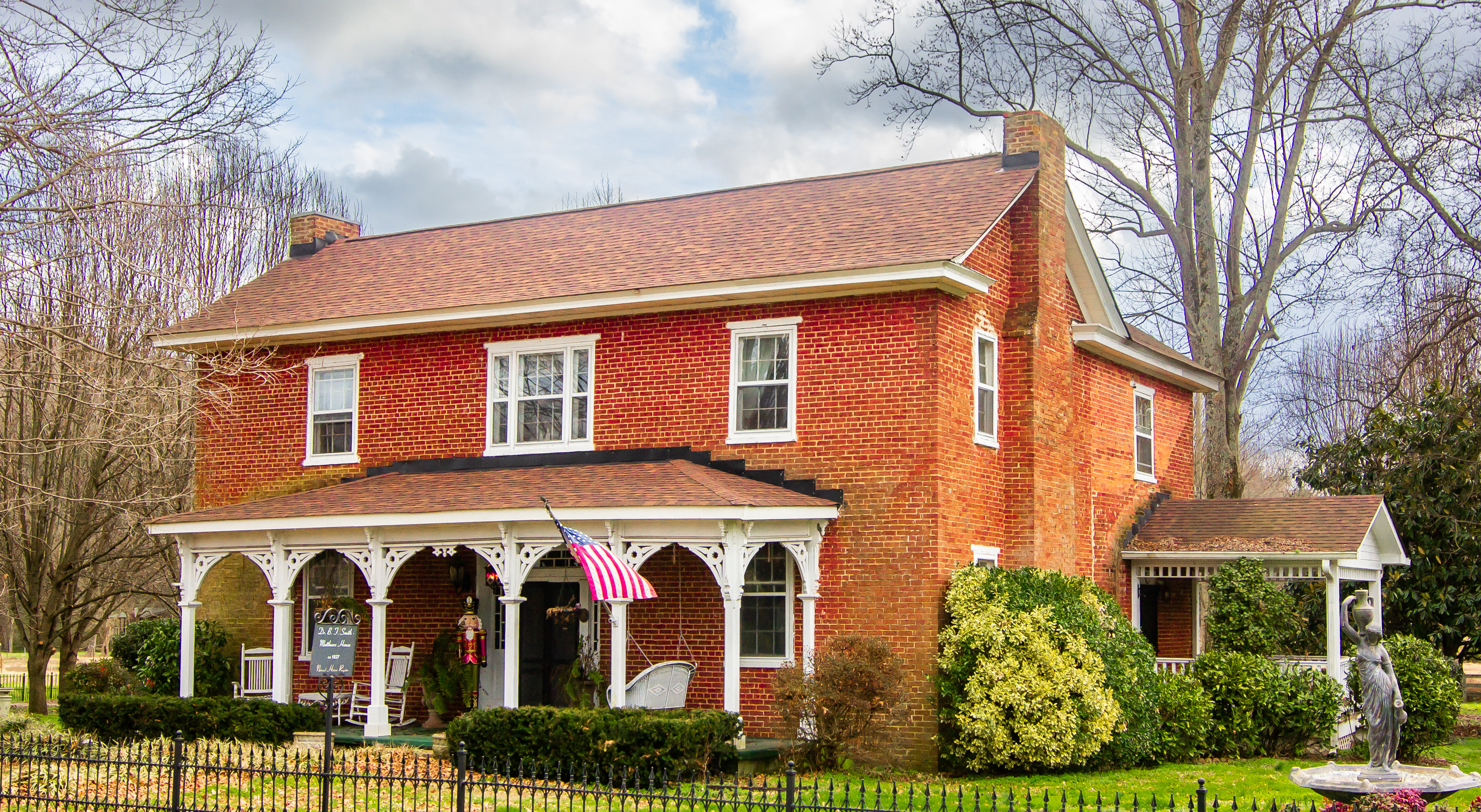

- Location within Tennessee
- Location: 13494 Columbia Hwy., Waco, Tennessee
- Coordinates: 35°22′42″N 87°1′54″W
- Area: 1 acre (0.40 ha)
- Architectural style: Greek Revival, Queen Anne
- NRHP reference No.: 06000728
- Added to NRHP: August 23, 2006

The Dr. Benjamin Franklin Smith House is a historic house in Waco, Tennessee, United States.

== History ==
The house was built in the early 1850s for William M. Hackney, a horse saddler. It was purchased by Dr. Benjamin Frankly Smith in 1855. By 1860, he owned eight slaves. During the American Civil War of 1861–1865, his son William T. Smith served in the Confederate States Army. Meanwhile, Benjamin died at the end of the war, in 1865. The house was subsequently inherited by his descendants until 1938.

The house has been listed on the National Register of Historic Places since August 23, 2006.
