= Wilson-Young House =

Historic house in Tennessee, United States

- U.S. National Register of Historic Places
- Location within Tennessee
- Nearest city: Dellrose, Tennessee
- Coordinates: 35°5′45″N 86°50′19″W
- Area: 5 acres (2.0 ha)
- Built: 1850
- Architectural style: Federal
- NRHP reference No.: 73001766
- Added to NRHP: April 13, 1973

The Wilson-Young House is a historic mansion near Dellrose in Giles County, Tennessee. It was built in 1850 for Andrew Madison Wilson. It was designed in the Federal architectural style. It has been listed on the National Register of Historic Places since April 13, 1973.
