= Ivandale =

Historic house in Tennessee, United States

- U.S. National Register of Historic Places
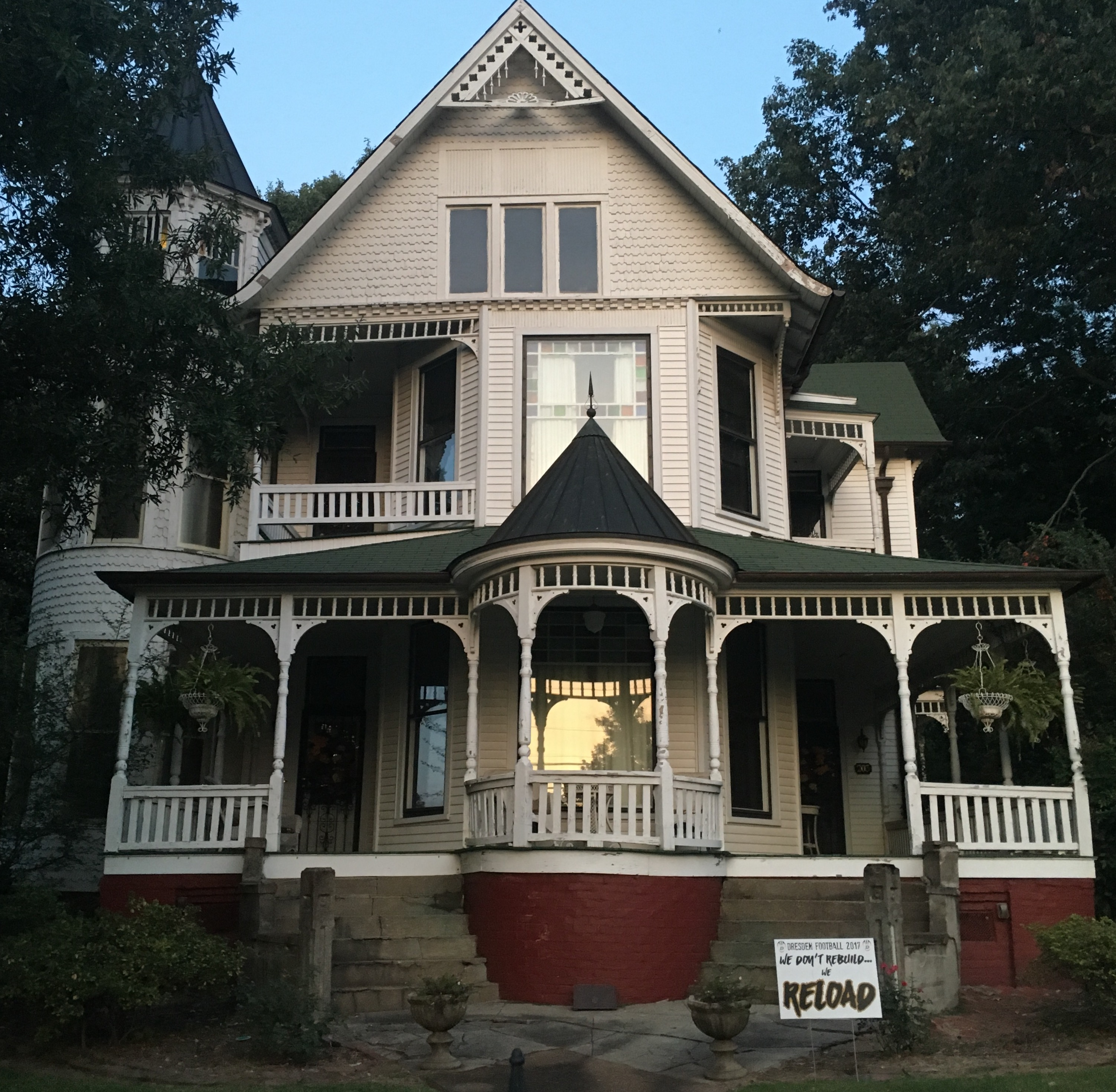

- Location within Tennessee Location within the United States
- Location: 115 N. McCombs St., Martin, Tennessee
- Coordinates: 36°20′38″N 88°50′49″W
- Area: less than one acre
- Built: 1894
- Architect: Vowell Brothers Construction
- Architectural style: Queen Anne
- NRHP reference No.: 82004067
- Added to NRHP: March 25, 1982

Ivandale is a historic mansion in Martin, Tennessee, USA.

== History ==
The mansion was completed in 1894. It was designed in the Queen Anne architectural style. It was built for Dr Charles Moore Sebastian, a physician who treated patients with yellow fever in 1878. The house was built on the ashes of his former mansion (designed in the Greek Revival architectural style), which had burned down earlier in 1894.

The mansion was purchased by Thomad Dodd in 1968.

== Architectural significance ==
It has been listed on the National Register of Historic Places since March 25, 1982.
