= Dr. Robert W. Bandy House =

Historic house in Tennessee, United States

- U.S. National Register of Historic Places
- Location within Tennessee Location within the United States
- Location: College St., Gleason, Tennessee
- Coordinates: 36°12′45″N 88°36′48″W
- Area: less than one acre
- Built: 1907
- Architectural style: Four Square
- NRHP reference No.: 84003726
- Added to NRHP: August 9, 1984

The Dr. Robert W. Bandy House is a historic house in Gleason, Tennessee, USA.

== History ==
The two-story brick house was completed in 1907. It was designed in the American Foursquare architectural style. It was built for Dr Robert W. Bandy, a physician and businessman. The house was purchased by Robert Jeter, a surgeon, in 1941.

== Architectural significance ==
It has been listed on the National Register of Historic Places since August 9, 1984.
