= Wilkerson Place =

Historic house in Tennessee, United States

- U.S. National Register of Historic Places
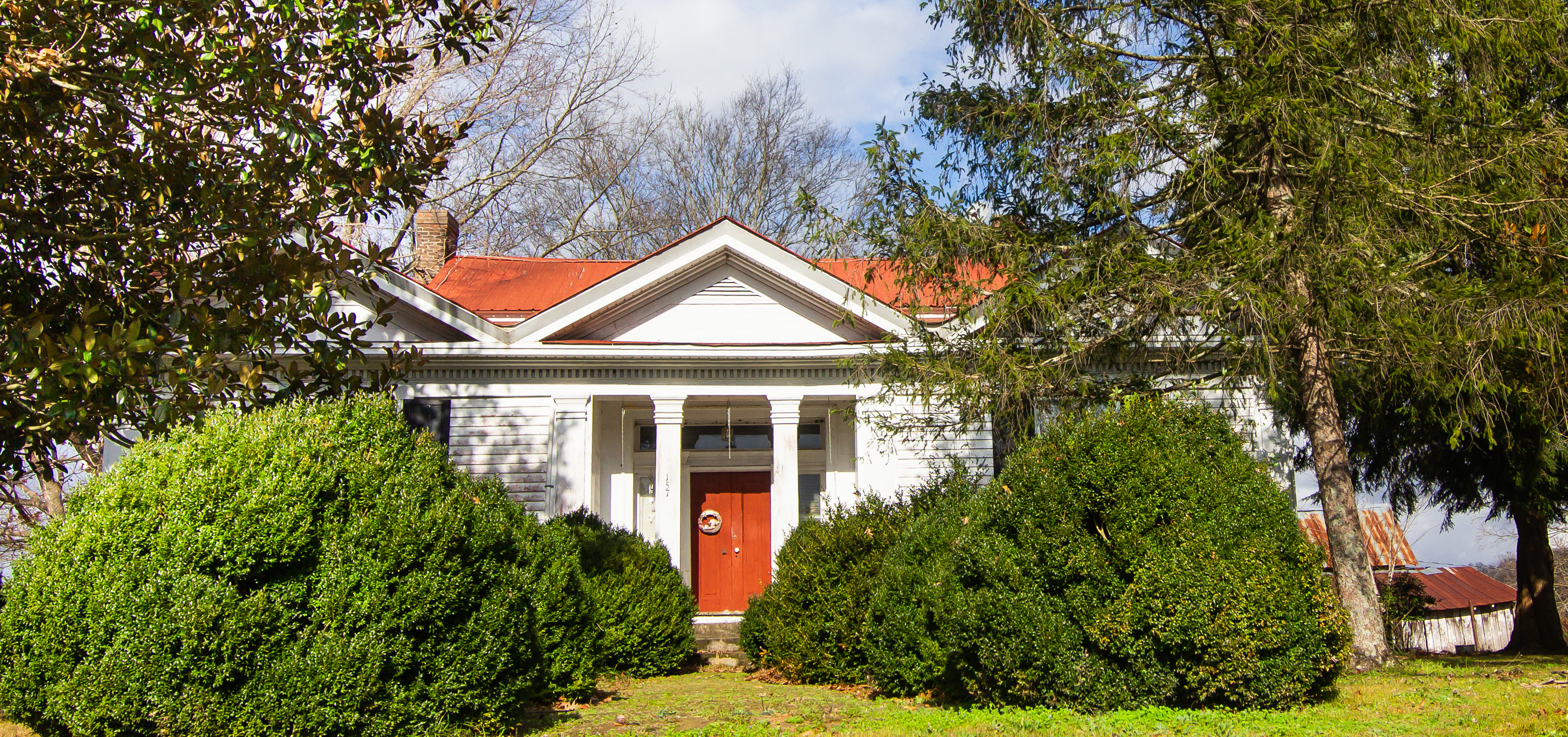

- Location within Tennessee
- Location: 300 Gunter Smith Rd.
- Nearest city: Wales, Tennessee
- Coordinates: 35°17′56″N 87°4′51″W
- Area: 1 acre (0.40 ha)
- Built: 1830
- Architectural style: Greek Revival, Federal, Vernacular Federal
- NRHP reference No.: 86002899
- Added to NRHP: October 23, 1986

Wilkerson Place is a historic house in Giles County, Tennessee, U.S.. It was built in the 1830s. By 1847, it belonged to Allen Wilkerson, a settler from North Carolina. The porch was built in 1857. It has been listed on the National Register of Historic Places since October 23, 1986.
