= Copeland Whitfield House =

Historic house in Tennessee, United States

- U.S. National Register of Historic Places
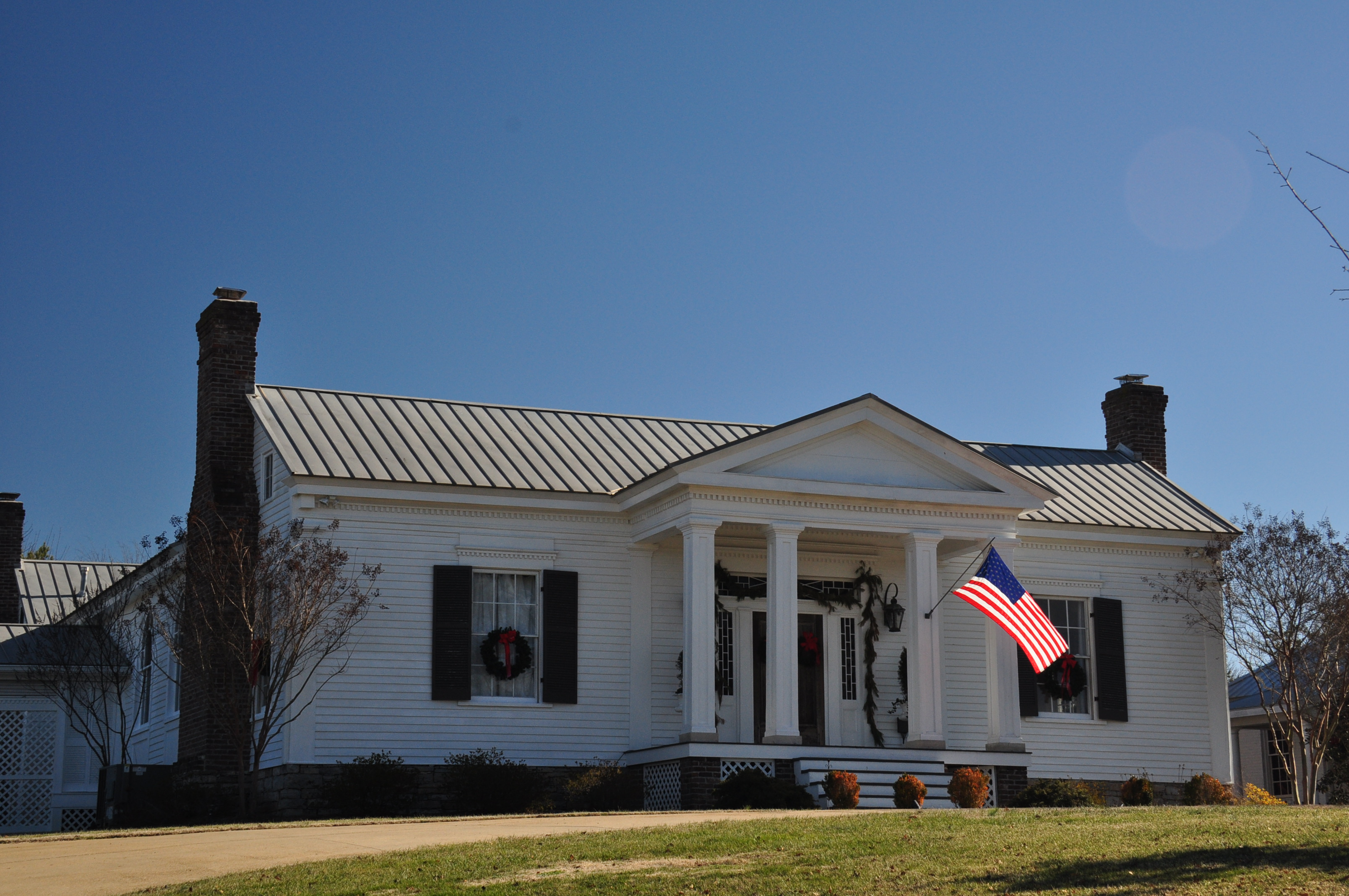
- The Copland Whitfield House in 2015

- Location within Tennessee
- Nearest city: Pulaski, Tennessee
- Coordinates: 35°10′21″N 87°0′59″W
- Area: 2 acres (0.81 ha)
- Built: 1835
- Architectural style: Greek Revival
- NRHP reference No.: 88001021
- Added to NRHP: July 7, 1988

The Copeland-Whitfield House is a historic mansion in Pulaski, Tennessee, U.S..

== History ==
The house was built as a log house in the 1830s for Copeland Whitfield, a settler and slaveholder from Virginia. Whitfield lived in the house with his first wife, Susan Harwell, and later with his second wife, Nancy Adell Butler. By 1847, the house was redesigned in the Greek Revival architectural style.

During the American Civil War of 1861–1865, Whitfield was hanged by members of the Union Army, but he survived. After his 1891 death, his widow lived in the house until 1904. Their son, Copeland George Whitfield, lived in the house with his wife, Ella May Cardin, until his death in 1946; his widow lived here until 1980. It was inherited by members of the same family.

The house has been listed on the National Register of Historic Places since July 7, 1988.
