= Clifton Place (Wales, Tennessee) =

Historic house in Tennessee, United States

- U.S. National Register of Historic Places
- Location within Tennessee
- Location: Campbellsville Rd., Wales, Tennessee
- Coordinates: 35°16′5″N 87°4′24″W
- Area: 9 acres (3.6 ha)
- Built: 1812
- NRHP reference No.: 73001767
- Added to NRHP: April 11, 1973

Clifton Place is a historic mansion on a former plantation in Giles County, Tennessee, United States. It was built in 1812 for Tyree Rodes, Sr. The plantation had slaves. It has been listed on the National Register of Historic Places since April 11, 1973.
