= Bethany Presbyterian Church Complex =

Historic church in Tennessee, United States

- Formerly listed on the U.S. National Register of Historic Places
- Location within Tennessee Location within the United States
- Location: Elkton Road, vicinity of Bryson, Tennessee
- Coordinates: 35°5′51″N 86°51′39″W
- Area: 13.5 acres (5.5 ha)
- Built: 1853, 1858, 1887
- Architectural style: Greek Revival
- NRHP reference No.: 89001968

Significant dates
- Added to NRHP: November 13, 1989
- Removed from NRHP: March 27, 2020

The Bethany Presbyterian Church Complex in Giles County, Tennessee was listed on the National Register of Historic Places in 1989.

The complex includes the Bethany Presbyterian Church (1853), the Bethany Academy (1858), and the Bethany Church Manse (1887). The church "is an excellent local example of antebellum Greek Revival chapel architecture. The academy is the oldest educational building in Giles County.

The site was removed from the National Register in 2020.
