= Olivet United Methodist Church, Parsonage and School =

Historic church in Tennessee, United States

- U.S. National Register of Historic Places
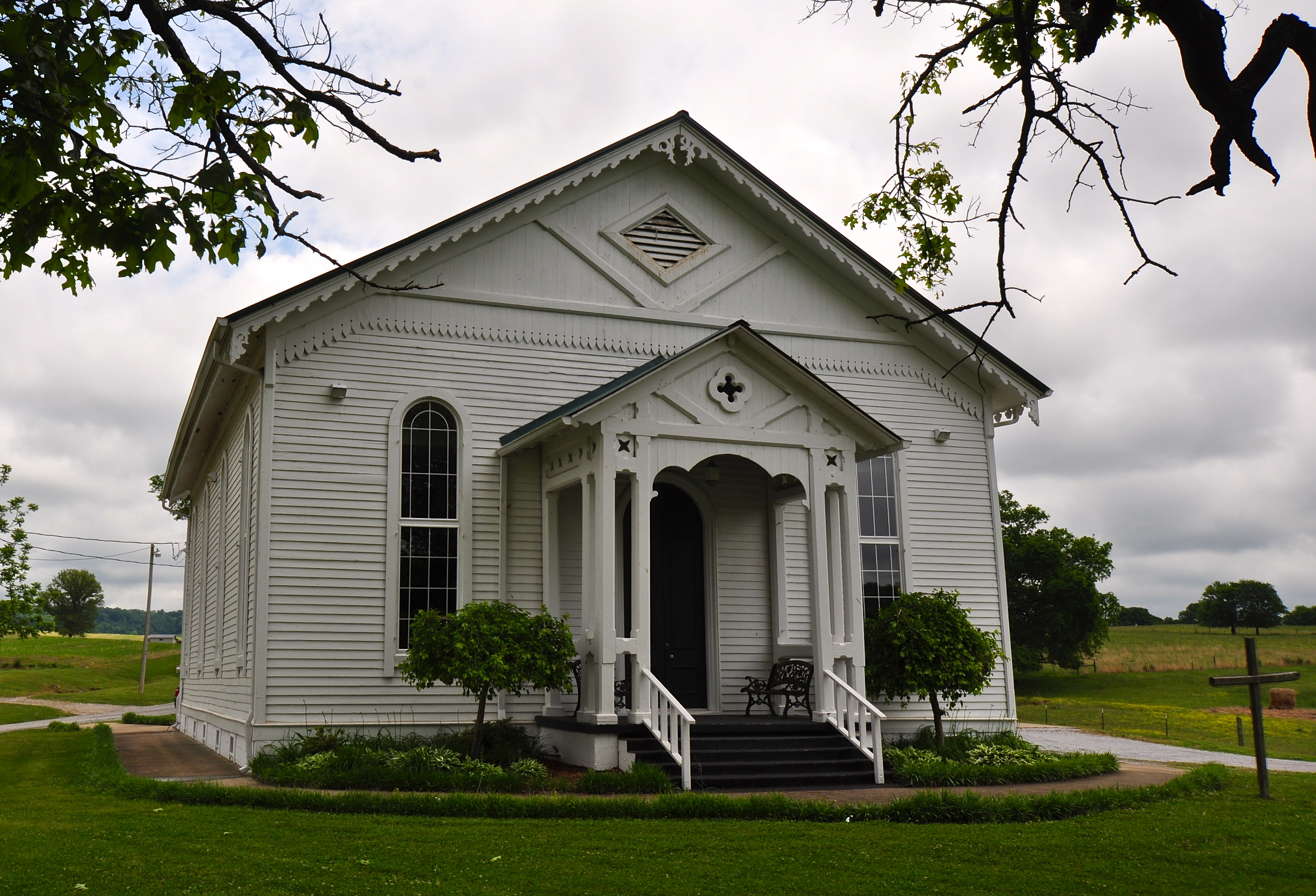
- Olivet United Methodist Church, Parsonage and School, May 2014.

- Location within Tennessee Location within the United States
- Nearest city: Riversburg, Tennessee
- Coordinates: 35°17′39″N 87°01′35″W
- Area: 3.5 acres (1.4 ha)
- Built: 1871
- Architectural style: Late Victorian, Victorian vernacular
- Website: www.nationalregisterofhistoricplaces.com/tn/giles/state.html
- NRHP reference No.: 84003538
- Added to NRHP: July 19, 1984

Olivet United Methodist Church, Parsonage and School is a historic church in the vicinity of Riversburg, Tennessee in Giles County.

It was built in 1871 and added to the National Register in 1984.
