= Bass Building (Tonopah, Nevada) =

- U.S. National Register of Historic Places
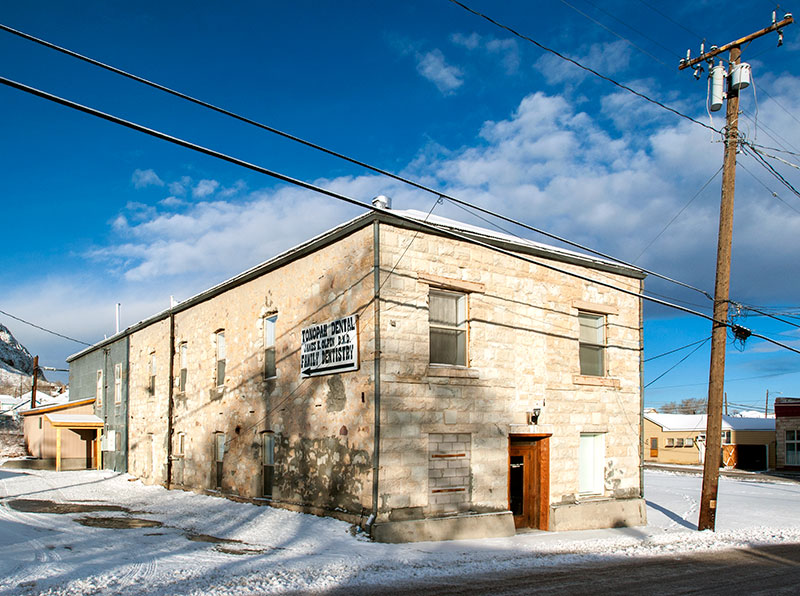

- Location within Nevada Location within the United States
- Location: 119 St. Patrick, Tonopah, Nevada
- Coordinates: 38.067571°N 117.231553°W
- Area: less than one acre
- Built: 1904
- MPS: Tonopah MRA
- NRHP reference No.: 82003216
- Added to NRHP: May 20, 1982

The Bass Building is a historic building located at 119 St. Patrick in Tonopah, Nevada. Built in 1904, the building is the third-oldest stone commercial building in Tonopah. The building has a simple stone design reflective of a transitional period between rustic and well-crafted stone buildings. A. A. Bass built the structure as a lodging house; it later served as offices for a telephone company and as a fraternal lodge. A 1912 fire gutted the building's interior, but Bass rebuilt it the following year.

The building was added to the National Register of Historic Places on May 20, 1982.
