= Reveille (Pulaski, Tennessee) =

Historic house in Tennessee, United States

- U.S. National Register of Historic Places
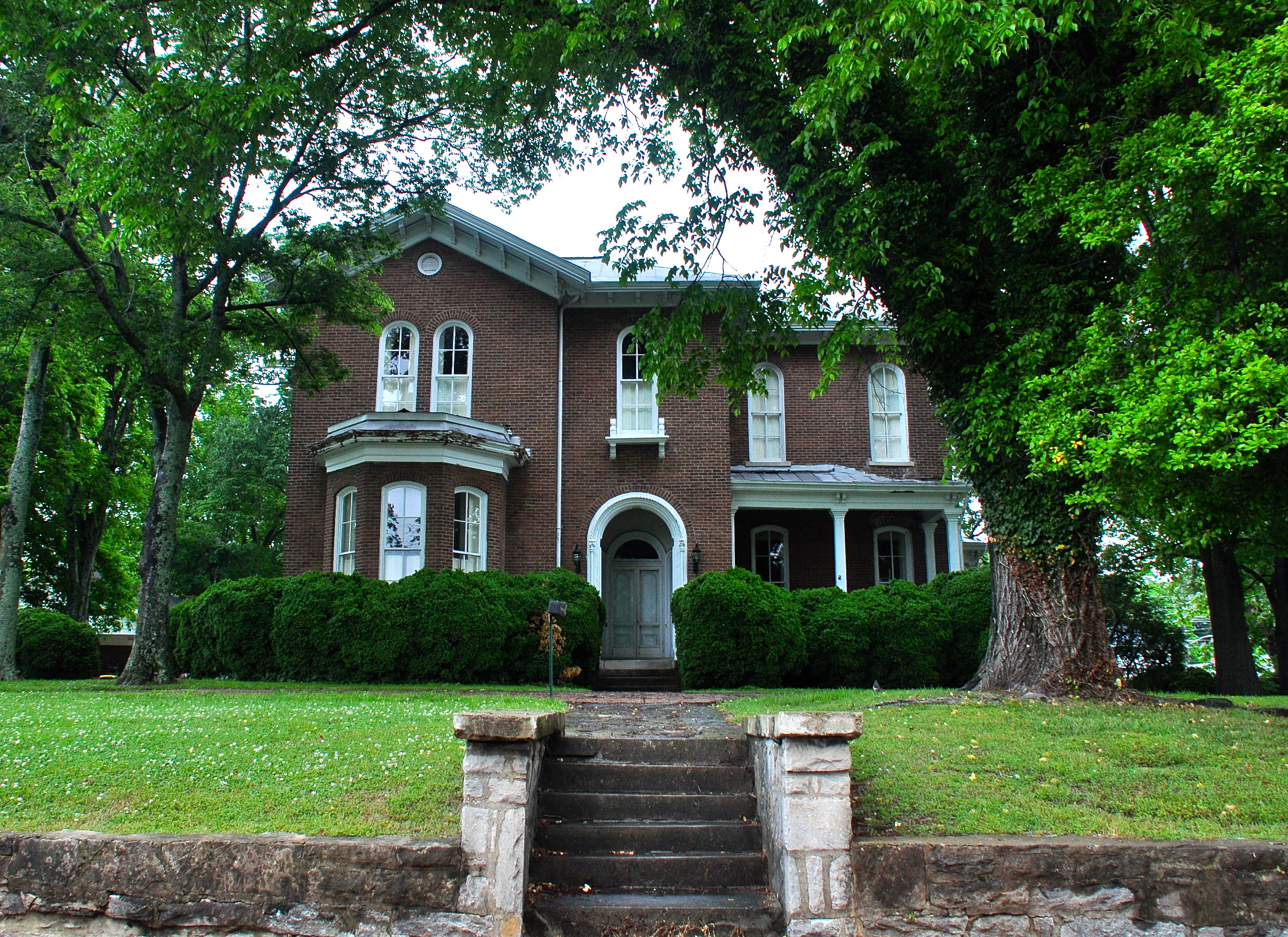
- Reveille in 2014

- Location within Tennessee
- Location: 408 W. Madison, Pulaski, Tennessee
- Coordinates: 35°12′1″N 87°2′4″W
- Area: 1.5 acres (0.61 ha)
- Built: 1868
- Built by: Burns, Phil; Purcell, Jine
- Architectural style: Italianate
- NRHP reference No.: 94001273
- Added to NRHP: October 28, 1994

Reveille is a historic mansion in Pulaski, Tennessee. It was built in 1868 for Benjamin Franklin Carter, a veteran of the Confederate States Army. It was designed in the Italianate architectural style. It has been listed on the National Register of Historic Places since October 28, 1994.
