= Capt. William Sims House =

Historic house in Tennessee, United States

- U.S. National Register of Historic Places
- Location within Tennessee Location within the United States
- Nearest city: Greenfield, Tennessee
- Coordinates: 36°12′13″N 88°42′26″W
- Area: 3.5 acres (1.4 ha)
- Built: 1859
- Architectural style: Greek Revival
- NRHP reference No.: 82004066
- Added to NRHP: March 25, 1982

The Capt. William Sims House is a historic mansion in Greenfield, Tennessee, United States.

== History ==
The two-story mansion was completed in 1861. It was designed in the Greek Revival architectural style. An additional ell was completed in 1880. It was built for William Sims, who served as a captain in the Confederate States Army during the American Civil War. In the 1980s, the house still belonged to his descendants.

== Architectural significance ==
It has been listed on the National Register of Historic Places since March 25, 1982.
