= Wilkinson-Martin House =

Historic house in Tennessee, United States

- U.S. National Register of Historic Places
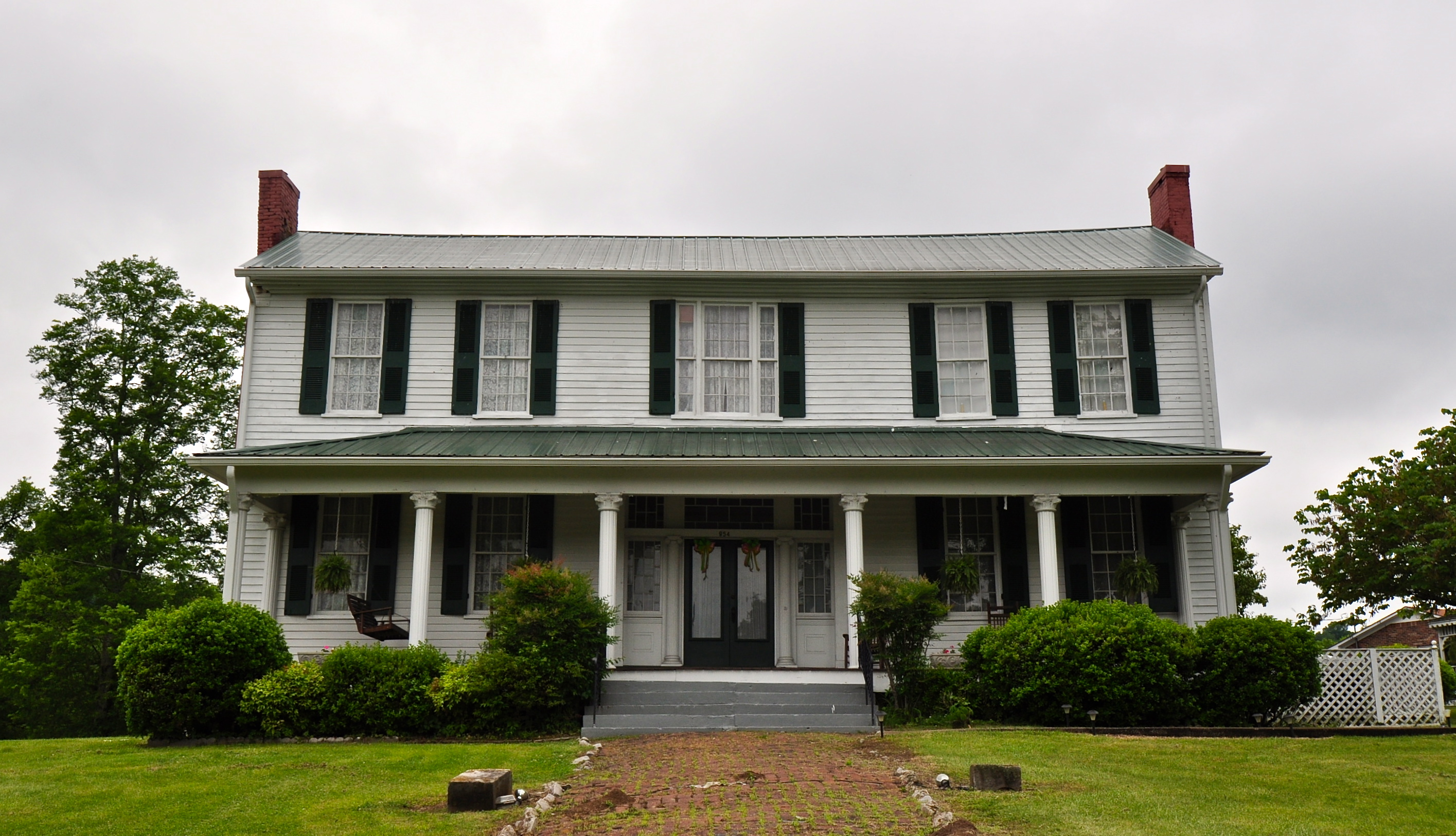
- Wilkinson-Martin House, May 2014.

- Location within Tennessee Location within the United States
- Interactive map showing the location of Wilkinson-Martin House
- Location: 954 North 1st Street, Pulaski, Tennessee
- Coordinates: 35°12′34.11″N 87°1′38.08″W
- Area: 2 acres (0.81 ha)
- NRHP reference No.: 10000085
- Added to NRHP: March 17, 2010

The Wilkinson-Martin House, also known as the Sims House, is a historic Federal style house at 954 North 1st Street in Pulaski, Tennessee. The house was built between 1830 and 1835. It is the oldest Federal style house and one of the oldest houses of any style surviving in Pulaski.

The Federal style developed and was widely employed in the north and east of the United States during the period 1785 to 1815. It reached and persisted in the south and west later, up to 1830. When this house was built the style was "definitely on the wane" but it "suited the tastes" of Wilkinson, a transplanted Virginian. The house is one of the last-built Federal houses in the area; at the time of its construction, the prevailing style had become Greek Revival.

Construction of the house included the use of slave labor.

Federal style applies to the inside as well as the exterior of the house.

The house was later home to Wilkinson's daughter and her husband David Martin, who twice served as mayor of Pulaski while living in the home.

The house remained in one family for 130 years. The Wilkinson family was one of the earliest white settler families in Giles County, having moved there in 1809, the year the county was established.

During the American Civil War, Pulaski was occupied by the Union Army from 1862 on. After the war ended, freed blacks began settling near the Wilkinson-Martin house, in the northwest section of Pulaski. The house retained its rural character, however.

It is now used as a community activities center.

The building was listed on the National Register of Historic Places on March 17, 2010. The listing was announced as the featured listing in the National Park Service's weekly list of March 26, 2010.

It is located on a hill across from the historic Bridgeforth High School, a black institution which is also listed on the National Register.

A gazebo and a wishing well on the property are modern, non-contributing structures.
