= Bass Mansion =

Bass Mansion may refer to:

- John H. Bass Mansion, Fort Wayne, Indiana, listed on the National Register of Historic Places (NRHP)
- Bass Mansion (Stevensville, Montana), listed on the NRHP in Ravalli County, Montana

== See also ==
- Bass House (disambiguation)
