= Abernathy Farm =

Historic house in Tennessee, United States

- U.S. National Register of Historic Places
- U.S. Historic district
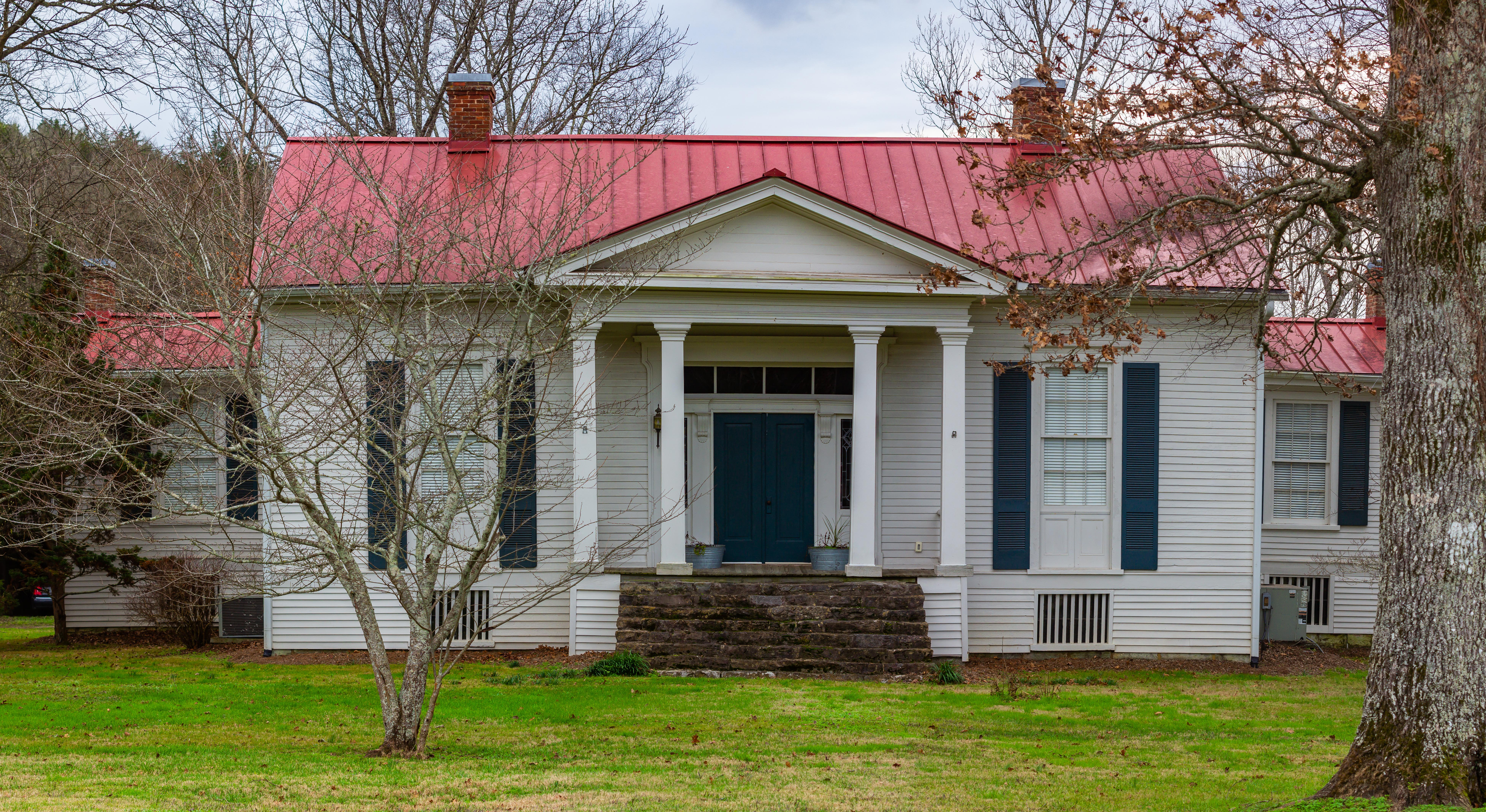
- The farmhouse in 2022

- Location within Tennessee Location within the United States
- Location: 9441 Elkton Pike, Conway, Tennessee
- Nearest city: Elkton, Tennessee
- Coordinates: 35.0975°N 86.9589°W
- Area: 161.2 acres (65.2 ha)
- Built: 1855
- Architectural style: Greek Revival
- MPS: Historic Family Farms in Middle Tennessee MPS
- NRHP reference No.: 01000393
- Added to NRHP: April 19, 2001

The Abernathy Farm is a historic farmhouse in Giles County, Tennessee. It was built in 1855 for Burwell Abernathy II and his wife, Samuella Dewees Tannehill. It has been listed on the National Register of Historic Places since April 19, 2001.
