= Bass–Perry House =

Historic house in Alabama, United States

- Bass-Perry House
- U.S. National Register of Historic Places
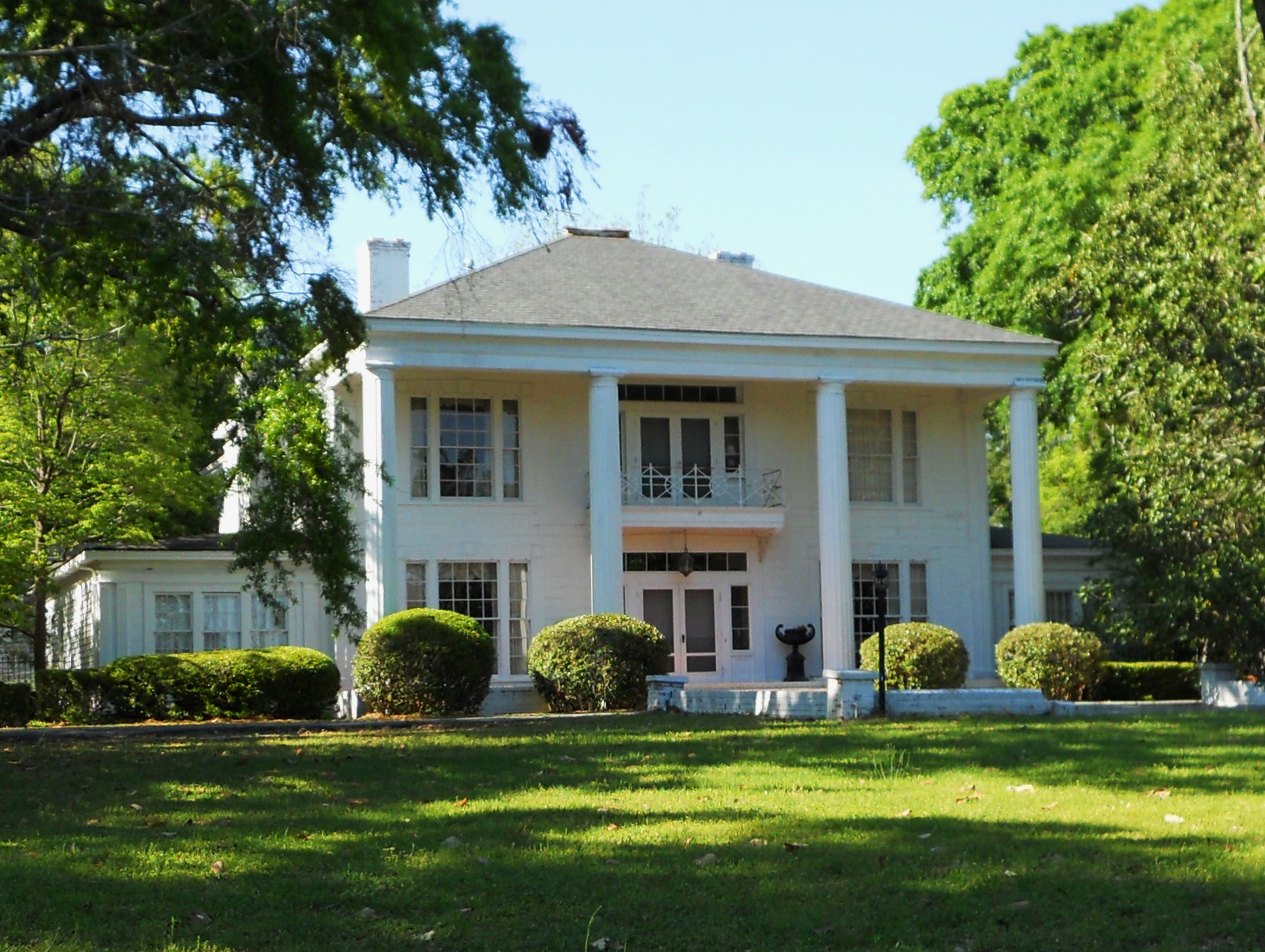
- The Bass-Perry House in 2011

- Location within Alabama Location within the United States
- Nearest city: Seale, Alabama
- Coordinates: 32°20′46″N 85°7′57″W
- Area: 8 acres (3.2 ha)
- Built: 1840
- Architectural style: Greek Revival
- NRHP reference No.: 76000355
- Added to NRHP: January 19, 1976

The Bass-Perry House is a historic plantation house in Seale, Alabama, U.S.

The house was built between 1840 and 1844 for Hartwell Bass, who came from Virginia and used the forced labor of enslaved people to grow cotton on a large farm. Bass was a trustee of the Good Hope Male and Female Academy. It was designed in the Greek Revival architectural style. When Bass died in the early 1840s, it was inherited by his widow, Elizabeth, and her son-in-law, Patrick Henry Perry. The house remained in the family until 1939.

The house was owned by Hillary Mott from 1939 to 1968. Mott was the president and later chairman of the Nehi Corporation as well as the director of the Southern Industrial Council based in Nashville, Tennessee. By 1968, he sold the house to Roy Greene.

It has been listed on the National Register of Historic Places since January 19, 1976.
