= Pisgah United Methodist Church and Cemetery =

Historic site in Giles County, Tennessee, US

- U.S. National Register of Historic Places
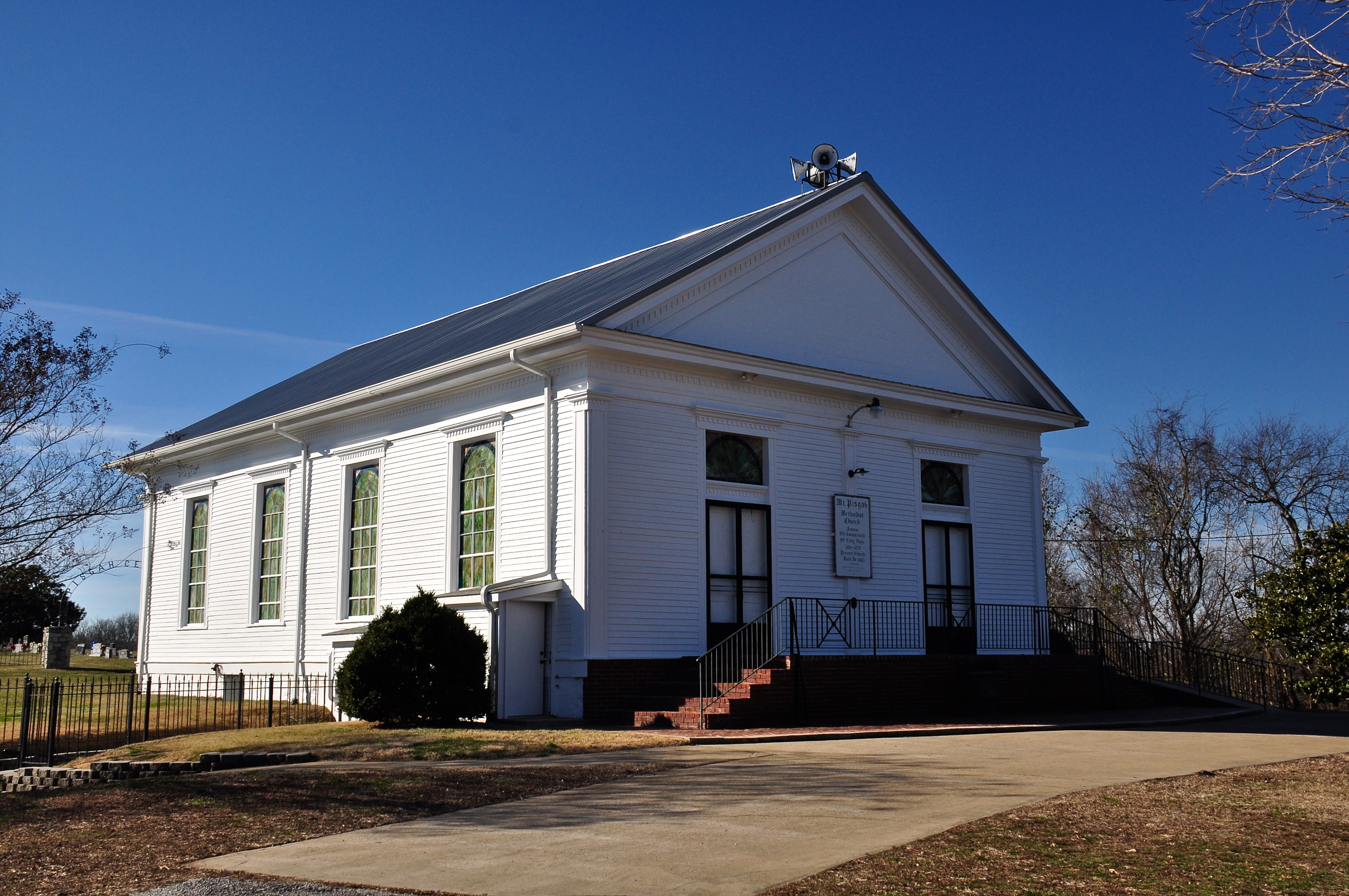
- Pisgah United Methodist Church, January 2015.

- Location within Tennessee Location within the United States
- Nearest city: Pisgah, Tennessee
- Coordinates: 35°10′46″N 86°54′43″W
- Area: 6.6 acres (2.7 ha)
- Built: 1867
- Architect: Edwards, James M.; Hollis, William C.
- Architectural style: Greek Revival
- NRHP reference No.: 84000330
- Added to NRHP: November 23, 1984

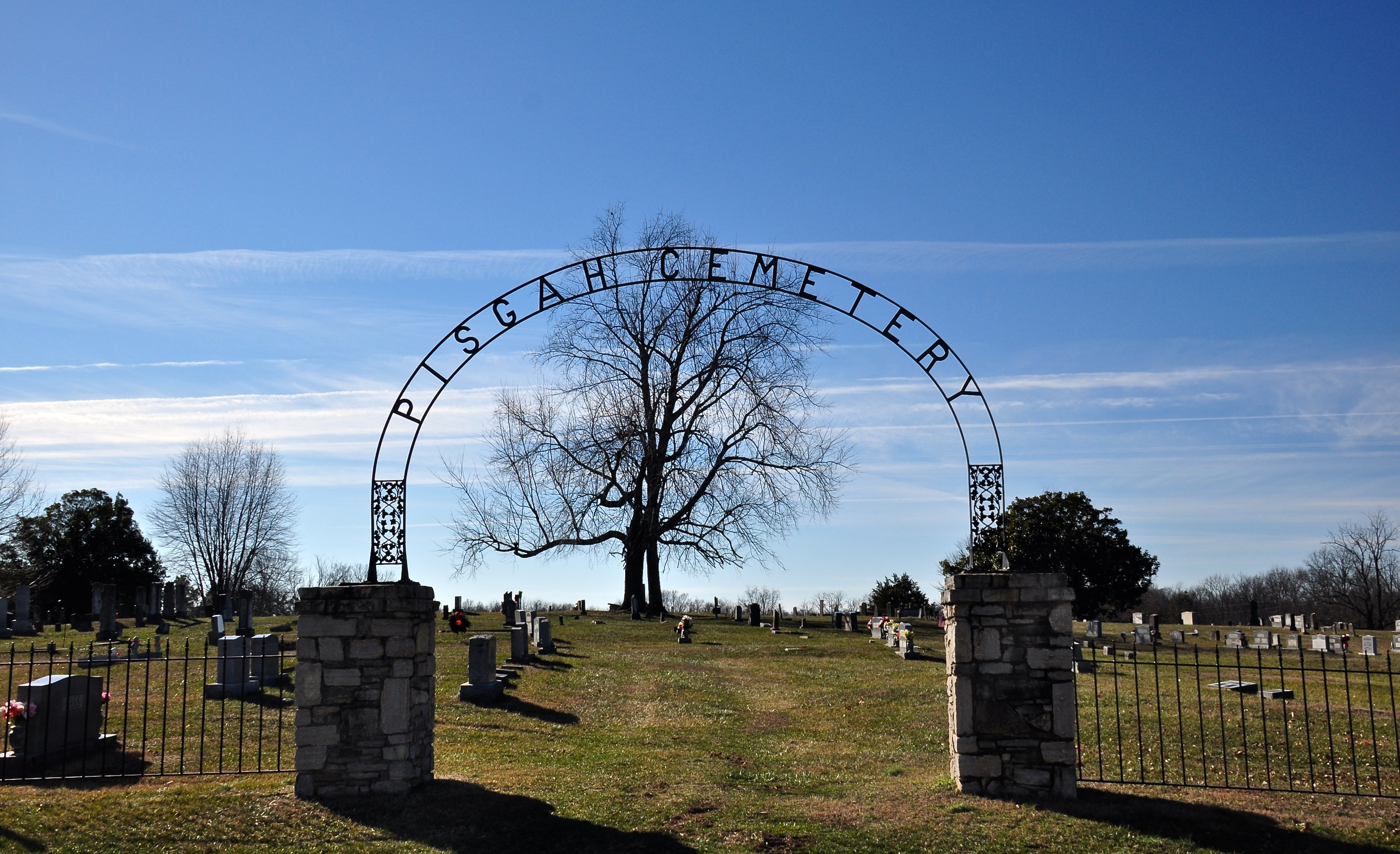
Pisgah Cemetery is located behind Pisgah United Methodist Church.

Pisgah United Methodist Church and Cemetery is a historic church in Pisgah, Tennessee. It was built in 1867 and added to the National Register in 1984.
