= Lillard Mill, Tennessee =

Tennessee extinct town

Coordinates: 35°35′12″N 86°47′05″W

Lillard Mill is an extinct town in Marshall County, in the U.S. state of Tennessee. The GNIS classifies it as a populated place.

== History ==
A variant name was "Lillards Mills". The community once had Lilliard's Mill, a gristmill. A post office called Lillard's Mill was established in 1866, and remained in operation until 1914.
