= Varsity Theatre (Martin, Tennessee) =

- U.S. National Register of Historic Places
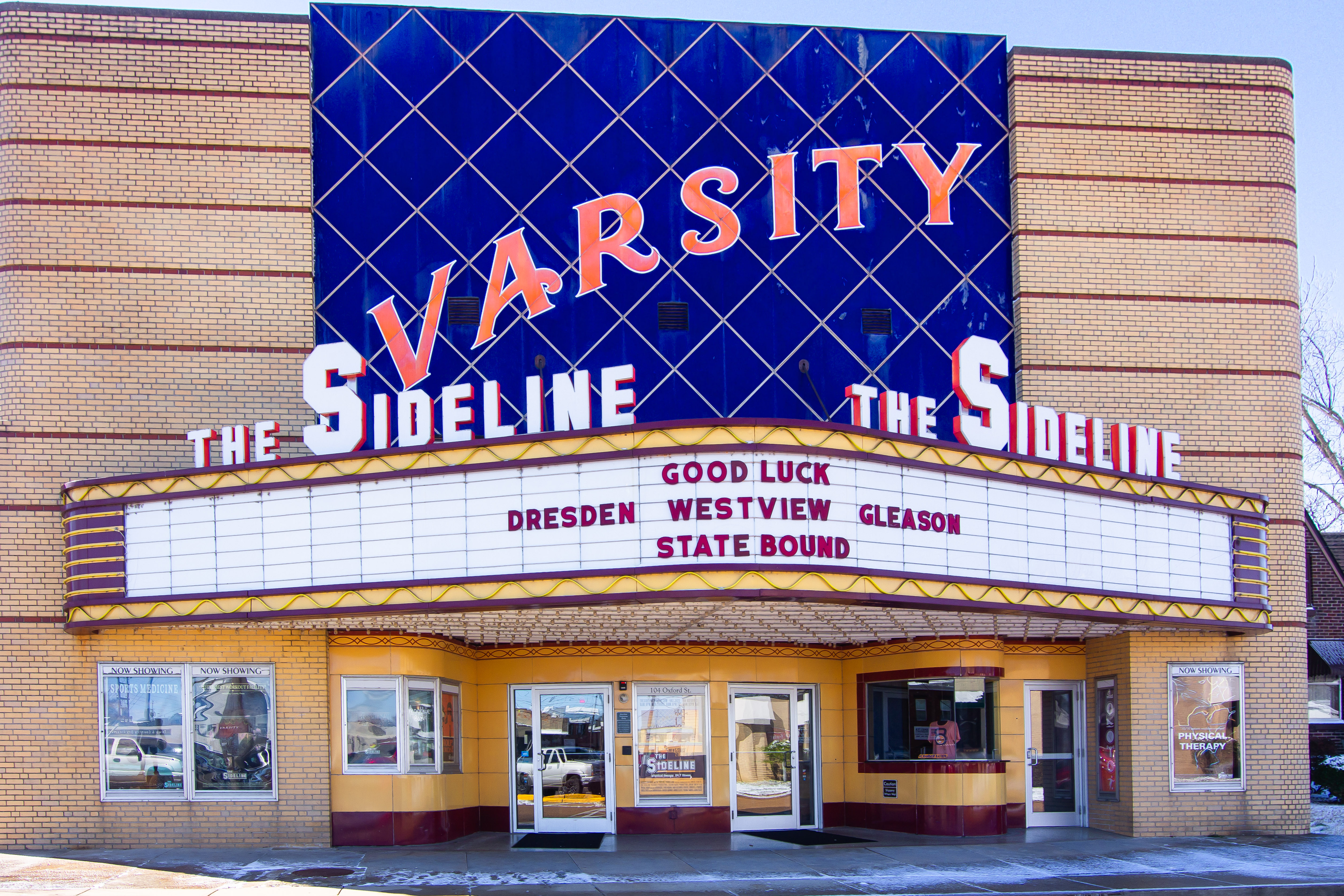

- Location within Tennessee Location within the United States
- Location: 104 Oxford St, Martin, Tennessee
- Coordinates: 36°20′36″N 88°51′05″W
- Area: less than one acre
- Architect: Speight and Hibbs
- Architectural style: Streamline Moderne, Art Deco
- NRHP reference No.: 10000464
- Added to NRHP: June 1, 2010

The Varsity Theatre is a historic movie theater in Martin, Tennessee, USA. The building is listed on the National Register of Historic Places.

Varsity Theatre was built in 1949 for the Ruffin Amusement Company of Covington, Tennessee. When it opened on August 10 of that same year, it was the premier movie house in Martin and Weakley County, seating 1,000 people in its air-conditioned interior. The name "varsity" was chosen in recognition of the University of Tennessee College in Martin.

The building design, by the architecture firm Speight and Hibbs of Clarksville, Tennessee, incorporates elements of the Art Deco and Art Moderne styles. The exterior of the building has the streamlined appearance that characterizes Art Moderne design, including extensive use of rounded edges and horizontal lines. Art Moderne elements are also present in the interior, along with Art Deco-style lighting and wall decor. Built in the Jim Crow era, the building design provided segregated facilities for African-American moviegoers, who used a separate entrance door to get to the theater balcony and to segregated bathrooms and a drinking fountain located in the stairwell.

The theater operated until 1987, then closed for several years because of its owner's health problems. It reopened in 1992, but closed in 1996, when the building was taken over for use as a church. The church moved out in 2002, and the building stood empty for several years before being converted to its current use as a fitness center and physical therapy clinic. It was listed on the National Register of Historic Places in August 2010.
