= Bridgeforth High School =

- U.S. National Register of Historic Places
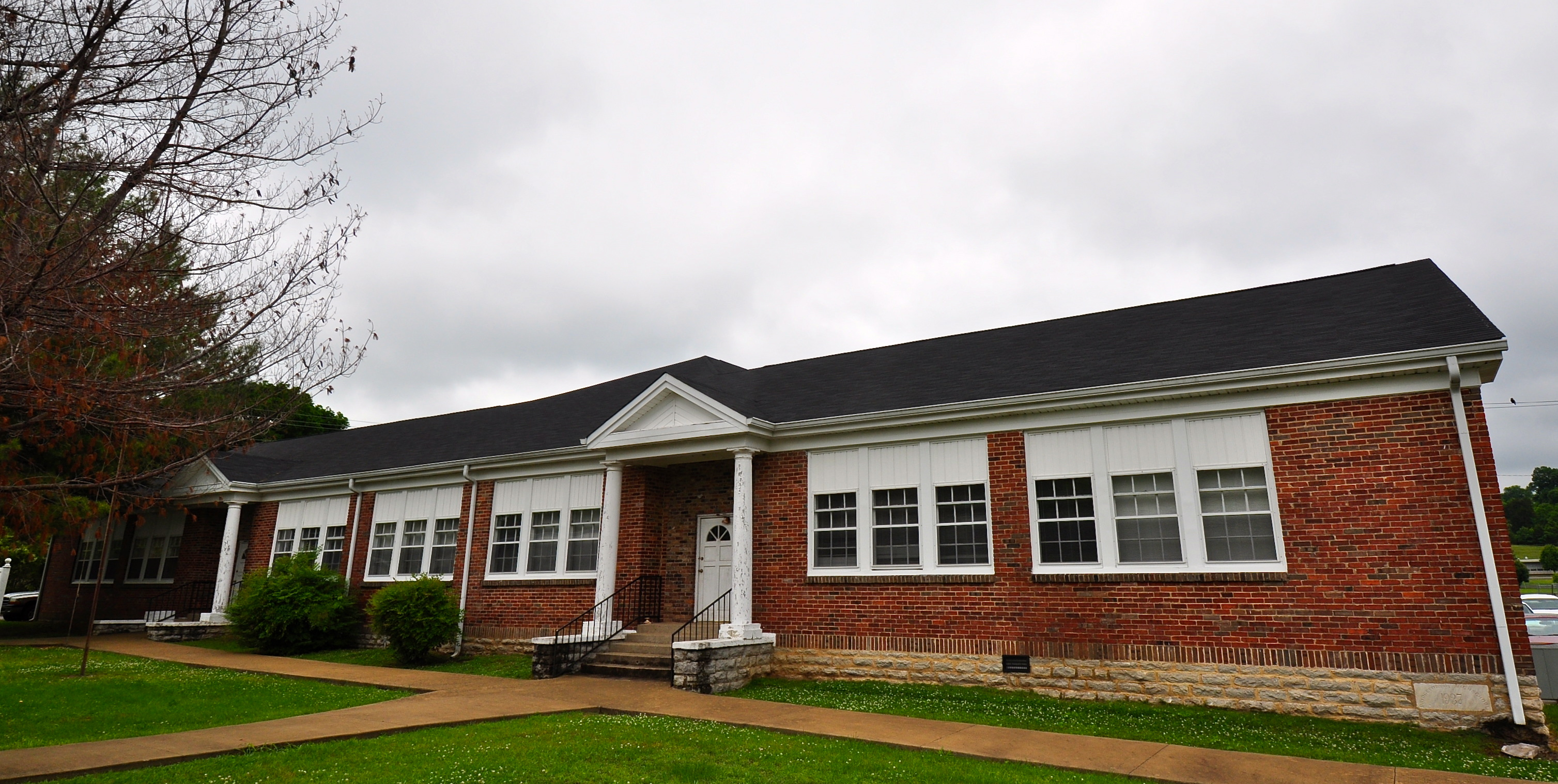
- Bridgeforth High School, May 2014.

- Location within Tennessee Location within the United States
- Location: 1095 Bledsoe Rd., Pulaski, Tennessee
- Coordinates: 35°12′45″N 87°1′35″W
- Area: less than one acre
- Built: 1936
- Architect: McKissack and McKissack; Taylor, Jackson
- Architectural style: Colonial Revival
- NRHP reference No.: 06000697
- Added to NRHP: August 9, 2006

Bridgeforth High School in Pulaski, Tennessee, was Giles County, Tennessee's, first high school for African Americans. It opened in 1937. It was named for J. T. Bridgeforth, who was one of the earliest African-American educators in the county.

The school's first building, also known as Bridgeforth School or the Greater Richland Creek Missionary Baptist General Association, is a colonial revival style building completed in 1936, that is listed on the National Register of Historic Places. It was designed by architects McKissack and McKissack. The building housed the high school until 1958, when it was replaced by a larger school building. The original Bridgeforth High School building was listed on the National Register in 2006. It is now used by a local religious organization.

Bridgeforth High School relocated to its new building in 1959 and remained there until 1965, when Giles County integrated its public school system. After integration, the building became the home of Pulaski Junior High School, which enrolled grades 7 to 9. In 1978, the junior high school was converted to a middle school for grades 5 through 8 and was renamed Bridgeforth Middle School.
