= Bass-Morrell House =

Historic house in Tennessee, United States

- U.S. National Register of Historic Places
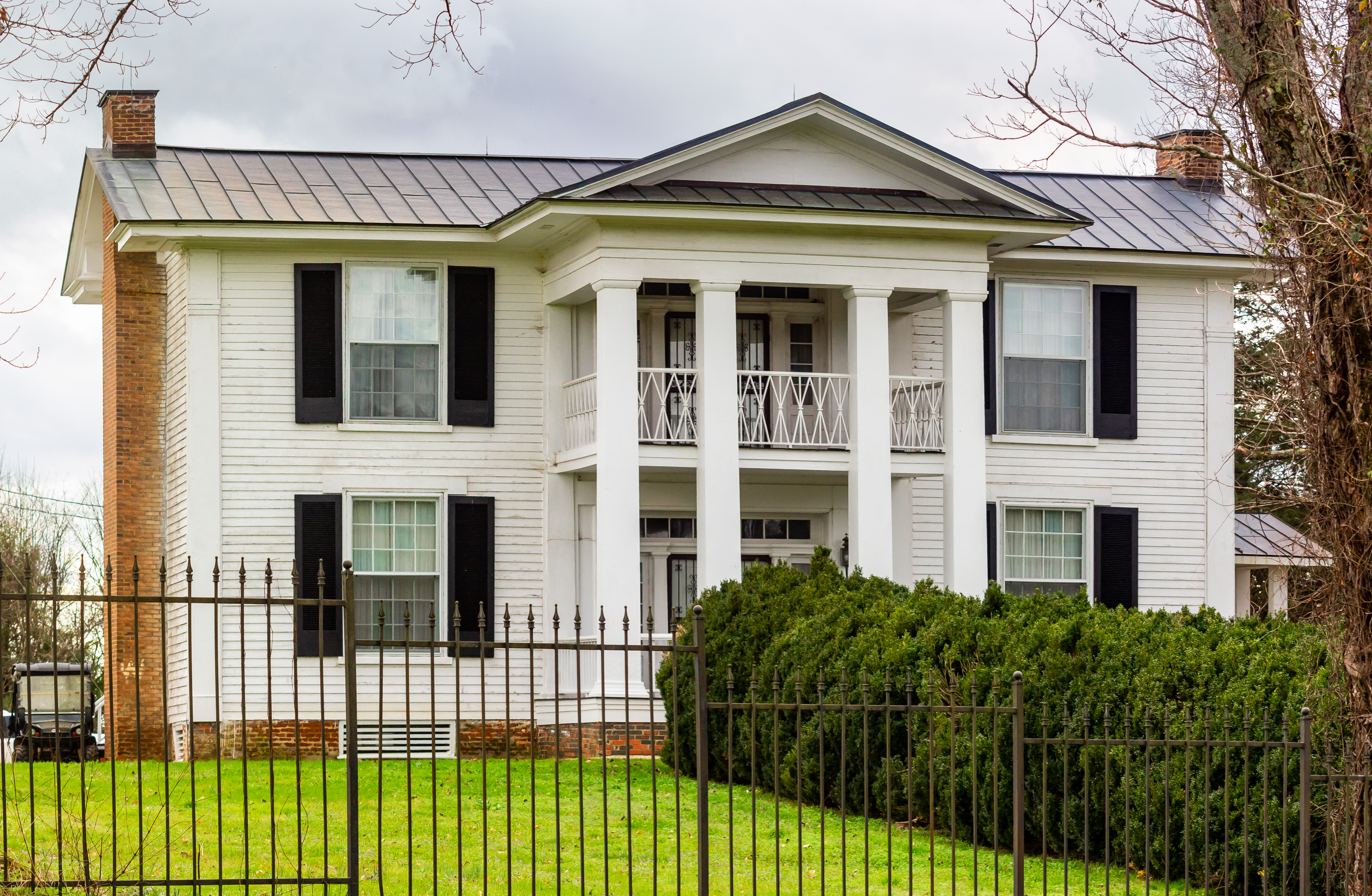

- Location within Tennessee
- Location: 2898 TN-273/Bryson Rd., Ardmore, Tennessee
- Coordinates: 35°5′19″N 86°51′54″W
- Area: 3.4 acres (1.4 ha)
- Built: 1840
- Architectural style: Greek Revival, I-house
- NRHP reference No.: 88002615
- Added to NRHP: November 10, 1988

The Bass-Morrell House is a historic mansion in Ardmore, Tennessee, United States. It was built in 1840 for John Bass, a landowner. It was designed in the Greek Revival architectural style. It was purchased by Jacob Morrell, the owner of the Elk River Grist Mills, in 1878. It has been listed on the National Register of Historic Places since November 10, 1988. It is an example of the "Middle Tennessee I-House," a regional variation on a vernacular architecture style of central passage house with a portico.
