= Newton White House =

Historic house in Tennessee, United States

- U.S. National Register of Historic Places
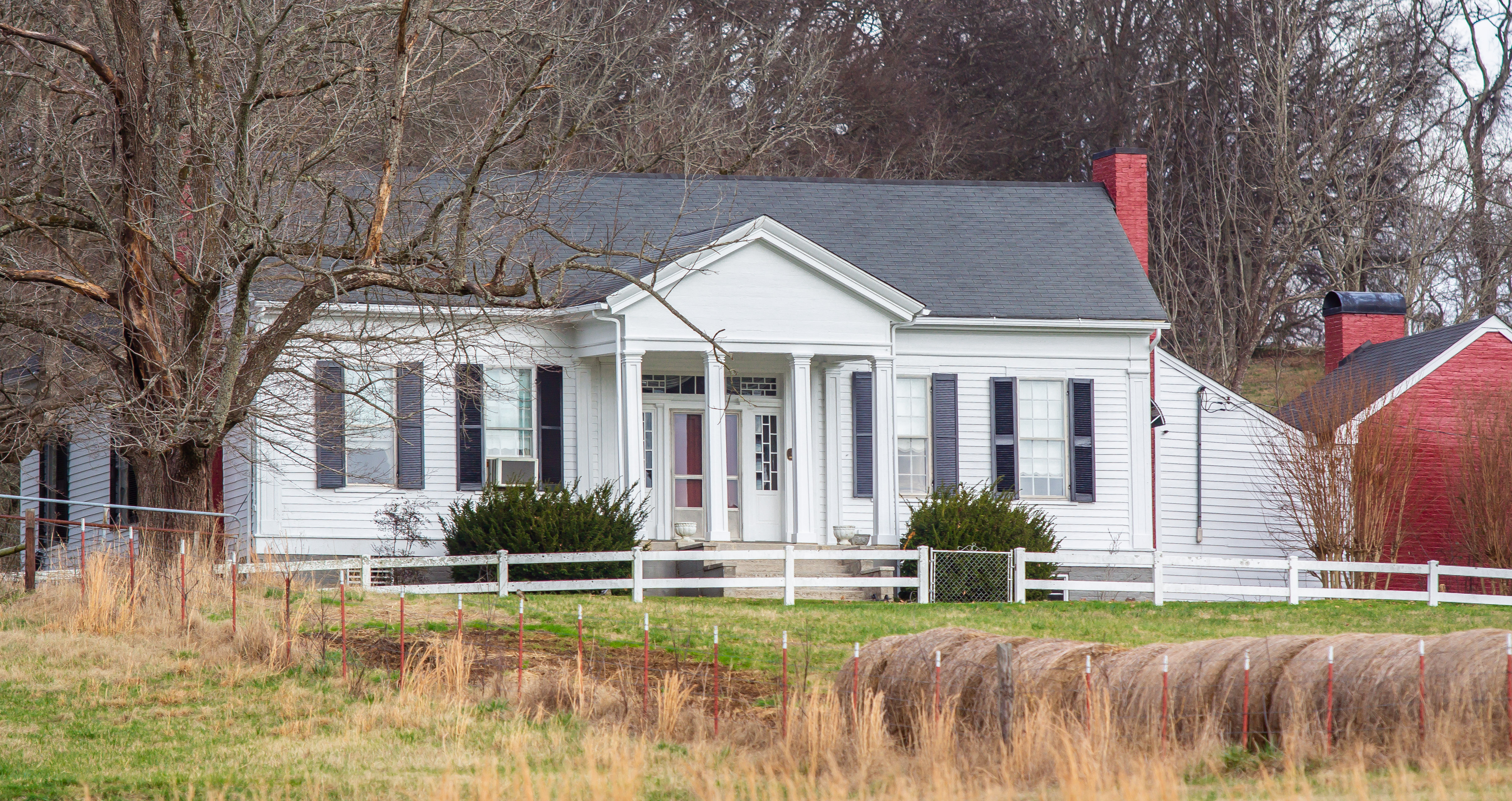

- Location within Tennessee
- Location: 1961 Bledsoa Rd., Pulaski, Tennessee
- Coordinates: 35°13′56″N 87°1′9″W
- Area: 2.5 acres (1.0 ha)
- Built: 1840
- Architectural style: Greek Revival
- NRHP reference No.: 87001884
- Added to NRHP: October 22, 1987

The Newton White House is a historic house in Pulaski, Tennessee. U.S..

== History ==
The land was granted to John White, a settler from South Carolina, in 1808. His son, Newton White, a slaveholder, built the house in 1840. It was designed in the Greek Revival architectural style. After Newton White died in 1891, his widow Courtney White continued to live in the house until it was inherited by their nephew, George S. White. By 1925, it was sold to the Whitt family, who sold it to the Walter Christopher family in 1943.

The house has been listed on the National Register of Historic Places since October 22, 1987.
