= Austin Hewitt Home =

Historic house in Tennessee, United States

- Hewitt, Austin, Home
- U.S. National Register of Historic Places
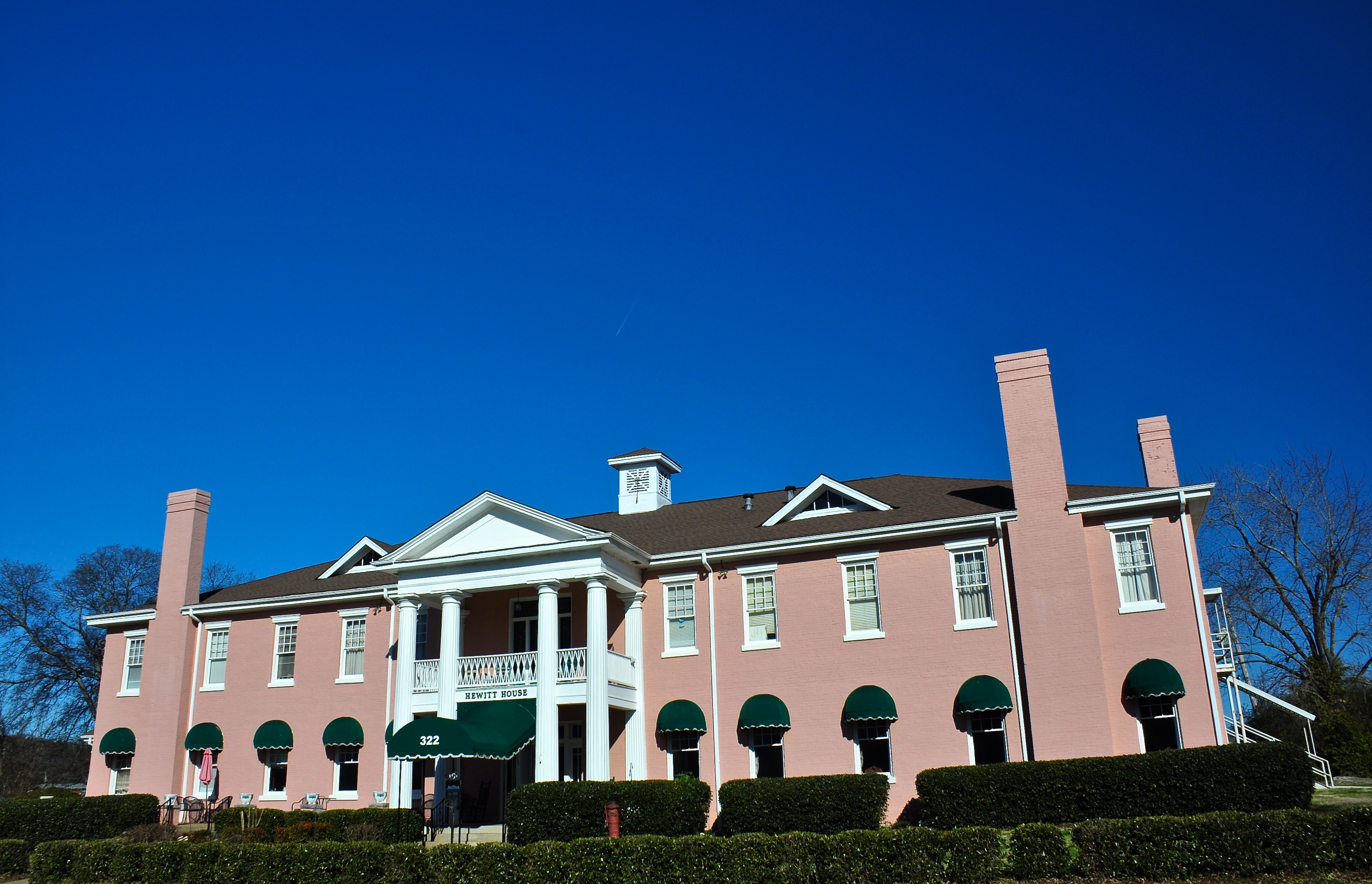
- The Austin Hewitt Home in 2015

- Location within Tennessee
- Location: 322 East Washington Street, Pulaski, Tennessee
- Coordinates: 35°12′4″N 87°1′38″W
- Area: 2.3 acres (0.93 ha)
- Built: 1839
- Architectural style: Greek Revival
- NRHP reference No.: 84000611
- Added to NRHP: December 13, 1984

The Austin Hewitt Home is a historic mansion in Pulaski, Tennessee, United States. It was home to the Pulaski Female Academy from 1832 to 1852. It was the private residence of the Childers, Ragsdale and Beasley families until 1924, when it became a home for indigent homeless women endowed by philanthropist Austin Hewitt. It is now a retirement home.

== History ==
The land belonged to John M. Bass and Eli E. Bass until 1832, when they sold it to Lunsford M. Bramlett, A.M. Ballentine, Ben Carter, Thomas Martin, and Fountain Tester, the co-founder of the Pulaski Female Academy. The house was built in 1839. It was designed in the Greek Revival architectural style.

The house was purchased by Joseph B. Childers in 1852. It was subsequently purchased by J. H. Ragsdale, who served as the mayor of Pulaski. Ragsdale lived in the house with his wife, Elizabeth Bull, and their two daughters, Clarissa and Mary Lambeth. It was acquired by W. Frank Ewing in 1917. Two years later, in 1919, it was purchased by Polk Comer, and by N. S. Beasley shortly after. The Beasleys lived in the house from 1919 to 1924.

In 1924, the house became home to the "indigent old women of Giles County", thanks to a US$200,000 donation from the estate of philanthropist Austin Hewitt. However, Hewitt's trust ran out by 1981, and it was remodelled as a retirement home by developer Robert W. Brindley.

The house has been listed on the National Register of Historic Places since December 13, 1984.
