= Waco, Tennessee =

Unincorporated community in Tennessee, US

Coordinates: 35°22′33″N 87°01′55″W

Waco is an unincorporated community in Giles County, Tennessee, formerly known as "Old Lynville". It is located at the crossroads of U.S. Route 31 and State Route 129.
