= National Register of Historic Places listings in Marshall County, Tennessee =

Location of Marshall County in Tennessee

This is a list of the National Register of Historic Places listings in Marshall County, Tennessee.

This is intended to be a complete list of the properties and districts on the National Register of Historic Places in Marshall County, Tennessee, United States. Latitude and longitude coordinates are provided for many National Register properties and districts; these locations may be seen together in a map.

There are 23 properties and districts listed on the National Register in the county.

Contents: Counties in Tennessee
Anderson – Bedford – Benton – Bledsoe – Blount – Bradley – Campbell – Cannon – Carroll – Carter – Cheatham – Chester – Claiborne – Clay – Cocke – Coffee – Crockett – Cumberland – Davidson – Decatur – DeKalb – Dickson – Dyer – Fayette – Fentress – Franklin – Gibson – Giles – Grainger – Greene – Grundy – Hamblen – Hamilton – Hancock – Hardeman – Hardin – Hawkins – Haywood – Henderson – Henry – Hickman – Houston – Humphreys – Jackson – Jefferson – Johnson – Knox – Lake – Lauderdale – Lawrence – Lewis – Lincoln – Loudon – Macon – Madison – Marion – Marshall – Maury – McMinn – McNairy – Meigs – Monroe – Montgomery – Moore – Morgan – Obion – Overton – Perry – Pickett – Polk – Putnam – Rhea – Roane – Robertson – Rutherford – Scott – Sequatchie – Sevier – Shelby – Smith – Stewart – Sullivan – Sumner – Tipton – Trousdale – Unicoi – Union – Van Buren – Warren – Washington – Wayne – Weakley – White – Williamson – Wilson

This National Park Service list is complete through NPS recent listings posted March 21, 2025.

== Current listings ==
	Name on the Register	Image	Date listed	Location	City or town	Description
1	Joe Chase Adams House	Joe Chase Adams House	December 2, 1993 (#93001354)	327 E. Church St. 35°26′59″N 86°47′02″W	Lewisburg	
2	Baird-Welch House	Baird-Welch House	March 21, 1985 (#85000621)	Water St. 35°21′43″N 86°50′18″W	Cornersville	
3	Bear Creek Cumberland Presbyterian Church	Bear Creek Cumberland Presbyterian Church	March 28, 1985 (#85000667)	Bear Creek Rd. 35°25′23″N 86°55′55″W	Mooresville	
4	Belfast Railroad Depot	Belfast Railroad Depot	August 9, 1984 (#84003606)	U.S. Route 431; 35°25′12″N 86°42′07″W	Belfast	
5	Berlin Historic District		August 30, 1984 (#84003609)	U.S. Route 431; 35°31′36″N 86°49′50″W	Berlin	
6	Joseph Brittain House	Joseph Brittain House	March 17, 1997 (#97000241)	Junction of Thick and Sweeney Rds. 35°40′44″N 86°43′45″W	Thick	
7	Chapel Hill Cumberland Presbyterian Church	Chapel Hill Cumberland Presbyterian Church	August 30, 1985 (#85001897)	302 N. Horton Pkwy. 35°37′46″N 86°41′28″W	Chapel Hill	
8	Confederate Cemetery Monument	Confederate Cemetery Monument	July 11, 2001 (#01000731)	2279 TN-64; 35°29′54″N 86°41′53″W	Lewisburg	
9	Cornersville Methodist Episcopal Church South	Cornersville Methodist Episcopal Church South	April 15, 1982 (#82003991)	100 S. Mulberry St. 35°21′43″N 86°50′29″W	Cornersville	
10	Dixie Theatre		October 28, 2021 (#100007126)	110 West Church St. 35°27′00″N 86°47′18″W	Lewisburg	
11	Ewing Farm	Ewing Farm	April 5, 1984 (#84003612)	1498 New Columbia Hwy. 35°28′47″N 86°47′58″W	Lewisburg	
12	Fitzpatrick House	Fitzpatrick House	August 26, 1982 (#82003992)	810 Fitzpatrick Rd. 35°26′30″N 86°54′54″W	Culleoka	
13	Nathan Bedford Forrest Boyhood Home	Nathan Bedford Forrest Boyhood Home	July 13, 1977 (#77001280)	1435 Dean Rd; 35°38′25″N 86°45′02″W	Chapel Hill	
14	Robert C. Harris House	Robert C. Harris House	January 27, 1983 (#83003051)	3107 Old Columbia Rd. 35°30′08″N 86°52′29″W	South Berlin	
15	Ladies Rest Room	Ladies Rest Room	November 29, 1995 (#95001380)	105 1st Ave., N. 35°26′45″N 86°46′57″W	Lewisburg	
16	Lillard's Mill Hydroelectric Station	Lillard's Mill Hydroelectric Station	April 20, 1990 (#89002370)	Milltown Rd. Boat Ramp Duck River; 35°34′59″N 86°46′48″W	Milltown	
17	Palmetto Farm	Palmetto Farm	March 28, 1985 (#85000675)	2935 Shelbyville Hwy. State Route 64; 35°29′28″N 86°39′49″W	Bedford	Extends into Bedford County
18	Presbyterian Church, U.S.A.	Presbyterian Church, U.S.A.	November 27, 2019 (#100004693)	300 Water St. 35°27′04″N 86°47′25″W	Lewisburg	
19	Swaim House	Swaim House	July 12, 1984 (#84003613)	200 N. Horton Pkwy; 35°37′41″N 86°41′33″W	Chapel Hill	
20	J.C. Tate General Merchandise Store	J.C. Tate General Merchandise Store	July 12, 1978 (#78002608)	1515 Fishing Ford Rd. 35°25′11″N 86°42′10″W	Belfast	
21	Valley Farm	Valley Farm	April 5, 1984 (#84003616)	1892 Cornersville Hwy. 35°23′28″N 86°49′11″W	Cornersville	
22	Verona Methodist Episcopal Church, South	Verona Methodist Episcopal Church, South	November 7, 1985 (#85002755)	724 John Lund Rd. 35°31′46″N 86°46′21″W	Lewisburg	Renamed Reformed Baptist Fellowship
23	WJJM Radio Station and Tower	WJJM Radio Station and Tower	July 10, 2017 (#100001304)	344 E Church St. 35°27′01″N 86°47′01″W	Lewisburg	

== See also ==
- List of National Historic Landmarks in Tennessee
- National Register of Historic Places listings in Tennessee
