= Tornado outbreak of March 20–21, 1913 =

Tornado outbreak in the United States

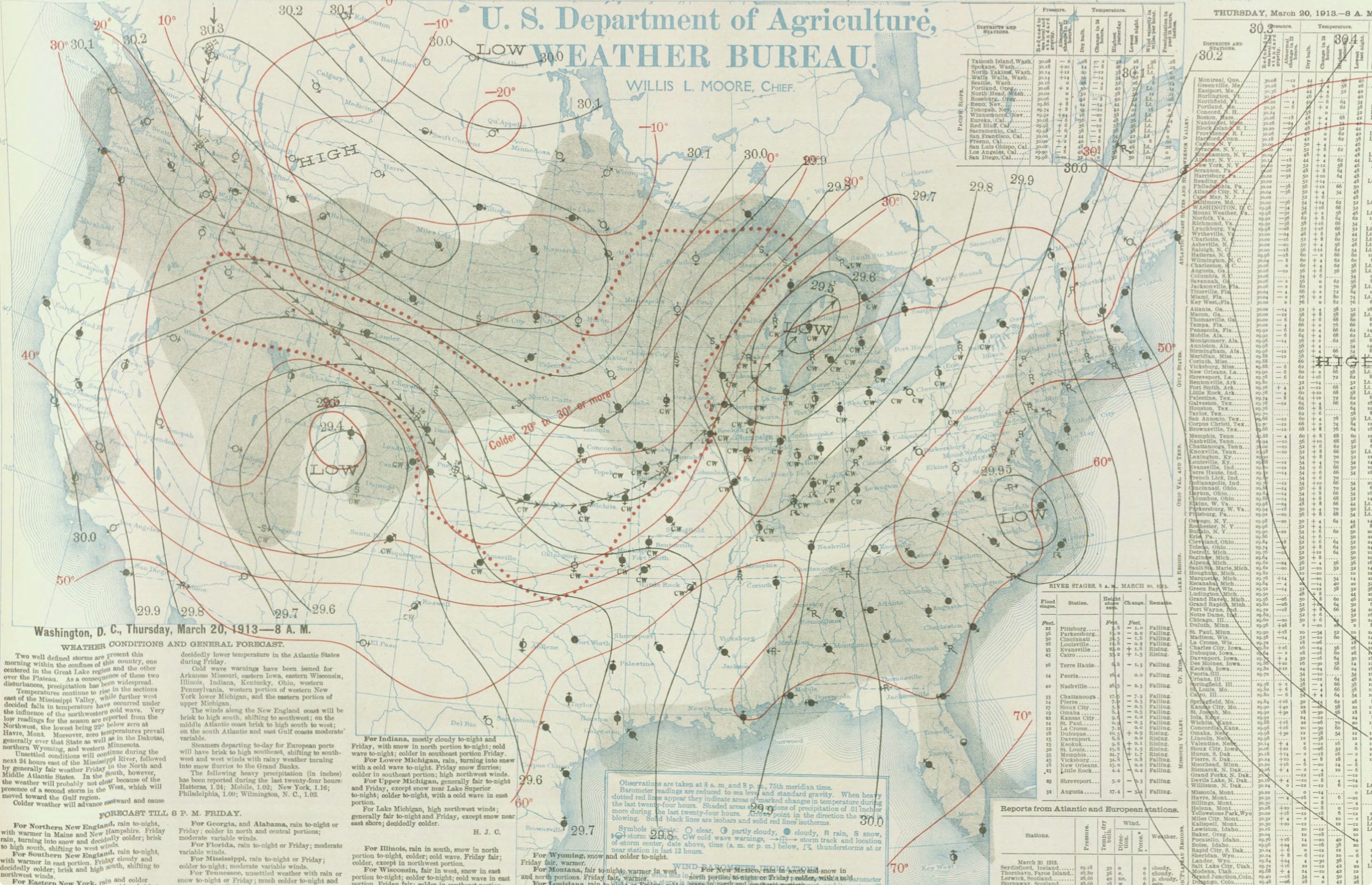
- Weather map on March 20 showing weather patterns during the tornado outbreak

Tornado outbreak
- Tornadoes: ≥ 16
- Max. rating: F4 tornado
- Duration: March 20–21, 1913

Overall effects
- Fatalities: 53
- Injuries: ≥ 156
- Damage: > $655,000 ($21,340,000 in 2025 USD) (Note: All losses are in 1913 United States dollars unless otherwise noted.)
- Areas affected: Southern United States
- Part of the tornadoes and tornado outbreaks of 1913

On March 20–21, 1913, a tornado outbreak affected southern parts of the United States, claiming 53 lives and injuring at least 156 people. The deadliest tornado of the outbreak, retroactively rated F4 on the Fujita scale, struck Lower Peach Tree, Alabama, killing 27 people and injuring 60. Multiple long-lived tornado families occurred, including a long-tracked F2 in neighboring Mississippi that killed nine. Four other F2s in both these states and Tennessee each caused three deaths. At least a dozen tornadoes hit Arkansas, most of which were unrated. A few days following the outbreak, a much more violent and deadlier event began. (Note: An outbreak is generally defined as a group of at least six tornadoes (the number sometimes varies slightly according to local climatology) with no more than a six-hour gap between individual tornadoes. An outbreak sequence, prior to (after) the start of modern records in 1950, is defined as a period of no more than two (one) consecutive days without at least one significant (F2 or stronger) tornado.)

== Confirmed tornadoes ==
Confirmed tornadoes by Fujita rating
FU	F0	F1	F2	F3	F4	F5	Total
9	2	0	13	0	1	0	≥ 16

- A tornado may have wrecked a home just northwest of Lewisburg, Tennessee.
- Tornadoes may have hit Putnam and Maury counties, Tennessee.

Prior to 1990, there is a likely undercount of tornadoes, particularly E/F0–1, with reports of weaker tornadoes becoming more common as population increased. A sharp increase in the annual average E/F0–1 count by approximately 200 tornadoes was noted upon the implementation of NEXRAD Doppler weather radar in 1990–1991. (Note: Historically, the number of tornadoes globally and in the United States was and is likely underrepresented: research by Grazulis on annual tornado activity suggests that, as of 2001, only 53% of yearly U.S. tornadoes were officially recorded. Documentation of tornadoes outside the United States was historically less exhaustive, owing to the lack of monitors in many nations and, in some cases, to internal political controls on public information. Most countries only recorded tornadoes that produced severe damage or loss of life. Significant low biases in U.S. tornado counts likely occurred through the early 1990s, when advanced NEXRAD was first installed and the National Weather Service began comprehensively verifying tornado occurrences.) 1974 marked the first year where significant tornado (E/F2+) counts became homogenous with contemporary values, attributed to the consistent implementation of Fujita scale assessments. (Note: The Fujita scale was devised under the aegis of scientist T. Theodore Fujita in the early 1970s. Prior to the advent of the scale in 1971, tornadoes in the United States were officially unrated. Tornado ratings were retroactively applied to events prior to the formal adoption of the F-scale by the National Weather Service. While the Fujita scale has been superseded by the Enhanced Fujita scale in the U.S. since February 1, 2007, Canada used the old scale until April 1, 2013; nations elsewhere, like the United Kingdom, apply other classifications such as the TORRO scale.) Numerous discrepancies on the details of tornadoes in this outbreak exist between sources. The total count of tornadoes and ratings differs from various agencies accordingly. The list below documents information from the most contemporary official sources alongside assessments from tornado historian Thomas P. Grazulis.

=== March 20 event ===
List of confirmed tornadoes – Thursday, March 20, 1913
F#	Location	County / Parish	State	Time (UTC) (Note: All dates are based on the local time zone where the tornado touched down; however, all times are in Coordinated Universal Time and dates are split at midnight CST/CDT for consistency.)	Path length	Width (Note: The listed width values are primarily the average/mean width of the tornadoes, with those having known maximum widths denoted by ♯. From 1952 to 1994, reports largely list mean width whereas contemporary years list maximum width. Values provided by Grazulis are the average width, with estimates being rounded down (i.e., 0.5 mi (0.80 km) is rounded down from 880 yards to 800 yards).)	Damage (Note: The National Oceanic and Atmospheric Administration's Storm Data publication does not list exact damage totals for every event, instead giving damage categories. As such, damage for individual tornadoes is not comprehensive.)
F2	W of McGehee to near McArthur	Desha	AR	15:30–?	10 mi (16 km)	Unknown	Unknown
F2	A tornado destroyed 25 homes.						
F2	Hoxie to Walnut Ridge	Lawrence	AR	15:30–?	5 mi (8.0 km)	Unknown	$100,000
F2	A tornado wrecked both downtowns, injuring five people.						
F2	Near Paragould	Greene	AR	Unknown	Unknown	Unknown	Unknown
F2	A tornado destroyed a house, injuring four people inside.						
FU	Gillett	Arkansas	AR	Unknown	Unknown	Unknown	Unknown
FU	Details are unavailable.						
FU	Eudora	Chicot	AR	Unknown	Unknown	Unknown	Unknown
FU	1 death – Details are unavailable.						
FU	Brinkley	Monroe	AR	Unknown	Unknown	Unknown	Unknown
FU	Details are unavailable.						
FU	Star City	Lincoln	AR	Unknown	Unknown	Unknown	Unknown
FU	Details are unavailable.						
FU	Nettleton	Craighead	AR	Unknown	Unknown	Unknown	Unknown
FU	Details are unavailable.						
FU	Newport	Jackson	AR	Unknown	Unknown	Unknown	Unknown
FU	Details are unavailable.						
FU	Wynne	Cross	AR	Unknown	Unknown	Unknown	Unknown
FU	Details are unavailable.						
FU	Pine Bluff	Jefferson	AR	Unknown	Unknown	Unknown	Unknown
FU	Details are unavailable.						
FU	Near Jonesboro	Craighead	AR	Unknown	Unknown	Unknown	Unknown
FU	Two injuries occurred.						

=== March 21 event ===
List of confirmed tornadoes – Friday, March 21, 1913
F#	Location	County / Parish	State	Time (UTC)	Path length	Width	Damage
F2	S of Madison to near Buckhead	Morgan	GA	06:00–?	8 mi (13 km)	Unknown	Unknown
F2	1 death – A tornado hit five plantations, wrecking 30 buildings and injuring seven people.						
F2	Louisville to N of Macon	Winston, Noxubee	MS	06:00–06:30	30 mi (48 km)	100 yd (91 m)	>$25,000
F2	9 deaths – A tornado family destroyed or damaged 25 homes in Louisville, killing a few people and injuring 15. Near Macon it killed seven more, including five family members, and wrecked a church before dissipating.						
F2	Near Ruleville	Sunflower	MS	06:30–?	Unknown	Unknown	Unknown
F2	3 deaths – A tornado obliterated homes.						
F2	Rienzi to Corinth	Prentiss, Alcorn	MS	06:30–?	5 mi (8.0 km)	Unknown	Unknown
F2	2 deaths – A strong tornado ravaged Riezi, causing deaths there. 18 injuries occurred.						
F0+	SSW of Wayland Springs to NNE of Ethridge	Lawrence	TN	06:30–?	Unknown	Unknown	Unknown
F0+	A strong quasi-linear convective system (QLCS) traversed Middle Tennessee, generating multiple tornadoes. This event—possibly a family of up to two tornadoes—unroofed several homes, blew others off their foundations, and leveled five or six barns. An injury occurred.						
F2	Near Florence	Lauderdale	AL	07:00–?	Unknown	Unknown	Unknown
F2	3 deaths – A tornado destroyed seven barns and 20 homes, killing three children.						
F0+	NNE of Riversburg to Bivens	Giles	TN	07:00–?	Unknown	Unknown	Unknown
F0+	A tornado damaged an orchard, tenant homes, outhouses, and machinery. It also downed fruit trees, ripped off a cupola, tore loose a kitchen, knocked down chimneys, unroofed some homes, and destroyed a pair of buggies.						
F2	W of Decatur to near Trinity to near Meridianville	Morgan, Limestone, Madison	AL	07:30–?	40 mi (64 km)	100 yd (91 m)	Unknown
F2	3 deaths – A tornado family destroyed outbuildings, a church, and tenant homes, as well as other residences, injuring 20 people. Two of the dead were children.						
F2	SW of Lewisburg to near Verona to S of Chapel Hill	Marshall	TN	07:30–?	15 mi (24 km)	Unknown	$100,000
F2	3 deaths – A tornado destroyed or damaged many barns and homes, injuring three people.						
F2	Murfreesboro	Rutherford	TN	08:10–?	2 mi (3.2 km)	100 yd (91 m)	$300,000
F2	A tornado hit downtown Murfreesboro, unroofing seven boxcars, felling trees, collapsing stables, and damaging buildings. An injury occurred.						
F2	E of Talladega to Heflin	Talladega, Clay, Cleburne	AL	09:00–?	35 mi (56 km)	Unknown	Unknown
F2	An intermittent tornado destroyed 12 homes, leaving 100 people homeless and injuring 10 others. At times multiple tornadoes were observed 1 mi (1.6 km) apart, and parallel damage swaths were reported.						
F4	Scyrene to Lower Peach Tree	Clarke, Wilcox	AL	10:30–?	13 mi (21 km)	400 yd (370 m)	$130,000
F4	27 deaths – A violent tornado impacted 100 homes at Lower Peach Tree, blowing to "splinters" and leveling over 20 well-built houses, according to reports quoted by Grazulis. A pillow was found 20 mi (32 km) away. 60 injuries occurred, among them 10 at Scyrene.						
F2	Asahel to E of Camden	Wilcox	AL	11:00–?	12 mi (19 km)	200 yd (180 m)	Unknown
F2	1 death – 10 injuries occurred.						

== See also ==
- Dixie Alley
- List of North American tornadoes and tornado outbreaks

== Sources ==
- Alciatore, H. F. (March 1913). "Tornadoes in Arkansas, March 1913". Monthly Weather Review. 41 (3). Washington, D.C.: United States Weather Bureau: 415. Bibcode:1913MWRv...41..415A. doi:10.1175/1520-0493(1913)41<415b:TIAM>2.0.CO;2 – via American Meteorological Society.
- Agee, Ernest M.; Childs, Samuel (June 1, 2014). "Adjustments in Tornado Counts, F-Scale Intensity, and Path Width for Assessing Significant Tornado Destruction". Journal of Applied Meteorology and Climatology. 53 (6). American Meteorological Society: 1494–1505. Bibcode:2014JApMC..53.1494A. doi:10.1175/JAMC-D-13-0235.1.
- Brooks, Harold E. (April 2004). "On the Relationship of Tornado Path Length and Width to Intensity". Weather and Forecasting. 19 (2): 310–19. Bibcode:2004WtFor..19..310B. doi:10.1175/1520-0434(2004)019<0310:OTROTP>2.0.CO;2.
- Cook, A. R.; Schaefer, J. T. (August 2008). "The Relation of El Niño–Southern Oscillation (ENSO) to Winter Tornado Outbreaks". Monthly Weather Review. 136 (8): 3121–3137. Bibcode:2008MWRv..136.3121C. doi:10.1175/2007MWR2171.1.
- Edwards, Roger; LaDue, James G.; Ferree, John T.; Scharfenberg, Kevin; Maier, Chris; Coulbourne, William L. (May 1, 2013). "Tornado Intensity Estimation: Past, Present, and Future". Bulletin of the American Meteorological Society. 94 (5). American Meteorological Society: 641–653. Bibcode:2013BAMS...94..641E. doi:10.1175/BAMS-D-11-00006.1.
- Grazulis, Thomas P. (May 1984). Violent Tornado Climatography, 1880–1982. OSTI (Technical report). NUREG. Washington, D.C.: Nuclear Regulatory Commission. OSTI 7099491. CR-3670.
  - — (November 1990). Significant Tornadoes 1880–1989. Vol. 2. St. Johnsbury, Vermont: The Tornado Project of Environmental Films. ISBN 1-879362-02-3.
  - — (July 1993). Significant Tornadoes 1680–1991: A Chronology and Analysis of Events. St. Johnsbury, Vermont: The Tornado Project of Environmental Films. ISBN 1-879362-03-1.
  - — (2001a). The Tornado: Nature's Ultimate Windstorm. Norman: University of Oklahoma Press. ISBN 978-0-8061-3538-0.
  - — (2001b). F5-F6 Tornadoes. St. Johnsbury, Vermont: The Tornado Project of Environmental Films.
- Von Hermann, Charles F. (March 1913). "District No. 2, South Atlantic and East Gulf States". Monthly Weather Review. 41 (3). Washington, D.C.: United States Weather Bureau: 340–56. Bibcode:1913MWRv...41..340V. doi:10.1175/1520-0493(1913)41<340:DNSAAE>2.0.CO;2 – via American Meteorological Society.
