= Archer, Tennessee =

- Unincorporated community
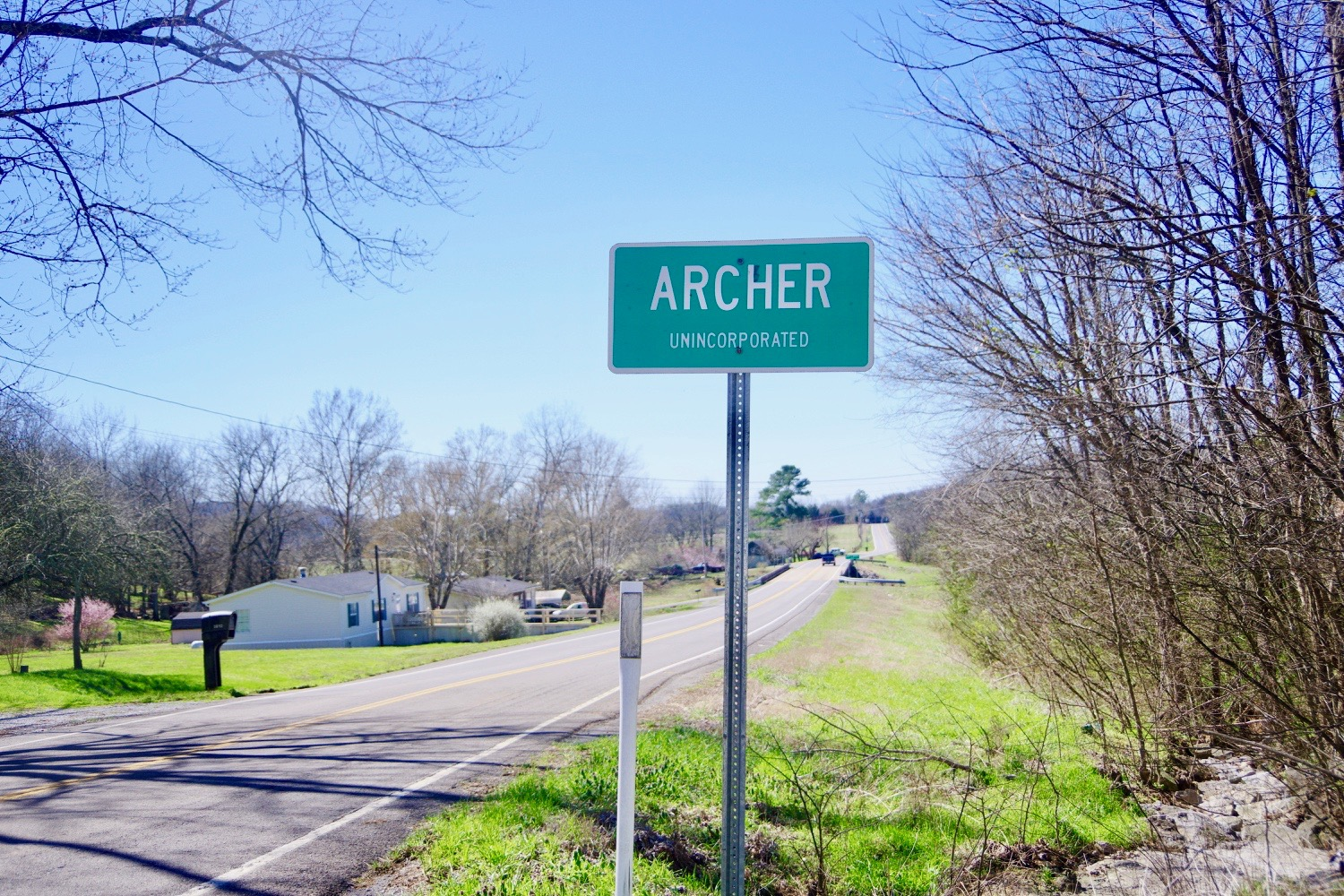
- Sign along SR 272

- Location within Tennessee Location within the United States
- Coordinates: 35°19′41″N 86°45′35″W
- Country: United States
- State: Tennessee
- County: Marshall
- Elevation: 781 ft (238 m)
- Time zone: UTC-6 (Central (CST))
  - Summer (DST): UTC-5 (CDT)
- ZIP code: 37091
- Area code: 931
- GNIS feature ID: 1310501

Archer is an unincorporated community in Marshall County, in the U.S. state of Tennessee. It is located at the intersection of State Route 272 and State Route 129 between Cornersville and Petersburg.

== History ==
A variant name was "Spring Place". A post office called Spring Place was established in 1840, and closed in 1871; the Archer post office was in operation from 1887 until 1905. The community was renamed in the late 19th century for one of its store owners, Archer Beasley.
