= Chapel Hill, Tennessee =

- Town
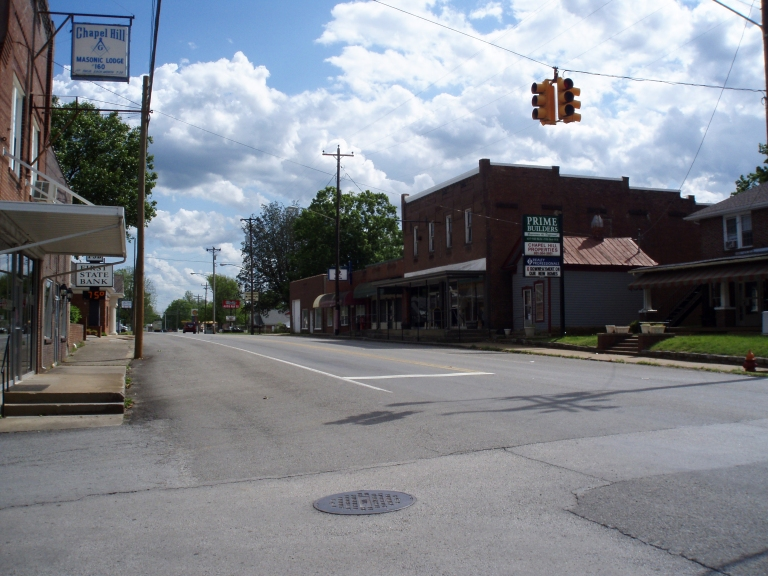
- Motto: Moving forward with strong tradition
- Location of Chapel Hill in Marshall County, Tennessee.
- Coordinates: 35°37′41″N 86°41′46″W
- Country: United States
- State: Tennessee
- County: Marshall
- Settled: 1808
- Incorporated: 1849

Government
  - Type: Mayor and Board of Aldermen
  - Mayor: Ben Piper

Area
  - Total: 3.75 sq mi (9.71 km^{2})
  - Land: 3.75 sq mi (9.71 km^{2})
  - Water: 0 sq mi (0.00 km^{2})
- Elevation: 692 ft (211 m)

Population (2020)
  - Total: 1,717
  - Density: 457.9/sq mi (176.79/km^{2})
- Time zone: UTC-6 (CST)
  - Summer (DST): UTC-5 (CDT)
- ZIP code: 37034
- Area code: 931
- FIPS code: 47-12880
- GNIS feature ID: 1269440
- Website: https://www.townofchapelhilltn.gov/

Chapel Hill is a town in northeastern Marshall County, Tennessee, United States. The town was named after Chapel Hill, North Carolina, by settlers from that area. The population was 1,717 as of the 2020 census.

== Geography ==
Chapel Hill is located at 35°37′41″N 86°41′46″W (35.628154, -86.696203). According to the United States Census Bureau, the town has a total area of 1.4 square miles (3.6 km^{2}), all of it land.

=== Communities ===
- Caney Spring
- Holts Corner
- Clay Hill - Rich Creek
- Laws Hill
- Farmington
- Verona

=== Nearby cities and towns ===
- College Grove
- Columbia
- Cornersville
- Eagleville
- Franklin
- Lewisburg
- Murfreesboro
- Nashville
- Nolensville
- Shelbyville
- Spring Hill
- Unionville

== Demographics ==
Historical population
Census	Pop.	Note	%±
1880	112		—
1930	377		—
1940	391		3.7%
1950	603		54.2%
1960	630		4.5%
1970	752		19.4%
1980	861		14.5%
1990	833		−3.3%
2000	943		13.2%
2010	1,445		53.2%
2020	1,717		18.8%

=== 2020 census ===
Chapel Hill racial composition
Race	Number	Percentage
White (non-Hispanic)	1,520	88.53%
Black or African American (non-Hispanic)	64	3.73%
Native American	5	0.29%
Other/Mixed	48	2.8%
Hispanic or Latino	80	4.66%

As of the 2020 United States census, there were 1,717 people, 660 households, and 396 families residing in the town.

=== 2000 census ===
As of the census of 2000, there were 944 people, 398 households, and 278 families residing in the town. The population density was 689.3 inhabitants per square mile (266.1/km^{2}). There were 430 housing units at an average density of 314.1 per square mile (121.3/km^{2}). The racial makeup of the town was 97.7% White, 2.7% African American, 0.5% Native American, 0.6% from other races. Hispanic or Latino of any race were 0.7% of the population.

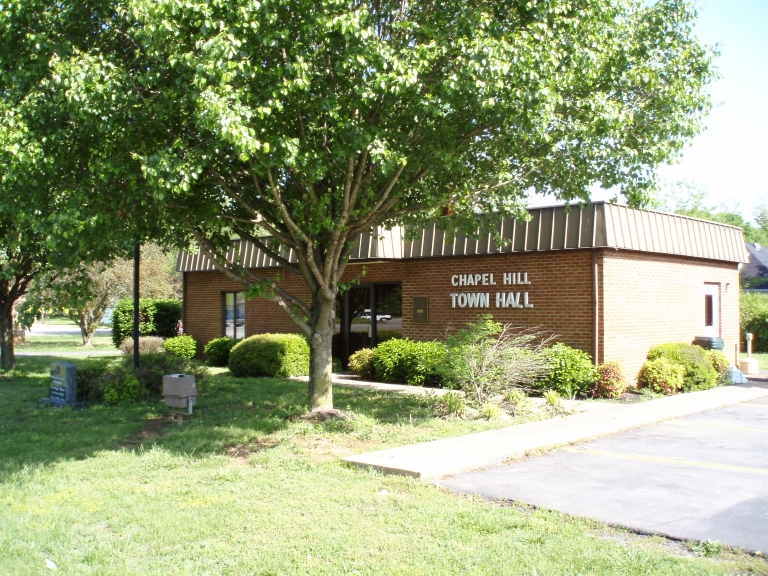
Chapel Hill Town Hall

There were 398 households, out of which 31.8% had children under the age of 18 living with them, 55.3% were married couples living together, 10.9% had a female householder with no husband present, and 29.8% were non-families. 27.3% of all households were made up of individuals, and 14.9% had someone living alone who was 65 years of age or older. The average household size was 2.38 and the average family size was 2.88.

In the town, the population was spread out, with 24.2% under the age of 18, 8.6% from 18 to 24, 25.5% from 25 to 44, 24.5% from 45 to 64, and 18.2% who were 65 years of age or older. The median age was 41 years. For every 100 females, there were 90.7 males. For every 100 females age 18 and over, there were 85.2 males.

The median income for a household in the town was $38,173, and the median income for a family was $45,521. Males had a median income of $36,000 versus $24,286 for females. The per capita income for the town was $18,283. About 4.6% of families and 8.1% of the population were below the poverty line, including 11.9% of those under age 18 and 9.5% of those age 65 or over.

== Economy ==
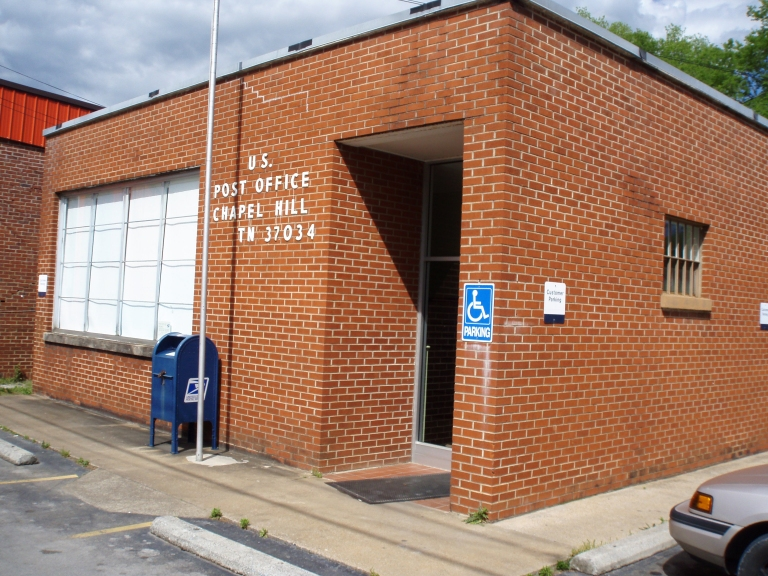
Chapel Hill Post Office

=== Utilities ===
- Electricity - Duck River Electric Membership
- Gas - Horton Highway Utility District
- Telephone - United Telephone
- Water - Town of Chapel Hill, Marshall County Board of Public Utilities

=== Transportation ===
- U.S. 31A
- State Route 99
- State Route 270
- I-65
- I-840
- I-24
- CSX Transportation (rail freight)

== Education ==
=== K-12 ===
- Forrest School - 7-12
- Delk-Henson Intermediate School - 4-6
- Chapel Hill Elementary School - K-3
- Marshall County School System

=== Higher education ===
- Columbia State Community College, Columbia, TN; Lewisburg, TN
- Middle Tennessee State University, Murfreesboro, TN
- Tennessee Colleges of Applied Technology - Pulaski, Lewisburg, TN

== Tourism ==
=== Henry Horton State Park ===
Henry Horton State Park is located near Chapel Hill, along the Duck River on the former estate of the late Henry Hollis Horton, 36th governor of Tennessee. The park includes the Buford Ellington Golf Course, hiking trails, playground, cabins, picnic facilities, trap and skeet range, conference facilities, restaurant, and both Olympic-sized and children's swimming pools. Activities also include camping, canoeing, volleyball, disc golf, baseball, basketball, and tennis.

=== Events ===
- Lions Super Pull of the South Truck and Tractor Pull (July) sponsored by the Chapel Hill Lions Club.
- Step Back in Time at Henry Horton State Park (September) - See antique farm equipment in action, tractor parade, candle making, making of lye soap, craft booths, long hunters, music and much more.
- Middle Tennessee Small Band Championship - hosted by the Forrest High School Rocket Band of Blue.
- Chapel Hill Christmas Parade
- Tractorpullooza - Voted greatest outdoor concert in the state of Tennessee 3 years in a row. Usually held the night of the Tractor Pull.

=== Other points of interest ===
- Duck River
- Nathan Bedford Forrest Boyhood Home
- Swaim House
- F3 Marshall, a chapter or "region" of the F3 Nation, is a free mens workout group that meets multiple times a week at Henry Horton State Park.

== Notable people ==
- Nathan Bedford Forrest - Confederate general and Ku Klux Klan figure
- Henry Horton - Governor of Tennessee from 1927 to 1933
- Grady Martin - Guitarist and session musician
- Mike Minor - Major League Baseball pitcher with the Kansas City Royals.
- Claude Osteen - Former Major League Baseball pitcher/coach
- Todd Warner - Member of the Tennessee House of Representatives (2021–present)
