= Swaim House =

Swaim House may refer to:

- Swaim House (Russellville, Arkansas), listed on the National Register of Historic Places in Pope County, Arkansas
- Swaim House (Chapel Hill, Tennessee), listed on the National Register of Historic Places in Marshall County, Tennessee
