= Rich Creek =

Rich Creek may refer to:

- Rich Creek, Tennessee, an unincorporated community
- Rich Creek, Virginia, a town in Virginia
- Rich Creek (Bluestone River), a stream in West Virginia
- Rich Creek (Read Creek), a creek in New York
