= Yelling (disambiguation) =

Yelling or screaming is a loud vocalization.

Yelling may also refer to:

- Yelling (album), a 2009 album by Kay Tse
- Yelling, Cambridgeshire, a village in England
- Yelling (surname), an English surname (and list of people with that name)
- The Yelling (band), a punk rock band from Los Angeles, California

== See also ==
- Yell (disambiguation)
