= Tennessee State Route 129 =

State highway in Tennessee, United States

State Route 129
- SR 129 highlighted in red

Route information
- Maintained by TDOT
- Length: 49.22 mi (79.21 km)

Major junctions
- West end: US 31 in Waco
- I-65 near Cornersville; US 31A in Cornersville; US 431 / SR 130 in Petersburg; US 231 north of Fayetteville
- East end: SR 55 in Lynchburg

Location
- Country: United States
- State: Tennessee
- Counties: Giles, Marshall, Lincoln, Moore

Highway system
- Tennessee State Routes; Interstate; US; State
← US 129	→ SR 130

State Route 129 (SR 129) is a 49.22-mile-long (79.21 km) east–west state highway in the hills of southern Middle Tennessee.

== Route description ==
SR 129 begins in Giles County in Waco at an intersection with US 31/SR 7. It goes east to pass through Lynnville before passing through farmland in a narrow valley to cross into Marshall County. The highway then has an interchange with I-65 (Exit 27) before winding its way hilly terrain to enter Cornersville and coming to an intersection with US 31A/SR 11. SR 129 becomes concurrent with US 31A/SR 11 and they turn south along Main Street to pass through town before SR 129 splits off and goes east through farmland to have an intersection with SR 272 in Archer. It then enters Petersburg, where it has short concurrencies with US 431/SR 50 and SR 130. The highway crosses into Lincoln County in downtown at the split with SR 130. SR 129 passes through town along Railroad Street before making a left onto Water Street to leave Petersburg and continue east through farmland. It then begins winding its way through hilly terrain to have a short concurrency with US 231/SR 10 along the Lincoln-Moore county line. The highway then crosses fully into Moore County and winds its way east through hills before entering Lynchburg and coming to an end at an intersection with SR 55 in the southern part of town. The entire route of SR 129 is a two-lane rural highway.

== Major intersections ==
County	Location	mi	km	Destinations	Notes
Giles	Waco	0.0	0.0	US 31 (Columbia Highway/SR 7) – Pulaski, Columbia	Western terminus
Marshall				I-65 – Huntsville, Nashville	I-65 exit 27
Marshall	Cornersville			US 31A north (N Main Street/SR 11 north) – Lewisburg	Western end of US 31A/SR 11 concurrency
Marshall	Cornersville			US 31A south (Sam Davis Highway/SR 11 south) – Pulaski	Eastern end of US 31A/SR 11 concurrency
Marshall	Archer			SR 272 north (Ostella Road) – Lewisburg	Southern terminus of SR 272
Marshall	Petersburg			US 431 north (Fayetteville Highway/SR 50 west) – Lewisburg	Western end of US 431/SR 50 concurrency
Marshall	Petersburg			US 431 south (Buchanan Street/SR 50 east) / SR 130 begins – Fayetteville	Eastern end of US 431/SR 50 concurrency; western terminus of SR 130; western end of SR 130 concurrency
Marshall–Lincoln county line	Petersburg			SR 130 east (N High Street) – Shelbyville	Eastern end of SR 130 concurrency
Lincoln–Moore county line				US 231 north (Shelbyville Highway/SR 10 north) – Shelbyville	Western end of US 231/SR 10 concurrency
Lincoln–Moore county line				US 231 south (Shelbyville Highway/SR 10 south) – Fayetteville	Eastern end of US 231/SR 10 concurrency
Moore	Lynchburg	49.22	79.21	SR 55 (Majors Boulevard/Fayetteville Highway) – Fayetteville, Winchester, Tullahoma	Eastern terminus
1.000 mi = 1.609 km; 1.000 km = 0.621 mi: Concurrency terminus
