= Bear Creek Cumberland Presbyterian Church =

Historic church in Tennessee, United States

- U.S. National Register of Historic Places
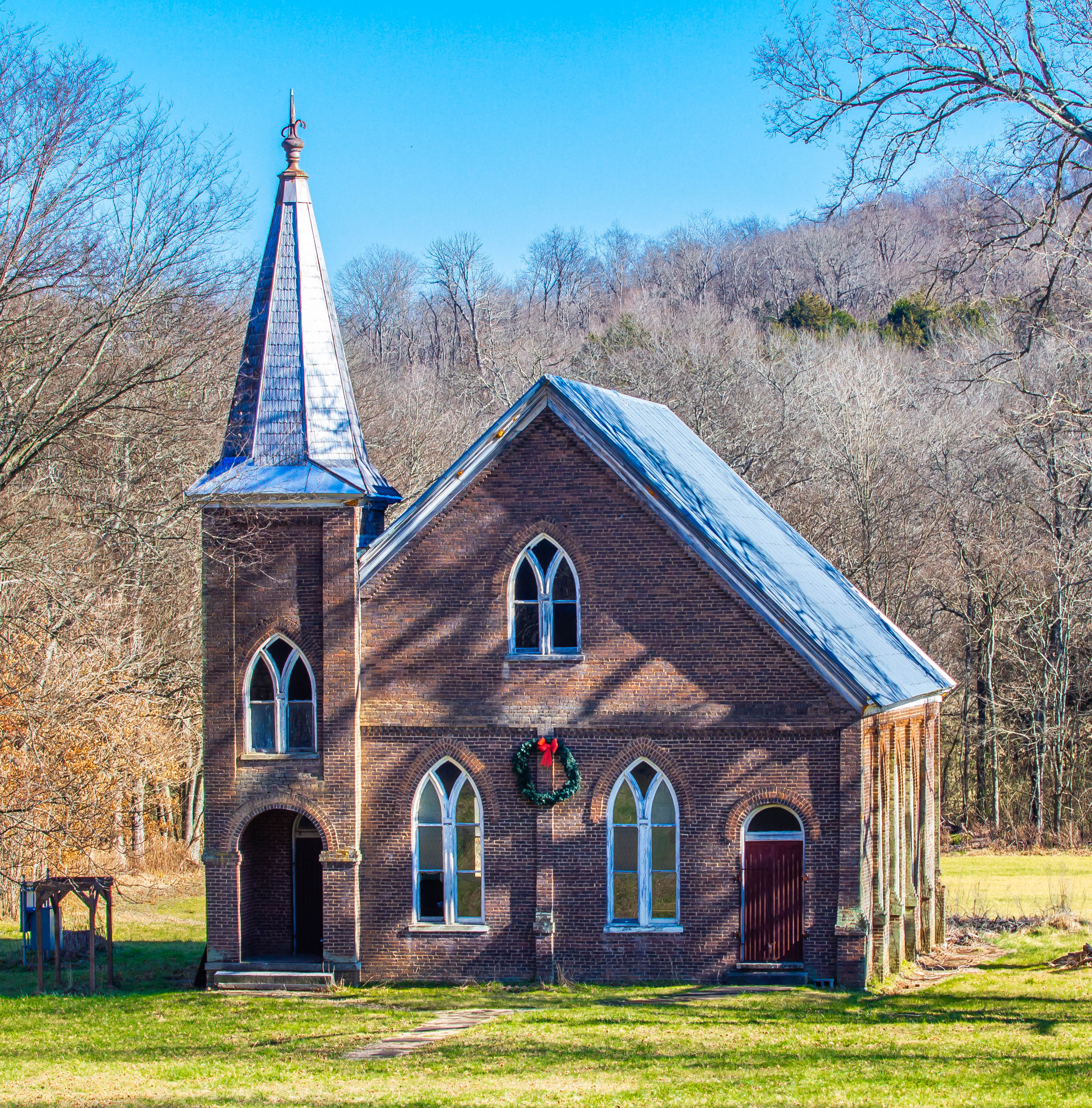
- Bear Creek Cumberland Presbyterian Church

- Location within Tennessee Location within the United States
- Nearest city: Mooresville, Tennessee
- Coordinates: 35°25′23″N 86°55′55″W
- Area: less than one acre
- Built: 1897
- NRHP reference No.: 85000667
- Added to NRHP: March 28, 1985

the Bear Creek Cumberland Presbyterian Church, also known as Bear Creek Community Church, is a historic church in an isolated rural setting in Marshall County, Tennessee, near the village of Mooresville.

The Bear Creek congregation was established in 1814. Its founder, the Reverend Samuel King, was one of the founders of the Cumberland Presbyterian denomination.

The church building is a brick structure in a vernacular Victorian design. It was built in 1897 and dedicated in 1898. It was added to the National Register of Historic Places in 1985. The church is privately owned and has experienced multiple incidents of vandalism. After this last vandalism, the church lost several of its historic windows. Alarms are being installed. It is not open to the public. Vandals will be prosecuted to the fullest extent of the law.
