= Fitzpatrick House (Mooresville, Tennessee) =

Historic house in Tennessee, United States

- U.S. National Register of Historic Places
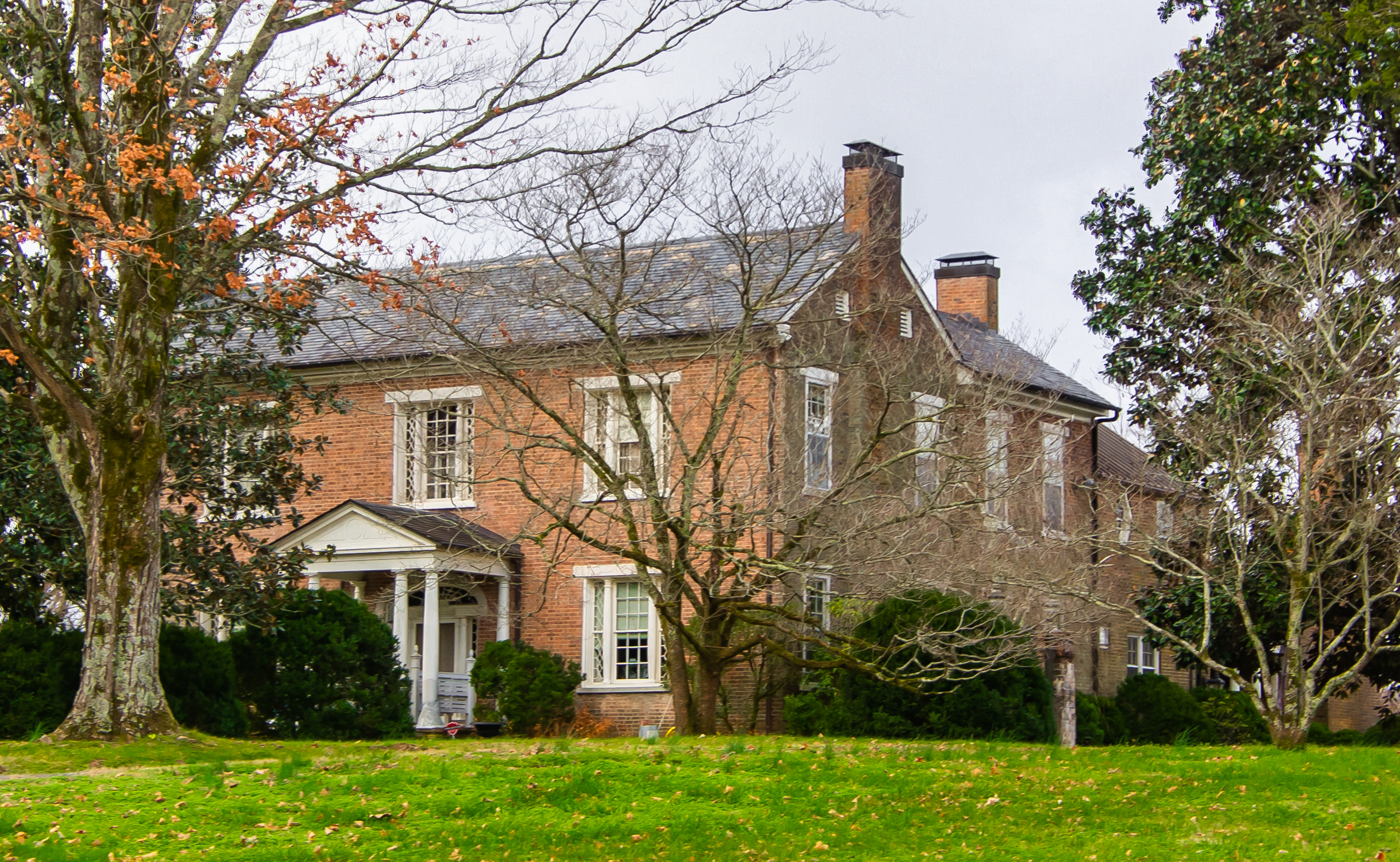

- Location within Tennessee Location within the United States
- Interactive map showing the location of Fitzpatrick House
- Location: TN 50 A Mooresville, Tennessee
- Coordinates: 35°26′30″N 86°54′54″W
- Area: 4 acres (1.6 ha)
- Built: 1832
- Architectural style: Federal
- NRHP reference No.: 82003992
- Added to NRHP: August 26, 1982

Fitzpatrick House is a historic mansion in Mooresville, Tennessee, United States.

== History ==
The mansion was built in 1832 for Morgan Fitzpatrick, a farmer who owned 150 slaves by 1860. His son, Samuel W. Fitzpatrick, served in the Confederate States Army during the American Civil War of 1861–1865, and subsequently inherited the farm. It remained in the Fitzpatrick family, except for a hiatus between 1930 and 1942. The owner from 1942 to 1965, John Paul Fitzpatrick, was "a leading pencil manufacturer with factories in Tennessee, New Jersey, and California." His son took over the business and inherited the house.

== Architectural significance ==
The house was designed in the Federal architectural style. It has been listed on the National Register of Historic Places since August 26, 1982.
