= Graball =

Graball may refer to:

- Graball, Alabama
- Graball, Tennessee (disambiguation) (multiple locations)
