= Yell =

A yell is a loud vocalization; see screaming.

Yell may also refer to:

== Places ==
=== United Kingdom ===
- Yell, Shetland, one of the North Isles of the Shetland archipelago, Scotland
- Yell Sound, Shetland, Scotland

=== United States ===
- Yell, Tennessee, an unincorporated community
- Yell County, Arkansas, territorial subdivision
- Yell Township, Boone County, Iowa

== Other ==
- Yell!, British pop duo (1989–1991)
- Yell (company), based in Britain
- Archibald Yell (1797–1847), United States general and congressman from Arkansas
- Yell (TV series), aired on NHK TV from March to September 2020.

== See also ==
- Yelling (disambiguation)
