= Mountain Messenger =

The Mountain Messenger is a newspaper published in Downieville, California.

Mountain Messenger may also refer to:

== Newspapers ==
- Mountain Messenger (Kentucky), see The Hazard Herald
- Mountain Messenger (Lewisburg), published in Lewisburg, West Virginia
- The Coal Creek Canyon Mountain Messenger, published in Jefferson County, Colorado
- The Sewanee Mountain Messenger, published in Sewanee, Tennessee
- The Searchlight, formerly The Mountain Messenger, see Harrison, Idaho

== Others ==
- Mountain Messenger, 2008 recording by Jojo Mayer
- Kings Mountain Messenger, see Joseph Greer
