= Valley Farm =

Historic house in Tennessee, United States

- U.S. National Register of Historic Places
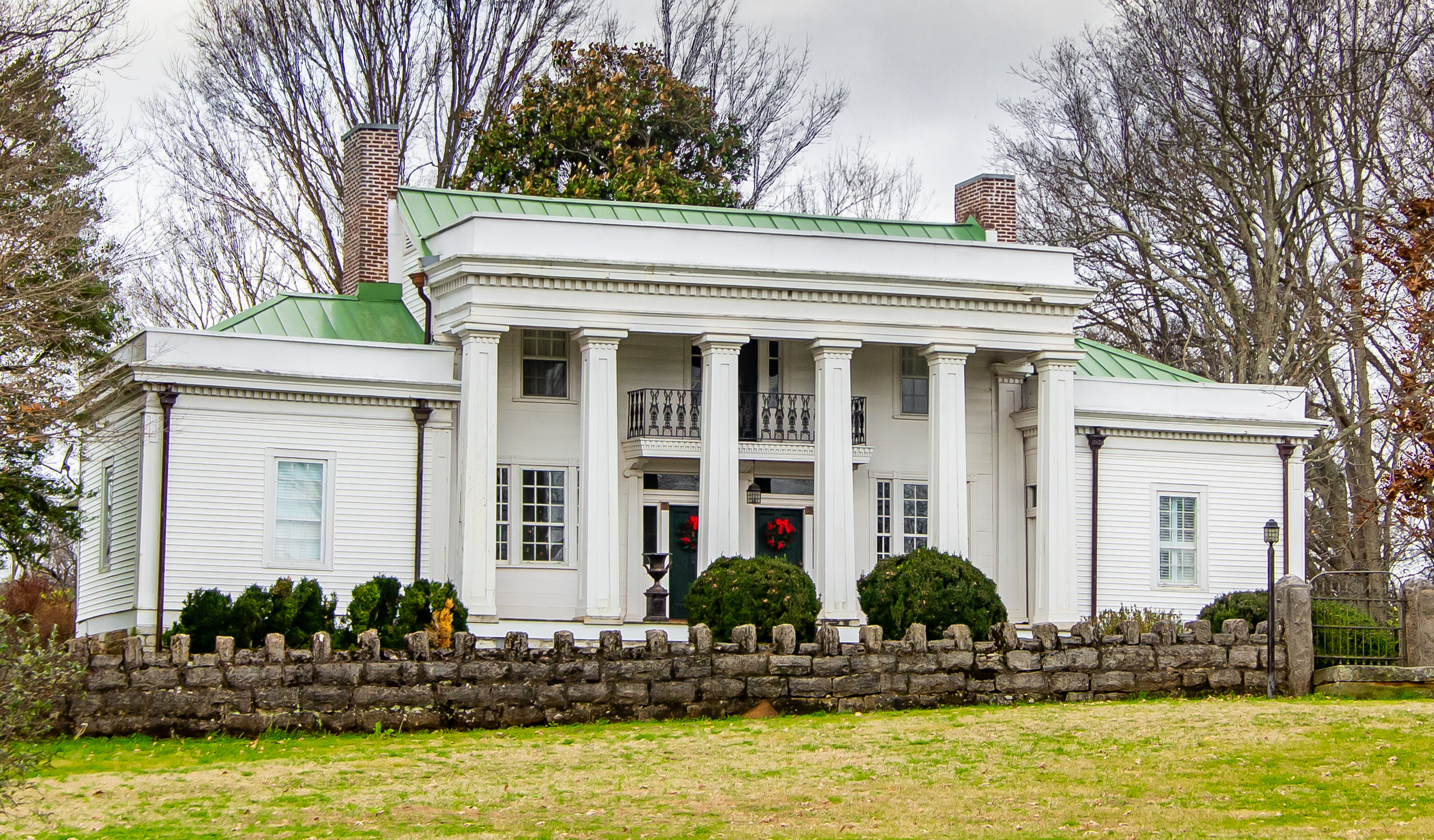

- Location within Tennessee Location within the United States
- Location: 1892 Cornersville Hwy.
- Nearest city: Cornersville, Tennessee
- Coordinates: 35°23′28″N 86°49′11″W
- Area: 6 acres (2.4 ha)
- Built: 1820
- Architectural style: Greek Revival
- NRHP reference No.: 84003616
- Added to NRHP: April 5, 1984

Valley Farm is a historic mansion and stud farm in Cornersville, Tennessee, U.S..

== History ==
The house was built in 1846 for William Lee McClelland, a farmer. On his death in 1902, it became the home of his daughter Zana McClelland Ogilvie and her husband, Waverley Wilson Ogilvie, who served as the Tennessee Secretary of Agriculture from 1903 to 1905. The Ogilvies bred horses on the farm, and passed it on to their granddaughter, Waverley Murrey Dunning.

== Architectural significance ==
The house was designed in the Greek Revival architectural style. It has been listed on the National Register of Historic places since April 5, 1984.
