= Beasley, Tennessee =

Unincorporated community in Tennessee, US

Coordinates: 35°40′48″N 86°39′07″W

Beasley is an unincorporated community in Marshall County, in the U.S. state of Tennessee.

== History ==
A post office called Beasley was established in 1880, and remained in operation until 1904. Beside post office, the community had a country store.
