= Petersburg, Tennessee =

- Town
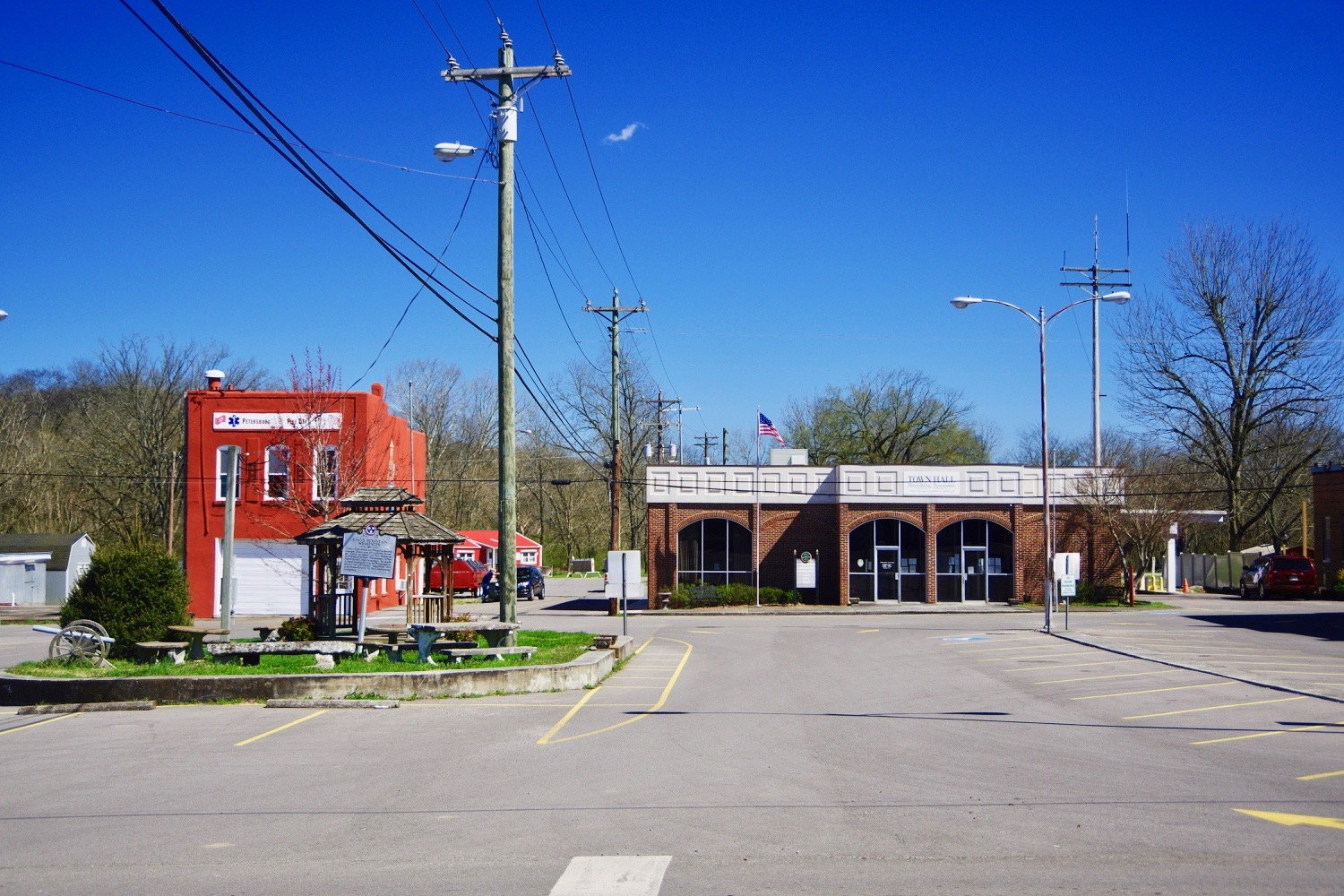
- Town Hall (right) and fire department

- Location of Petersburg in Marshall County, Tennessee.
- Coordinates: 35°19′7″N 86°38′15″W
- Country: United States
- State: Tennessee
- Counties: Lincoln, Marshall

Area
  - Total: 1.01 sq mi (2.61 km^{2})
  - Land: 1.01 sq mi (2.61 km^{2})
  - Water: 0 sq mi (0.00 km^{2})
- Elevation: 750 ft (230 m)

Population (2020)
  - Total: 528
  - Density: 523.7/sq mi (202.19/km^{2})
- Time zone: UTC-6 (Central (CST))
  - Summer (DST): UTC-5 (CDT)
- ZIP code: 37144
- Area code: 931
- FIPS code: 47-57740
- GNIS feature ID: 1297255
- Website: https://www.petersburgtn.gov/

Petersburg is a town in Lincoln and Marshall counties in the U.S. state of Tennessee. As of the 2020 census, Petersburg had a population of 528. It used to be the location of Morgan school before consolidation.

== Geography ==
Petersburg is located at 35°19′7″N 86°38′15″W (35.318501, -86.637456). The town is concentrated around a town square that lies at the intersection of Tennessee State Route 130 (SR 130), which connects the town with Shelbyville to the northeast, and Tennessee State Route 129 (SR 129), which connects the town with Cornersville to the west and Lynchburg to the east. U.S. Route 431 (US 431), which connects Petersburg with Lewisburg and Fayetteville, traverses the western part of town.

According to the United States Census Bureau, the town has a total area of 0.9 square miles (2.4 km^{2}), all land.

== Demographics ==
Historical population
| Census | Pop. | Note | %± |
|---|---|---|---|
| 1880 | 150 | | — |
| 1890 | 290 | | 93.3% |
| 1900 | 411 | | 41.7% |
| 1910 | 379 | | −7.8% |
| 1920 | 560 | | 47.8% |
| 1930 | 556 | | −0.7% |
| 1940 | 581 | | 4.5% |
| 1950 | 497 | | −14.5% |
| 1960 | 423 | | −14.9% |
| 1970 | 463 | | 9.5% |
| 1980 | 681 | | 47.1% |
| 1990 | 514 | | −24.5% |
| 2000 | 580 | | 12.8% |
| 2010 | 544 | | −6.2% |
| 2020 | 528 | | −2.9% |

=== 2020 census ===
Petersburg racial composition
| Race | Number | Percentage |
|---|---|---|
| White (non-Hispanic) | 458 | 86.74% |
| Black or African American (non-Hispanic) | 27 | 5.11% |
| Native American | 2 | 0.38% |
| Asian | 5 | 0.95% |
| Other/Mixed | 25 | 4.73% |
| Hispanic or Latino | 11 | 2.08% |

As of the 2020 United States census, there were 528 people, 227 households, and 153 families residing in the town.

=== 2000 census ===
As of the census of 2000, there were 580 people, 235 households, and 156 families residing in the town. The population density was 627.7 inhabitants per square mile (242.4/km^{2}). There were 252 housing units at an average density of 272.7 per square mile (105.3/km^{2}). The racial makeup of the town was 92.41% White, 6.03% African American, 0.17% Native American, 0.69% from other races, and 0.69% from two or more races. Hispanic or Latino of any race were 2.07% of the population.

There were 235 households, out of which 28.9% had children under the age of 18 living with them, 51.1% were married couples living together, 12.3% had a female householder with no husband present, and 33.2% were non-families. 31.1% of all households were made up of individuals, and 15.7% had someone living alone who was 65 years of age or older. The average household size was 2.47 and the average family size was 3.12.

In the town, the population was spread out, with 25.0% under the age of 18, 8.6% from 18 to 24, 27.6% from 25 to 44, 22.9% from 45 to 64, and 15.9% who were 65 years of age or older. The median age was 37 years. For every 100 females, there were 94.0 males. For every 100 females age 18 and over, there were 88.3 males.

The median income for a household in the town was $27,875, and the median income for a family was $40,714. Males had a median income of $27,500 versus $21,016 for females. The per capita income for the town was $13,898. About 8.4% of families and 15.9% of the population were below the poverty line, including 17.5% of those under age 18 and 23.1% of those age 65 or over.

== Notable people ==
- Joseph Greer (1754–;1831), Revolutionary War soldier who delivered news of the American victory at the Battle of Kings Mountain to the Continental Congress
- Hek Wakefield (1899–1962), college football player and coach who played fullback and end for the Vanderbilt Commodores of Vanderbilt University from 1921 to 1924, receiving the honor of consensus All-American in his senior year
