= Graball, Marshall County, Tennessee =

Graball, Tennessee
- Unincorporated community
- Location within Tennessee Location within the United States
- Coordinates: 35°18′33″N 86°48′31″W
- Country: United States
- State: Tennessee
- County: Marshall
- Elevation: 853 ft (260 m)
- Time zone: UTC-6 (Central (CST))
  - Summer (DST): UTC-5 (CDT)
- Area code: 931
- GNIS feature ID: 1315138

Graball is an unincorporated community in Marshall County, Tennessee, United States. Graball is located along Delina Road 4 miles (6.4 km) south-southeast of Cornersville.
