= Ewing Farm =

Historic house in Tennessee, United States

- U.S. National Register of Historic Places
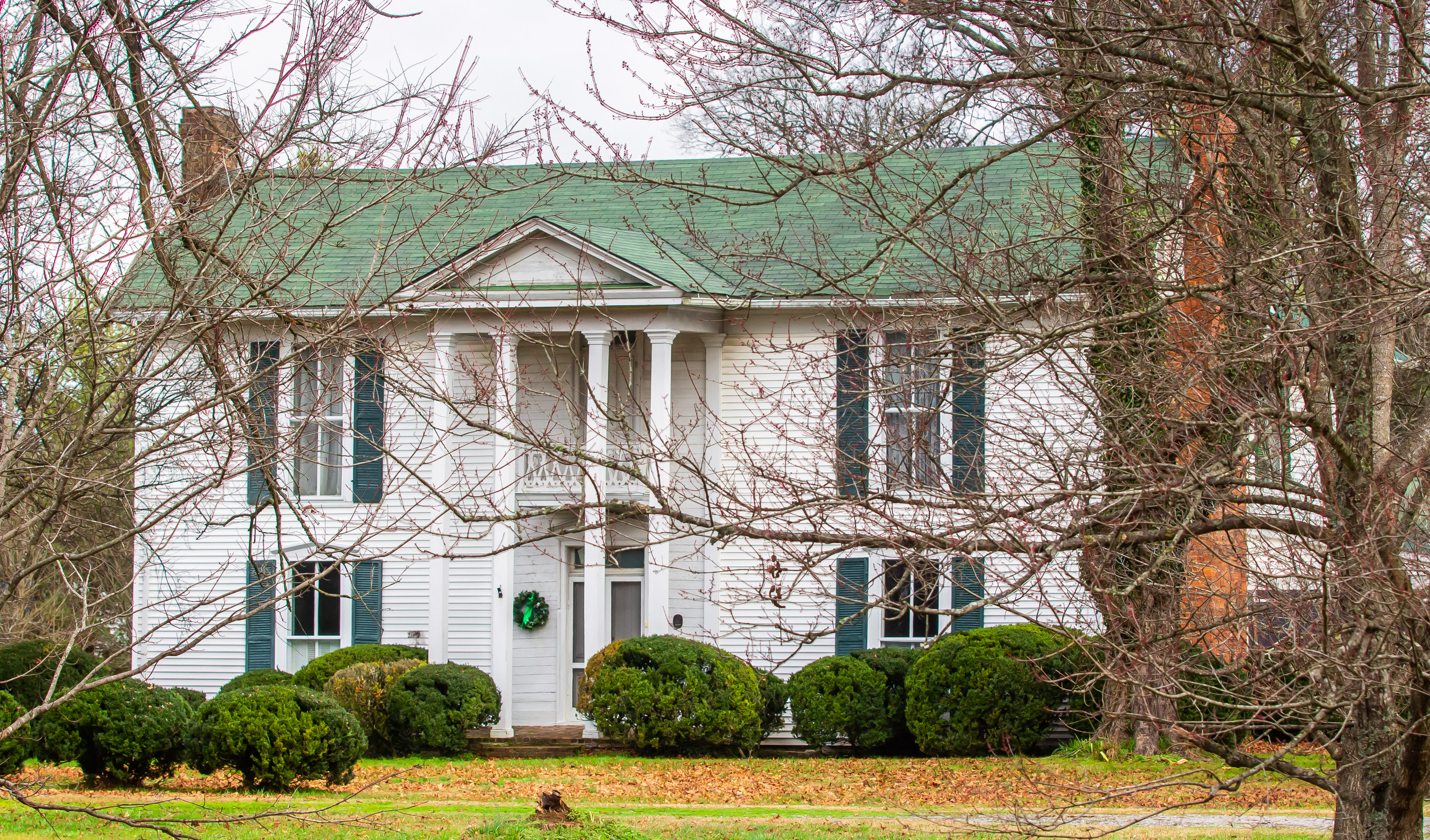

- Location within Tennessee Location within the United States
- Location: 1498 New Columbia Hwy., Lewisburg, Tennessee
- Nearest city: Lewisburg, Tennessee
- Area: 18 acres (7.3 ha)
- Built: 1830
- Architectural style: Greek Revival
- NRHP reference No.: 84003612
- Added to NRHP: April 5, 1984

Ewing Farm is a historic farmhouse three miles away from Lewisburg, Tennessee, US.

== History ==
The house was built in 1830 for James V. Ewing, a farmer who owned slaves. Aside from the great house, he built several other buildings, including slave cabins and two cemeteries. His son, John C. C. Ewing, graduated from the University of Nashville and served as a surgeon in the Confederate States Army during the American Civil War; he inherited the farm in 1878. Ewing died in 1917 and his nephew, James Oliver Ewing, purchased the property two years later, where he summered with his wife Helen White Johnson and their two daughters. It was later inherited by his daughter Helen Ewing and Jack Goodman, whose twin sons moved into the house by the 1980s.

== Architectural significance ==
The house was designed in the Greek Revival architectural style. It has been listed on the National Register of Historic Places since April 5, 1984.
