= Nathan Bedford Forrest Boyhood Home =

Historic house in Tennessee, United States

- U.S. National Register of Historic Places
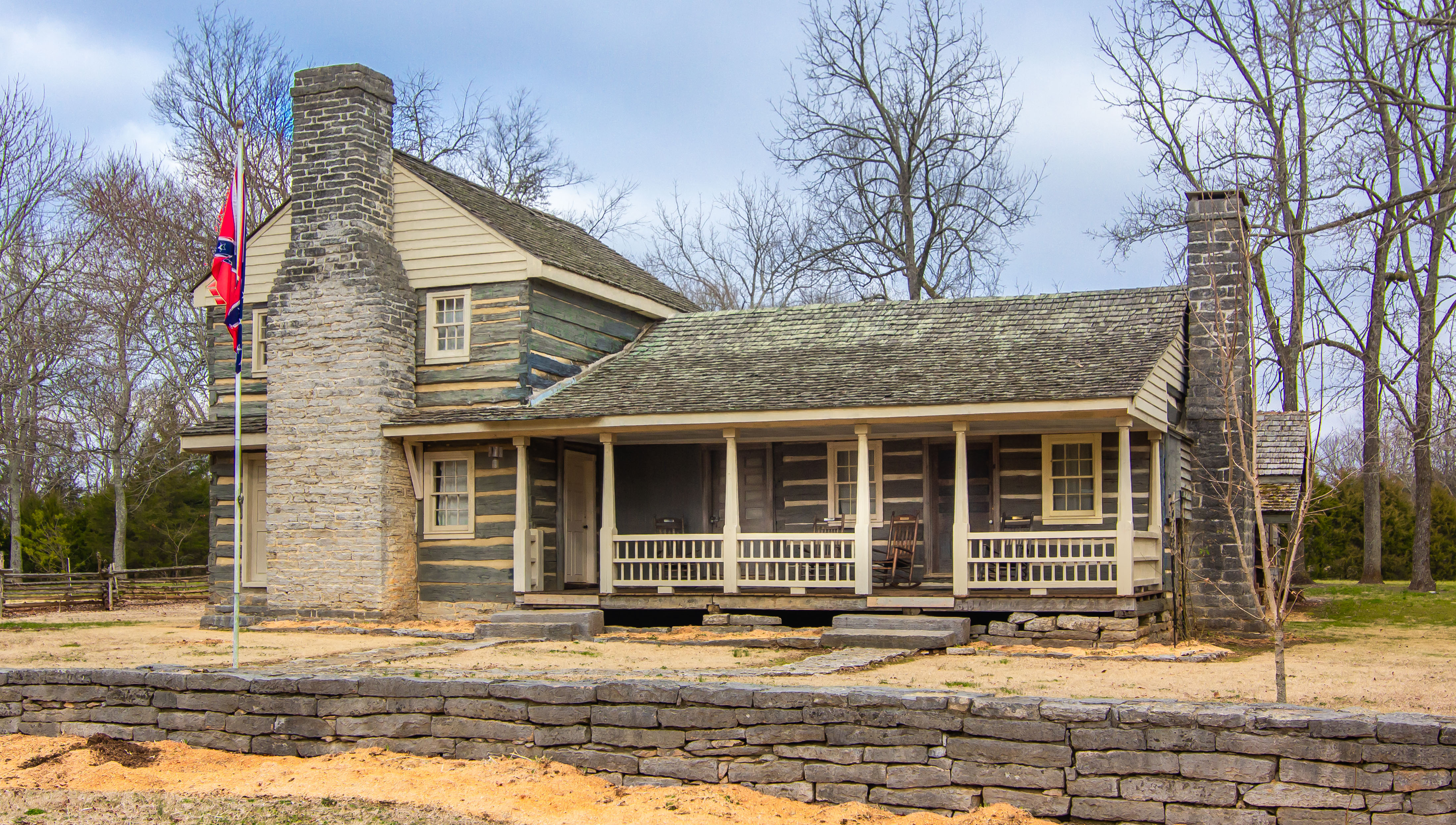

- Location within Tennessee Location within the United States
- Nearest city: Chapel Hill, Tennessee
- Coordinates: 35°38′25″N 86°45′2″W
- Area: 2 acres (0.81 ha)
- Built: 1820s
- NRHP reference No.: 77001280
- Added to NRHP: July 13, 1977

The Nathan Bedford Forrest Boyhood Home is a historic log house in Chapel Hill, Tennessee, United States. It was the childhood home of Confederate General and Ku Klux Klan Grand Wizard Nathan Bedford Forrest from 1830 to 1833. It is owned by the Sons of Confederate Veterans.

== History ==
The log house was built by W.S. Mayfield in the 1820s. William Forrest acquired the house in 1830, when his son Nathan was nine years old. The Forrests expanded the house and lived there from 1830 to 1833, when they sold it to Stephen W. Rainey. It remained a private home for the next four decades.

The house, "the only home still existing associated with Forrest" in Tennessee, was acquired by the state government in the 1970s. Since 1997, it has belonged to the Sons of Confederate Veterans (SCV). As of 2017, the "caretaker" of the house is Gene Andrews, a resident of Nashville, Tennessee, and a member of the SCV. The house may still be used for "Civil War re-enactments, music and lectures". It was the location of the music video for Josephine by Joey + Rory. However, the house is locked behind a "black metal gate".

== Architectural significance ==
The house is "highly representative" of Tennessee's vernacular architecture in the 1820s and 1830s. "While most houses in the more settled sections of the state in the 1820s were brick or frame, the farmer or craftsman of the rural areas was still likely to build with logs. Often when prosperity increased, rather than build a new and more imposing house, improvements and additions were made to the log structure."

It has been listed on the National Register of Historic Places since July 13, 1977.
