= Robertson Fork, Tennessee =

Unincorporated community in Tennessee, US

Coordinates: 35.3720206°N 86.9188925°W

Robertson Fork is an unincorporated community in Marshall County, in the U.S. state of Tennessee.

== History ==
A post office called Beside post office, the community had a country store.
