= Delina, Tennessee =

Unincorporated community in Tennessee, US

Coordinates: 35°16′04″N 86°44′10″W

Delina is an unincorporated community in Marshall County, in the U.S. state of Tennessee.

== History ==
A post office called Delina was established in 1880, and remained in operation until 1907. Beside post office, the community had a country store.
