= Joe Chase Adams House =

Historic house in Tennessee, United States

- U.S. National Register of Historic Places
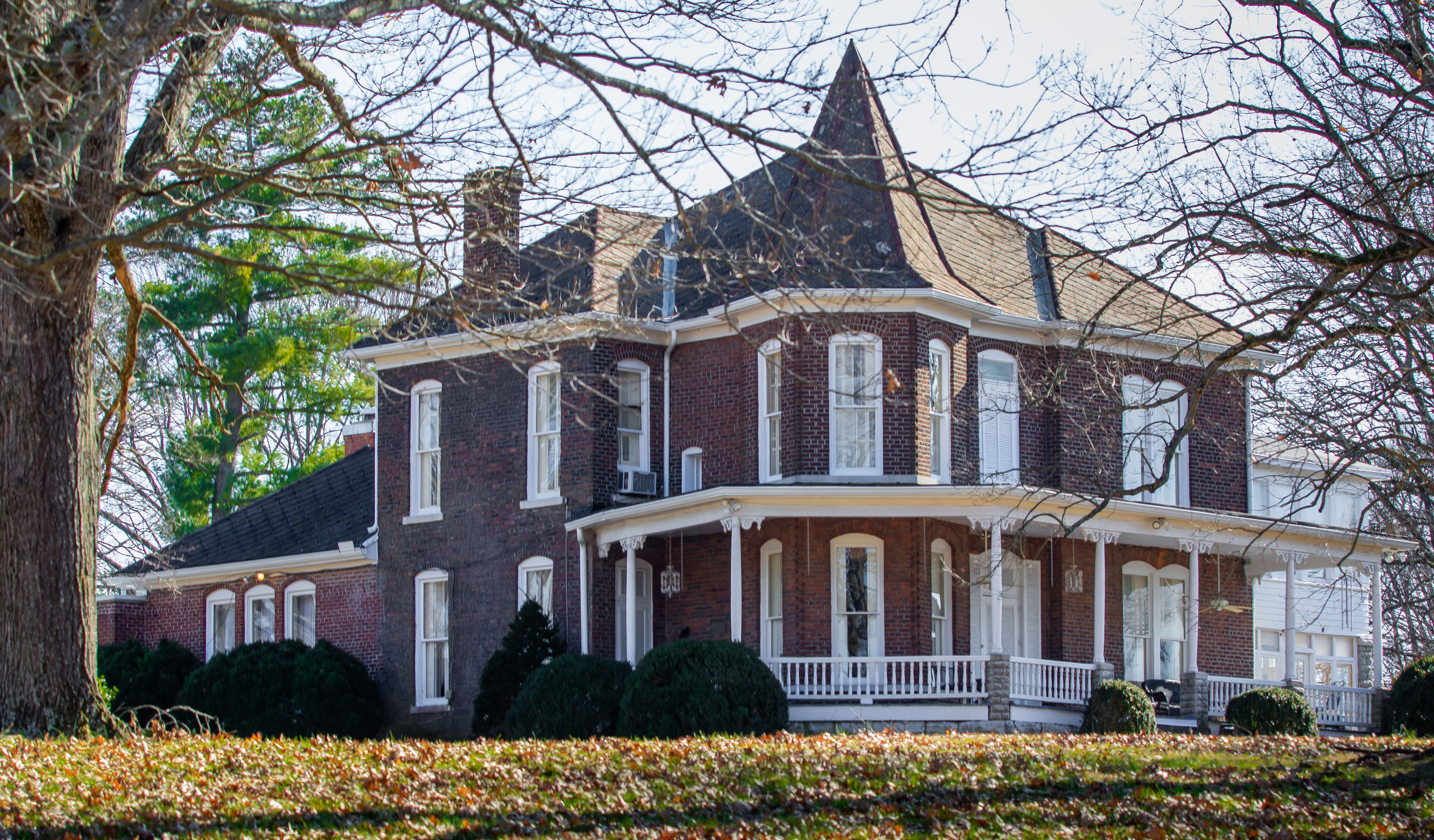
- Joe Chase Adams House

- Location within Tennessee Location within the United States
- Location: 327 East Church Street, Lewisburg, Tennessee
- Coordinates: 35°26′59″N 86°47′2″W
- Area: 3 acres (1.2 ha)
- Built: 1900
- Architectural style: Queen Anne
- NRHP reference No.: 93001354
- Added to NRHP: December 2, 1993

The Joe Chase Adams House, also known as The Ledges, is a historic house in Lewisburg, Tennessee, United States. It was built in 1900 for Joe Chase Adams, a dry goods merchant who served as the mayor of Lewisburg. It was designed in the Queen Anne architectural style. Adams's granddaughter, Mrs. Ernest Wheeler Henegar, Sr. purchased the house in 1943; she subsequently hired Bill Knox to redesign the interiors. It has been listed on the National Register of Historic Places since December 2, 1993.
