= Cornersville United Methodist Church =

Historic church in Tennessee, United States

- Cornersville Methodist Episcopal Church South
- U.S. National Register of Historic Places
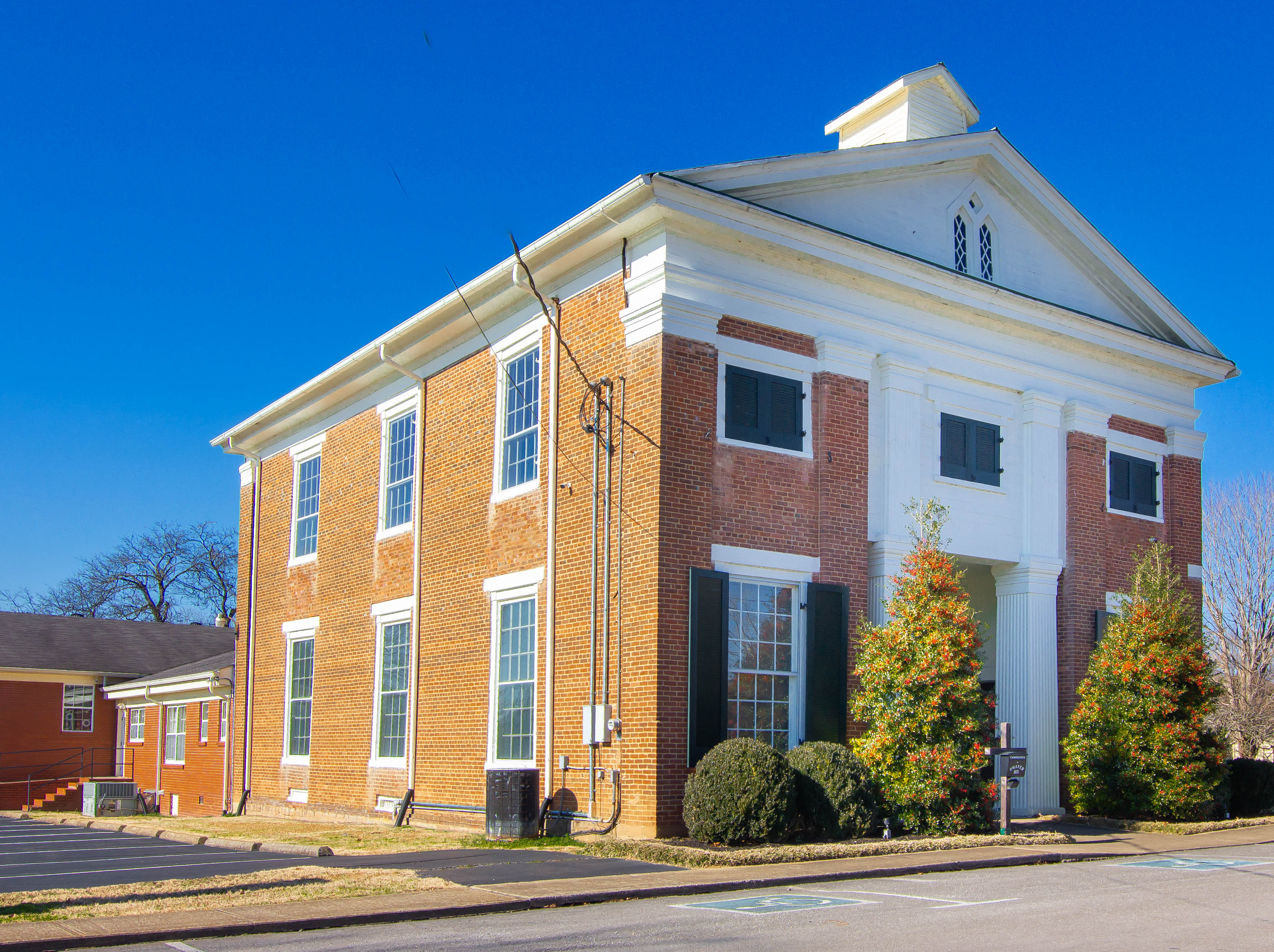
- Cornersville Methodist Episcopal Church

- Location within Tennessee Location within the United States
- Location: 100 S. Mulberry St., Cornersville, Tennessee
- Coordinates: 35°21′43″N 86°50′29″W
- Area: less than one acre
- Built: 1852
- Architectural style: Greek Revival
- NRHP reference No.: 82003991
- Added to NRHP: April 15, 1982

Cornersville United Methodist Church, formerly Cornersville Methodist Episcopal Church South, is a historic church at 100 S. Mulberry Street in Cornersville, Tennessee.

The church's brick building was completed in 1852. Its lower story was designed for religious use and the upper story was designed for Masonic meetings; the Masons relinquished their meeting space to the church in 1939. In October 1862, the church hosted the Tennessee Annual Conference of its Methodist denomination because Civil War hostilities made it unsafe to meet in Nashville. A fellowship hall was added in 1956. The church building was listed on the National Register of Historic Places in 1982.
