= Verona United Methodist Church =

Historic church in Tennessee, United States

- Verona Methodist Episcopal Church, South
- U.S. National Register of Historic Places
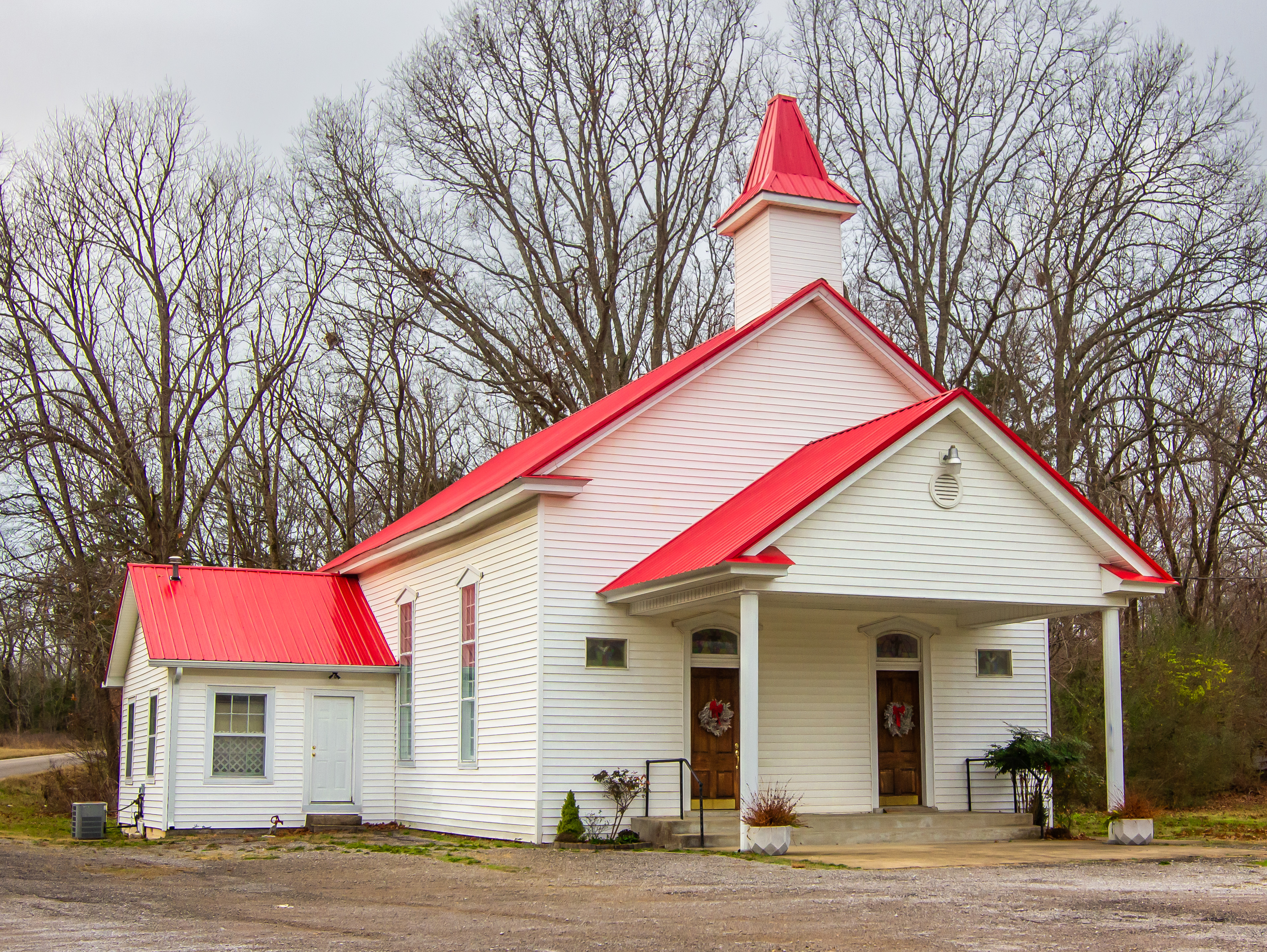

- Location within Tennessee Location within the United States
- Location: 724 John Lunn Rd., Verona, Tennessee
- Coordinates: 35°31′46″N 86°46′21″W
- Area: 1 acre (0.40 ha)
- Built: 1880
- Architectural style: Vernacular Chapel
- NRHP reference No.: 85002755
- Added to NRHP: November 07, 1985

Verona United Methodist Church, originally Verona Methodist Episcopal Church, South, is a historic church on Verona-Berlin Road in the Verona community of Marshall County, Tennessee.

The church was founded and built in about 1880 as one of two successors to the former Cave Spring Methodist Church, which had been built in the 1840s or 1850s. The Cave Spring church closed and its congregation was divided to form new churches in Farmington and Verona. After the Cave Spring Church was torn down, some of its materials were recovered for use in the new Verona church. The pews and bell from the Cave Spring church were installed in the Verona church. A wooden cross that hangs in the Verona church was made from the cedar door-steps of the Cave Spring church.

The church building was expanded in the 1930s and the 1950s, when Sunday School rooms were added. The building was added to the National Register of Historic Places in 1985.

For many years, the church shared a pastor with the Berlin, Caney Spring, and Farmington United Methodist churches. The Farmington church was administratively separated from the others in 2003. The Verona United Methodist church closed in 2011.

The church is now called Reformed Baptist Fellowship.
