= Silver Creek, Tennessee =

Unincorporated community in Tennessee, US

Coordinates: 35°30′07″N 86°52′29″W

Silver Creek is an unincorporated community in Marshall and Maury counties, in the U.S. state of Tennessee. A variant name was "Silvercreek".

== History ==
A post office called Silver Creek was established in 1860, and remained in operation until 1935. Besides the post office, the community had a country store.
