= Graball, Tennessee =

Graball, Tennessee may refer to the following places in Tennessee:

- Graball, Gibson County, Tennessee, an unincorporated community
- Graball, Marshall County, Tennessee, an unincorporated community
- Graball, Sumner County, Tennessee, a census-designated place
