= Cochran, Tennessee =

Unincorporated community in Tennessee, US

Coordinates: 35°25′23″N 86°48′06″W

Cochran is an unincorporated community in Marshall County, in the U.S. state of Tennessee.

== History ==
A post office called Cochran was established in 1882, and remained in operation until 1901. Beside post office, the community had a country store.
