= Holts Corner, Tennessee =

Human settlement in Tennessee, United States

Coordinates: 35°41′33″N 86°41′36″W

Holts Corner is an unincorporated community in Marshall County, in the U.S. state of Tennessee.

== History ==
Variant names were "Holtland" and "Holts Corners". A post office called Holts Corners was established in 1856, the name was changed to Holts Corner in 1886, and the post office closed in 1905. Besides the post office, the community once had two country stores.
