= Rich Creek, Tennessee =

Unincorporated community in Tennessee, US

Coordinates: 35°34′02″N 86°42′01″W

Rich Creek is an unincorporated community in Marshall County, in the U.S. state of Tennessee. A variant name was "Richcreek".

== History ==
A post office called Rich Creek was established in 1872, and remained in operation until 1904. Besides the post office, the community had a country store.
