= Yell, Tennessee =

- Unincorporated community
- Location within Tennessee Location within the United States
- Coordinates: 35°22′9″N 86°47′13″W
- Country: United States
- State: Tennessee
- County: Marshall
- Elevation: 902 ft (275 m)
- Time zone: UTC-6 (Central (CST))
  - Summer (DST): UTC-5 (CDT)
- GNIS feature ID: 1314546

Yell is an unincorporated community in Marshall County, in the U.S. state of Tennessee.

== History ==
A post office called Yell was established in 1882, and remained in operation until 1904. The community has the name of Archibald Yell, who fell at the Battle of Buena Vista.
