= Caney Spring, Tennessee =

Unincorporated community in Tennessee, US

Coordinates: 35°36′26″N 86°45′47″W

Caney Spring is an unincorporated community in Marshall County, in the U.S. state of Tennessee.

== History ==
Variant names were "Caney Springs" and "Caneyspring". A post office called Caney Spring was established in 1836, the name was changed to Caneyspring in 1894, and the post office closed in 1936. Besides the post office, the community once had two country stores.
