= Swaim House (Chapel Hill, Tennessee) =

Historic house in Tennessee, United States

- U.S. National Register of Historic Places
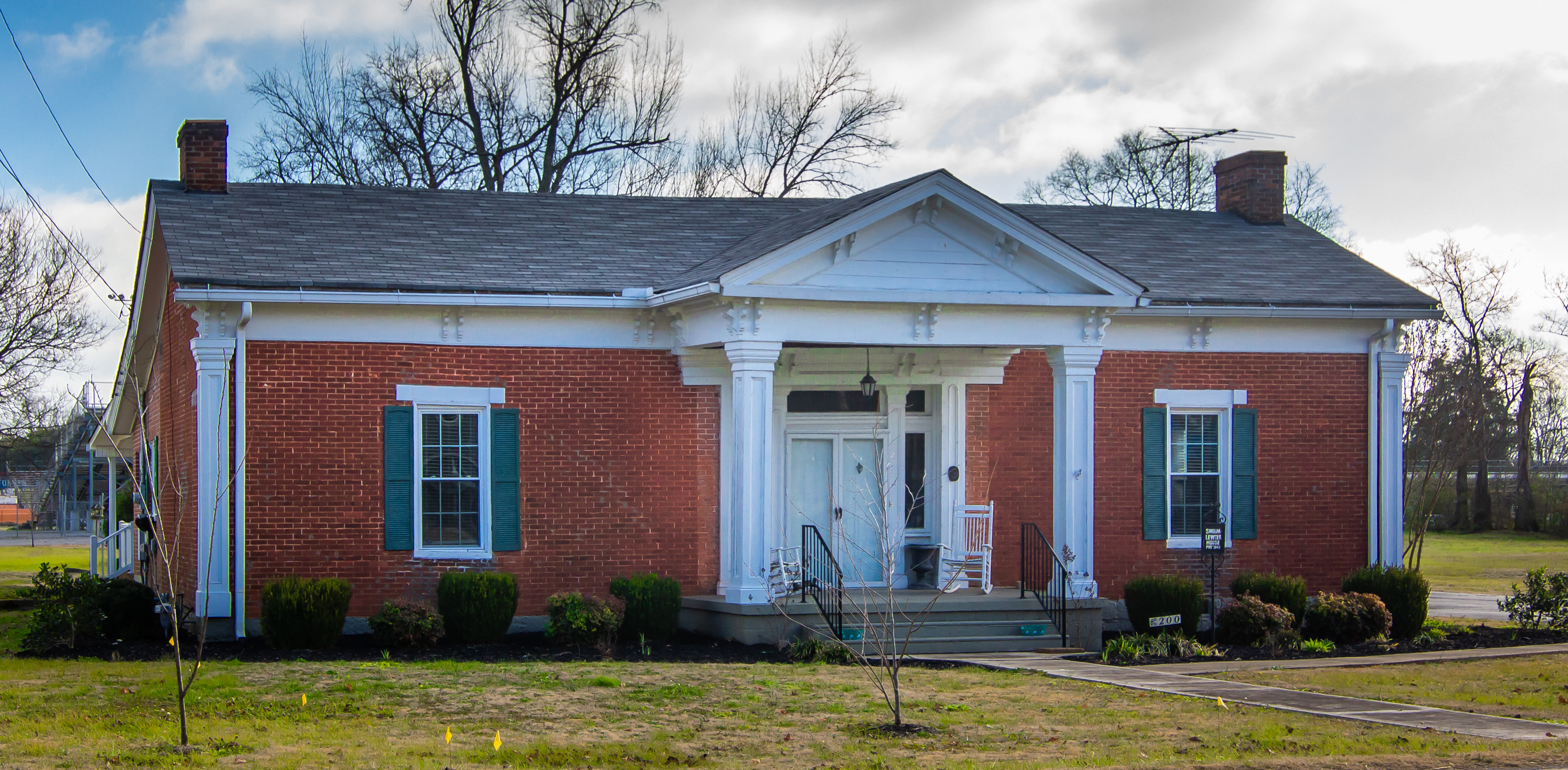
- Swaim House

- Location within Tennessee Location within the United States
- Location: 200 N. Horton Pkwy Chapel Hill, Tennessee
- Coordinates: 35°37′37″N 86°41′34″W
- Area: 1.7 acres (0.69 ha)
- Built: 1845
- Architectural style: Greek Revival
- NRHP reference No.: 84003613
- Added to NRHP: July 12, 1984

The Swaim House is a historic house in Chapel Hill, Tennessee, U.S.. It was built in the 1840s, and designed in the Greek Revival architectural style. It belonged to James Fulton, E. G. Forrest, William Turner and J.F. Brittain until J. M. Swain purchased it in 1893. It remained in the Swaim family until the 1980s, when his great-granddaughter Joy Lewter was the homeowner. The house was extended over the years, with the addition of a rear shed circa 1945 and a garage in 1982. It has been listed on the National Register of Historic Places since July 12, 1984.
