= South Berlin, Tennessee =

Unincorporated community in Tennessee, US

Coordinates: 35°30′02″N 86°50′12″W

South Berlin is an unincorporated community in Marshall County, in the U.S. state of Tennessee.

== History ==
South Berlin had its start when the railroad was extended to that point. A post office called South Berlin was established in 1878, and remained in operation until 1919.
