= Joseph Greer =

American messenger and frontiersman (1754–1831)

- Born: 8 August 1754; Philadelphia
- Died: February 23, 1831 (aged 76); Petersburg, Tennessee
- Other names: Kings Mountain Messenger
- Known for: Delivering word of America's victory over the British at Kings Mountain
- Spouse: Mary Ann Harmon

Joseph Greer (8 August 1754 – 23 February 1831), known as the Kings Mountain Messenger, was an American frontiersman best known for his delivery of the message of victory against the British at the Battle of Kings Mountain to the Continental Congress in 1780 during the American Revolutionary War.

== Life ==
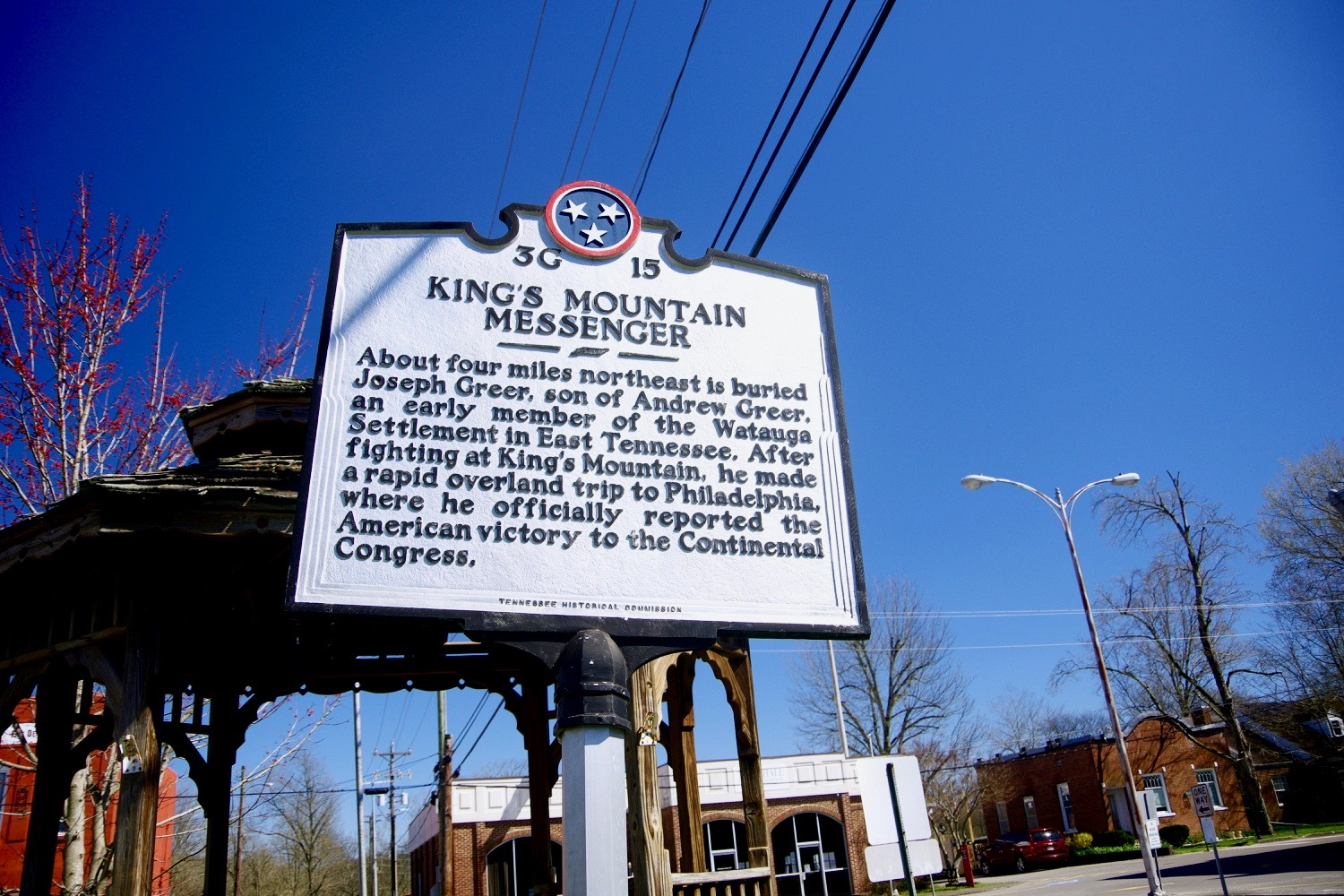
THC marker dedicated to Greer in Petersburg

Greer was born in Philadelphia on August 8, 1754, to parents Andrew and Ruth Greer. Early in his life, his family moved to Staunton, Virginia. By 1780, Greer had gained a reputation as an able Indian trader, and his knowledge of the Appalachian back country was one of the reasons he was chosen as messenger to the Continental Congress following the American victory at Kings Mountain.

After the war, he used his land grant obtained for service in the Revolution to purchase several thousand acres of land in the Cane Creek Valley in the vicinity of what is now the town of Petersburg in Lincoln County. Beginning in the 1780s, Greer operated store in Knoxville (which at the time was the capital of Tennessee), and served as a clerk on the Court of Equity from 1799 to 1801. He frequently corresponded with George Wilson, publisher of the Knoxville Gazette. By 1804, Greer had sold his business in Knoxville and moved to his farm in the Cane Creek Valley.

== Death ==
Greer died from pneumonia in 1831 at age 76. He was buried in the Old Unity Graveyard on the Greer farm.
