= Milltown, Tennessee =

- Unincorporated community
- Location within Tennessee Location within the United States
- Coordinates: 35°35′02″N 86°47′12″W
- Country: United States
- State: Tennessee
- County: Marshall
- Elevation: 656 ft (200 m)
- Time zone: UTC-6 (Central (CST))
  - Summer (DST): UTC-5 (CDT)
- Area code: 931
- GNIS feature ID: 1315516

Milltown, Tennessee is an unincorporated community in Marshall County, Tennessee, United States.

It is the location of, or nearest community to, the former Lillard's Mill Hydroelectric Station, at McLean Rd. and Duck River, which is listed on the National Register of Historic Places.
