= Henry Horton State Park =

State park in Tennessee, United States

Coordinates: 35°35′35″N 86°42′5″W

- Sign at the entrance of Henry Horton State Park
- Interactive map of Henry Horton State Park
- Type: Tennessee State Park
- Location: Chapel Hill, Tennessee
- Area: 1,523 acres (6.16 km^{2})
- Operator: Tennessee Department of Environment and Conservation
- Status: open year round
- Website: Official website

Henry Horton State Park is a state park located near Chapel Hill, Tennessee. It was constructed in the 1960s on the estate of the former Governor of Tennessee Henry Horton. The park offers various outdoor recreational activities.

== History ==
Henry Horton State Park was officially dedicated to Tennessee's 42nd Governor, Buford Ellington, on Labor Day in 1962. The park is located on the Duck River, and includes an area of approximately 1000 acres, previously owned by the park's namesake, Henry Horton, who was the 36th Governor of Tennessee. The park is managed and maintained by the Tennessee Department of Environment and Conservation.

== Facilities ==
=== Lodging ===
- Horton Park Inn - 65 rooms and 4 suites
- Cabins - 8 total cabins within walking distance to Inn
- Campgrounds - 75 campsites, some located near the Duck River

=== Meeting/Conference ===
- Recreation Building - 3,150 sq ft (293 m^{2}) of meeting space is located in a separate building near the inn, capable of holding up to 300 people.

There are additional meeting rooms in the inn and restaurant.

=== Picnic ===
There are 83 picnic sites and 4 large group picnic pavilions (that can hold up to 125 people) located near the Duck River.

=== Camping ===
Henry Horton State Park has 75 campsites situated on the Duck River; 19 of these are primitive tent sites, while the remaining 56 sites are RV sites. A large group tent camp site is also available. Two bathhouses are available seasonally.

=== Professional Trap and Skeet Range ===
There are five skeet fields, two trap fields, and a lodge building with concessions, gun rental, and ammo. A picnic shelter is available for large shoots or related gatherings.

=== Sports Fields ===
The park includes sports facilities for baseball, basketball, disc golf, tennis, and volleyball.

=== Swimming ===
The park has an Olympic-sized pool with bathhouses and a concession stand. There is also water access to the Duck River via a small ramp.

=== Fishing ===
The following fish have been known to be caught in the park: largemouth and smallmouth bass, red-eye, and catfish. A Tennessee fishing license is required to fish in the park.

=== Trails ===
The park features four hiking trails, some with views overlooking the Duck River.

- The 1.3 mile Hickory Ridge Loop is located near the campground and traverses habitats ranging from oak-hickory forest to cedar glades.
- The 0.7 mile Wilhoite Mill Trail follows the Duck River among second growth woods covering an early mill community.
- The 1.7 mile Turkey Trail loop is the longest trail in the park. It winds through woods and old fields.
- The 4.2 mile Duck River Trail is the newest trail in the park, completed in 2011.

=== BlueCross ===
First BlueCross Healthy placed opened for public at Henry Horton State Park in 2020 by BlueCross Shield Foundation of Tennessee with investment of $600,000. This space features inclusive play areas for kids of age 2-5 and 5-12 years.

== Golf ==
The park contains the Buford Ellington Golf Course.
