= Rich Creek (Bluestone River tributary) =

Stream in West Virginia

Coordinates: 37°26′40″N 81°07′17″W

Rich Creek is a stream in the U.S. state of West Virginia. It is a tributary of the Bluestone River.

Rich Creek was named for the rich soil of its river valley.

== See also ==
- List of rivers of West Virginia
