= Yelling (surname) =

Yelling is an English surname. Notable people with the surname include:

- Hayley Yelling (born 1974), British runner
- Liz Yelling (born 1974), British runner, sister-in-law of Hayley

== See also ==
- Yellin
