= Verona, Tennessee =

Unincorporated community in Tennessee, US

Coordinates: 35°31′50″N 86°46′11″W

Verona is an unincorporated community in Marshall County, in the U.S. state of Tennessee. The is located along State Route 272 (Verona Caney Road) approximately 7.2 miles (11.6 km) northeast of downtown Lewisburg.

== History ==
Verona was originally called Tyrone, and under the latter name was laid out in 1859. A post office named Tyrone was established in 1858, the name was changed to Verona in 1866, and the post office closed in 1907.

The Verona United Methodist Church was listed on the National Register of Historic Places in 1985.
