= Mooresville, Tennessee =

Unincorporated community in Tennessee, US

Coordinates: 35°26′24″N 86°54′51″W

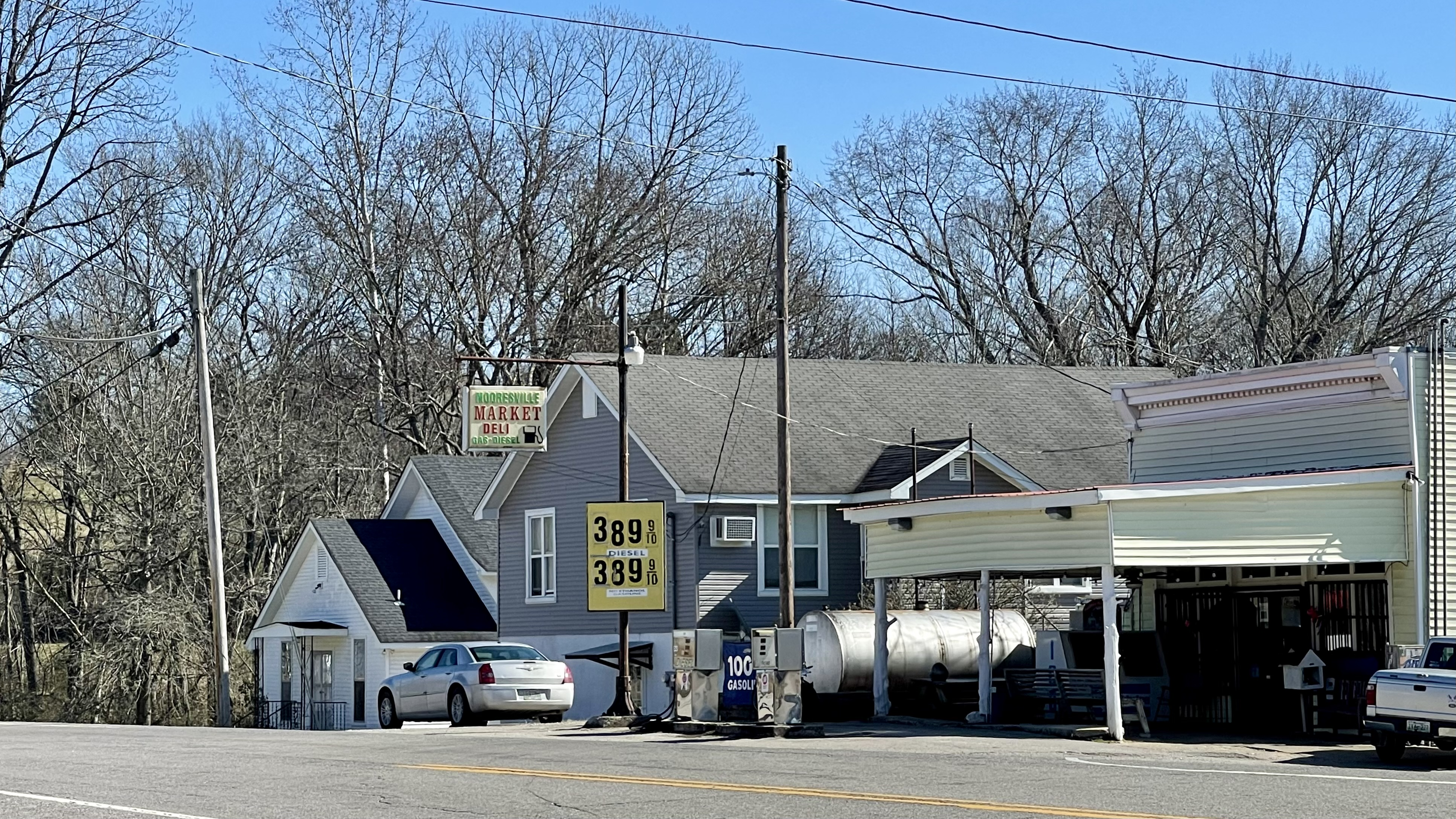
Downtown Mooresville February 2022

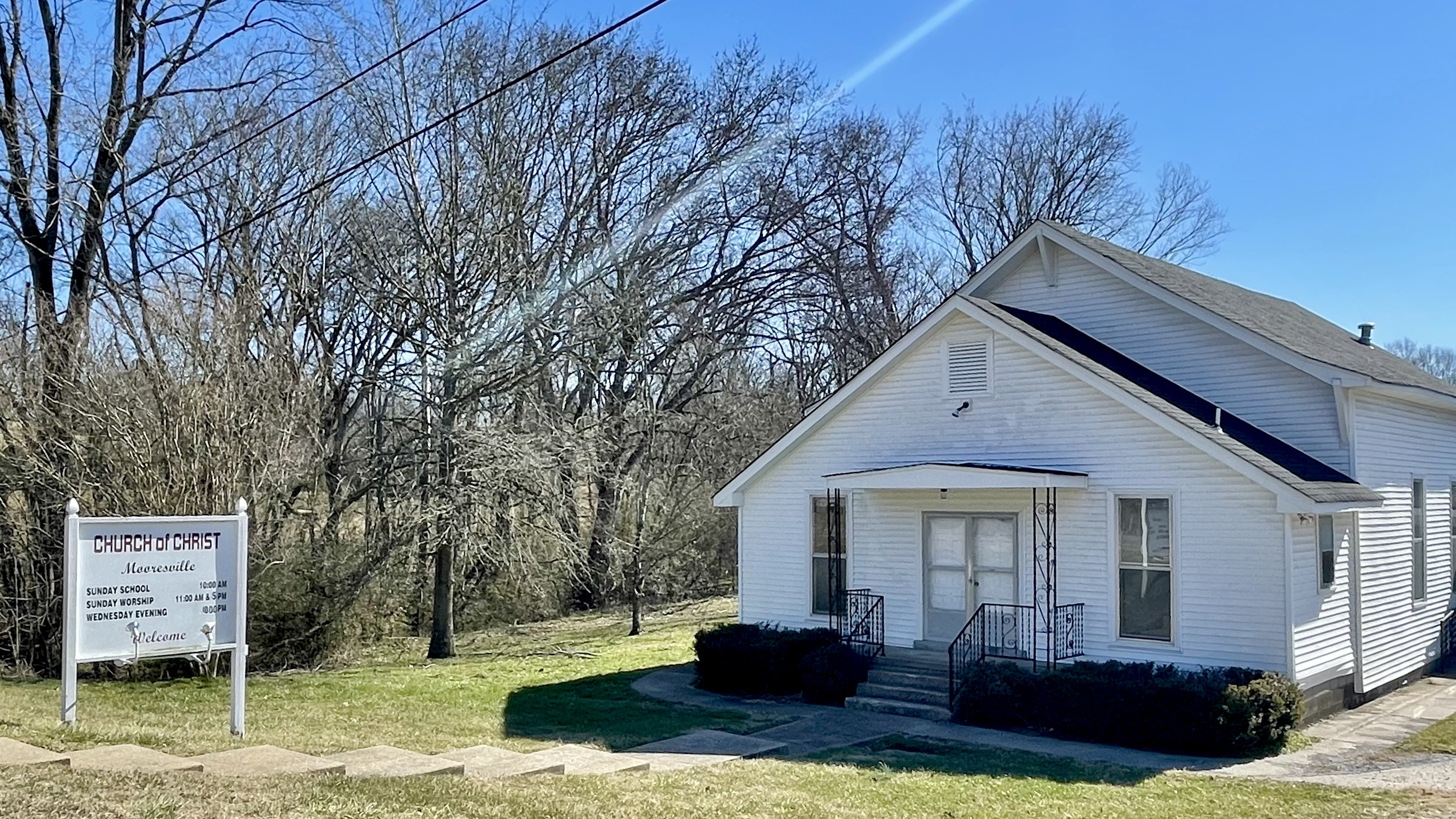
Mooresville Church of Christ

Mooresville is an unincorporated community in Marshall County, in the U.S. state of Tennessee.

== History ==
A post office called Mooresville was established in 1836, and remained in operation until 1902. The community has the name of Ashley Moore, a pioneer settler.
