= Marshall County, Tennessee =

County in Tennessee, United States

- County
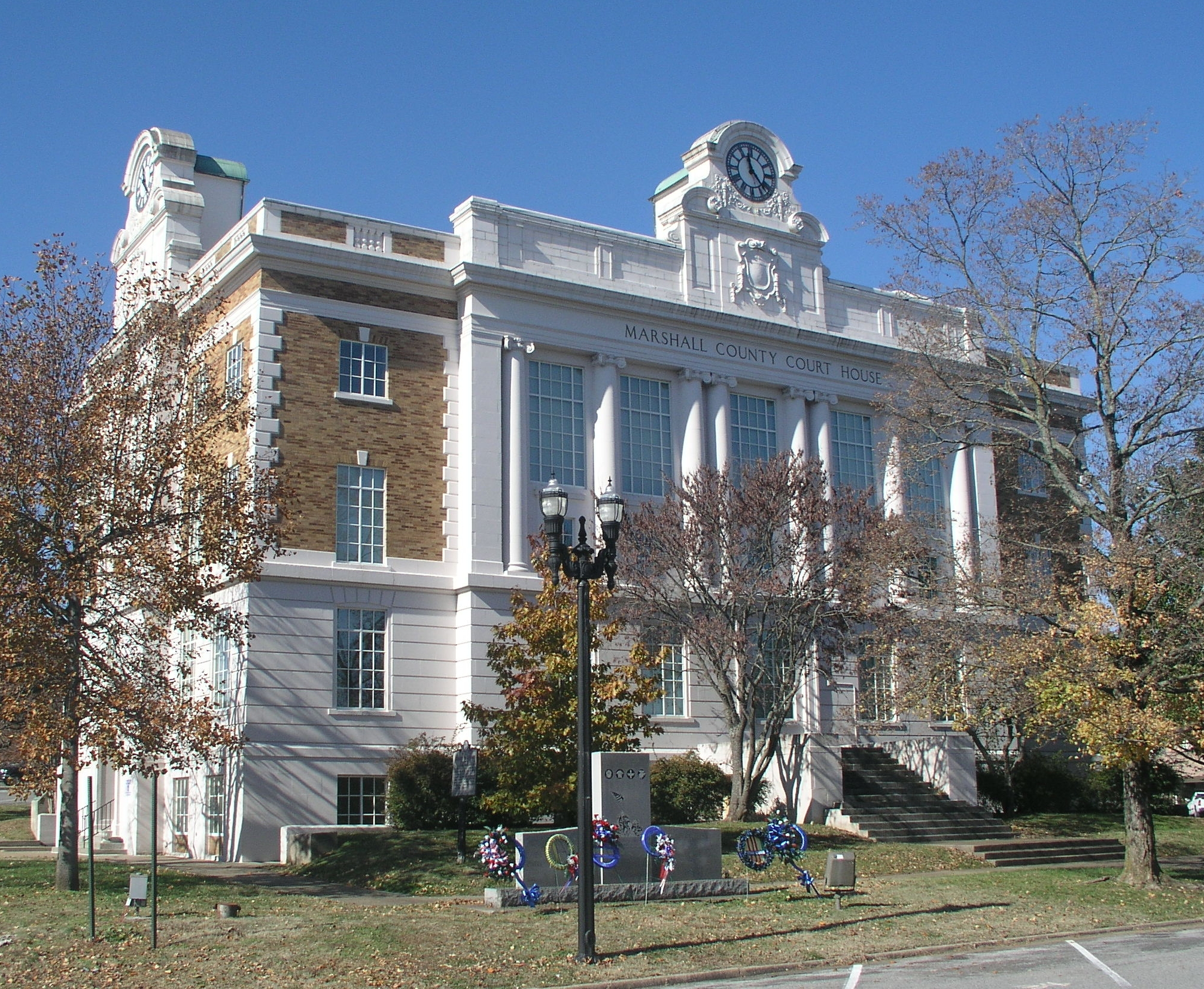
- Marshall County Courthouse in Lewisburg

- Location within the U.S. state of Tennessee
- Coordinates: 35°28′N 86°46′W
- Country: United States
- State: Tennessee
- Founded: February 20, 1836
- Named for: John Marshall
- Seat: Lewisburg
- Largest city: Lewisburg

Area
  - Total: 376 sq mi (970 km^{2})
  - Land: 375 sq mi (970 km^{2})
  - Water: 0.7 sq mi (1.8 km^{2}) 0.2%

Population (2020)
  - Total: 34,318
  - Estimate (2025): 38,071 ▲
  - Density: 91.5/sq mi (35.3/km^{2})
- Time zone: UTC−6 (Central)
  - Summer (DST): UTC−5 (CDT)
- Congressional district: 5th
- Website: marshallcountytn.gov

Marshall County is a county located in the U.S. state of Tennessee. As of the 2020 census, the population was 34,318. Its county seat is Lewisburg. Marshall County comprises the Lewisburg Micropolitan Statistical Area, which is also included in the Nashville-Davidson–Murfreesboro–Franklin, TN Metropolitan Statistical Area. It is in Middle Tennessee, one of the three Grand Divisions of the state.

The Tennessee Walking Horse Breeders' and Exhibitors' Association is based here. In addition, the fainting goat is another animal breed developed here. To celebrate this unique breed, the county holds an annual festival known as "Goats, Music and More," drawing visitors from around the world.

== History ==
Marshall County was created in 1836 from parts of Giles, Bedford, Lincoln, and Maury counties. It was named after the American jurist John Marshall, Chief Justice of the Supreme Court of the United States.

The economy was based on agriculture in the antebellum years and well into the twentieth century. Planters had depended on the labor of enslaved African Americans to work the commodity crops of tobacco and hemp, as well as care for thoroughbred horses and other quality livestock. The breed known as the Tennessee Walking Horse was developed here.

After the war, blacks and whites struggled to adjust to emancipation and a free labor market. Freedmen founded Needmore as a community in Marshall County after the Civil War where they could live as neighbors and be relatively free of white supervision.

Whites committed violence against freedmen to re-establish and maintain dominance after the war. In the period after Reconstruction and into the early 20th century, whites in Marshall County committed eight lynchings of African Americans. This was the fifth-highest total of any county in the state, but three other counties, including two nearby, also had eight lynchings each.

Among these lynchings were the murders of John Milligan (also spelled Millikin) and John L. Hunter in the Needmore settlement near the county seat of Lewisburg in August 1903. Governor James B. Frazier offered a reward for information, as Whitecaps were blamed for the deaths, and the state was trying to eliminate this secret, vigilante group. In the early 20th century, numerous African Americans left the county during the period of the Great Migration to northern and midwestern industrial cities for work.

Three Tennessee governors—Henry Horton, Jim Nance McCord, and Buford Ellington—were each living in Marshall County at the time of their election as governor.

== Geography ==
According to the U.S. Census Bureau, the county has a total area of 376 square miles (970 km^{2}), of which 375 square miles (970 km^{2}) is land and 0.7 square miles (1.8 km^{2}) (0.2%) is water. The Duck River drains much of the county.

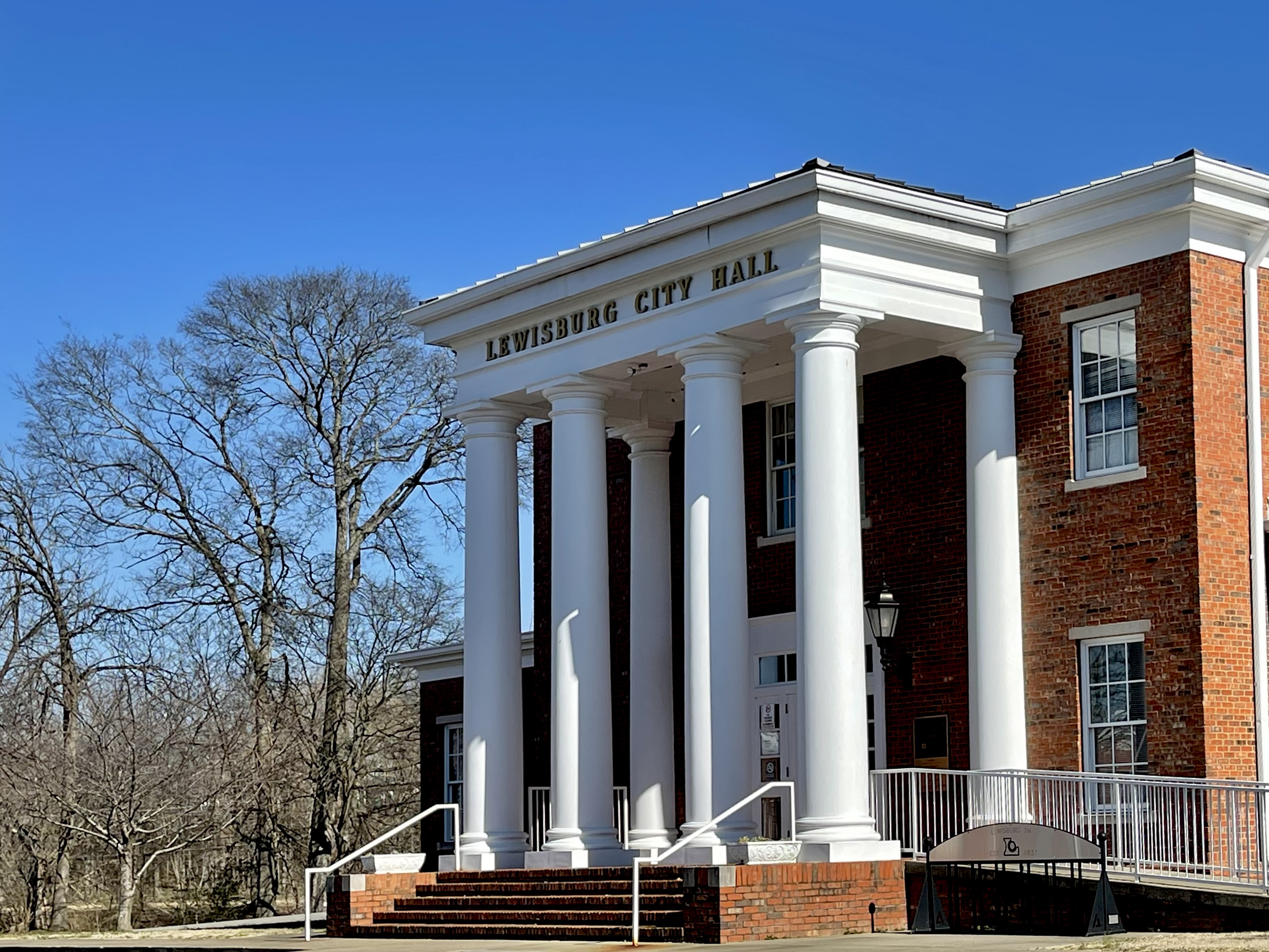
Lewisburg City Hall

=== Adjacent counties ===
- Rutherford County (northeast)
- Bedford County (east)
- Lincoln County (southeast)
- Giles County (southwest)
- Maury County (west)
- Williamson County (northwest)

=== State protected areas ===
- Henry Horton State Park
- Wilson School Road Forest and Cedar Glades State Natural Area

== Demographics ==
Historical population
Census	Pop.	Note	%±
1840	14,555		—
1850	15,616		7.3%
1860	14,592		−6.6%
1870	16,207		11.1%
1880	19,259		18.8%
1890	18,906		−1.8%
1900	18,763		−0.8%
1910	16,872		−10.1%
1920	17,375		3.0%
1930	15,574		−10.4%
1940	16,030		2.9%
1950	17,768		10.8%
1960	16,859		−5.1%
1970	17,319		2.7%
1980	19,698		13.7%
1990	21,539		9.3%
2000	26,767		24.3%
2010	30,617		14.4%
2020	34,318		12.1%
2025 (est.)	38,071	▲	10.9%
U.S. Decennial Census; 1790–1960, 1900–1990, 1990–2000, 2010–2014

=== Racial and ethnic composition ===
Marshall County, Tennessee – Racial and ethnic composition Note: the US Census treats Hispanic/Latino as an ethnic category. This table excludes Latinos from the racial categories and assigns them to a separate category. Hispanics/Latinos may be of any race.
Race / ethnicity (NH = Non-Hispanic)	Pop 1980	Pop 1990	Pop 2000	Pop 2010	Pop 2020	% 1980	% 1990	% 2000	% 2010	% 2020
White alone (NH)	17,605	19,462	23,595	26,565	28,255	89.37%	90.36%	88.15%	86.77%	82.33%
Black or African American alone (NH)	1,926	1,906	2,076	1,985	2,018	9.78%	8.85%	7.76%	6.48%	5.88%
Native American or Alaska Native alone (NH)	13	24	62	100	103	0.07%	0.11%	0.23%	0.33%	0.30%
Asian alone (NH)	16	53	82	130	142	0.08%	0.25%	0.31%	0.42%	0.41%
Native Hawaiian or Pacific Islander alone (NH)	x	x	1	15	7	x	x	0.00%	0.05%	0.02%
Other race alone (NH)	5	2	12	28	93	0.03%	0.01%	0.04%	0.09%	0.27%
Mixed race or Multiracial (NH)	x	x	172	408	1,465	x	x	0.64%	1.33%	4.27%
Hispanic or Latino (any race)	133	92	767	1,386	2,235	0.68%	0.43%	2.87%	4.53%	6.51%
Total	19,698	21,539	26,767	30,617	34,318	100.00%	100.00%	100.00%	100.00%	100.00%

=== 2020 census ===
As of the 2020 census, there were 34,318 people, 13,279 households, and 8,624 families residing in the county.

The median age was 39.9 years. 23.4% of residents were under the age of 18 and 16.6% of residents were 65 years of age or older. For every 100 females there were 96.8 males, and for every 100 females age 18 and over there were 94.1 males age 18 and over.

The racial makeup of the county was 83.6% White, 6.0% Black or African American, 0.4% American Indian and Alaska Native, 0.4% Asian, <0.1% Native Hawaiian and Pacific Islander, 2.8% from some other race, and 6.8% from two or more races. Hispanic or Latino residents of any race comprised 6.5% of the population.

34.8% of residents lived in urban areas, while 65.2% lived in rural areas.

There were 13,279 households in the county, of which 32.7% had children under the age of 18 living in them. Of all households, 51.4% were married-couple households, 17.0% were households with a male householder and no spouse or partner present, and 24.6% were households with a female householder and no spouse or partner present. About 24.7% of all households were made up of individuals and 10.6% had someone living alone who was 65 years of age or older.

There were 14,302 housing units, of which 7.2% were vacant. Among occupied housing units, 72.7% were owner-occupied and 27.3% were renter-occupied. The homeowner vacancy rate was 1.4% and the rental vacancy rate was 5.4%.

=== 2000 census ===
As of the census of 2000, there were 26,767 people, 10,307 households, and 7,472 families residing in the county. The population density was 71 people per square mile (27 people/km^{2}). There were 11,181 housing units at an average density of 30 units per square mile (12/km^{2}). The racial makeup of the county was 89.42% White, 7.77% Black or African American, 0.25% Native American, 0.31% Asian, 0.01% Pacific Islander, 1.46% from other races, and 0.77% from two or more races. 2.87% of the population were Hispanic or Latino of any race.

There were 10,307 households, out of which 33.80% had children under the age of 18 living with them, 56.80% were married couples living together, 11.60% had a female householder with no husband present, and 27.50% were non-families. 23.90% of all households were made up of individuals, and 10.00% had someone living alone who was 65 years of age or older. The average household size was 2.56 and the average family size was 3.02.

In the county, the population was spread out, with 25.60% under the age of 18, 8.70% from 18 to 24, 29.90% from 25 to 44, 23.20% from 45 to 64, and 12.60% who were 65 years of age or older. The median age was 36 years. For every 100 females there were 95.40 males. For every 100 females age 18 and over, there were 92.90 males.

The median income for a household in the county was $38,457, and the median income for a family was $45,731. Males had a median income of $31,876 versus $22,362 for females. The per capita income for the county was $17,749. About 7.30% of families and 10.00% of the population were below the poverty line, including 10.80% of those under age 18 and 13.10% of those age 65 or over.

== Communities ==
- Unincorporated communities
  - Archer
  - Beasley
  - Belfast
  - Caney Spring
  - Cochran
  - Delina
  - Farmington
  - Graball
  - Holts Corner
  - Lunns Store
  - Milltown
  - Mooresville
  - Rich Creek
  - Robertson Fork
  - Silver Creek
  - South Berlin
  - Verona
  - Yell
- City
  - Lewisburg (county seat)
- Towns
  - Chapel Hill
  - Cornersville
  - Petersburg (partial)

== Politics ==
The county's political history is similar to the vast majority of Middle Tennessee. It was a solidly Democratic county for most of the 20th century, with the only breaks being national Republican landslides. However, it underwent a rapid swing to the Republican Party in the 21st century, with Al Gore in 2000 being the last Democratic presidential candidate to win there. Since 2004, the GOP share of the vote has increased, culminating with Donald Trump tallying margins rivaling those of Unionist counties in East Tennessee.

In the 1928 election, Herbert Hoover and Al Smith tied the county with a total of 735 votes apiece.

United States presidential election results for Marshall County, Tennessee
Year	Republican		Democratic		Third party(ies)	
Year	No.	%	No.	%	No.	%
1880	548	20.77%	2,006	76.04%	84	3.18%
1884	728	25.53%	2,084	73.07%	40	1.40%
1888	786	24.39%	2,291	71.08%	146	4.53%
1892	685	20.18%	2,185	64.36%	525	15.46%
1896	849	22.61%	2,835	75.50%	71	1.89%
1900	763	24.20%	2,184	69.27%	206	6.53%
1904	620	21.23%	2,152	73.67%	149	5.10%
1908	440	21.31%	1,544	74.77%	81	3.92%
1912	376	18.57%	1,551	76.59%	98	4.84%
1916	461	21.60%	1,652	77.41%	21	0.98%
1920	753	29.01%	1,828	70.42%	15	0.58%
1924	349	16.74%	1,696	81.34%	40	1.92%
1928	735	50.00%	735	50.00%	0	0.00%
1932	283	11.46%	2,167	87.73%	20	0.81%
1936	300	10.95%	2,431	88.76%	8	0.29%
1940	389	11.04%	3,132	88.90%	2	0.06%
1944	500	11.59%	3,812	88.34%	3	0.07%
1948	517	12.04%	3,059	71.22%	719	16.74%
1952	1,525	28.44%	3,837	71.56%	0	0.00%
1956	1,527	26.58%	4,100	71.37%	118	2.05%
1960	1,717	31.87%	3,625	67.29%	45	0.84%
1964	1,340	25.15%	3,989	74.85%	0	0.00%
1968	1,202	19.68%	1,527	25.00%	3,379	55.32%
1972	2,593	59.23%	1,526	34.86%	259	5.92%
1976	1,674	26.96%	4,457	71.78%	78	1.26%
1980	2,282	34.23%	4,277	64.16%	107	1.61%
1984	3,416	53.43%	2,935	45.91%	42	0.66%
1988	2,975	51.37%	2,795	48.26%	21	0.36%
1992	2,516	31.07%	4,491	55.46%	1,091	13.47%
1996	2,781	35.14%	4,447	56.20%	685	8.66%
2000	4,105	43.86%	5,107	54.57%	147	1.57%
2004	5,825	54.88%	4,722	44.48%	68	0.64%
2008	6,755	59.84%	4,320	38.27%	214	1.90%
2012	6,832	63.61%	3,725	34.68%	184	1.71%
2016	8,184	71.44%	2,852	24.90%	419	3.66%
2020	11,043	74.22%	3,605	24.23%	230	1.55%
2024	12,426	77.85%	3,390	21.24%	146	0.91%

== See also ==
- Marshall County Schools
- National Register of Historic Places listings in Marshall County, Tennessee
