= Cornersville, Tennessee =

- Town
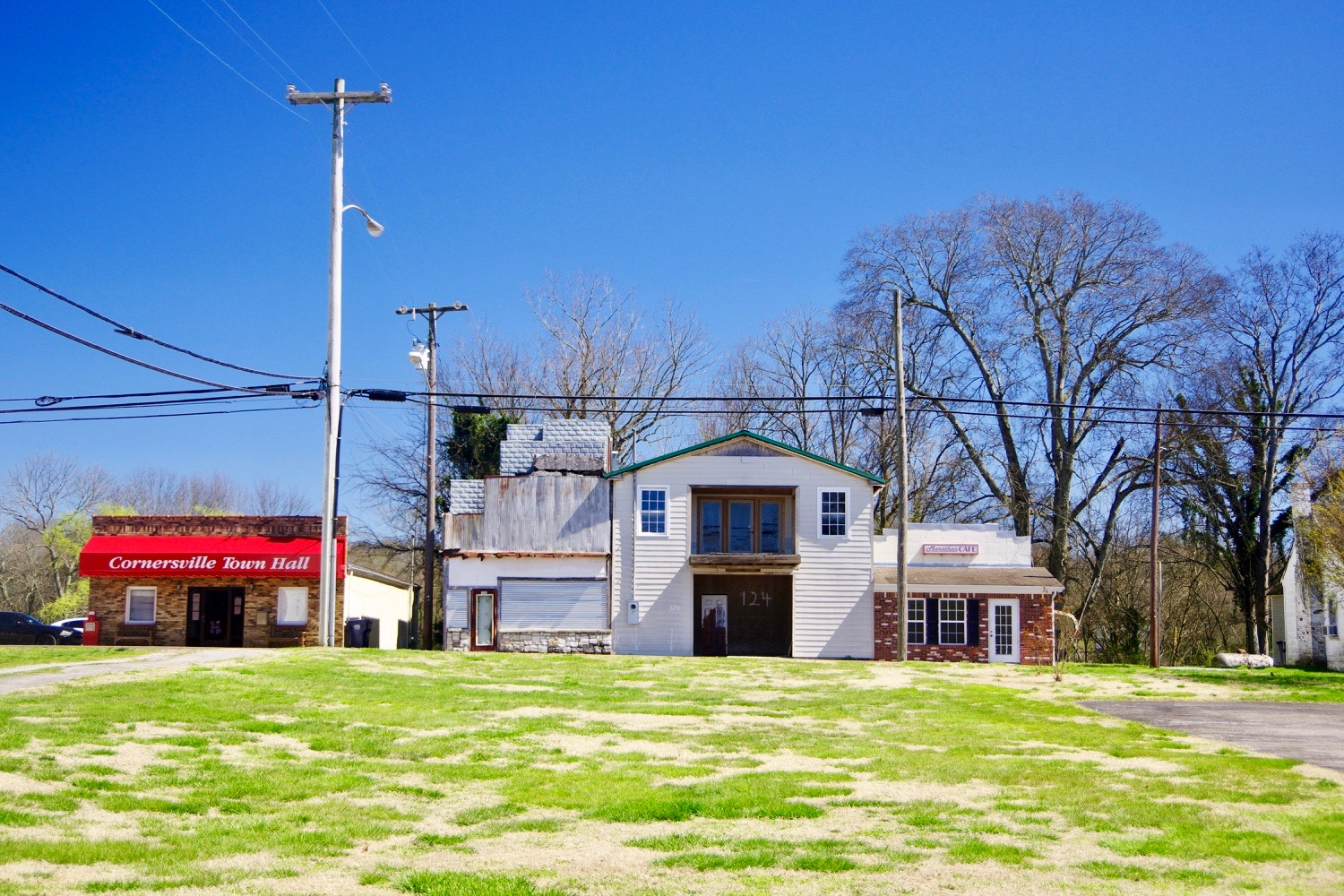
- Cornersville

- Location of Cornersville in Marshall County, Tennessee.
- Coordinates: 35°21′29″N 86°50′30″W
- Country: United States
- State: Tennessee
- County: Marshall

Area
  - Total: 5.55 sq mi (14.38 km^{2})
  - Land: 5.55 sq mi (14.38 km^{2})
  - Water: 0 sq mi (0.00 km^{2})
- Elevation: 883 ft (269 m)

Population (2020)
  - Total: 1,228
  - Density: 221/sq mi (85.4/km^{2})
- Time zone: UTC-6 (Central (CST))
  - Summer (DST): UTC-5 (CDT)
- ZIP code: 37047
- Area code: 931
- FIPS code: 47-17180
- GNIS feature ID: 1306120
- Website: www.cornersvilletn.org

Cornersville is a town in Marshall County, Tennessee, United States. The population was 1,228 at the 2020 census.

== History ==
Before becoming incorporated the town's name was Marathon. When it was first incorporated as a municipality on January 7, 1830, Cornersville was named for its location near the corner where Giles, Maury, Bedford and Lincoln counties came together. It was part of Giles County at the time of incorporation, but county boundaries have changed, and since 1870 it has been in Marshall County.

== Geography ==
Cornersville is located at 35°21′29″N 86°50′30″W (35.358152, -86.841681). The town is concentrated around the intersection of U.S. Route 31 and State Route 129 southwest of Lewisburg and northeast of Pulaski. Interstate 65 passes just to the west.

According to the United States Census Bureau, the town has a total area of 1.9 square miles (4.9 km^{2}), all of it land.

== Demographics ==
Historical population
Census	Pop.	Note	%±
1880	290		—
1910	290		—
1920	314		8.3%
1930	330		5.1%
1940	343		3.9%
1950	358		4.4%
1960	314		−12.3%
1970	655		108.6%
1980	722		10.2%
1990	683		−5.4%
2000	962		40.8%
2010	1,194		24.1%
2020	1,228		2.8%

=== 2020 census ===
Cornersville racial composition
Race	Number	Percentage
White (non-Hispanic)	1,107	90.15%
Black or African American (non-Hispanic)	31	2.52%
Asian	3	0.24%
Other/Mixed	59	4.8%
Hispanic or Latino	28	2.28%

As of the 2020 United States census, there were 1,228 people, 496 households, and 354 families residing in the town.

=== 2000 census ===
As of the census of 2000, there were 962 people, 371 households, and 251 families residing in the town. The population density was 511.8 inhabitants per square mile (197.6/km^{2}). There were 393 housing units at an average density of 209.1 units per square mile (80.7 units/km^{2}). The racial makeup of the town was 95.74% White, 3.64% African American, 0.10% Asian, 0.10% from other races, and 0.42% from two or more races. Hispanic or Latino of any race were 0.21% of the population.

There were 371 households, out of which 35.6% had children under the age of 18 living with them, 53.6% were married couples living together, 11.3% had a female householder with no husband present, and 32.3% were non-families. 28.8% of all households were made up of individuals, and 17.5% had someone living alone who was 65 years of age or older. The average household size was 2.55 and the average family size was 3.17.

In the town, the population was spread out, with 28.4% under the age of 18, 6.4% from 18 to 24, 28.6% from 25 to 44, 19.8% from 45 to 64, and 16.8% who were 65 years of age or older. The median age was 36 years. For every 100 females, there were 87.5 males. For every 100 females age 18 and over, there were 79.9 males.

The median income for a household in the town was $35,577, and the median income for a family was $45,313. Males had a median income of $32,000 versus $21,875 for females. The per capita income for the town was $15,810. About 7.2% of families and 13.5% of the population were below the poverty line, including 14.6% of those under age 18 and 18.8% of those age 65 or over.

== Media ==
=== Radio stations ===
- WZTN 89.9 FM
