= James Fount Tillman =

American politician (1853–1899)

8th Register of the Treasury
- In office July 1, 1893 – December 2, 1897
- President: Grover Cleveland; William McKinley
- Preceded by: William Rosecrans
- Succeeded by: Blanche Bruce

Personal details
- Born: 1853 Lewisburg, Tennessee
- Died: March 10, 1899 (aged 45) Palmetto, Tennessee

James Fount Tillman (1853 – March 10, 1899) was an American politician who was the eighth Register of the Treasury, serving during the second term of President Grover Cleveland. As Register of the Treasury, Tillman's signature appeared on U.S. currency issued between July 1, 1893, and December 2, 1897.

Tillman was born in 1853 in Lewisburg, Tennessee. His father, Alvis D. Tillman, died in 1855. Not having the resources for a college education, Tillman became a farmer. He married Alice Elizabeth Montgomery on July 3, 1876. The couple had four sons.

Prior to working for the U.S. Treasury, Tillman served in the Tennessee House of Representatives representing Marshall County, Tennessee. He served a partial term from December 1877 to January 1879 after William Norris Cowden resigned to become clerk of the Tennessee Supreme Court. Tillman was subsequently elected in 1882, serving again from January 1883 to January 1885. He was an unsuccessful candidate for Tennessee State Treasurer and Tennessee State Comptroller. Tillman also served as the Secretary of the National Farmers' Alliance.

Tillman became the Register of the Treasury after working for the 1892 electoral campaign of Grover Cleveland. After retiring from public service, Tillman entered private business and conducted dealings in New York City and Washington, D.C.

Tillman inherited Palmetto Farm in Marshall County from his father-in-law, Thomas Montgomery, after the Civil War. He died on March 10, 1899, at the age of 45 in Palmetto, Tennessee.
