= Palmetto Farm =

Historic house in Tennessee, United States

- U.S. National Register of Historic Places
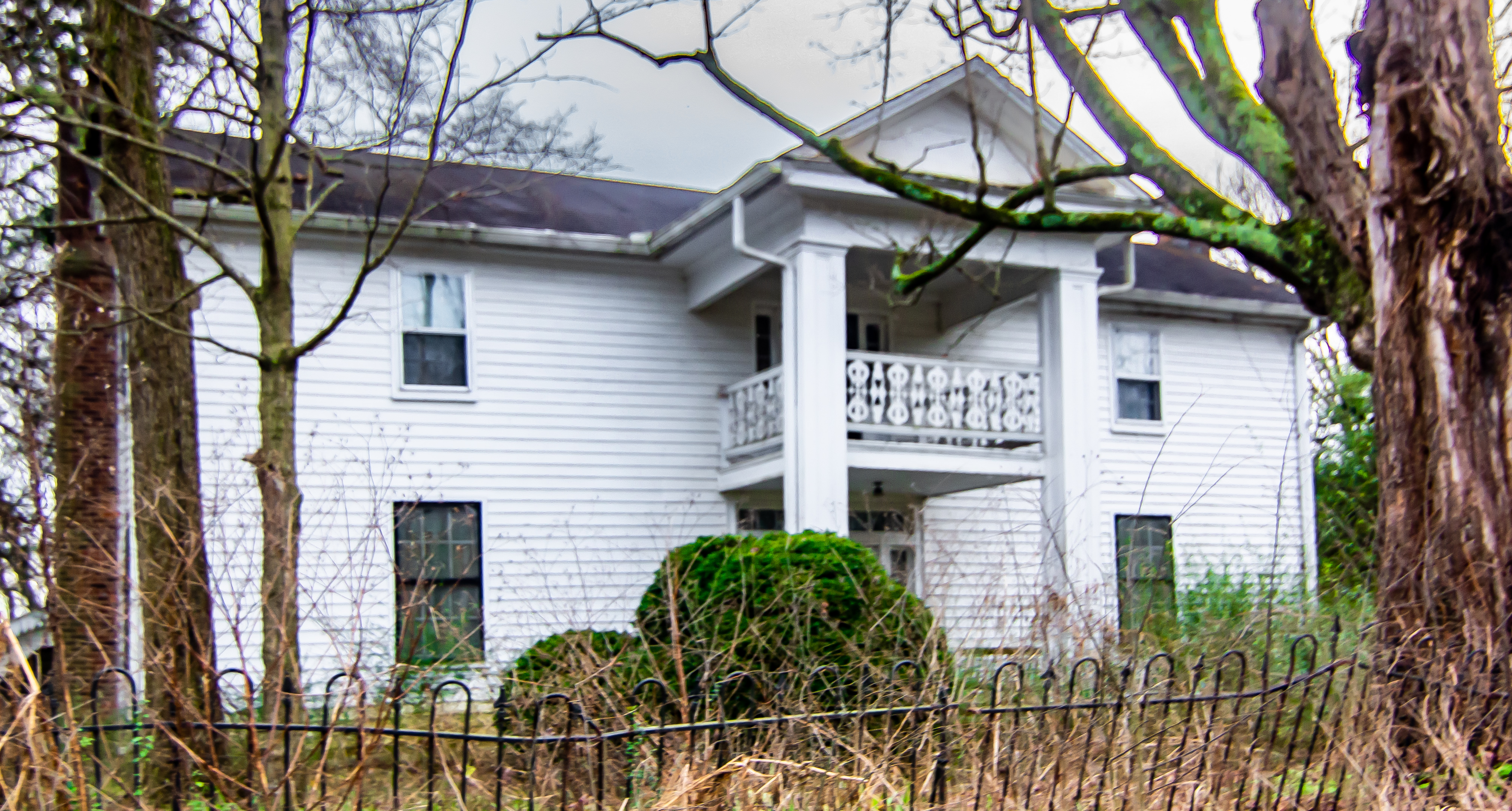

- Location within Tennessee Location within the United States
- Location: 2935 Shelbyville Hwy. Palmetto, Tennessee
- Coordinates: 35°29′28″N 86°39′49″W
- Area: 9 acres (3.6 ha)
- Built: 1847
- Built by: Montgomery, Thomas
- Architectural style: Greek Revival
- NRHP reference No.: 85000675
- Added to NRHP: March 28, 1985

The Palmetto Farm is a historic farmhouse in Palmetto, Tennessee, U.S.. It was built for Thomas Montgomery circa 1847, and it was designed in the Greek Revival architectural style. After Montgomery died in the American Civil War, the farm was inherited by his daughter Alice and her husband James Fount Tillman. Their son and his wife Sadie Wilson Tillman, a prominent Methodist, later inherited the house, which passed to Mrs. Roberta "Robert" Mason (a Montgomery descendant) and remained in the family until about 2010. It was listed on the National Register of Historic Places in 1985.
