= William Rosecrans =

American diplomat, politician and army officer (1819–1898)

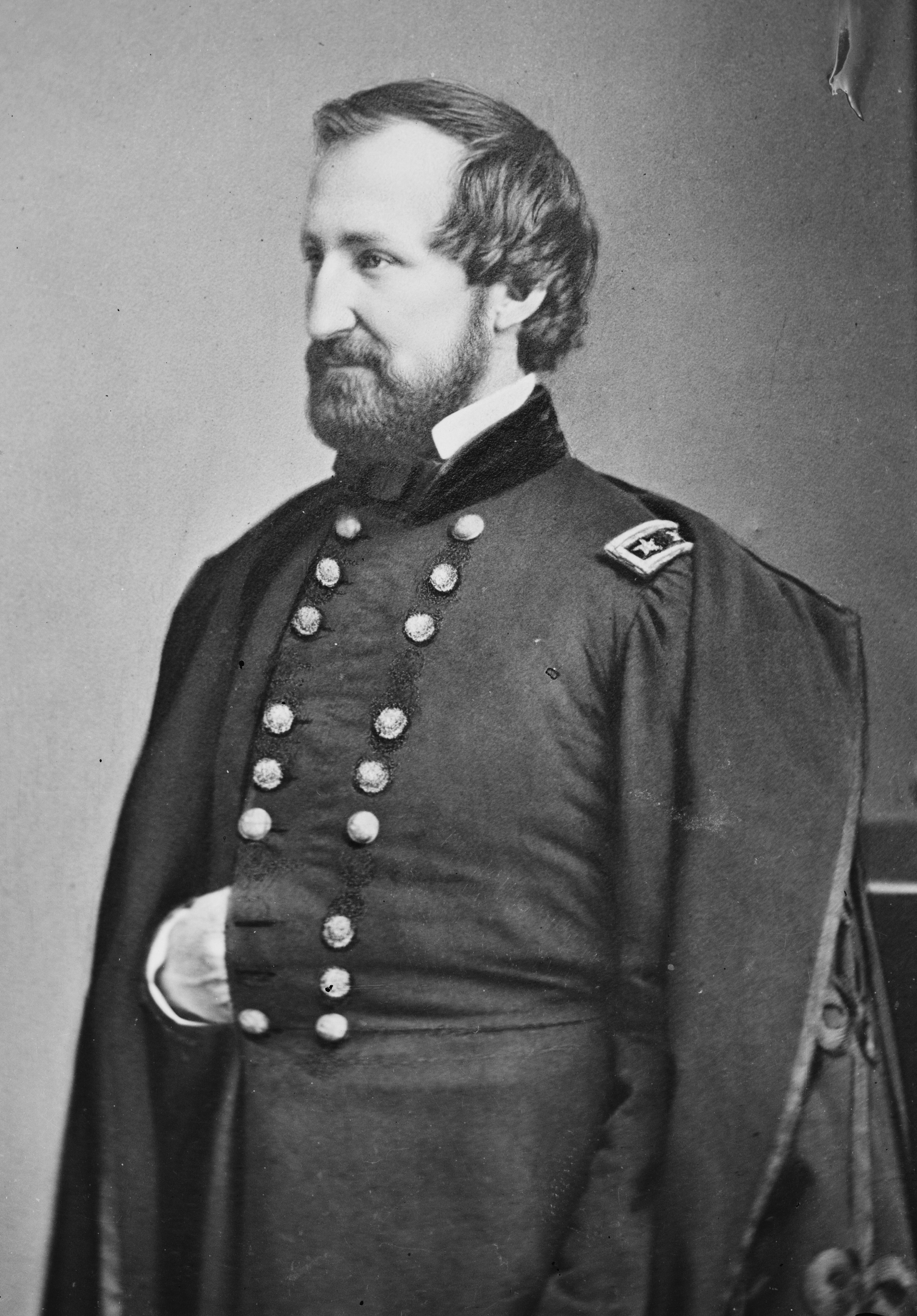
- Rosecrans, 1861–1865

7th Register of the Treasury
- In office June 8, 1885 – June 19, 1893
- President: Grover Cleveland; Benjamin Harrison
- Preceded by: Blanche Bruce
- Succeeded by: James Fount Tillman

Member of the U.S. House of Representatives from California's 1st district
- In office March 4, 1881 – March 3, 1885
- Preceded by: Horace Davis
- Succeeded by: Barclay Henley

United States Minister to Mexico
- In office December 10, 1868 – June 26, 1869
- President: Andrew Johnson; Ulysses S. Grant
- Preceded by: Marcus Otterbourg
- Succeeded by: Thomas H. Nelson

Personal details
- Born: William Starke Rosecrans; September 6, 1819 Delaware County, Ohio, US
- Died: March 11, 1898 (aged 78) Redondo Beach, California, US
- Resting place: Arlington National Cemetery
- Party: Democratic
- Education: United States Military Academy Class of 1842
- Nickname: "Old Rosy"

Military service
- Allegiance: United States
- Branch/service: United States Army
- Years of service: 1842–1854; 1861–1867
- Rank: Major General
- Commands: Army of the Mississippi; Army of the Cumberland; Department of the Missouri
- Battles/wars: American Civil War; Battle of Rich Mountain; Battle of Iuka; Battle of Carnifex Ferry; Second Battle of Corinth; Battle of Stones River; Tullahoma Campaign; Battle of Chickamauga; Price's Raid

William Starke Rosecrans (September 6, 1819 – March 11, 1898) was an American inventor, coal-oil company executive, diplomat, politician, and U.S. Army officer. He gained fame for his role as a Union general during the American Civil War. He was the victor at prominent battles in the Western theater of the American Civil War. However, his military career declined after his defeat at the Battle of Chickamauga in 1863.

Rosecrans graduated in 1842 from the United States Military Academy, where he served in engineering assignments and was a professor before leaving the Army to pursue a career in civil engineering. At the start of the Civil War, he led troops from Ohio and achieved early combat success in western Virginia. In 1862, in the Western theater, he won the Battle of Iuka and the Second Battle of Corinth while under the command of Maj. Gen. Ulysses S. Grant. His brusque manner and willingness to quarrel openly with superiors caused a professional rivalry with Grant (as well as with Secretary of War Edwin M. Stanton) that would adversely affect Rosecrans' career.

Given command of the Army of the Cumberland, he fought against Confederate general Braxton Bragg at Stones River. He then outmaneuvered him in the Tullahoma campaign, driving the Confederates from Middle Tennessee. His strategic movements then caused Bragg to abandon the critical city of Chattanooga, Tennessee, but Rosecrans' pursuit of Bragg ended during the bloody Battle of Chickamauga, where the wording of his order mistakenly opened a gap in the Union line and Rosecrans and a third of his army were swept from the field. Besieged in Chattanooga, Rosecrans was relieved of command by Grant.

Following his defeat, Rosecrans was reassigned to command the Department of Missouri, where he opposed Price's Raid. After the war, he served in diplomatic and appointed political positions and in 1880 was elected to Congress, representing California.

== Early life and education ==
William Starke Rosecrans was born on a farm near Little Taylor Run in Kingston Township, Delaware County, Ohio, the second of five sons of Crandall Rosecrans and Jemima Hopkins. (The first child, Chauncey, died in infancy.) Crandall was a veteran of the War of 1812, in which he served as adjutant to General William Henry Harrison, and then subsequently ran a tavern and store as well as a family farm. One of Crandall's heroes, General John Stark, was the inspiration for William's middle name. Rosecrans was descended from the Dutch-Scandinavian nobleman Harmon Henrik Rosenkrantz (1614–1674), who arrived in New Amsterdam in 1651, but the family name changed spelling during the American Revolutionary War. His mother was the widow of Timothy Hopkins, a relative of Stephen Hopkins, the Colonial Governor of Rhode Island and a signer of the Declaration of Independence.

William had little formal education in his early years, relying heavily on reading books. At the age of 13, he left home to work as a store clerk in Utica, and later Mansfield, Ohio. Unable to afford college, Rosecrans decided to try for an appointment to the United States Military Academy. He interviewed with Congressman Alexander Harper, who had been reserving his appointment for his son, but Harper was so impressed by Rosecrans that he nominated him instead.

Despite his lack of formal education, Rosecrans excelled academically at West Point, particularly in mathematics, French, drawing, and English grammar. At the academy, he received his nickname, "Rosy," or more often, "Old Rosy." He graduated from West Point in 1842, fifth in his class of 56 cadets, which included future generals such as James Longstreet, Abner Doubleday, Daniel Harvey Hill, and Earl Van Dorn. He was commissioned a brevet second lieutenant in the prestigious United States Army Corps of Engineers, reflecting his high academic achievement. At his graduation, he met Anna Elizabeth (or Eliza) Hegeman (1823–1883) of New York City and immediately fell in love. They were married on August 24, 1843. Their marriage lasted until her death on December 25, 1883. They had eight children.

== Career ==
After graduating from West Point, Rosecrans was assigned to duty at Fort Monroe, Virginia, engineering sea walls. After a year, he requested assignment as a professor at West Point, where he taught engineering and served as post commissary and quartermaster. Although West Point was a strong bastion of Episcopal Protestantism, during this assignment, he converted to Catholicism in 1845. He wrote about this decision to his family, who had raised him in the Methodist faith, which inspired the youngest of his brothers, Sylvester Horton Rosecrans, to convert as well. Sylvester would become the first bishop of the Roman Catholic Diocese of Columbus. Ultimately, both of Rosecrans's parents had deathbed conversions to Catholicism. According to University of Virginia historian William B. Kurtz, “unlike many men of his era content to leave religion to (that of) their wives, he played the central role in his family’s faith life."

Although most of the officers in his graduating class fought in the Mexican–American War, the War Department retained Rosecrans at West Point. From 1847 through 1853, he served on engineering assignments in Newport, Rhode Island, New Bedford, Massachusetts and (on temporary assignment to the United States Navy) at the Washington Navy Yard. During this period, Rosecrans sought several civilian jobs as an alternative way to support his growing family, now with four children. He applied for a professorship at the Virginia Military Institute in 1851, losing the position to fellow West Pointer Thomas J. Jackson.

While serving in Newport, Rhode Island, he volunteered his services as the engineer for the construction of St. Mary's Roman Catholic Church. The church is best known as the site of the wedding of John F. Kennedy and Jacqueline Bouvier in 1953 and was one of the largest churches constructed in the United States at that time. There is a memorial window in Rosecrans' honor in the church.

Rosecrans suffered a period of failing health and resigned from the Army in 1854, moving into civilian fields. He took over a mining business in Western Virginia (today West Virginia) and ran it extremely successfully. He designed and installed one of the first complete lock and dam systems in Western Virginia on the Coal River; today recognized as the Coal River Locks, Dams, and Log Booms Archeological District. In Cincinnati, he and two partners built one of the first oil refineries west of the Allegheny Mountains. He obtained patents for many inventions, including the first kerosene lamp to successfully burn a round wick and a more effective method of manufacturing soap. On December 4, 1865, the San Francisco Directory for the year 1867 records Rosecrans arriving from Panama in a steamship among many passengers. While Rosecrans was president of the Preston Coal Oil Company, in 1859, he was burned severely when an experimental "safety" oil lamp exploded, setting the refinery on fire. It took him 18 months to recover, and the resulting facial scars, most of which would later be covered by his beard, gave him the appearance of having a perpetual smirk. He had recovered from his injuries and was working to get the company in order when the Civil War began.

=== American Civil War ===
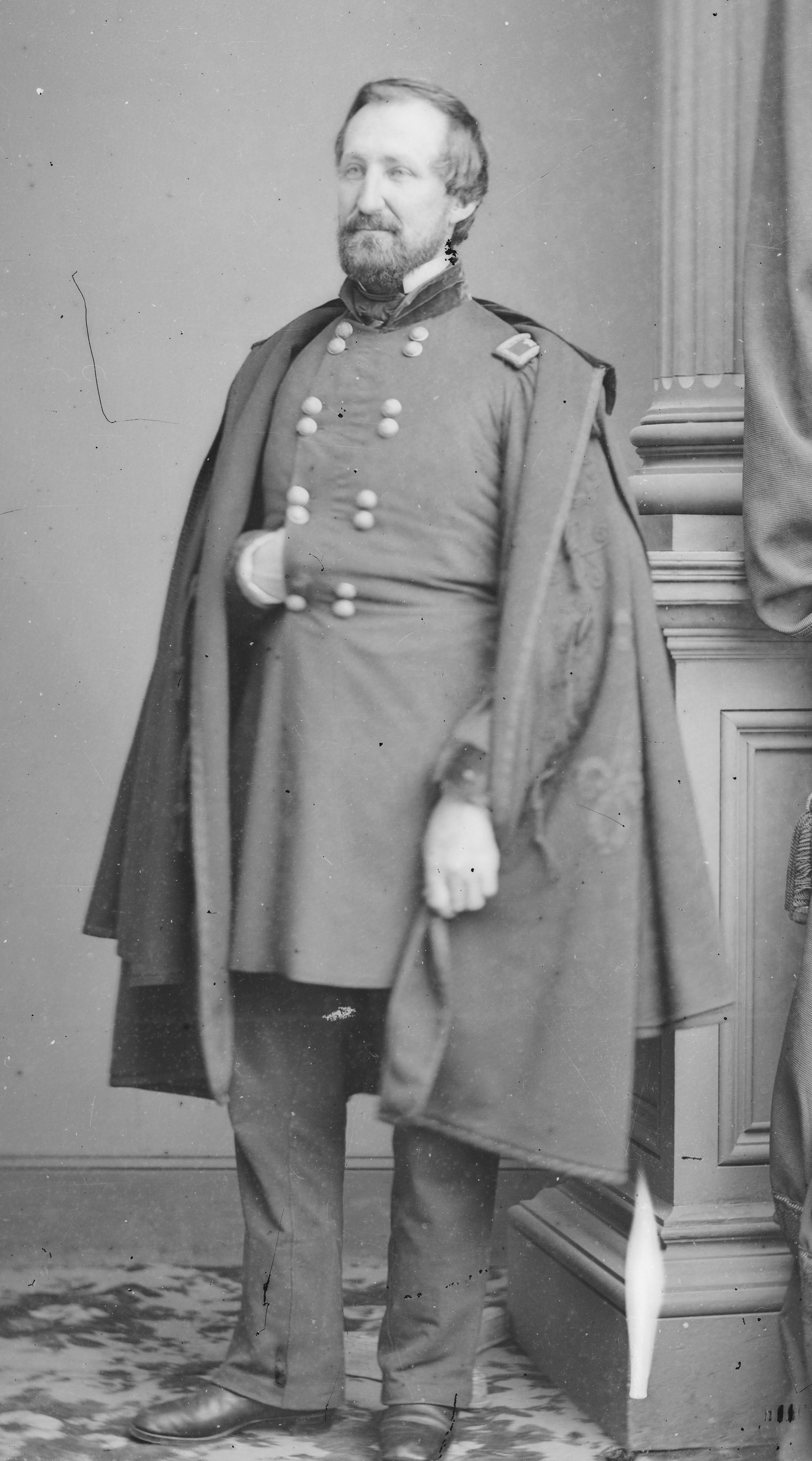
Portrait by Brady, 1861

Just days after Fort Sumter surrendered, Rosecrans offered his services to Ohio Governor William Dennison Jr., who assigned him as a volunteer aide-de-camp to Maj. Gen. George B. McClellan, who commanded all Ohio volunteer forces at the beginning of the war. Promoted to the rank of colonel, Rosecrans briefly commanded the 23rd Ohio Infantry Regiment, whose members included Rutherford B. Hayes and William McKinley, both future presidents. He was promoted to brigadier general in the Regular Army, ranking from May 16, 1861.

[Robert E. Lee's Western Virginia campaign], after its plain failure, was virtually abandoned by the Government. Rosecrans was esteemed in the South as one of the best generals the North had in the field. He was declared by military critics, who could not be accused of partiality, to have clearly outgeneraled Lee, who made the entire object of his campaign to "surround the Dutch General."

— Edward A. Pollard, Southern History of the War (1865)

His plans and decisions proved extremely effective in the Western Virginia Campaign. His victories at Rich Mountain and Corrick's Ford in July 1861 were among the first Union victories of the war, but his superior, Maj. Gen. McClellan, received the credit. Rosecrans then prevented by "much maneuvering but little fighting" Confederate Brig. Gen. John B. Floyd and his superior, Gen. Robert E. Lee, from recapturing the area that became the state of West Virginia. When McClellan was summoned to Washington after the defeat suffered by Federal forces at the First Battle of Bull Run, General-in-Chief Winfield Scott suggested that McClellan turn over the West Virginia command to Rosecrans. McClellan agreed, and Rosecrans assumed command of the future Department of Western Virginia.

Rosecrans the Brave sheet music cover

In late 1861, Rosecrans planned for a winter campaign to capture the strategic town of Winchester, Virginia, turning the Confederate flank at Manassas, Virginia. He traveled to Washington to obtain McClellan's approval. McClellan disapproved, however, telling Rosecrans that putting 20,000 Union men into Winchester would be countered by Confederates moving an equal number into the vicinity. He also transferred 20,000 of Rosecrans's 22,000 men to serve under Brig. Gen. Frederick W. Lander, leaving Rosecrans with insufficient resources to do any campaigning. In March 1862, Rosecrans's department was converted to the Mountain Department and given to political general John C. Frémont, leaving Rosecrans without a command. He served briefly in Washington, where his opinions clashed with those of newly appointed Secretary of War Edwin M. Stanton on tactics and Union command organization for the Shenandoah Valley campaign against Stonewall Jackson. Stanton became one of Rosecrans's most vocal critics. One of Stanton's assignments for Rosecrans was to act as a guide for Brig. Gen. Louis Blenker's division (Frémont's department) in the valley, and Rosecrans became intimately involved in the political and command confusion in the campaign against Jackson in the Valley.

==== Western Theater ====
Rosecrans was transferred in May 1862 to the Western theater and received the command of two divisions (the Right Wing) of Maj. Gen. John Pope's Army of the Mississippi. He took an active part in the siege of Corinth under Maj. Gen. Henry W. Halleck. He received command of the entire army on June 26, and in July, added the responsibility of commanding the District of Corinth. In these roles, he was the subordinate of Maj. Gen. Ulysses S. Grant, who commanded the District of Western Tennessee and the Army of the Tennessee, from whom he received direction in the Iuka-Corinth campaign in September and October 1862.

==== Iuka ====
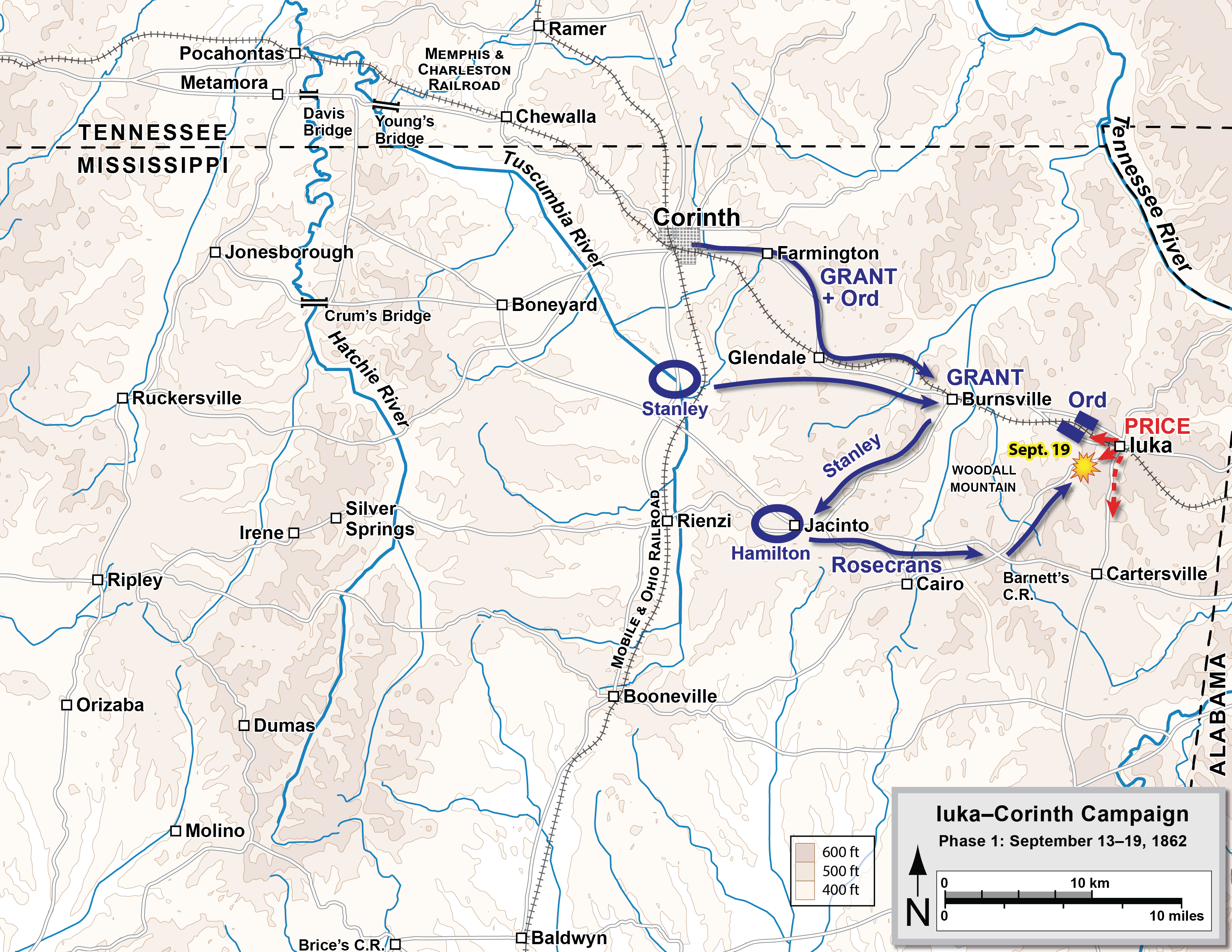
Opening of Iuka-Corinth Campaign

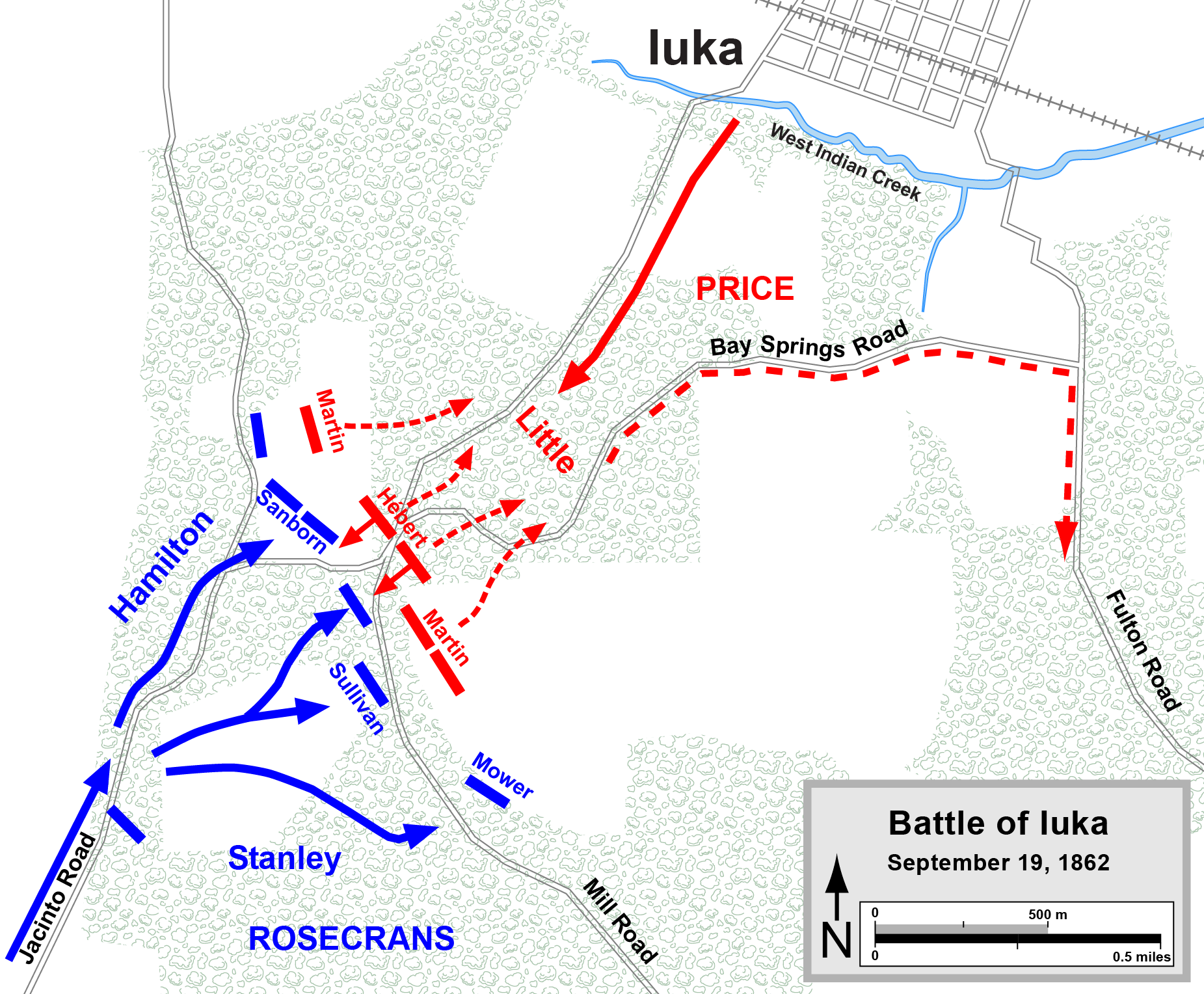
Battle of Iuka

Confederate Maj. Gen. Sterling Price had been ordered by Gen. Braxton Bragg to move his army from Tupelo toward Nashville, Tennessee, in conjunction with Bragg's Kentucky offensive. Price's army settled in Iuka and awaited the arrival of Maj. Gen. Earl Van Dorn's Army of West Tennessee. The two generals intended to unite and attack Grant's lines of communication in western Tennessee, which would prevent Buell's reinforcement if Grant reacted the way they expected, or might allow them to follow Bragg and support his Northern invasion if Grant acted more passively.

Grant did not wait to be attacked, approving a plan proposed by Rosecrans to converge on Price with two columns before Van Dorn could reinforce him. Grant sent Brig. Gen. Edward Ord with three Army of the Tennessee divisions (about 8,000 men) along the Memphis and Charleston Railroad to move upon Iuka from the northwest. Rosecrans's army would march in concert along the Mobile and Ohio Railroad, swinging into Iuka from the southwest, closing the escape route for Price's army. Grant moved with Ord's headquarters and had little tactical control over Rosecrans during the battle.

While Ord advanced toward Iuka on the night of September 18, Rosecrans was late, having farther to march over roads mired in mud; furthermore, one of his divisions took a wrong turn and had to countermarch to the correct road. That night, he notified Grant that he was 20 miles (32 km) away, but planned to start marching again at 4:30 a.m. and should reach Iuka by midafternoon on September 19. Considering this delay, Grant ordered Ord to move within 4 miles (6.4 km) of the town, but to await the sound of fighting between Rosecrans and Price before engaging the Confederates. Rosecrans' army marched early on September 19, but instead of using two roads as originally planned, it took only one of them. Rosecrans was concerned that if he used both roads, the two halves of his divided force could not support each other if the Confederates attacked.

I cannot speak too highly of the energy and skill displayed by General Rosecrans in the attack, and of the endurance of the troops under him. General Ord's command showed untiring zeal, but the direction taken by the enemy prevented them from taking the active part they desired.

— Grant's first report of the battle, September 20, 1862.

If it was the object of the enemy to make their way into Kentucky, they were defeated in that; if to hold their position until Van Dorn could come up on the southwest of Corinth and make a simultaneous attack, they were defeated in that. Our only defeat was in not capturing the enemy army or destroying it as I had hoped to do. It was a part of General Hamilton's command that did the fighting, directed entirely by that cool and deserving officer.

— Grant's second report of the battle, October 22, 1862.

Rosecrans was within 2 miles (3.2 km) of the town on September 19, pushing back Confederate pickets, when his lead element was struck suddenly by a Confederate division. Fighting, which Price later stated he had "never seen surpassed," continued from 4:30 p.m. until after dark. A fresh north wind, blowing from Ord's position in the direction of Iuka, caused an acoustic shadow that prevented the sound of the guns from reaching him, and he and Grant knew nothing of the engagement until after it was over. Ord's troops stood idly while the fighting raged only a few miles away.

During the night, both Rosecrans and Ord deployed their forces in the expectation of a renewal of the engagement at daylight, but the Confederate forces had withdrawn. Price had been planning this move since September 18, and Rosecrans's attack merely delayed his departure. The Confederates used the road that the Union army had not blocked, meeting up with Van Dorn's army five days later. Rosecrans's cavalry and some infantry pursued Price for 15 miles (24 km), but owing to the exhausted condition of his troops, his column was outrun and he gave up the pursuit. Grant had partially accomplished his objective—Price was not able to link up with Bragg in Kentucky, but Rosecrans had not been able to destroy the Confederate army or prevent it from linking up with Van Dorn and threatening the critical railroad junction at Corinth.

The Battle of Iuka marked the beginning of a long professional enmity between Rosecrans and Grant. The Northern press gave accounts very favorable to Rosecrans at Grant's expense. Some rumors circulated that the reason Ord's column had not attacked in conjunction with Rosecrans was not that the battle had been inaudible, but that Grant had been drunk and incompetent. Grant's first report of the battle was highly complimentary to Rosecrans, but his second, written after Rosecrans had published his own report, took a markedly negative turn. His third statement was in his Personal Memoirs, where he wrote "I was disappointed at the result of the battle of Iuka—but I had so high an opinion of General Rosecrans that I found no fault at the time."

==== Corinth ====
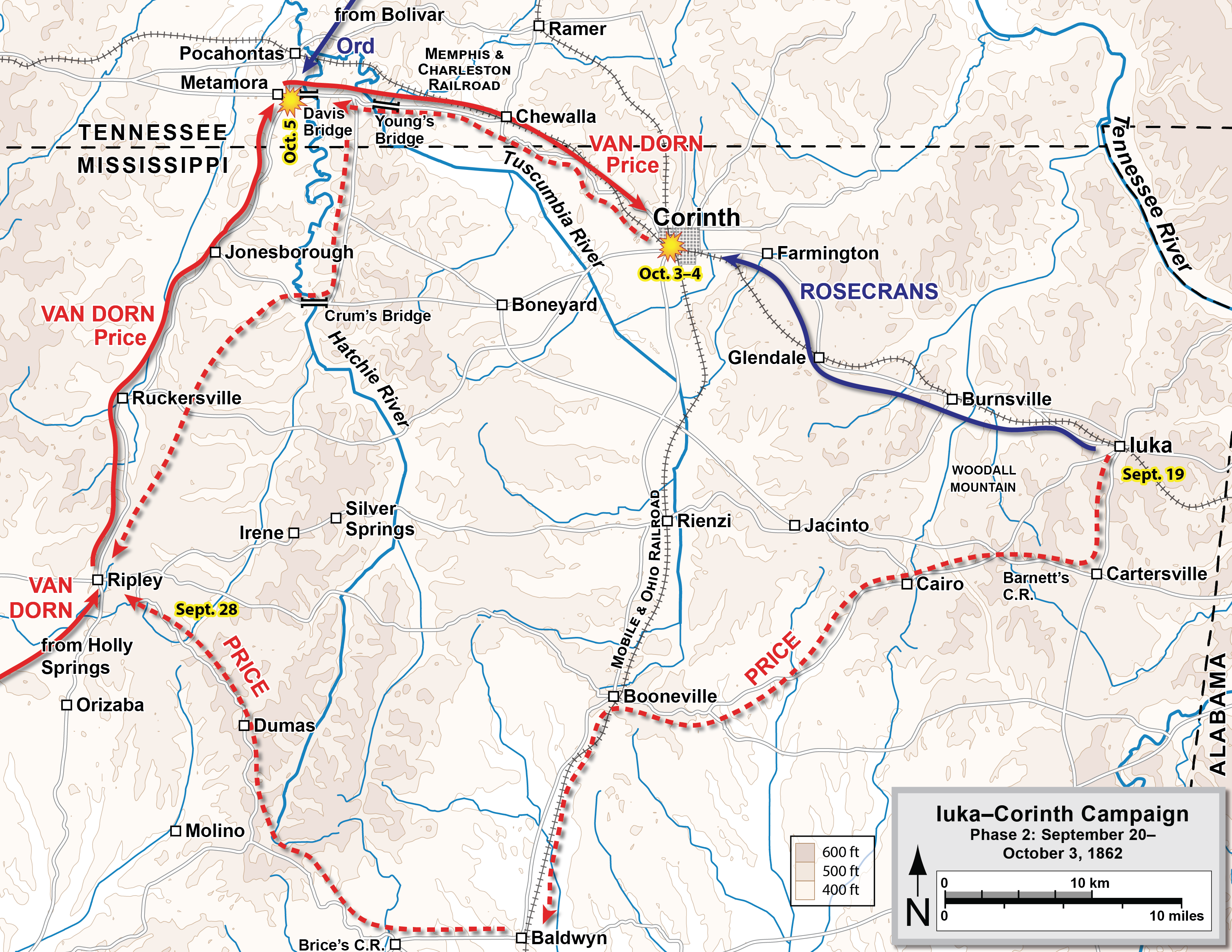
Second phase of the Iuka-Corinth Campaign

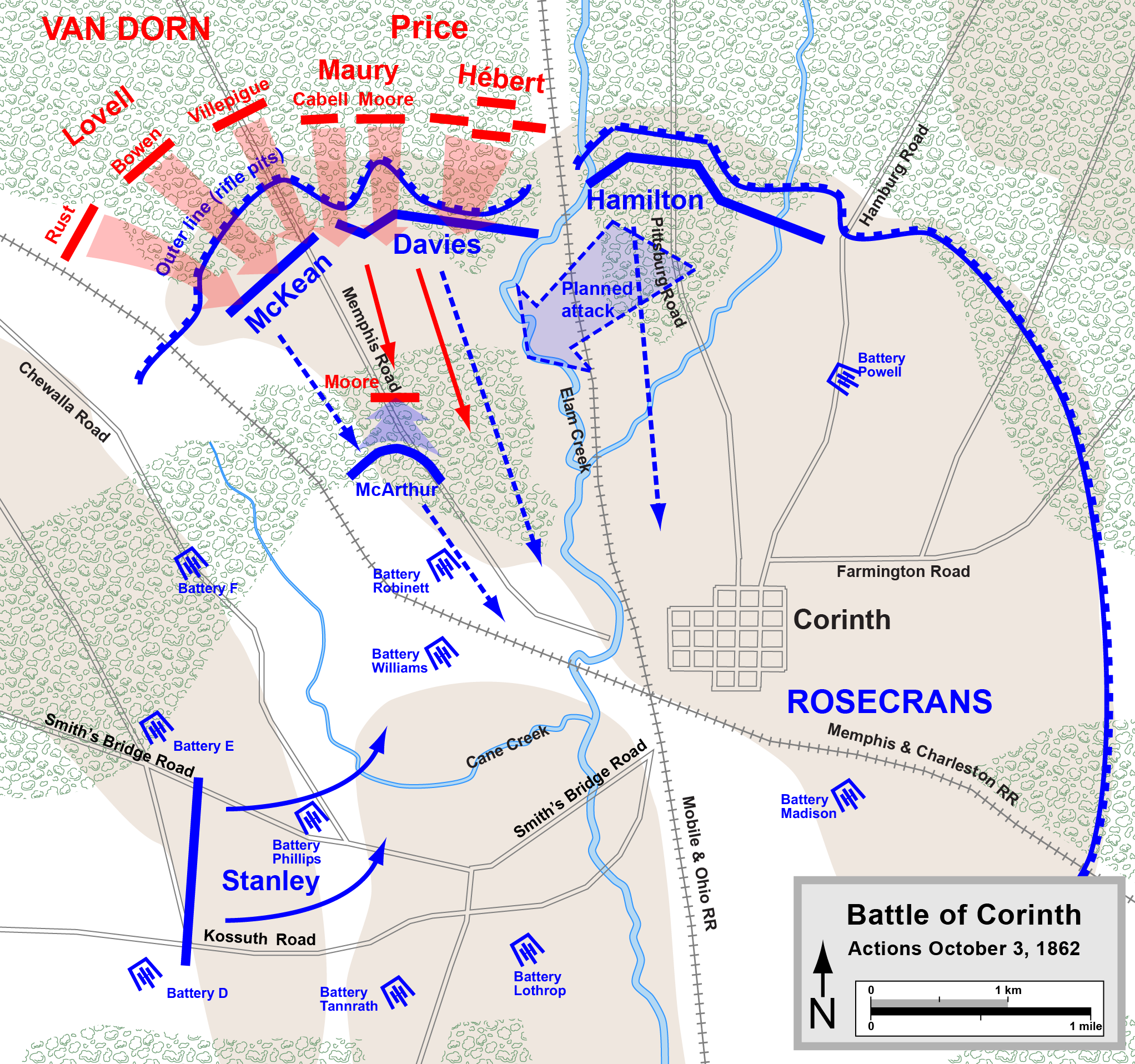
Battle of Corinth, October 3, 1862

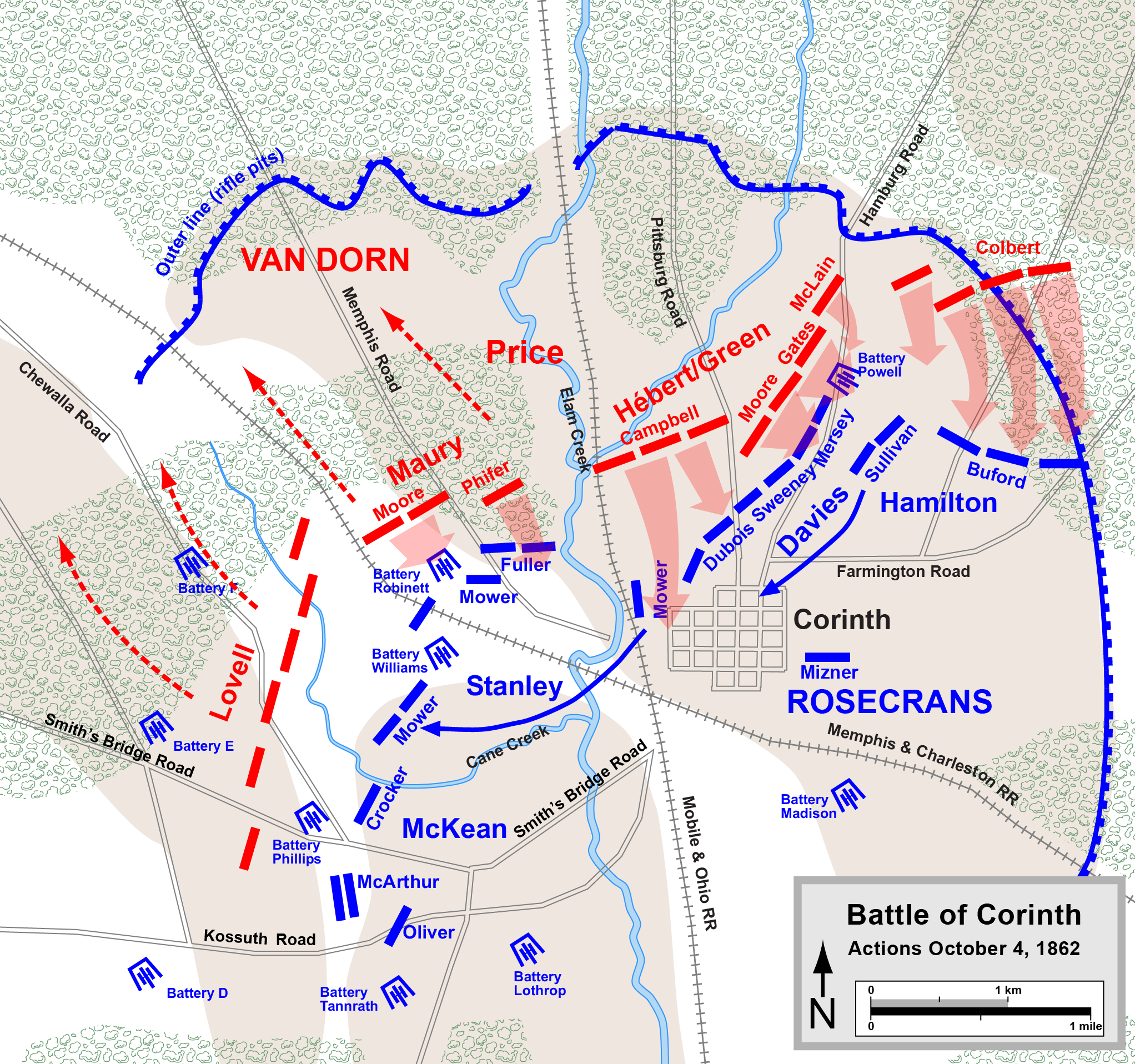
Battle of Corinth, October 4, 1862

Price's army joined Van Dorn's on September 28. Van Dorn, as the senior officer, took command of the combined force. Grant became certain that Corinth was their next target. The Confederates hoped to seize Corinth from an unexpected direction, isolating Rosecrans from reinforcements, and then sweep into Middle Tennessee. Grant sent word to Rosecrans to be prepared for an attack, but despite the warning, Rosecrans was not convinced that Corinth was necessarily the target of Van Dorn's advance. He believed that the Confederate commander would not be foolhardy enough to attack the fortified town and might well instead choose to strike the Mobile and Ohio Railroad and maneuver the Federals out of their position.

On the morning of October 3, three of Rosecrans's divisions advanced into old Confederate rifle pits north and northwest of town. Van Dorn began his assault at 10 a.m. as a planned double envelopment, in which he would open the fight on Rosecrans's left, in the hope that Rosecrans would weaken his right to reinforce his left, at which time Price would make the main assault against the Federal right and enter the works. The Confederates forced their way through a temporary gap in the line about 1:30 p.m., and the whole Union line fell back to within half a mile of the redoubts.

So far the advantage had been with the Confederates. Rosecrans had been driven back at all points, and night found his entire army, except pickets, inside the redoubts. Both sides had been exhausted by the fighting. The weather had been hot, with a high of 94 °F (34 °C), and water was scarce, causing many men to nearly faint from their exertions. Rosecrans's biographer, William M. Lamers, reported that Rosecrans was confident at the end of the first day of battle, saying, "We've got them where we want them", and that some of the general's associates claimed that he was in "magnificent humor." Peter Cozzens, however, suggested that Rosecrans was "tired and bewildered, certain only he was badly outnumbered—at least three to one by his reckoning." Civil War historian Steven E. Woodworth portrayed Rosecrans's conduct in a negative light:

Rosecrans ... had not done well. He had failed to anticipate the enemy's action, put little more than half his troops into the battle, and called on his men to fight on ground they could not possibly hold. He had sent a series of confusing and unrealistic orders to his division commanders and had done nothing to coordinate their activities, while he personally remained safely back in Corinth. The movements of the army that day had had nothing to do with any plan of his to develop the enemy or make a fighting withdrawal. The troops and their officers had simply held on as best as they could.

On the second day of battle, the Confederates moved forward at 9 a.m. to meet heavy Union artillery fire, storming Battery Powell and Battery Robinett, where desperate hand-to-hand fighting occurred. A brief incursion into the town of Corinth was repulsed. After a Federal counterattack recaptured Battery Powell, Van Dorn ordered a general retreat. At 4 p.m., reinforcements from Grant under the command of Brig. Gen. James B. McPherson arrived from Jackson. But the Battle of Corinth had effectively been over since 1 p.m. and the Confederates were in full retreat.

It lives in the memory of every soldier who fought that day how his General plunged into the thickest of the conflict, fought like a private soldier, dealt sturdy blows with the flat of his sword on the runaways, and fairly drove them to stand. Then came a quick rally which his magnificent bearing inspired, a storm of grape from the batteries tore its way through the Rebel ranks, reinforcements which Rosecrans sent flying gave impetus to the National advance, and the charging column was speedily swept back outside the entrenchments.

— Whitelaw Reid, Ohio in the War

Once again, Rosecrans's performance during the second day of the battle has been the subject of dispute among historians. His biographer, Lamers, paints a romantic picture:

One of Davies' men, David Henderson, watched Rosecrans as he dashed in front of the Union lines. Bullets carried his hat away. His hair flew in the wind. As he rode along he shouted: "Soldiers! Stand by your country." "He was the only general I ever knew," Henderson said later, "who was closer to the enemy than we were who fought at the front." Henderson (after the war, a Congressman from Ohio and Speaker of the House of Representatives) wrote that Rosecrans was the "Central leading and victorious spirit. ... By his splendid example in the thickest of the fight he succeeded in restoring the line before it was completely demoralized; and the men, brave when bravely led, fought again."

Peter Cozzens, author of a recent book-length study of Iuka and Corinth, came to the opposite conclusion:

Rosecrans was in the thick of battle, but his presence was hardly inspiring. The Ohioan had lost all control of his infamous temper, and he cursed as cowards everyone who pushed past him until he, too lost hope. ... Rosecrans's histrionics nearly cost him his life. "On the second day I was everywhere on the line of battle," he wrote with disingenuous pride. "Temple Clark of my staff was shot through the breast. My saber-tache strap was caught by a bullet, and my gloves were stained with the blood of a staff officer wounded at my side. An alarm spread that I was killed, but it was soon stopped by my appearance on the field."

Rosecrans's performance immediately after the battle was lackluster. Grant had given him specific orders to pursue Van Dorn without delay, but he did not begin his march until the morning of October 5, explaining that his troops needed rest and the thicketed country made progress difficult by day and impossible by night. At 1 p.m. on October 4, when pursuit would have been most effective, Rosecrans rode along his line to deny in person a rumor that he had been slain. At Battery Robinett, he dismounted, bared his head, and told his soldiers, "I stand in the presence of brave men, and I take my hat off to you."

==== Army of the Cumberland ====
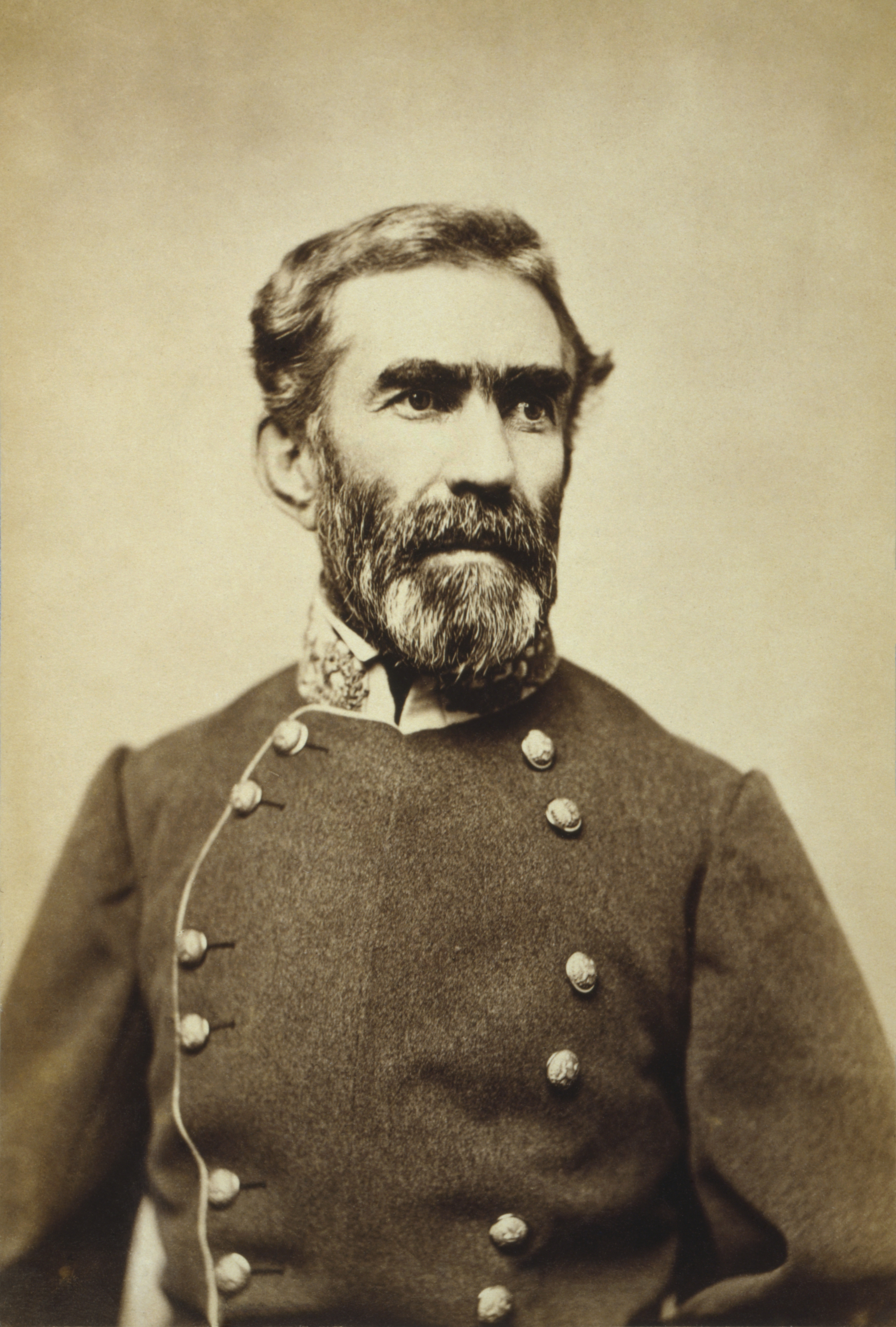
Rosecrans's principal opponent, Gen. Braxton Bragg

Rosecrans once again found that he was a hero in the Northern press. On October 24, he was given command of XIV Corps (which, because he was also given command of the Department of the Cumberland, would soon be renamed the Army of the Cumberland), replacing the ineffectual Maj. Gen. Don Carlos Buell, who had just fought the inconclusive Battle of Perryville, Kentucky, against Gen. Braxton Bragg, but was accused of moving too cautiously. Rosecrans was promoted to the rank of major general (of volunteers, as opposed to his brigadier rank in the regular army). The promotion was applied retroactive to March 21, 1862, so that he would outrank fellow Maj. Gen. Thomas; Thomas had earlier been offered Buell's command, but turned down the opportunity out of a sense of personal loyalty. Grant was not unhappy that Rosecrans was leaving his command.

In his role as an army commander, Rosecrans became one of the most popular generals in the Union Army. He was known to his men as "Old Rosy", not only because of his last name (the source for that nickname at West Point), but because of his large red nose, which was described as "intensified Roman". As a devout Catholic, he carried a crucifix on his watch chain and a rosary in his pocket, and he delighted in keeping his staff up half the night debating religious doctrine. He could swing swiftly from bristling anger to good-natured amusement, which endeared him to his men.

==== Stones River ====
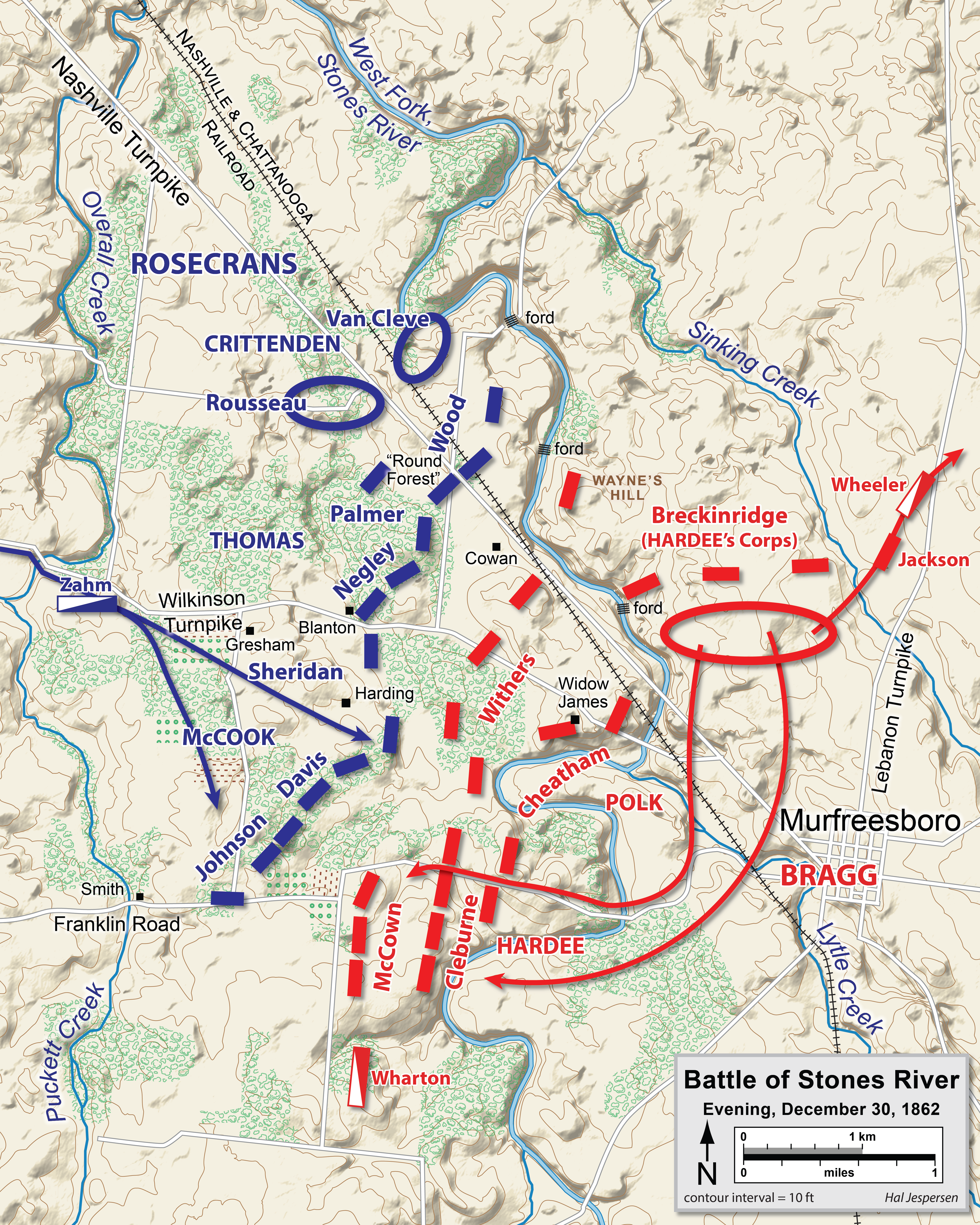
Movements and positions the night of December 30 to December 31.

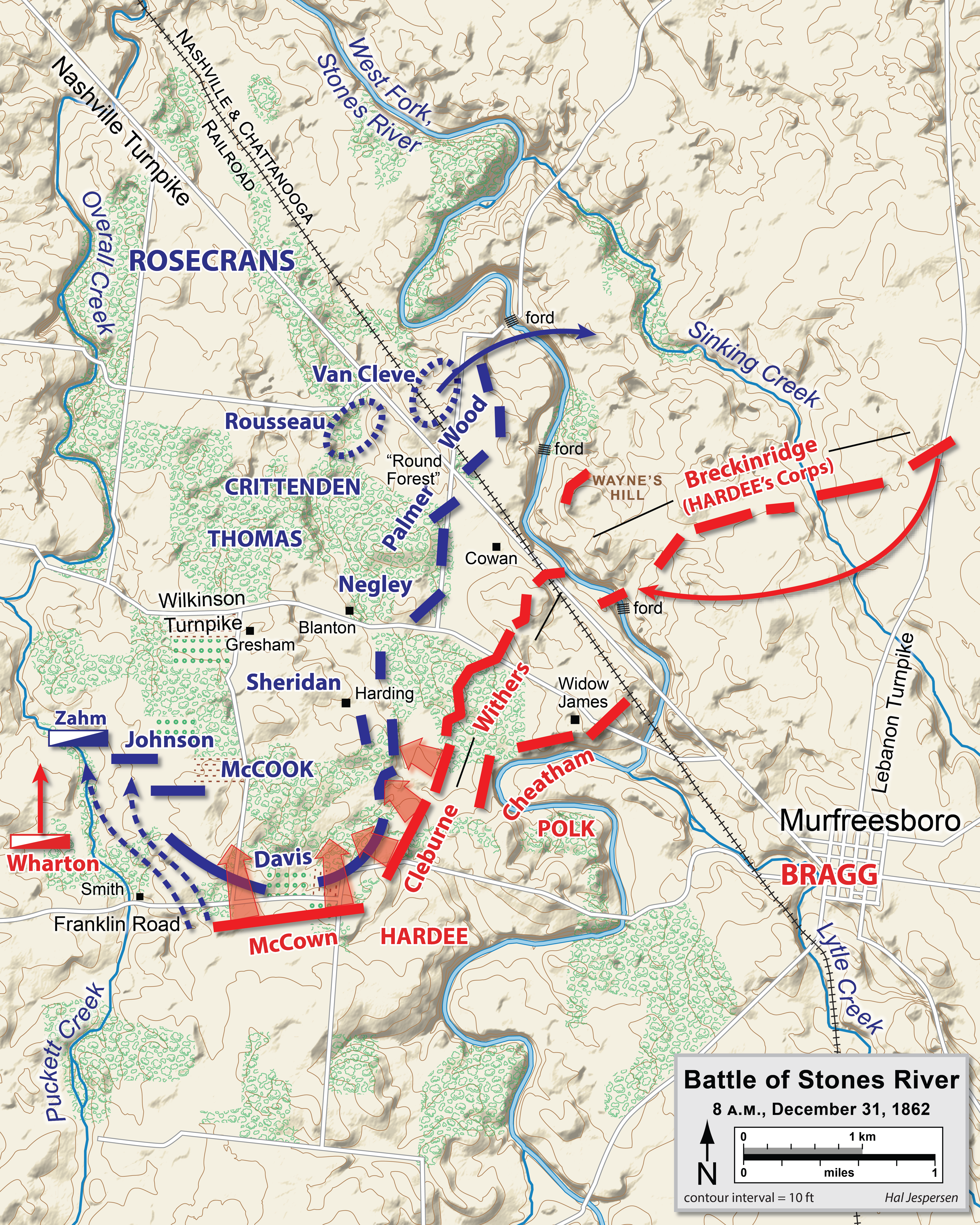
December 31, 8:00 a.m.

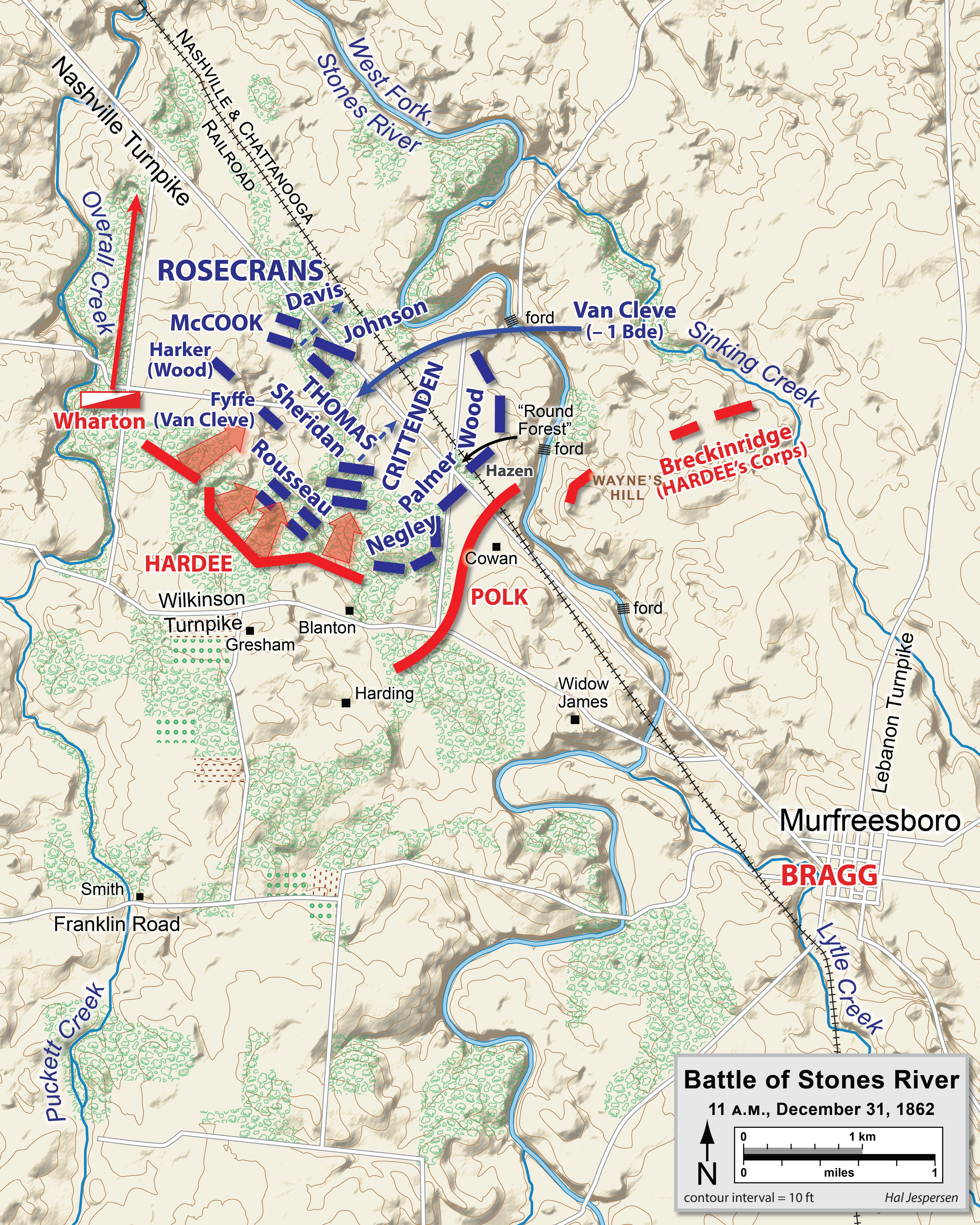
December 31, 11:00 a.m.

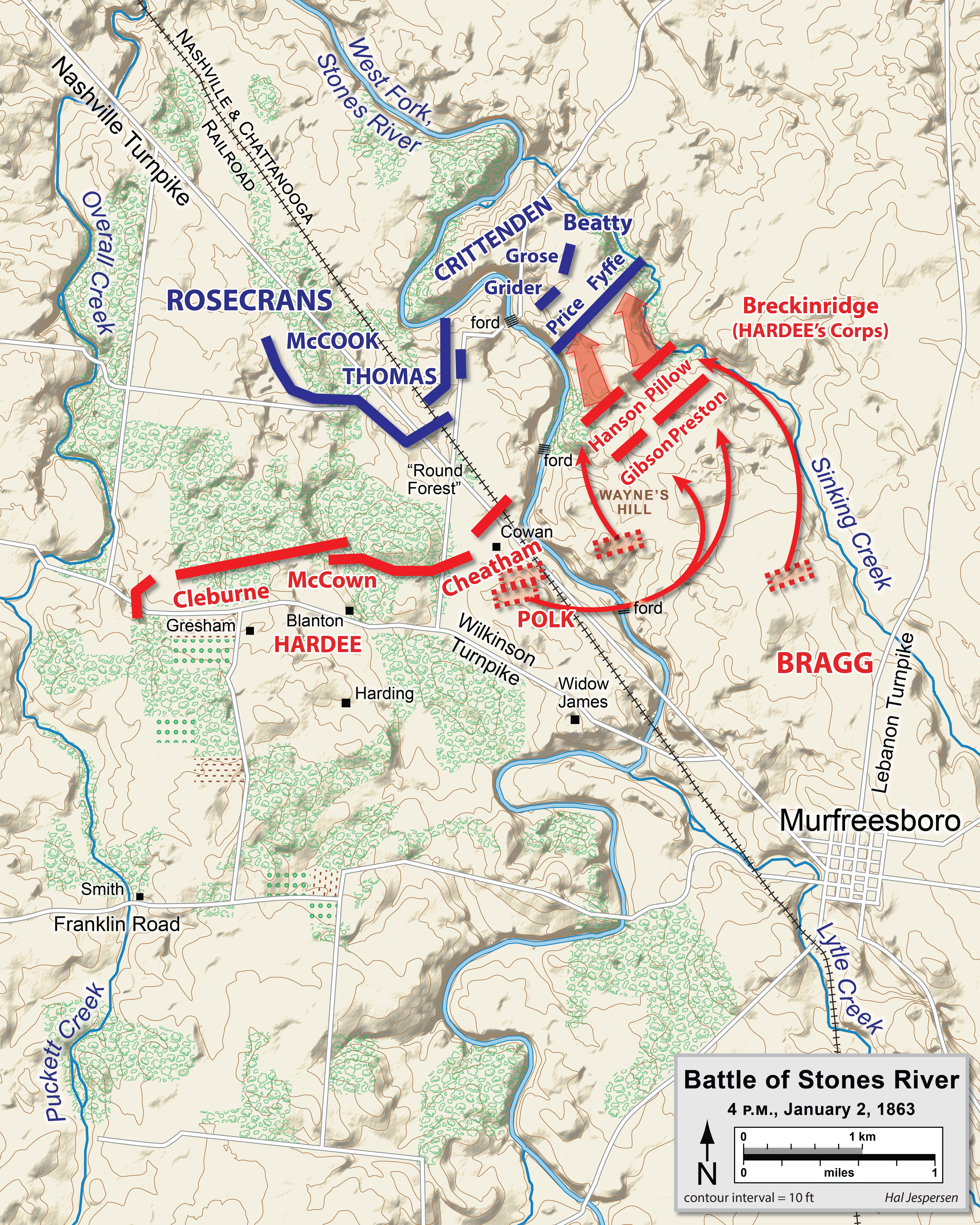
January 2, 4:00 p.m.

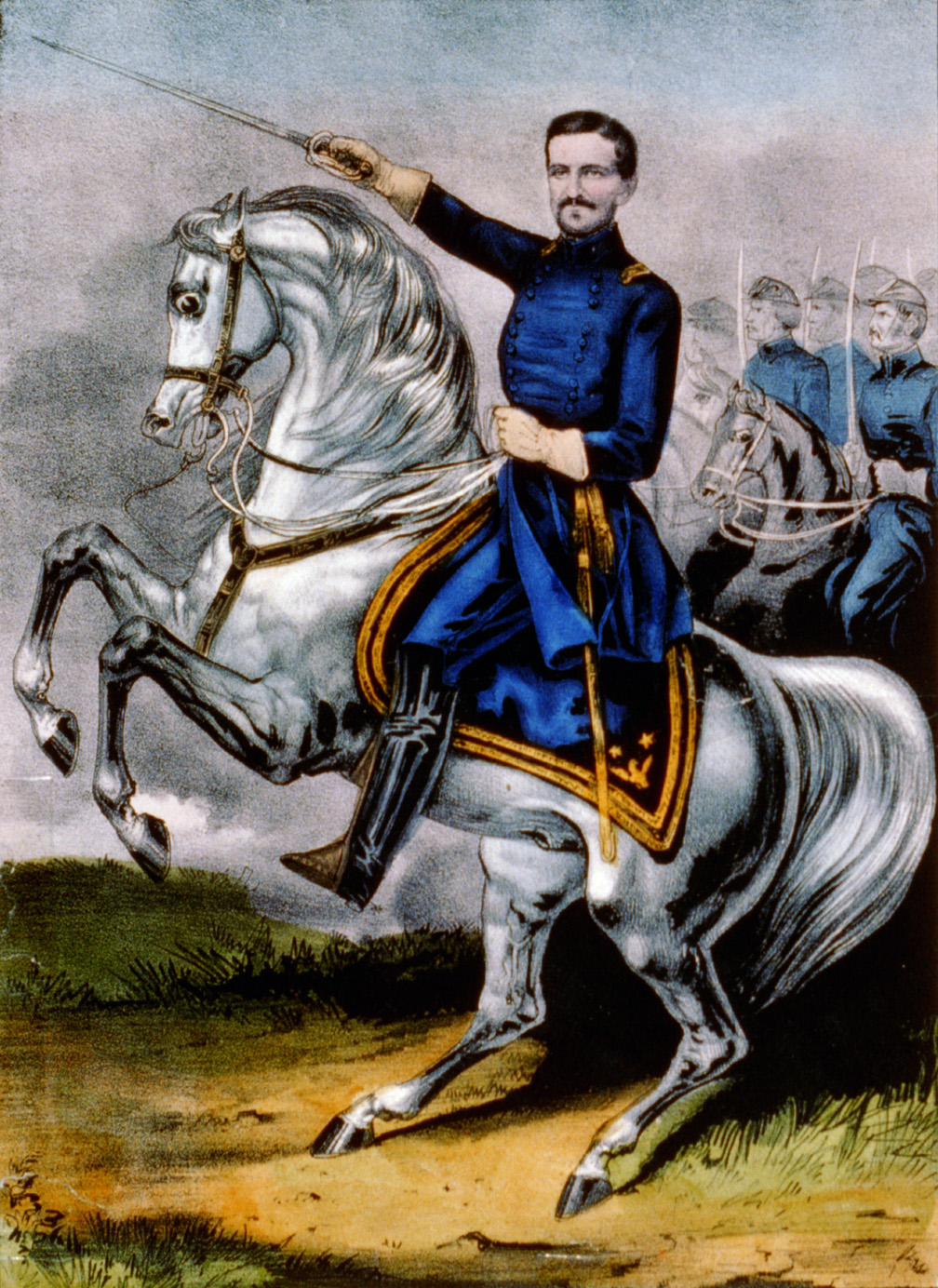
A romantic image of Rosecrans at Murfreesboro, January 2, 1863

Rosecrans's predecessor, Buell, had been relieved because of his desultory pursuit of Confederate Gen. Braxton Bragg following the Battle of Perryville. And yet, Rosecrans displayed similar caution, remaining in Nashville while he reprovisioned his army and improved the training of his cavalry forces. By early December 1862, General-in-Chief Henry W. Halleck had lost his patience. He wrote to Rosecrans, "If you remain one more week in Nashville, I cannot prevent your removal." Rosecrans replied, "I need no other stimulus to make me do my duty than the knowledge of what it is. To threats of removal or the like I must be permitted to say that I am insensible."

In late December, Rosecrans began his march against Bragg's Army of Tennessee, encamped outside Murfreesboro, Tennessee. The Battle of Stones River was the bloodiest battle of the war in terms of percentages of casualties. Both Rosecrans and Bragg planned to attack the other's right flank, but Bragg moved first, early in the morning of December 31, driving the Union army back into a small defensive perimeter. As he realized the severity of the surprise attack, Rosecrans demonstrated the nervous hyperactivity for which he was known in battle. He personally rallied his men along the line, and gave direct orders to any brigades, regiments or companies he encountered. Disregarding his own safety, he rode back and forth at the very front of his line and sometimes between his men and the enemy. As Rosecrans raced across the battlefield directing units, seeming ubiquitous to his men, his uniform was covered with blood from his friend and chief of staff, Col. Julius Garesché, beheaded by a cannonball while riding alongside.

When disaster had enveloped half the army, and from that time to the end, Rosecrans was magnificent. Rising superior to the disaster that in a single moment had annihilated his carefully prepared plans, he grasped in his single hands the fortunes of the day. He stemmed the tide of retreat, hurried brigades and divisions to the point of danger, massed artillery, infused into them his own dauntless spirit, and out of defeat itself, fashioned the weapons of victory. As at Rich Mountain, Iuka and Corinth, it was his personal presence that magnetized his plans into success.

— Whitelaw Reid, Ohio in the War, Volume I

The armies paused on January 1, but the following day, Bragg attacked again, this time against a strong position on Rosecrans's left flank. The Union defense was formidable, and the attack was repulsed with heavy losses. Bragg withdrew his army to Tullahoma, effectively ceding control of Middle Tennessee to the Union. The battle was important to Union morale following its defeat at the Battle of Fredericksburg a few weeks earlier, and President Abraham Lincoln wrote to Rosecrans. "You gave us a hard-earned victory, which had there been a defeat instead, the nation could scarcely have lived over."

==== Tullahoma ====
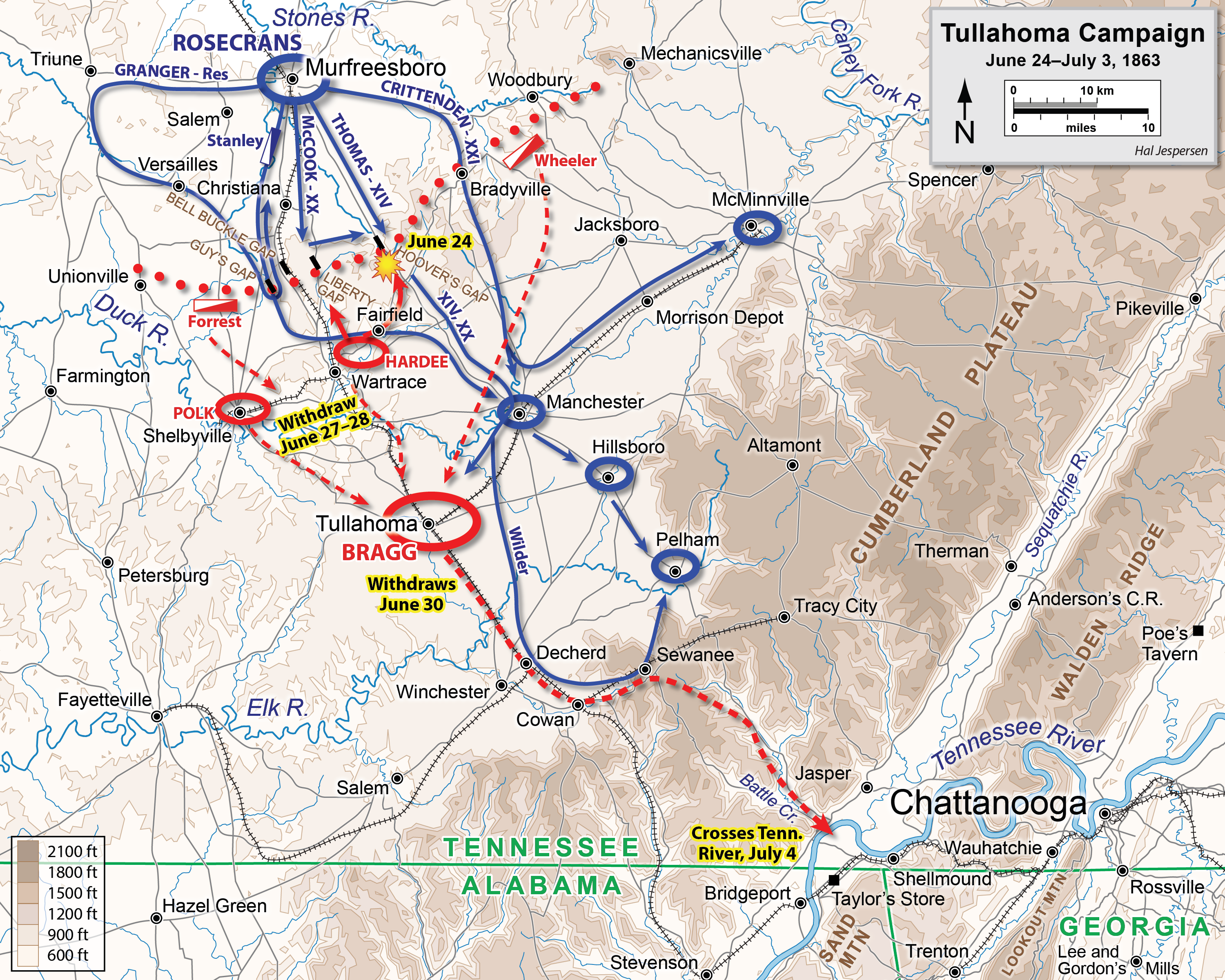
Tullahoma Campaign Confederate Union

Rosecrans's XIV Corps was soon redesignated the Army of the Cumberland, which he kept in place occupying Murfreesboro for almost six months, spending the time resupplying and training, for he was reluctant to advance on the muddy winter roads. He received numerous entreaties from President Lincoln, Secretary of War Stanton, and General-in-Chief Halleck to resume campaigning against Bragg, but rebuffed them through the winter and spring. A primary concern of the government was that if Rosecrans continued to sit idly, the Confederates might move units from Bragg's army in an attempt to relieve the pressure that Union Maj. Gen. Ulysses S. Grant was applying to Vicksburg, Mississippi. Lincoln wrote to Rosecrans, "I would not push you to any rashness, but I am very anxious that you do your utmost, short of rashness, to keep Bragg from getting lost to help Johnston against Grant." Rosecrans offered an excuse that if he started to move against Bragg, Bragg would likely relocate his entire army to Mississippi and threaten Grant's Vicksburg Campaign even more; thus, by not attacking Bragg, he was helping Grant. Frustration with Rosecrans's excuses led Halleck to threaten to relieve him if he did not move, but in the end he merely protested "against the expense to which [Rosecrans] put the government for telegrams."

On June 2, Halleck telegraphed that if Rosecrans was unwilling to move, some of his troops would be sent to Mississippi to reinforce Grant. Rosecrans sent a questionnaire to his corps and division commanders in the hopes of documenting support for his position—that Bragg had so far detached no significant forces to Mississippi, that advancing the Army of the Cumberland would do nothing to prevent any such transfer, and that any immediate advance was not a good idea. Fifteen of the seventeen senior generals supported most of Rosecrans's positions and the counsel against advancing was unanimous. The only dissenter was the newly assigned chief of staff, Brig. Gen. James A. Garfield, who recommended an immediate advance, but historian Steven E. Woodworth opines that he may have been "most concerned with the [political] impression his statement would make in Washington." On June 16, Halleck wired a blunt message: "Is it your intention to make an immediate movement forward? A definite answer, yes or no, is required." Rosecrans responded to this ultimatum: "If immediate means tonight or tomorrow, no. If it means as soon as all things are ready, say five days, yes." Seven days later, early in the morning of June 24, Rosecrans reported that the Army of the Cumberland had begun to move against Bragg.

The Tullahoma Campaign (June 24 – July 3, 1863) was characterized by flawless maneuvers and very low casualties, as Rosecrans forced Bragg to retreat back to Chattanooga. Tullahoma is considered a "brilliant" campaign by many historians. Abraham Lincoln wrote, "The flanking of Bragg at Shelbyville, Tullahoma and Chattanooga is the most splendid piece of strategy I know of." Union Cavalry Corps commander David S. Stanley wrote, "If any student of the military art desires to make a study of a model campaign, let him take his maps and General Rosecrans's orders for the daily movements of his campaign. No better example of successful strategy was carried out during the war than in the Tullahoma campaign."

When Rosecrans' troops entered Shelbyville, they were able to rescue captured Union spy Pauline Cushman. Cushman had been scouting the movements of Gen. Bragg when she was captured (Gen. John Hunt Morgan was one of her escorts to Gen. Bragg for questioning). A military trial found her guilty; she was to be hanged as a spy. Her rescue came just three days prior to her scheduled execution. Rosecrans and Cushman went on to raise over one million dollars for soldiers aid at the 1863 Cincinnati, Ohio Sanitary Fair. In contrast, Rosecrans had approved the courtmartial and hanging of two Confederate Officers, Lawrence Orton Williams and Walter Peters, on June 9, 1863, at Franklin Tenn after these two officers had disguised themselves as Union Officers for the purposes of spying.

Rosecrans did not receive all of the public acclaim his campaign might have under different circumstances. The day it ended was the day Gen. Robert E. Lee launched the ill-fated Pickett's Charge and lost the Battle of Gettysburg. The following day, Vicksburg surrendered to Grant. Secretary Stanton telegraphed Rosecrans, "Lee's Army overthrown; Grant victorious. You and your noble army now have a chance to give the finishing blow to the rebellion. Will you neglect the chance?" Rosecrans was infuriated by this attitude and responded, "Just received your cheering telegram announcing the fall of Vicksburg and confirming the defeat of Lee. You do not appear to observe the fact that this noble army has driven the rebels from middle Tennessee. ... I beg in behalf of this army that the War Department may not overlook so great an event because it is not written in letters of blood."

==== Chickamauga ====
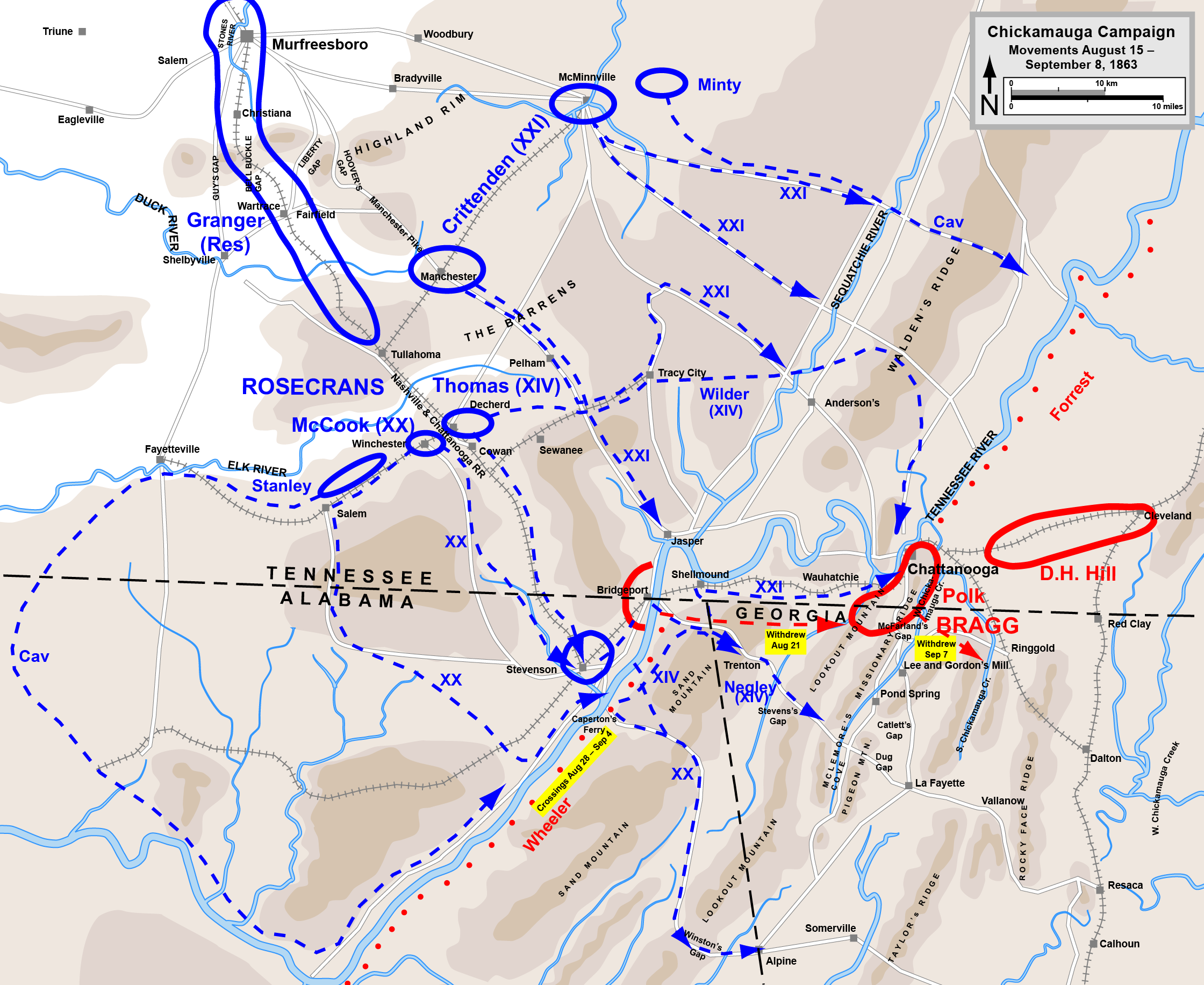
Initial movements in the Chickamauga Campaign, August 15 – September 8, 1863

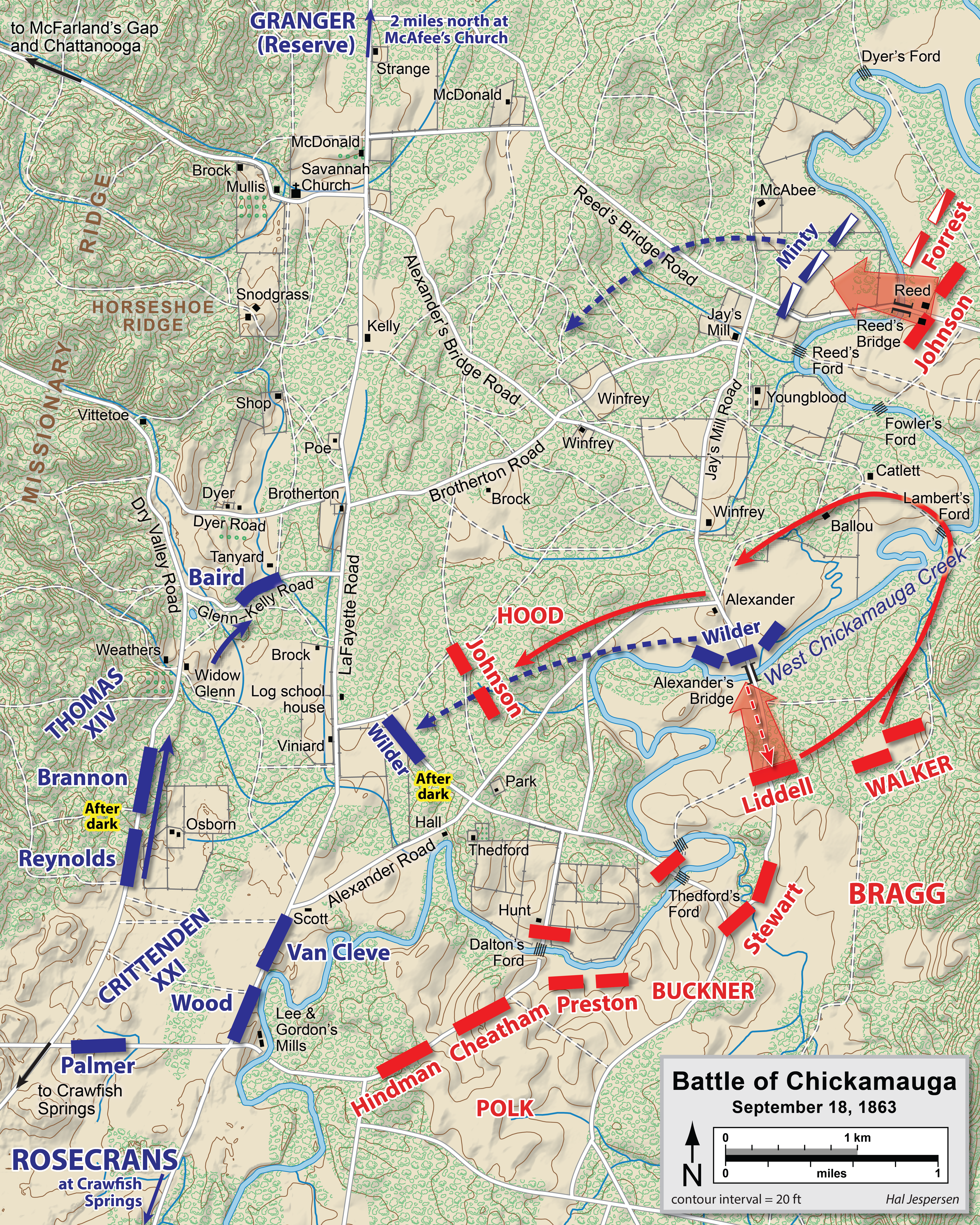
September 18 movements on the eve of the Battle of Chickamauga

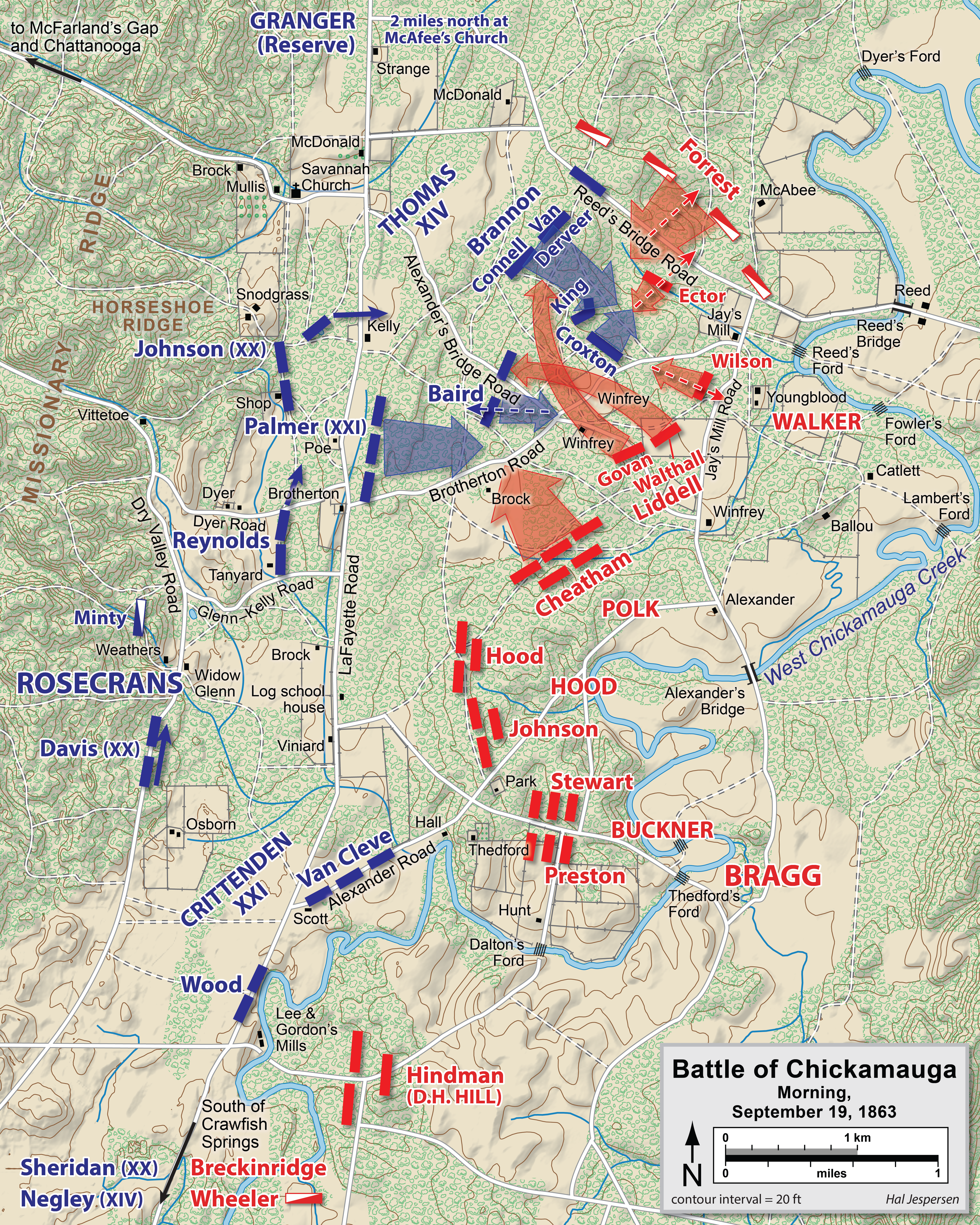
Actions, morning of September 19

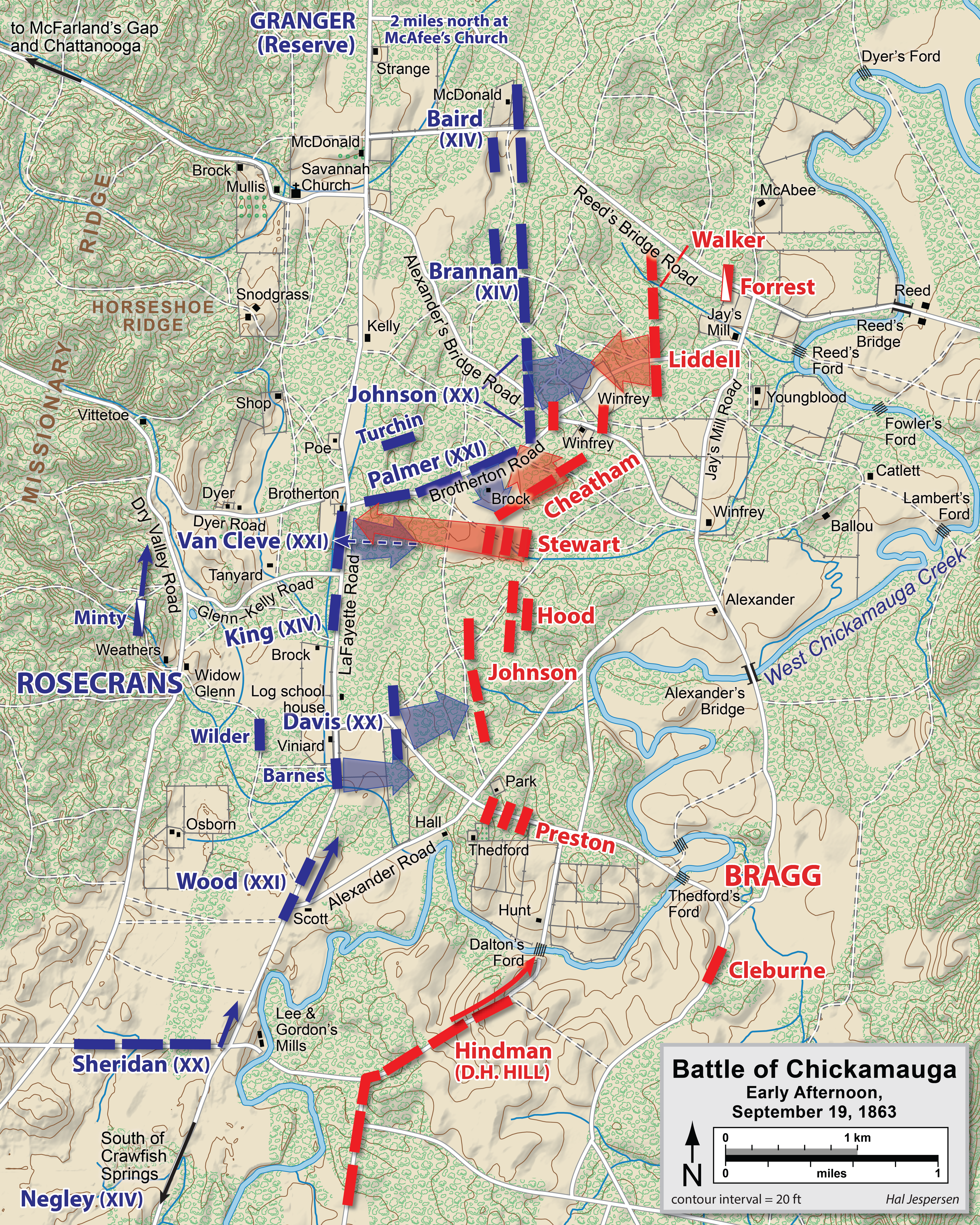
Actions, early afternoon of September 19

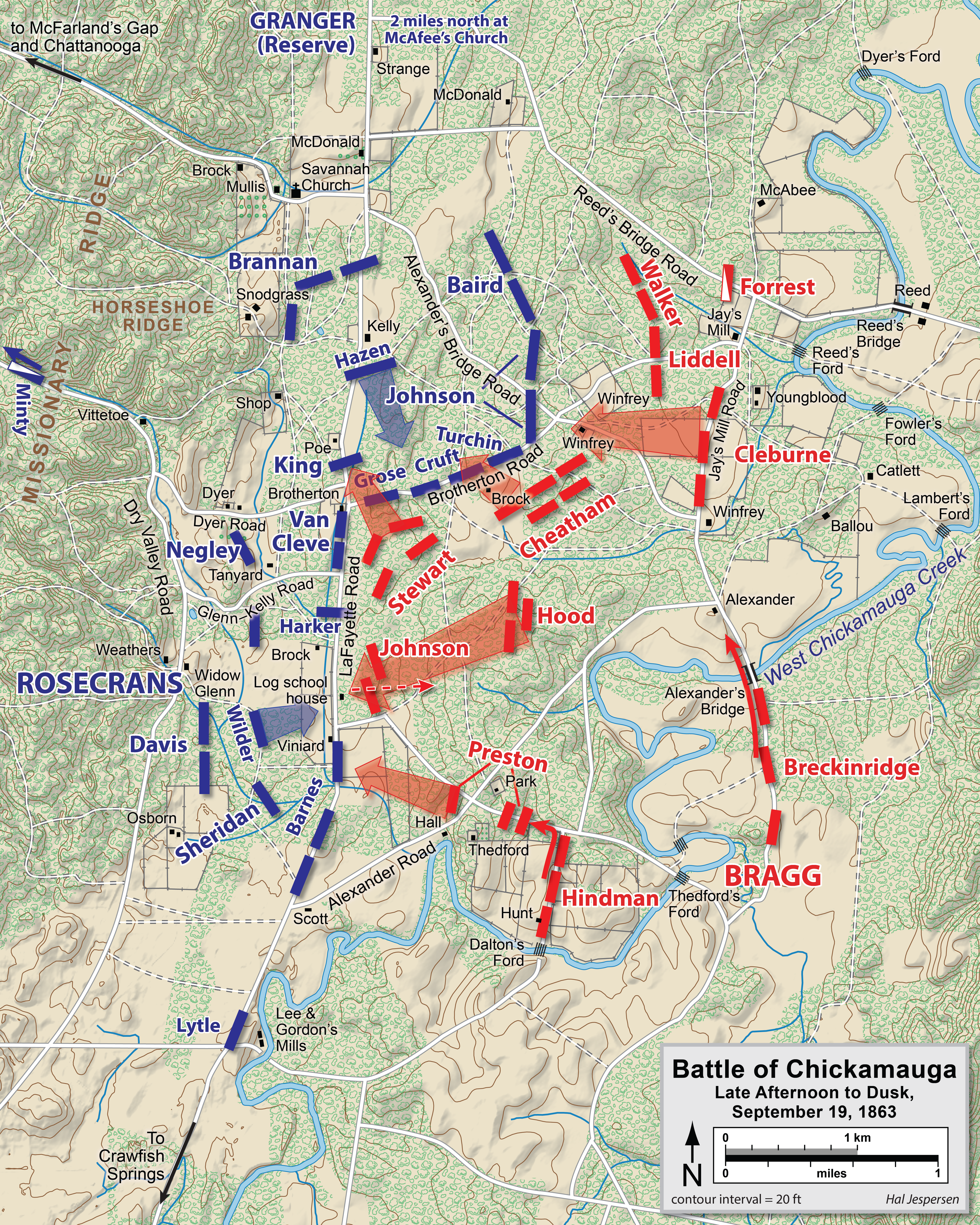
Actions, late afternoon to dark, September 19

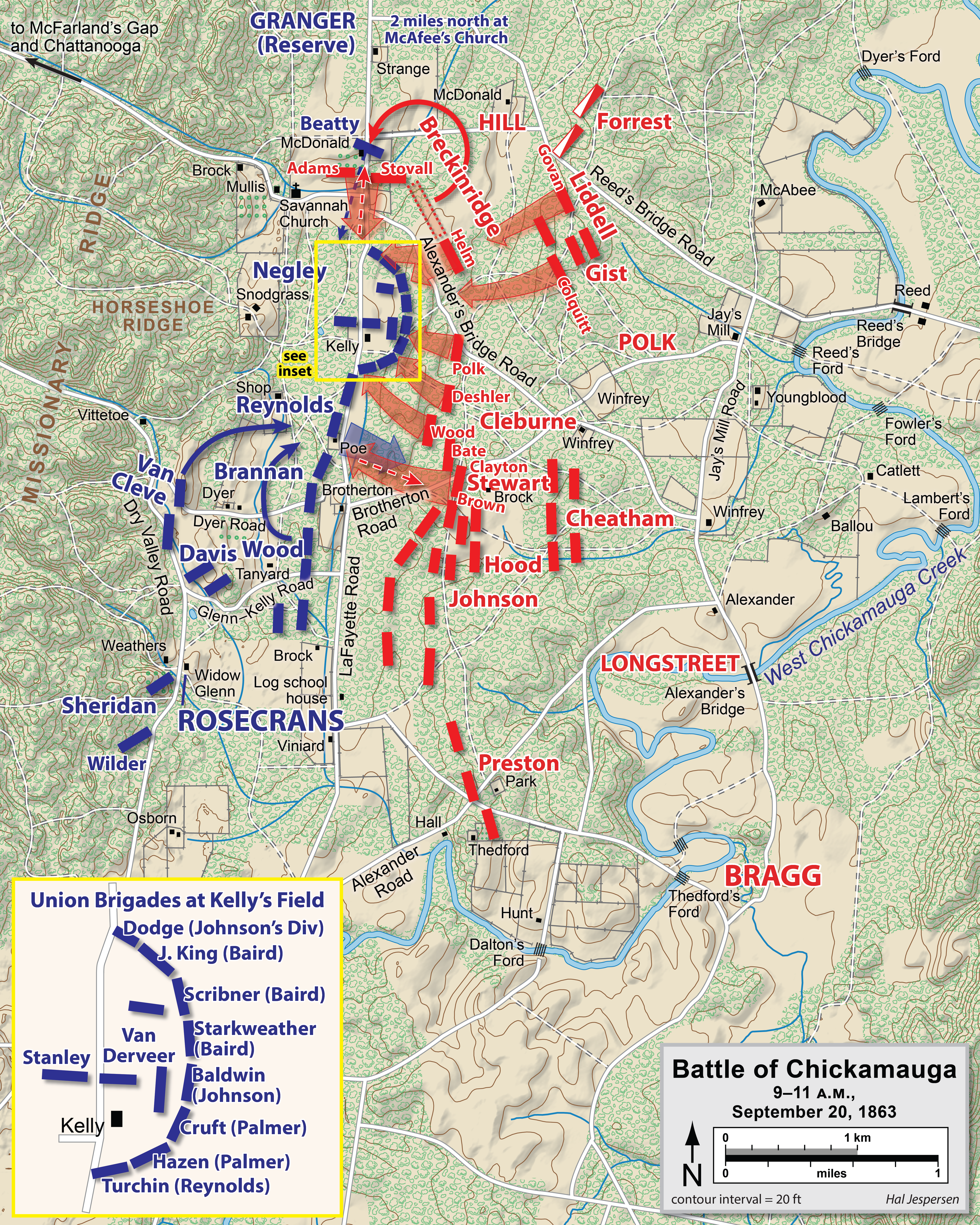
Polk's Right Wing assaults, morning of September 20

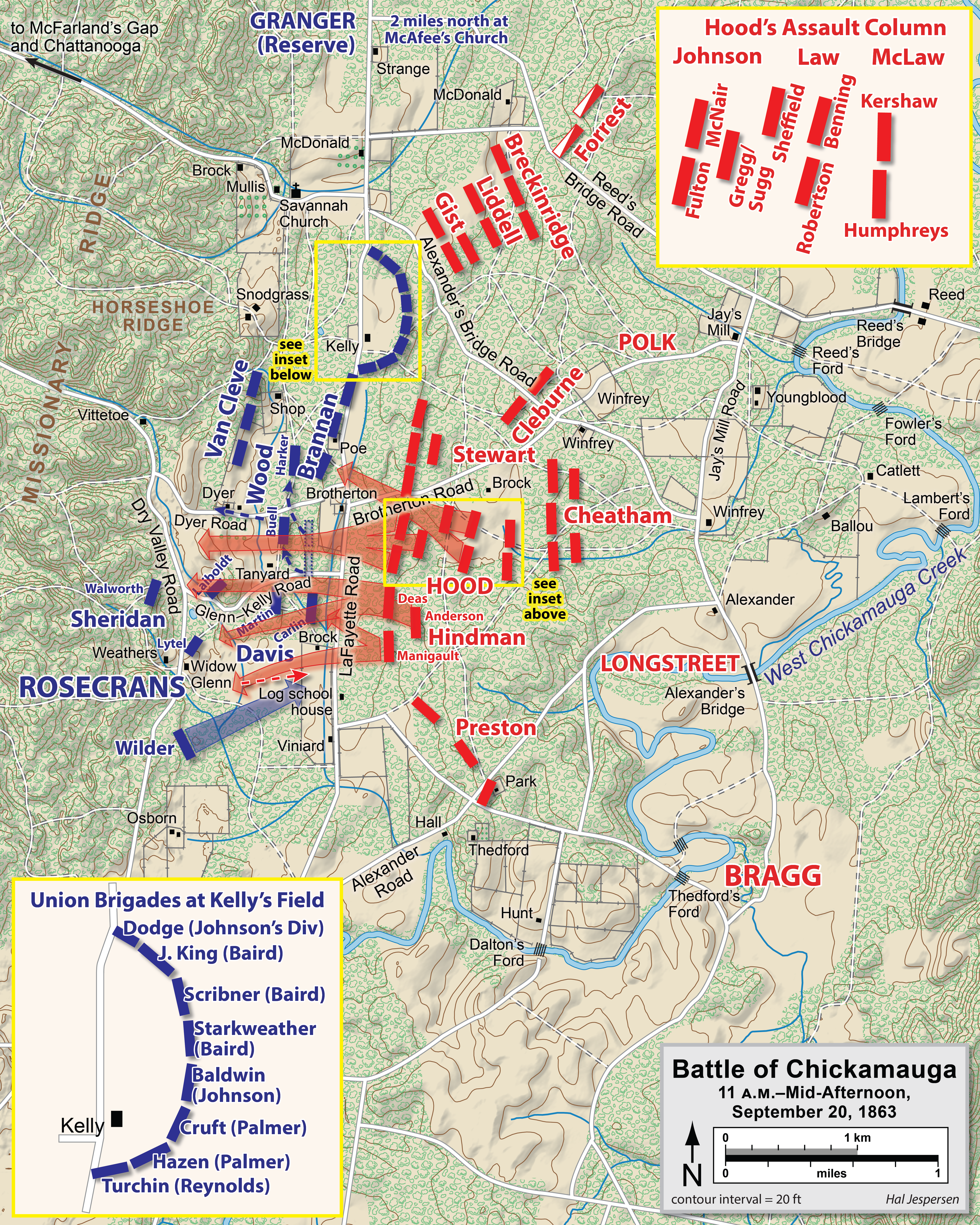
Longstreet's Left Wing assaults, mid-day September 20

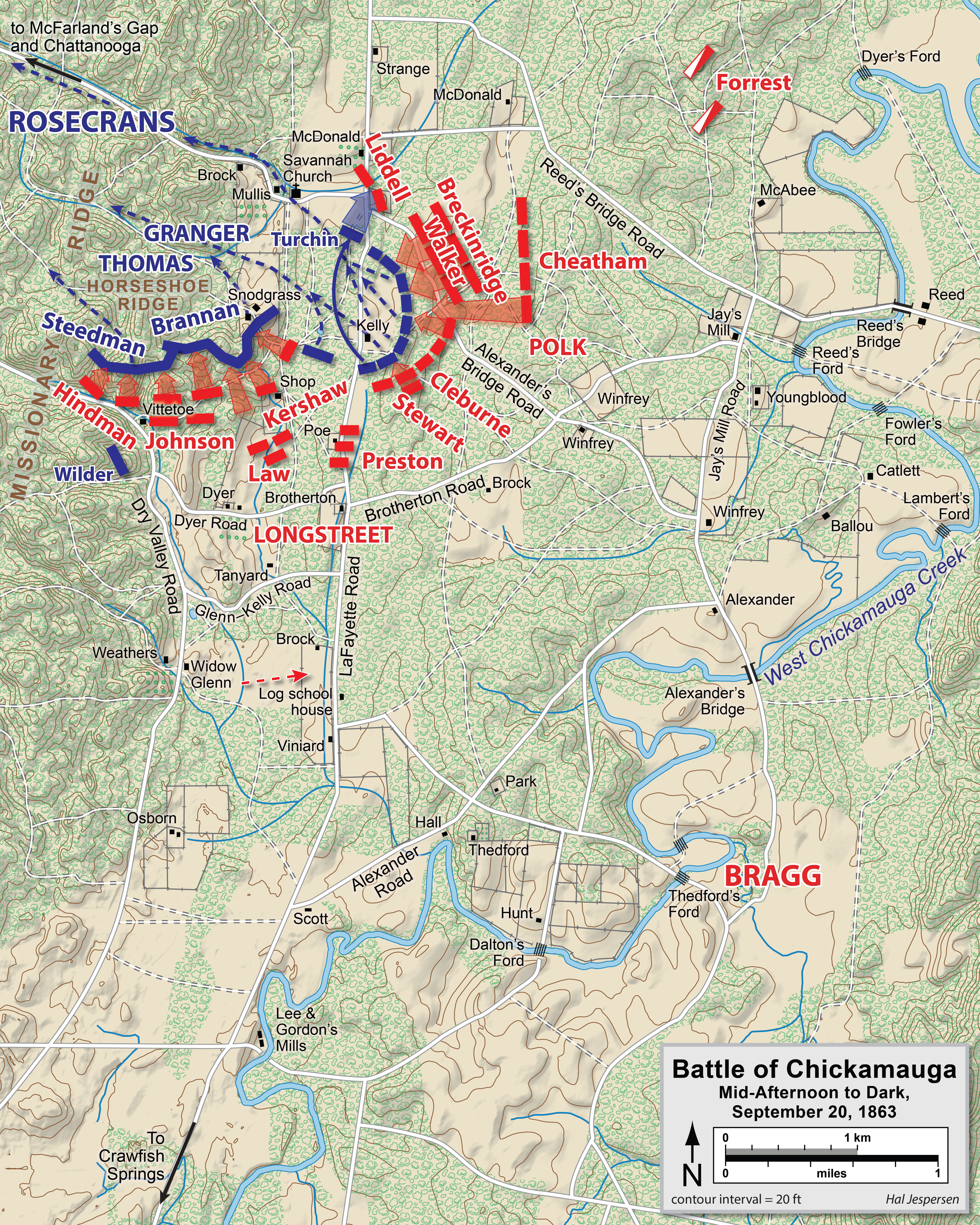
Defense of Horseshoe Ridge and Union retreat, afternoon and evening of September 20

Rosecrans did not immediately pursue Bragg and "give the finishing blow to the rebellion" as Stanton had urged. He paused to regroup and study the logistically difficult choices of pursuit into the mountainous regions to the west and south of Chattanooga. When he was ready to move, he once again maneuvered in a way to disadvantage Bragg. The Confederates abandoned Chattanooga and withdrew into the mountains of northwestern Georgia. Rosecrans threw aside his previous caution under the assumption that Bragg would continue to retreat and began to pursue with his army over three routes that left his corps commanders dangerously far apart. At the Battle of Davis's Cross Roads on September 11, Bragg came close to ambushing and destroying one of Rosecrans's isolated corps. Realizing the threat at last, Rosecrans issued urgent orders to concentrate his army, and the two opponents faced each other across West Chickamauga Creek.

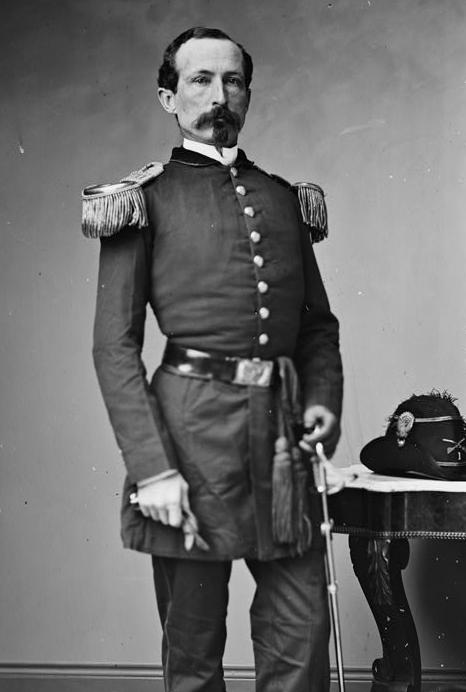
Brig. Gen. Thomas J. Wood

The Battle of Chickamauga began on September 19 with Bragg attacking the not fully concentrated Union army, but he was unable to break through Rosecrans's defensive positions. On the second day of battle, however, disaster befell Rosecrans in the form of his poorly worded order in response to a poorly understood situation. The order was directed to Brig. Gen. Thomas J. Wood, "to close up and support [General Joseph J.] Reynolds's [division]," planning to fill an assumed gap in the line. However, Wood's subsequent movement actually opened up a new, division-sized gap in the line. By coincidence, Lt. Gen. James Longstreet had planned to lead a massive assault in that very area and the Confederates exploited the gap to full effect, shattering Rosecrans's right flank.

The majority of units on the Union right fell back in disorder toward Chattanooga. Rosecrans, Garfield, and two of the corps commanders, although attempting to rally retreating units, soon joined them in the rush to safety. Rosecrans decided to proceed in haste to Chattanooga in order to organize his returning men and the city defenses. He sent Garfield to Maj. Gen. George H. Thomas with orders to take command of the forces remaining at Chickamauga and withdraw.

The Union army managed to escape complete disaster because of the stout defense organized by Thomas on Horseshoe Ridge, heroism that earned him the nickname "Rock of Chickamauga." The army withdrew that night to fortified positions in Chattanooga. Bragg had not succeeded in his objective to destroy the Army of the Cumberland, but the Battle of Chickamauga was nonetheless the worst Union defeat in the Western Theater. Thomas urged Rosecrans to rejoin the army and lead it, but Rosecrans, physically exhausted and psychologically a beaten man, remained in Chattanooga. President Lincoln attempted to prop up the morale of his general, telegraphing "Be of good cheer. ... We have unabated confidence in you and your soldiers and officers. In the main, you must be the judge as to what is to be done. If I was to suggest, I would say save your army by taking strong positions until Burnside joins you." Privately, Lincoln told John Hay that Rosecrans seemed "confused and stunned like a duck hit on the head."

Whether he did or did not know that Thomas still held the field, it was a catastrophe that Rosecrans did not himself ride to Thomas, and send Garfield to Chattanooga. Had he gone to the front in person and shown himself to his men, as at Stone River, he might by his personal presence have plucked victory from disaster, although it is doubtful whether he could have done more than Thomas did. Rosecrans, however, rode to Chattanooga instead.

— The Edge of Glory, Rosecrans biographer William M. Lamers

Although Rosecrans's men were protected by strong defensive positions, the supply lines into Chattanooga were tenuous and subject to Confederate cavalry raids. Bragg's army occupied the heights surrounding the city and laid siege upon the Union forces. Rosecrans, demoralized by his defeat, proved unable to break the siege without reinforcements. Only hours after the defeat at Chickamauga, Secretary Stanton ordered Maj. Gen. Joseph Hooker to travel to Chattanooga with 15,000 men in two corps from the Army of the Potomac in Virginia. Maj. Gen. Ulysses S. Grant was ordered to send 20,000 men under his chief subordinate Maj. Gen. William T. Sherman, from Vicksburg, Mississippi. On September 29, Stanton ordered Grant to go to Chattanooga himself, as commander of the newly created Military Division of the Mississippi. Grant was given the option of replacing the demoralized Rosecrans with Thomas. Although Grant did not have good personal relations with either general, he selected Thomas to command the Army of the Cumberland. Grant traveled over the treacherous mountain supply line roads and arrived in Chattanooga on October 23.

On the morning of the 21st we took the train for the front, reaching Stevenson Alabama, after dark. Rosecrans was there on his way north. He came into my car and we held a brief interview, in which he described very clearly the situation at Chattanooga, and made some excellent suggestions as to what should be done. My only wonder was that he had not carried them out.

— Ulysses S. Grant, Memoirs

Grant executed a plan originally devised by Rosecrans and Brig. Gen. William F. "Baldy" Smith to open the "Cracker Line" and resupply the army and, in a series of battles for Chattanooga (November 23–25, 1863), routed Bragg's army and sent it retreating into Georgia.

==== Missouri and resignation ====
Rosecrans was sent to Cincinnati to await further orders, but ultimately he would play no further large part in the fighting. He was given command of the Department of Missouri from January to December 1864, when he was active in opposing Sterling Price's Missouri raid. During the 1864 Republican National Convention, his former chief of staff, James Garfield, head of the Ohio delegation, telegraphed Rosecrans to ask if he would consider running to be Abraham Lincoln's vice president. The Republicans that year were seeking a War Democrat to run with Lincoln under the temporary name of "National Union Party." Rosecrans replied in a cryptically positive manner, but Garfield never received the return telegram. Friends of Rosecrans speculated that Edwin M. Stanton, Secretary of War, intercepted and suppressed it.

Rosecrans was mustered out of the U.S. volunteer service on January 15, 1866. On June 30, 1866, President Andrew Johnson nominated Rosecrans for appointment as a brevet major general in the regular army, to rank from March 13, 1865, in gratitude for his actions at Stones River; the U.S. Senate confirmed the appointment on July 25, 1866. Rosecrans resigned from the regular army on March 28, 1867. On February 27, 1889, by act of Congress he was re-appointed a brigadier general in the regular army and was placed on the retired list on March 1, 1889.

After the war, Rosecrans became a companion of the District of Columbia Commandery of the Military Order of the Loyal Legion of the United States - a military society of officers who had served in the Union armed forces and their descendants.

== Later life ==
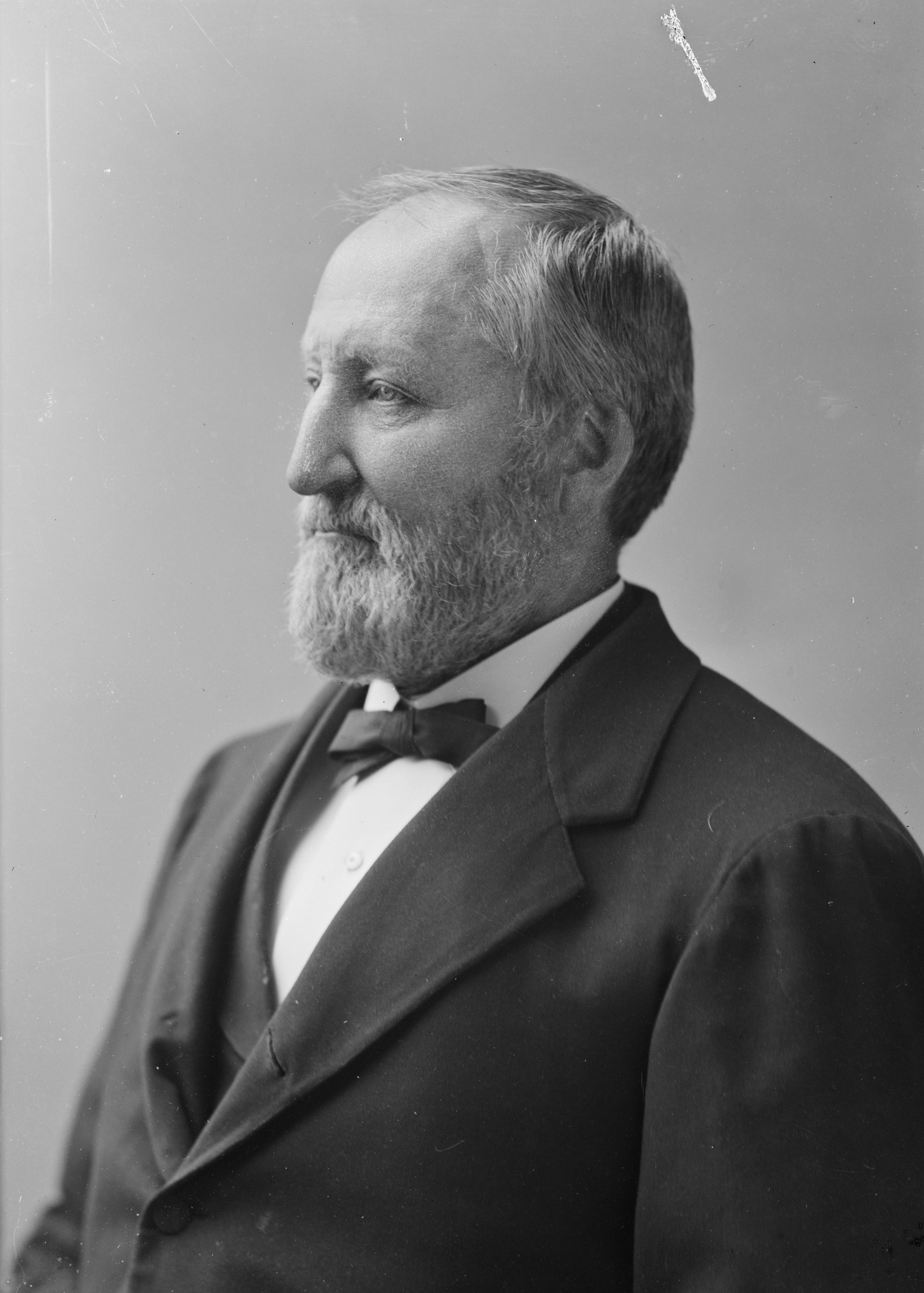
Portrait by C. M. Bell c. 1881–1885

After the war, Rosecrans became interested in railroads and was one of the eleven incorporators of the Southern Pacific Railroad, but his valuable interests in the stock of the railroad were lost to some of the unscrupulous financiers who were his business partners. From 1868 to 1869, Rosecrans served as U.S. Minister to Mexico, but was replaced after just five months when his old nemesis, Ulysses Grant, became president. During this brief service, he became convinced that Mexico would benefit from a narrow-gauge railway and telegraph line from Tampico to the coast, but this venture, from 1869 through 1873, was a failure.

Rosecrans then became interested in civil administration and wrote a book, Popular Government, with a former newspaperman, Josiah Riley, which advocated registration and voting reforms. He was approached by various political parties to run for high office: Governor of Ohio (Union party, 1866); governor of California (Democratic Party, 1868); governor of Ohio (Democratic Party, 1869); U.S Representative from Nevada (Democratic Party, 1876). He refused all of these offers because they conflicted with potentially promising business ventures, leading him to be referred to by the nickname "The Great Decliner."

In 1869, Rosecrans bought 16,000 acres (65 km^{2}) of Rancho San Pedro in the Los Angeles basin for $2.50 per acre ($620/km^{2}), a low price possibly because the land was deemed worthless for lack of a spring for water. The ranch, dubbed "Rosecrans Rancho", was bordered by what would later be Florence Avenue on the north, Redondo Beach Boulevard on the south, Central Avenue on the east, and Arlington Avenue on the west. By the time of Rosecrans's death, his son Carl was living on the estate, but most of the land had been sold parcel by parcel to support the financial needs of mining ventures in which Rosecrans invested.

In 1880, Rosecrans was elected U.S. Representative as a Democrat from California's 1st congressional district. That same year, James Garfield was elected President as a Republican. Rosecrans was distressed to see that Garfield's campaign literature played up his role in the war at Rosecrans's expense. Their former friendship was irretrievably broken. After Garfield's assassination, Charles A. Dana capitalized on the tragedy by publishing the letters written by Garfield after Chickamauga to then-Secretary of the Treasury Salmon P. Chase; the letters may have been the major reason for Rosecrans's loss of political support at the time.

Rosecrans was reelected in 1882 and became the chairman of the House Military Affairs Committee, a position in which he publicly opposed a bill that would provide a pension to former President Grant and his wife. Unaware of the serious financial condition of Grant's family, Rosecrans objected that some of Grant's official statements "were false, and which he knew to be false at the time he made them, and which I have shown in my official reports to be false. I cannot say to the people of this country that a business which has been conducted as to rob poor people of millions, and which, if done on a smaller scale would have sent its managers to prison, shall be considered as important when the principal manager has allowed a great name to be used as the instrument of the robbery." The bill was passed over his objections. When a bill was introduced in 1889 to restore Rosecrans's rank and place him on the retired list, some representatives objected, based on Rosecrans's actions against Grant in 1885, but the bill was passed.

Rosecrans did not seek re-election in 1884. He served as a Regent of the University of California in 1884 and 1885.

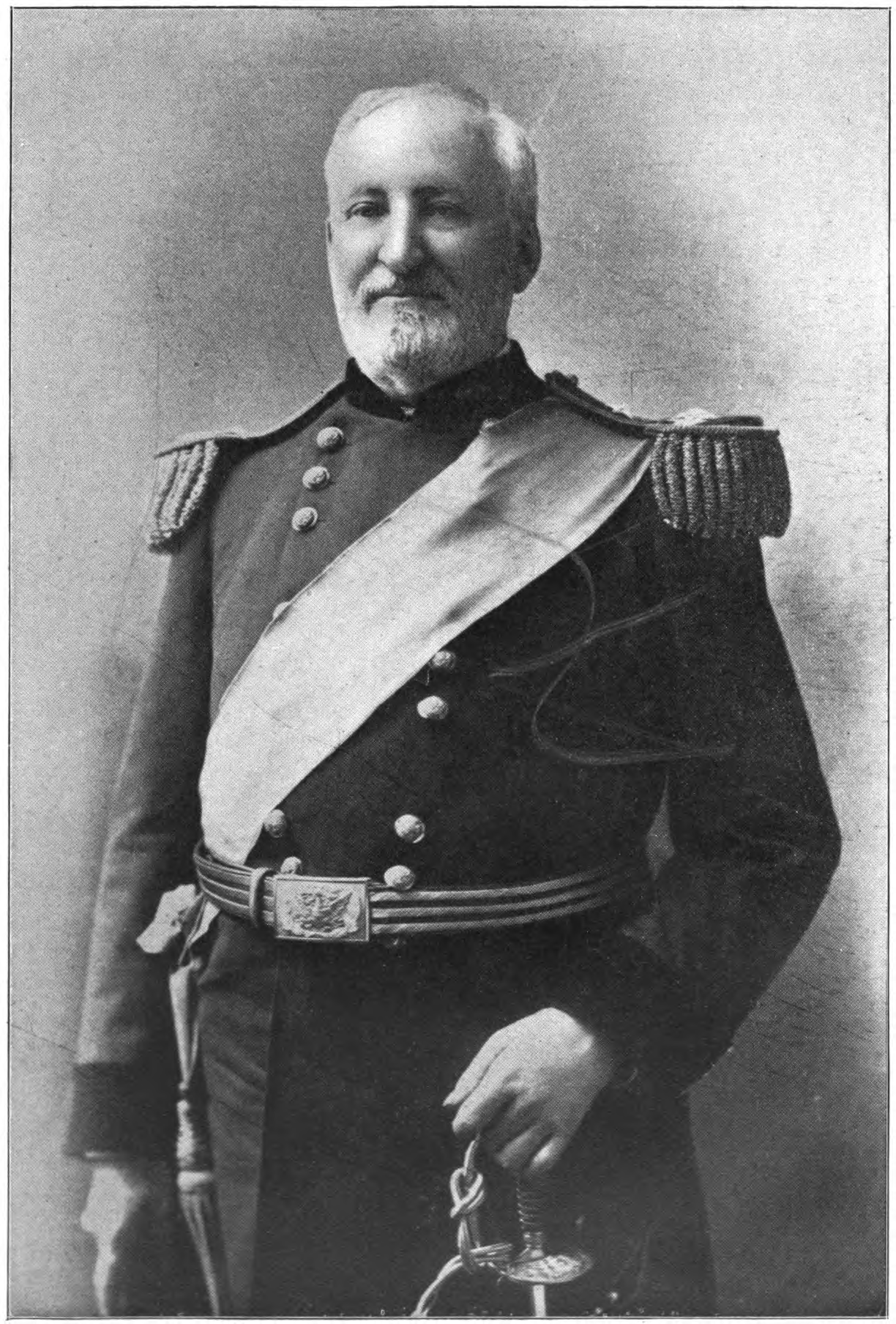
Rosecrans later in life

Although Rosecrans was mentioned on a few occasions as a possible presidential candidate, the first Democratic president elected after the war was Grover Cleveland in 1884. Newspaper stories circulated that Rosecrans was under serious consideration to be appointed his Secretary of War, but he was appointed instead as the Register of the Treasury, serving from 1885 to 1893.

Rosecrans spoke at a grand reunion of Union and Confederate veterans held at the Chickamauga battlefield on September 19, 1889, delivering a moving address praising national reconciliation. The gathering led to Congress establishing the Chickamauga and Chattanooga National Military Park the following year, the nation's first national battlefield park.

In 1896, he was awarded the Laetare Medal, the oldest and most prestigious award for American Catholics, by the University of Notre Dame.

== Death ==
In February 1898, Rosecrans suffered from a cold that turned into pneumonia, but appeared to recover successfully. Then he learned that one of his favorite grandchildren (Rosecrans Toole, the son of Lily and Joseph Kemp Toole, the first Governor of Montana) had died of diphtheria. He was seized with grief and his health failed precipitously. He died on March 11, 1898, at Rancho Sausal Redondo, Redondo Beach, California. His casket lay in state in Los Angeles City Hall, covered by the headquarters flag that flew over Stones River and Chickamauga. In 1908 his remains were interred in Arlington National Cemetery.

== Legacy ==
He was the first colonel of the regiment to which I belonged, my boyhood ideal of a great soldier, and I gladly pay him tribute.

— President William McKinley, 1895 remarks at the dedication of the Ohio Monument at Chickamauga.

Rosecrans' reputation has improved somewhat in recent years. Historian Frank Varney presented a case for review in his book General Grant and the Rewriting of History: How the Destruction of General William S. Rosecrans Influenced Our Understanding of the Civil War.

Fort Rosecrans National Cemetery, in San Diego, California, is named in his honor. Major streets named after William Rosecrans include Rosecrans Avenue, a major east–west street that runs through the southern part of Los Angeles County, and Rosecrans Street in San Diego, which runs near the aforementioned cemetery.

General Rosecrans Elementary School, on Rosecrans and Acacia Avenues in the city of Compton, California, a Los Angeles suburb, bears his name, as does General Rosecrans Elementary in Sunbury, Ohio.

A memorial was constructed on the site of Rosecrans' birthplace and childhood home. A large boulder surrounded by a wrought iron fence holds a plaque in memoriam and rests beside a rural road that bears his name.

An equestrian statue of Rosecrans, resting on a 55,000 pound black granite boulder, is located on the square surrounding the Town Hall of Sunbury, Ohio. Rosecrans' Headquarters in the buildup to the Chickamauga Campaign was listed on the National Register of Historic Places in 1978.

The SS Rosecrans was a troop transport ship used in the early 20th century that saw service in the Pacific. The U.S.A.T. Rosecrans, another similarly named ship, was built as Liberty Ship hull 570 by the Oregon Shipbuilding Corporation and rated to hold 504 troops.

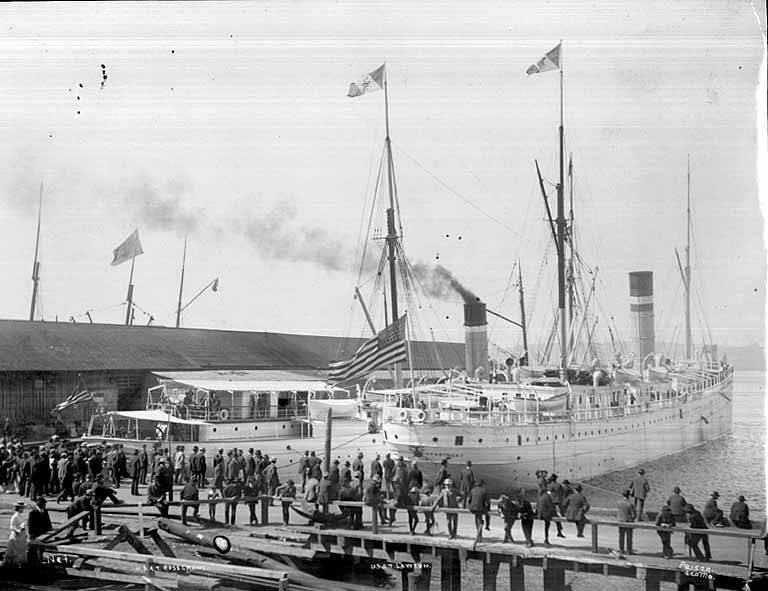
U.S.A.T. Rosecrans at the foot of University Street next to U.S.A.T. Lawton

== See also ==
- List of American Civil War generals (Union)
- Fortress Rosecrans

Military offices
Preceded by John Pope	Commander of the Army of the Mississippi; June 26, 1862 – October 24, 1862	Succeeded by John Alexander McClernand
Preceded by None	Commander of the Army of the Cumberland; October 24, 1862 – October 19, 1863	Succeeded by George H. Thomas
U.S. House of Representatives
Preceded by Horace Davis	Member of the U.S. House of Representatives from California's 1st congressional district 1881–1885	Succeeded by Barclay Henley
Diplomatic posts
Preceded by Marcus Otterbourg	United States Envoy to Mexico; 1868–1869	Succeeded by Thomas H. Nelson
