= Palmetto, Tennessee =

- Unincorporated community
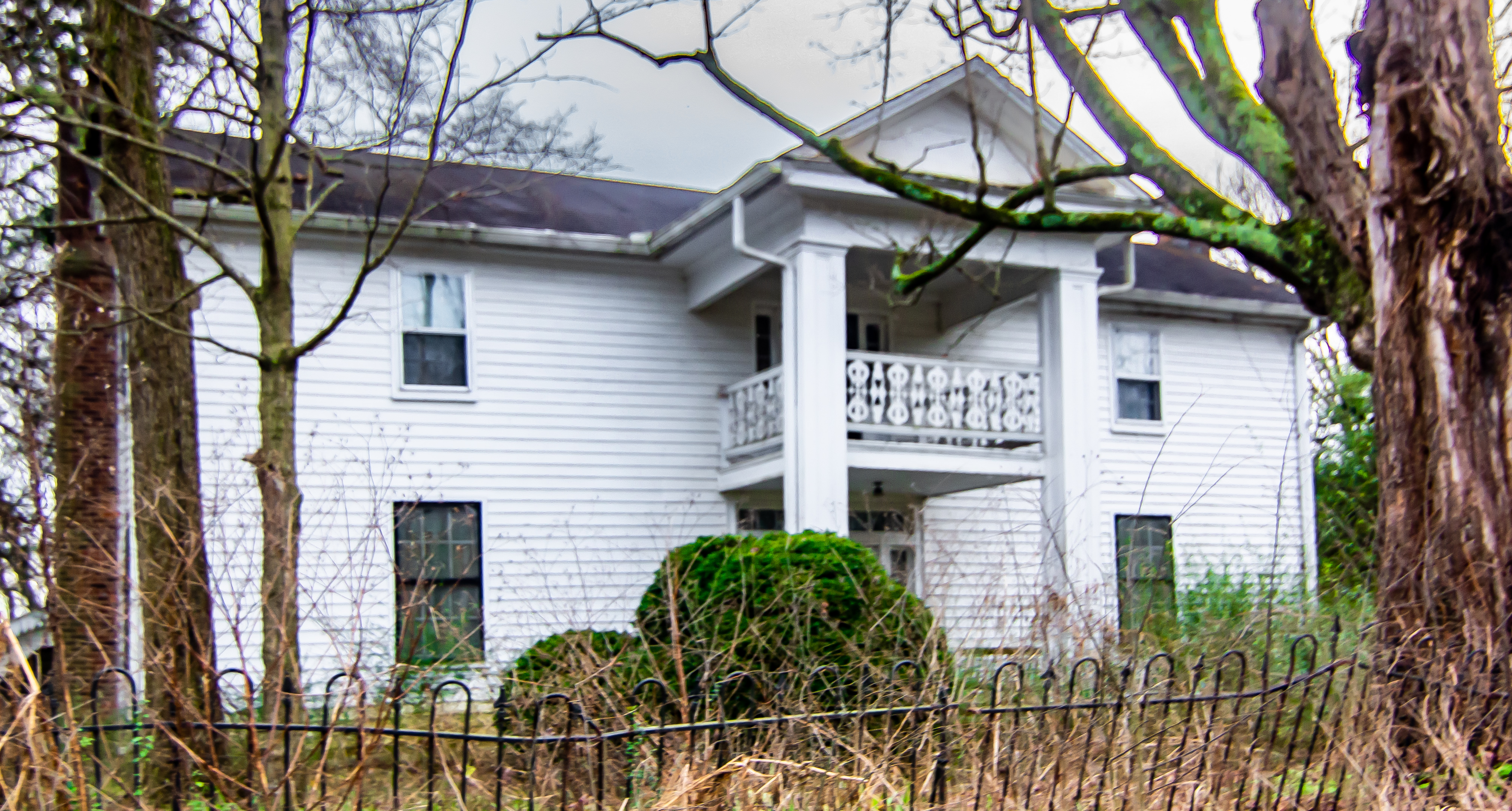
- Montgomery home in Palmetto

- Location within Tennessee Location within the United States
- Coordinates: 35°29′31″N 86°39′52″W
- Country: United States
- State: Tennessee
- County: Bedford
- Elevation: 758 ft (231 m)
- Time zone: UTC-6 (Central (CST))
  - Summer (DST): UTC-5 (CDT)
- GNIS feature ID: 1296702

Palmetto is an unincorporated community in Bedford County, Tennessee, United States.

== History ==
Thomas Montgomery and his family settled here in 1838, and erected a home in 1847. The community around the house—which bordered Marshall County—was first called "County Line". When a post office was established, "County Line" was rejected and changed to "Palmetto". Montgomery became a local merchant, and operated two stores across the road from his home. Montgomery's granddaughter Alice, and her husband, politician James Fount Tillman, lived in the home. The Montgomery home, located on Palmetto Farm, is listed on the National Register of Historic Places.

In 1876, Palmetto had a school, church, steam mill, grist mill, and a population of 50.
