= National Register of Historic Places listings in Lawrence County, Tennessee =

Location of Lawrence County in Tennessee

This is a list of the National Register of Historic Places listings in Lawrence County, Tennessee.

This is intended to be a complete list of the properties and districts on the National Register of Historic Places in Lawrence County, Tennessee, United States. Latitude and longitude coordinates are provided for many National Register properties and districts; these locations may be seen together in a map.

There are 15 properties and districts listed on the National Register in the county.

Contents: Counties in Tennessee
Anderson – Bedford – Benton – Bledsoe – Blount – Bradley – Campbell – Cannon – Carroll – Carter – Cheatham – Chester – Claiborne – Clay – Cocke – Coffee – Crockett – Cumberland – Davidson – Decatur – DeKalb – Dickson – Dyer – Fayette – Fentress – Franklin – Gibson – Giles – Grainger – Greene – Grundy – Hamblen – Hamilton – Hancock – Hardeman – Hardin – Hawkins – Haywood – Henderson – Henry – Hickman – Houston – Humphreys – Jackson – Jefferson – Johnson – Knox – Lake – Lauderdale – Lawrence – Lewis – Lincoln – Loudon – Macon – Madison – Marion – Marshall – Maury – McMinn – McNairy – Meigs – Monroe – Montgomery – Moore – Morgan – Obion – Overton – Perry – Pickett – Polk – Putnam – Rhea – Roane – Robertson – Rutherford – Scott – Sequatchie – Sevier – Shelby – Smith – Stewart – Sullivan – Sumner – Tipton – Trousdale – Unicoi – Union – Van Buren – Warren – Washington – Wayne – Weakley – White – Williamson – Wilson

This National Park Service list is complete through NPS recent listings posted July 31, 2026.

== Listings ==
	Name on the Register	Image	Date listed	Location	City or town	Description
1	Bank of Loretto	Bank of Loretto	November 27, 2019 (#100004682)	200 Broad St. 35°04′40″N 87°26′24″W	Loretto	
2	Crockett Theater	Crockett Theater	July 29, 1997 (#97000804)	205 N. Military Ave. 35°14′31″N 87°20′04″W	Lawrenceburg	
3	Farmers and Merchants Bank	Farmers and Merchants Bank	November 13, 2017 (#100001825)	213 Depot St. 35°19′12″N 87°18′20″W	Ethridge	
4	Garrett House	Garrett House	March 17, 2009 (#09000137)	205 S. Military Ave. 35°14′22″N 87°20′09″W	Lawrenceburg	
5	T.D. Davenport Forge (40LR7)		July 19, 1988 (#88001101)	Address Restricted	Lawrenceburg	
6	Lawrence County Jail	Lawrence County Jail	March 16, 1976 (#76001784)	Waterloo St. 35°14′28″N 87°20′15″W	Lawrenceburg	
7	Lawrenceburg Commercial Historic District	Lawrenceburg Commercial Historic District	April 14, 1992 (#92000346)	Roughly bounded by N. Military St., Public Sq., E. Gaines St., and E. Pulaski St. 35°14′29″N 87°20′04″W	Lawrenceburg	
8	Lawrenceburg No. 1 Hydroelectric Station		April 20, 1990 (#90000308)	Glen Spring Rd. at Horseshoe Bend of Little Shoal Creek; 35°13′43″N 87°21′29″W	Lawrenceburg	
9	Lawrenceburg No. 2 Hydroelectric Station		July 5, 1990 (#90001005)	Mile 51.7 on Shoal Creek near Old U.S. Route 43; 35°12′55″N 87°21′47″W	Lawrenceburg	
10	Mount Zion Methodist Episcopal Church South	Mount Zion Methodist Episcopal Church South	March 10, 1988 (#88000201)	Mount Zion Rd. 35°03′55″N 87°13′57″W	Fall River	
11	Old Natchez Trace	Old Natchez Trace	May 30, 1975 (#75002125)	From the Alabama/Tennessee border to State Route 100 in Davidson County	N.A.	Extends into Davidson, Hickman, Lewis, Maury, Wayne, and Williamson counties
12	Sacred Heart of Jesus Church	Sacred Heart of Jesus Church	October 10, 1984 (#84000093)	Berger St. 35°14′46″N 87°20′07″W	Lawrenceburg	
13	Sacred Heart of Jesus Church	Sacred Heart of Jesus Church	October 10, 1984 (#84000094)	Church St. 35°04′36″N 87°26′36″W	Loretto	Built in 1912
14	St. Joseph Church	St. Joseph Church	October 10, 1984 (#84000113)	304 American Blvd. 35°01′59″N 87°30′11″W	St. Joseph	
15	St. Mary's Cemetery		October 10, 1984 (#84000095)	off Rascal Town Rd. 35°01′53″N 87°24′53″W	Rascal Town	

== Former listing ==
One other property was once listed, but was removed in 2008:

	Name on the Register	Image	Date listed	Date removed	Location	City or town	Description
1	Garner Mill		July 12, 1984 (#84003575)	November 19, 2008	Garner Lane	Lawrenceburg	Destroyed by flooding in 1998

== See also ==
- List of National Historic Landmarks in Tennessee
- National Register of Historic Places listings in Tennessee
