= Liberty Grove, Tennessee =

- Unincorporated community
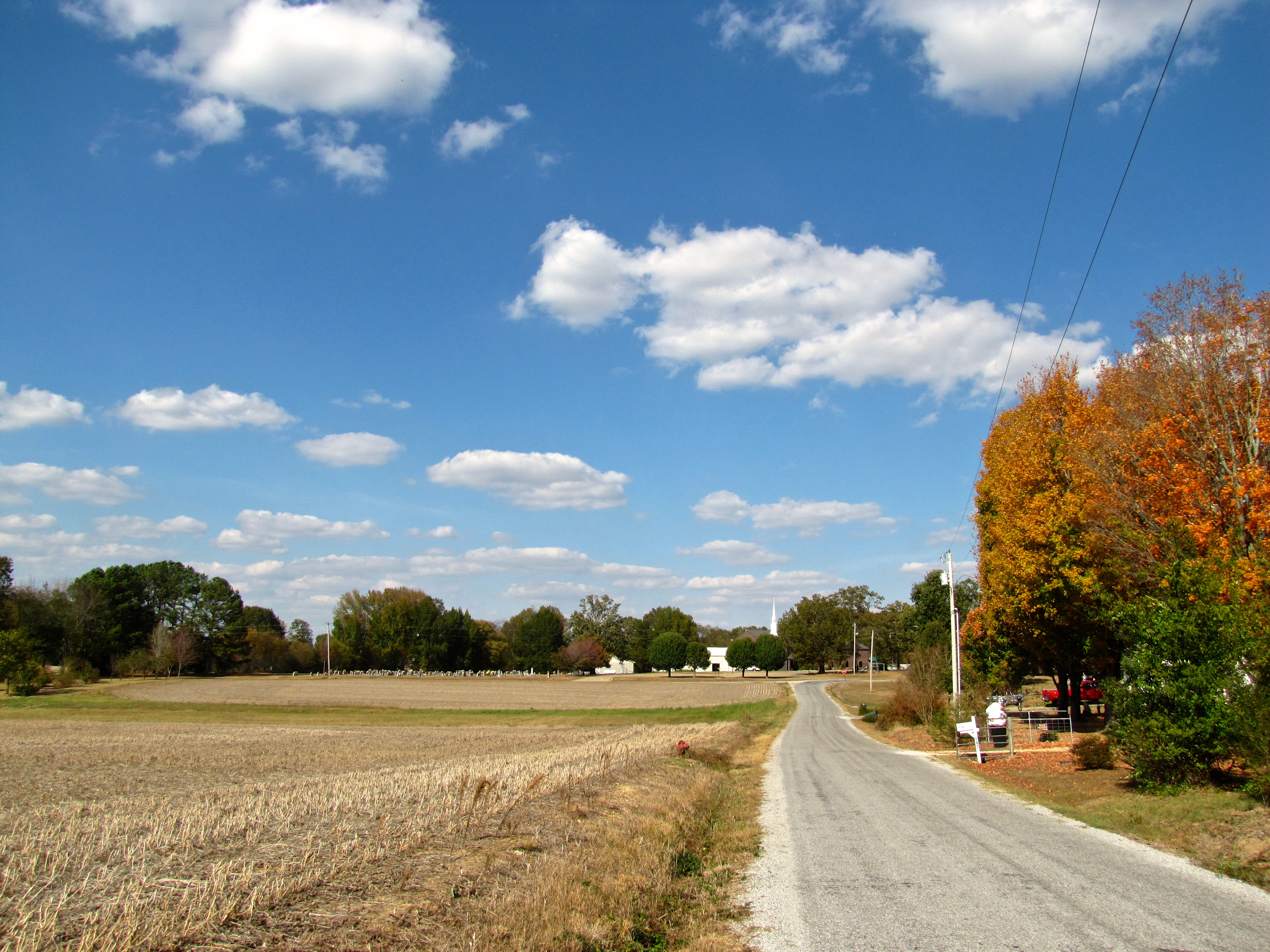
- Buildings and fields in Liberty Grove

- Location within Tennessee Location within the United States
- Coordinates: 35°02′29″N 87°22′59″W
- Country: United States
- State: Tennessee
- County: Lawrence
- Elevation: 873 ft (266 m)
- Time zone: UTC-6 (Central (CST))
  - Summer (DST): UTC-5 (CDT)
- Area code: 931
- GNIS feature ID: 1315389

Liberty Grove is an unincorporated community in Lawrence County, Tennessee, United States. It is situated along Tennessee State Route 227 between Loretto to the northwest and the Alabama state line to the southeast, in southeastern Lawrence County.
