= Grace White =

Grace White may refer to:

- Grace White (1660–1740), Colonial American convicted for witchcraft in Virginia; married name Grace Sherwood
- Grace White, English publisher of York Mercury in 1719 (Timeline of York#18th century)
- Grace Miller White (1868–1957), American romance novelist (Tess of the Storm Country)
- E. Grace White (1890–1975), American ichthyologist, zoologist, author and academic
- Grace White, American lawyer in 1937 (List of first women lawyers and judges in South Carolina#Beaufort County)
- Grace White, British Personal Assistant to the Secretary (1993 New Year Honours#British Empire Medal (BEM)#United Kingdom)
- Bethany Grace White, English illustrator and designer (As You Are (album)#Title and artwork) 2014
- Grace White, American musician and songwriter; member of 2011 duo Grace & Tony
- Grace White, American college basketball forward (2018–19 Denver Pioneers women's basketball team#Roster)
- Grace White, American college basketball guard (2018–19 Northern Kentucky Norse women's basketball team#Roster)
