= Alexander Springs =

Alexander Springs may refer to:

- Alexander Springs Wilderness, a protected area in Florida
- Alexander Springs, Tennessee, an unincorporated community
