= Carpenter's Station, Tennessee =

- Unincorporated community
- Location within Tennessee Location within the United States
- Coordinates: 35°08′20″N 87°23′13″W
- Country: United States
- State: Tennessee
- List of counties in Tennessee: Lawrence County
- Elevation: 955 ft (291 m)
- Time zone: UTC-6 (Central (CST))
  - Summer (DST): UTC-5 (CDT)

Carpenter's Station, Tennessee, is an unincorporated historical community in Lawrence County, Tennessee, United States established in 1884. The name was changed to Springer's Station when the railroad was extended to the community.
