= Robert Hitchcock Spain =

American Methodist bishop (1925–2022)

- Title: Bishop of the United Methodist Church

Personal life
- Born: October 26, 1925 Loretto, Tennessee, U.S.
- Died: September 9, 2022 (aged 96)
- Spouse: Syble Mink (m. 1948)
- Children: 2
- Parent(s): James Thomas Spain and Grace (Hitchcock) Spain
- Education: University of North Alabama (BA); Vanderbilt Divinity School (MDiv); Scarritt College (MA)

Religious life
- Religion: Christianity
- Church: United Methodist Church
- Consecration: July 16, 1988

Robert Hitchcock Spain (October 26, 1925 – September 9, 2022) was an American bishop of the United Methodist Church who was elected in 1988.

== Birth and family ==
Spain was born in Loretto, Tennessee, on October 26, 1925, the son of James Thomas and Grace (Hitchcock) Spain. His parents were both public educators. He married Syble Mink of Lawrenceburg, Tennessee, May 14, 1948. They have two children, Mrs. Philip (Mollie) Johnston, and John Philip Spain. They also have five grandchildren.

== Military service and education ==
At the age of seventeen, Spain joined the U.S. Navy, serving in the South Pacific until the end of World War II.

He then began his education in Pre-med at the University of Tennessee. Upon changing his life's direction into ordained ministry, he entered the University of North Alabama, from which he earned a B.A. degree. Robert then earned the M.Div. degree from Vanderbilt Divinity School, and an M.A. from Scarritt College. He also received an Honorary Doctorate from Lambuth College.

== Ordained ministry ==
While a student, Rev. Spain pastored a circuit of five churches in Wayne County, Tennessee; a station church in Spring Hill; and was the Conference Director of Youth Work. Rev. Spain was ordained deacon in 1953 and elder in 1954, both times by Bishop Roy H. Short. Following Divinity School, Rev. Spain served four successive appointments: Livingston, Lebanon, Belle Meade in Nashville, and Brentwood.

Spain served as the superintendent of the Nashville District, from 1978 to 1983. He was always an active participant in his Annual Conference and the General Church. Spain was elected a delegate to the General Conference of the U.M. Church five consecutive quadrennia, being the first elected the last four of them. He served eight years on the General Board of Church and Society, eight years on the General Board of Publications, and four years on the General Council on Ministries. He was a reserve member of the Judicial Council, as well.

== Episcopal ministry ==
Spain was elected to the episcopacy of the U.M. Church by the 1988 Southeastern Jurisdictional Conference. He was consecrated to this office on July 16, 1988. Present at his consecration was Bishop Roy H. Short, who had ordained him 30+ years earlier.

Upon his election and consecration, Bishop Spain was assigned to the Louisville Episcopal Area (1988–92), serving as Presiding Bishop of the Louisville and Kentucky Annual Conferences, and of the Red Bird Missionary Conference (located in southeastern Kentucky).

Upon his retirement August 1992, Bishop Spain taught clergy and laity through the Focus on Ministry seminar, sponsored by the United Methodist Publishing House in Nashville. Upon the death of Bishop Joseph B. Bethea in South Carolina, the Southeastern Jurisdictional College of Bishops assigned Bishop Spain to the South Carolina Conference until August 1996.

== Death ==
Spain died on September 9, 2022, at the age of 96.

== See also ==
- List of bishops of the United Methodist Church
