= Saint Joseph, Tennessee =

- City
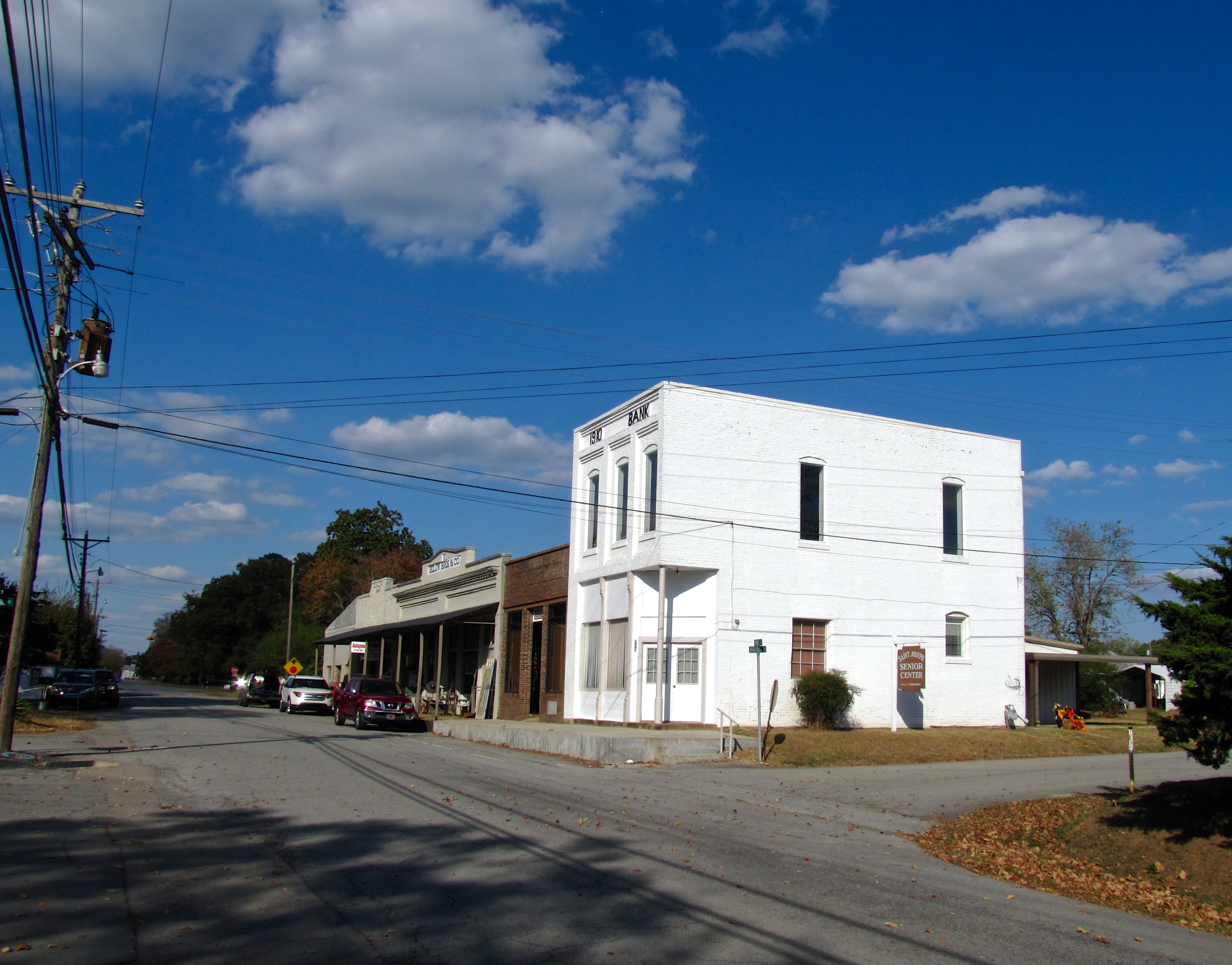
- Buildings along Main Street

- Location of St. Joseph in Lawrence County, Tennessee.
- Coordinates: 35°2′6″N 87°30′8″W
- Country: United States
- State: Tennessee
- County: Lawrence

Area
  - Total: 3.76 sq mi (9.75 km^{2})
  - Land: 3.76 sq mi (9.75 km^{2})
  - Water: 0 sq mi (0.00 km^{2})
- Elevation: 794 ft (242 m)

Population (2020)
  - Total: 790
  - Density: 209.8/sq mi (80.99/km^{2})
- Time zone: UTC-6 (Central (CST))
  - Summer (DST): UTC-5 (CDT)
- ZIP code: 38481
- Area code: 931
- FIPS code: 47-66160
- GNIS feature ID: 1300456

Saint Joseph (usually shortened to St. Joseph) is a city in Lawrence County, Tennessee, United States. The population was 782 at the 2010 census, down from 829 in 2000.

== History ==
The St. Joseph area was settled by German Catholic immigrants in the early 1870s. These settlers established St. Joseph Catholic Church, which is still home to a Catholic parish. By the late 1880s, St. Joseph had about twenty-five houses, a school, and a store.

== Geography ==
St. Joseph is situated on a relatively broad ridge between the Shoal Creek Valley to the west and the Bluewater Creek Valley to the east. Little Bluewater Creek, a tributary of the latter, flows through St. Joseph. The city's boundaries stretch northeastward to the outskirts of Loretto and southward to the Tennessee-Alabama state line.

U.S. Route 43 traverses St. Joseph, connecting the city to Lawrenceburg to the northeast and the Muscle Shoals area to the south. Tennessee State Route 227 connects St. Joseph with Iron City in the Shoal Creek Valley to the west.

According to the United States Census Bureau, the city has a total area of 3.6 square miles (9.3 km^{2}), all land.

== Demographics ==
Historical population
Census	Pop.	Note	%±
1960	547		—
1970	637		16.5%
1980	897		40.8%
1990	789		−12.0%
2000	829		5.1%
2010	782		−5.7%
2020	790		1.0%

=== 2020 census ===
Saint Joseph racial composition
Race	Number	Percentage
White (non-Hispanic)	747	94.56%
Native American	3	0.38%
Asian	3	0.38%
Other/Mixed	21	2.66%
Hispanic or Latino	16	2.03%

As of the 2020 United States census, there was a population of 790, with 349 households and 225 families residing in the city.

=== 2000 census ===
As of the census of 2000, there was a population of 829, with 342 households and 247 families residing in the city. The population density was 231.1 inhabitants per square mile (89.2/km^{2}). There were 374 housing units at an average density of 104.2 per square mile (40.2/km^{2}). The racial makeup of the city was 98.19% White, 0.97% African American, 0.12% Native American, and 0.72% from two or more races. Hispanic or Latino of any race were 2.29% of the population.

There were 342 households, out of which 32.7% had children under the age of 18 living with them, 52.9% were married couples living together, 14.3% had a female householder with no husband present, and 27.5% were non-families. 24.9% of all households were made up of individuals, and 14.3% had someone living alone who was 65 years of age or older. The average household size was 2.42 and the average family size was 2.88.

In the city, the population was spread out, with 24.6% under the age of 18, 9.0% from 18 to 24, 28.0% from 25 to 44, 23.5% from 45 to 64, and 14.8% who were 65 years of age or older. The median age was 37 years. For every 100 females, there were 90.1 males. For every 100 females age 18 and over, there were 85.5 males.

The median income for a household in the city was $27,961, and the median income for a family was $30,781. Males had a median income of $26,375 versus $20,486 for females. The per capita income for the city was $13,038. About 7.6% of families and 14.1% of the population were below the poverty line, including 20.2% of those under age 18 and 14.4% of those age 65 or over.
