= Grace & Tony =

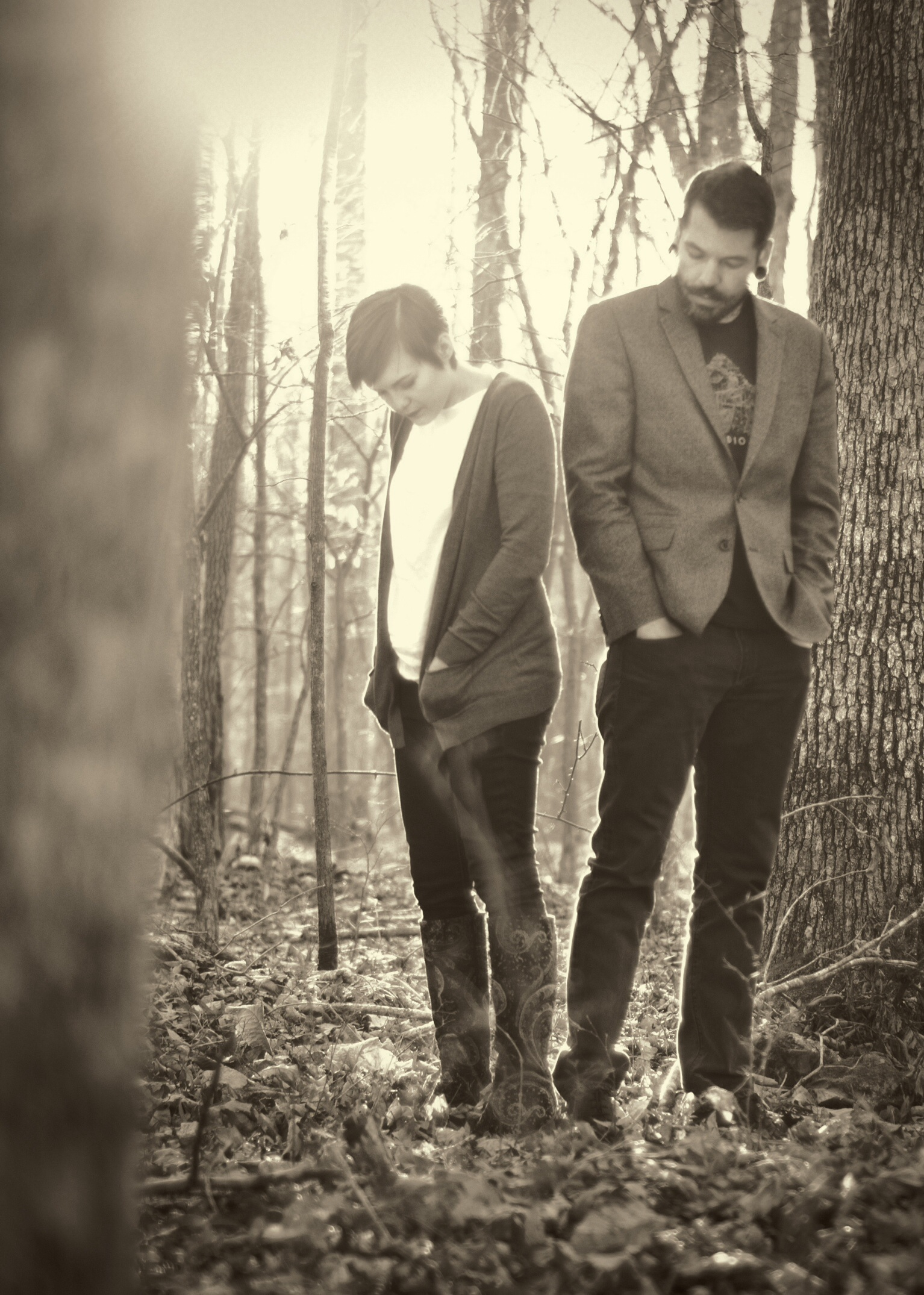

Background information
- Origin: Loretto, Tennessee, United States
- Genres: Americana, bluegrass, alt-country, neo-folk, folk rock, progressive folk, alternative folk, progressive country
- Instruments: Vocals, guitar, banjo, mandolin, ukulele, kazoo
- Years active: 2011–2016
- Label: Rock Ridge Music
- Website: www.graceandtonymusic.com

Grace & Tony (last name White) are an American husband-and-wife music duo based in Loretto, Tennessee, United States, who play a blend of Americana/bluegrass music called "punkgrass," a combination of punk, folk, bluegrass, and Texas swing. They have released an EP (Inside A 7-Track Mind, 2011) and an album (November, 2013). Grace & Tony have toured nationally, headlined the historic Crockett Theater (in Lawrenceburg, Tennessee), appeared at the Kennedy Center in Washington, D.C., and performed twice on the Daytrotter Sessions, as well as performed for BalconyTV, Jimmy Lloyd's Songwriter Showcase, and Knoxville, Tennessee's Blue Plate Special programs. In addition, two of their videos ("Let You Down," “November") have received regular rotation on The Country Network, as well as airplay on CMT Edge and GAC. In April 2014, the pair launched a new video series entitled Grace & Tony Greenroom Sessions. The sessions feature performance clips filmed backstage with fellow musicians shot on an iPhone. Partner site TheBoot.com world premieres session clips, which have included performances with Malcolm Parson (Carolina Chocolate Drops), Christian Lopez Band, and Misty Mountain String Band.

On May 10, 2016, the duo announced on Instagram that they would be disbanding to focus on parenthood, after a final concert on May 21 in Florence, Alabama.

== Background ==
Both Grace (née Shultz) and Tony grew up in Lawrence County, Tennessee.

The pair was exposed to music early on in their lives by their musical families (Grace's liked the Southern styles from gospel and bluegrass all the way to rock, while Tony learned from his brother, John Paul White of The Civil Wars fame). Grace used to sing in church when she was younger, was in high school chorus, and was taught to play the guitar by her grandfather starting at the age of 8. She eventually ended up playing bluegrass music, performing on mandolin, banjo, and acoustic guitar. Tony, who began playing guitar at age 15, was playing punk music before he met Grace. In Grace & Tony, he plays both acoustic guitar and baritone ukulele.

== Becoming a duo ==
They met November 21, 2010. After developing a crush on Grace, Tony asked her to jam when he was between bands, and the "punkgrass" sound that evolved was a natural fusion of their music backgrounds: playing punk rock tunes on acoustic instruments such as guitar, banjo, mandolin, and ukulele. Typically Tony leans toward the melodic side of songwriting while Grace leans toward the lyrical.

== Discography ==
=== Inside A 7-Track Mind ===
Grace & Tony honed their new-found brand of music on the sidewalks of downtown Nashville, Tennessee, and ended up working with Lloyd Aur Norman and Stephen D. Jones of Villain Place in Nashville to record their debut EP, Inside A 7-Track Mind. The EP was released in 2011 and is an acoustic recording.

Track Listing

1. 911 Away
2. Stacked to Kill
3. Parting Gifts
4. Let You Down
5. Clipped My Wings
6. If You…
7. One for the Trail

=== November ===
As part of preparation for a full-length release, Grace & Tony launched a successful Kickstarter campaign and the resulting November was released on November 11, 2013. Accompanied by a full band to fill out their unique sound, they worked again with Lloyd Aur Norman and Stephen D. Jones at Villain Place in Nashville to record the album.

Their songs tend to feature non-traditional stories, including lyrical tales of murder, addiction, and lost love. A lover of English literature and old-style murder mysteries, Grace's influence on the album is evident, with songs about heroic protagonists in a variety of settings taking on evil mastermind kidnappers, electromagnetic bombs, and schizophrenia. The title track, "November," is about Grace & Tony's love story. Additional performers on the album include Robert Jones (drums/percussion), David Follis (drums, percussion), Tori Hundley (bass), Jason Dietz (bass), John Judkins (lap steel), Nikki Oliff (accordion) and Daniel Kenney (trumpet).

Track listing:

1. Hey Grace, Hey Tony
2. Holy Hand Grenade
3. November
4. The Chameleon
5. Can We Save This?
6. Electricity Bomb
7. Where Emma Meets John
8. Resonate
9. Grassphemy
10. From Me To Me
11. La Carrera

== Touring ==
Grace & Tony have shared the stage with artists such as The Lone Bellow, Billy Joe Shaver, Dom Flemons, and Carolina Chocolate Drops, as well as hitting the high seas on the Cayamo music cruise (February 2014), playing alongside the likes of Kris Kristofferson, Ricky Scaggs, Bruce Hornsby, and Lyle Lovett. In addition to US touring, they have played a string of dates in the UK.

== Personal life ==
The pair married in July 2013. Grace graduated from nursing school in late 2013.
