= Spring Creek, Lawrence County, Tennessee =

Spring Creek, Tennessee
- Unincorporated community
- Location within Tennessee Location within the United States
- Coordinates: 35°12′47″N 87°26′50″W
- Country: United States
- State: Tennessee
- County: Lawrence
- Elevation: 764 ft (233 m)
- Time zone: UTC-6 (Central (CST))
  - Summer (DST): UTC-5 (CDT)
- Area code: 931
- GNIS feature ID: 1271063

Spring Creek is an unincorporated community in Lawrence County, Tennessee, United States. Spring Creek is 6.7 miles (10.8 km) west-southwest of Lawrenceburg.
