= Appleton, Tennessee =

- Unincorporated community
- Location within Tennessee Location within the United States
- Coordinates: 35°01′25″N 87°14′00″W
- Country: United States
- State: Tennessee
- County: Lawrence
- Elevation: 659 ft (201 m)
- Time zone: UTC-6 (Central (CST))
  - Summer (DST): UTC-5 (CDT)
- Area code: 931
- GNIS feature ID: 1275827

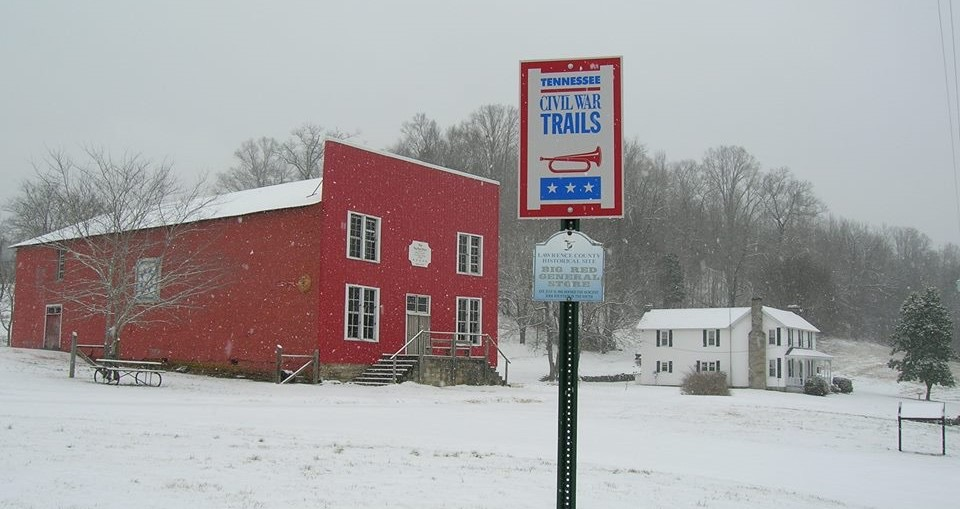
The Big Red Store and the Kelton/Butler House in Appleton

Appleton is an unincorporated community in Lawrence County, Tennessee, United States.
