= Iron City Blues =

- DVD cover
- Directed by: Scott C. Jackson
- Produced by: Matthew Pessoni
- Starring: Big Mike Griffin
- Cinematography: Scott Pessoni
- Music by: Big Mike Griffin
- Release date: 2008
- Running time: 52 min.
- Country: United States
- Language: English

Iron City Blues is an independent documentary which chronicles the creation of a blues song about the town of Iron City, Tennessee.

== Overview ==
Iron City Blues follows biker/bluesman Big Mike Griffin as he journeys to the rural town of Iron City, Tennessee in order to create a blues song based on its legendary status as a lawless town. While en route to Iron City, Big Mike Griffin is joined by his friend Jason Neese, a former U.S. Marine, who has been to Iron City in the past and agrees to serve as his guide. The two men ride through Tennessee's backwoods into Iron City where Big Mike interviews a wide assortment of area residents including the town's mayor, one of the town's former police officers, and a group of local lawnmower racers. Their visit concludes with an interview by campfire light with moonshiner "Monkey Tidwell".

The documentary then follows Big Mike Griffin into the Switchyard Recording Studio where he records the song "Iron City" along with musicians Bob Babbitt, Miranda Louise, Johnny Bird and James "Fish" Michie.

The film's finale features a live concert where Big Mike Griffin and his band debut the song "Iron City" to a crowd which includes a number of Iron City residents who were interviewed in the film.
