= Sacred Heart of Jesus Church (Loretto, Tennessee) =

Historic church in Tennessee, United States

- Sacred Heart Catholic Church
- U.S. National Register of Historic Places
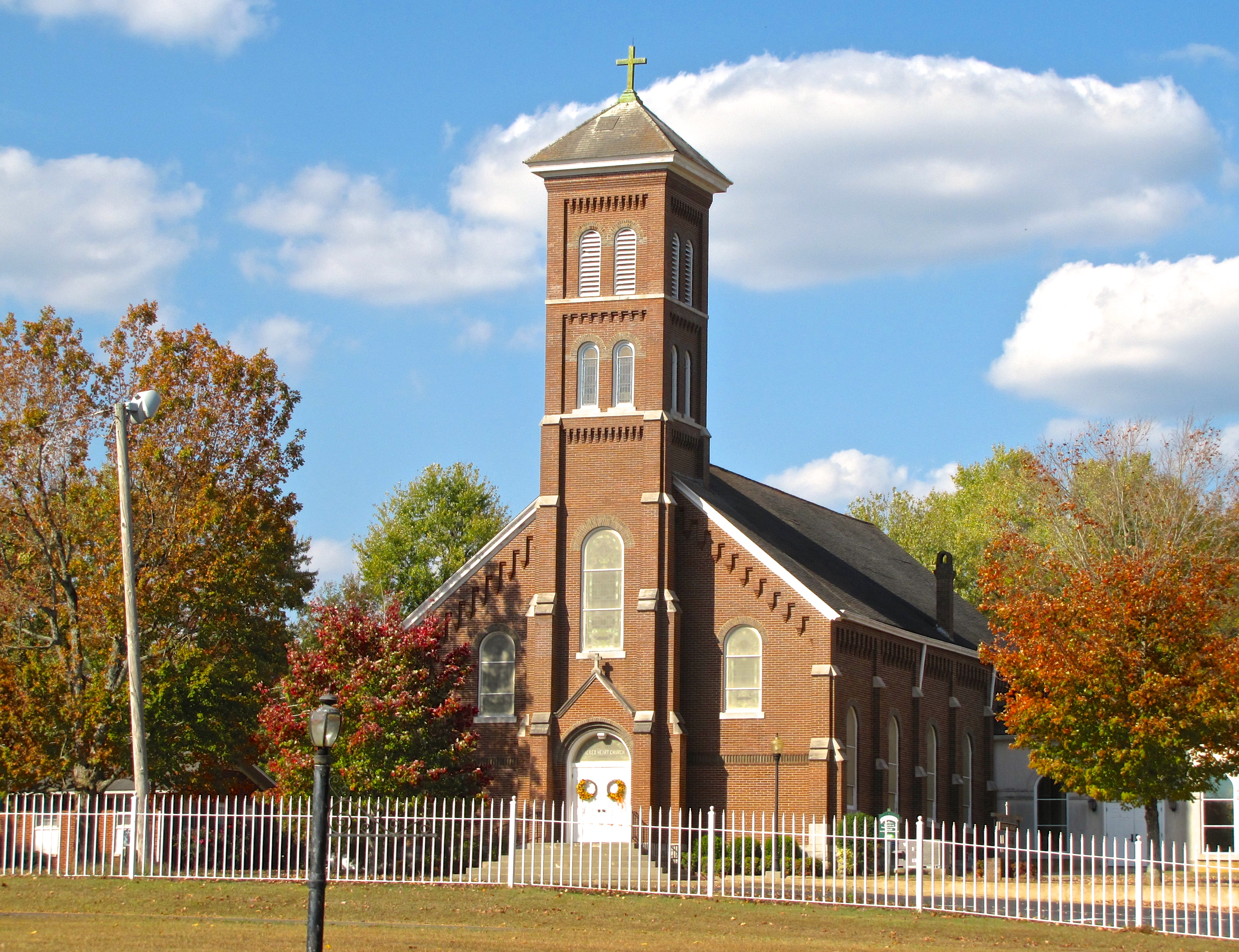

- Location within Tennessee Location within the United States
- Location: Church St., Loretto, Tennessee
- Coordinates: 35°4′36″N 87°26′36″W
- Area: 3 acres (1.2 ha)
- Built: 1911
- Architectural style: Late Gothic Revival, Romanesque
- MPS: German Catholic Churches and Cemeteries of Lawrence County TR
- NRHP reference No.: 84000094
- Added to NRHP: October 10, 1984

Sacred Heart Catholic Church is a historic Roman Catholic church on Church Street in Loretto, Tennessee.

The congregation was formed in 1871 by Catholics of German ancestry who had come from the Cincinnati area to settle in Lawrence County, Tennessee. The first priest was J. H. Hueser, who had been sent to Tennessee from Indiana in 1869 to become the first priest in Lawrence County. After working in Lawrenceburg, in 1871 he moved 14 miles (23 km) south to help establish a new settlement called Glynnrock (later named Loretto). The parish residence that he built in 1871 was used for Mass from October 1871 to February 1872, while a new frame building was being built to serve as a combined church and school. The church's current brick building replaced that first church. It was started in 1910 and dedicated in May 1912. In 1984 it was added to the National Register of Historic Places.
