= Iron City, Tennessee =

- Census-designated place
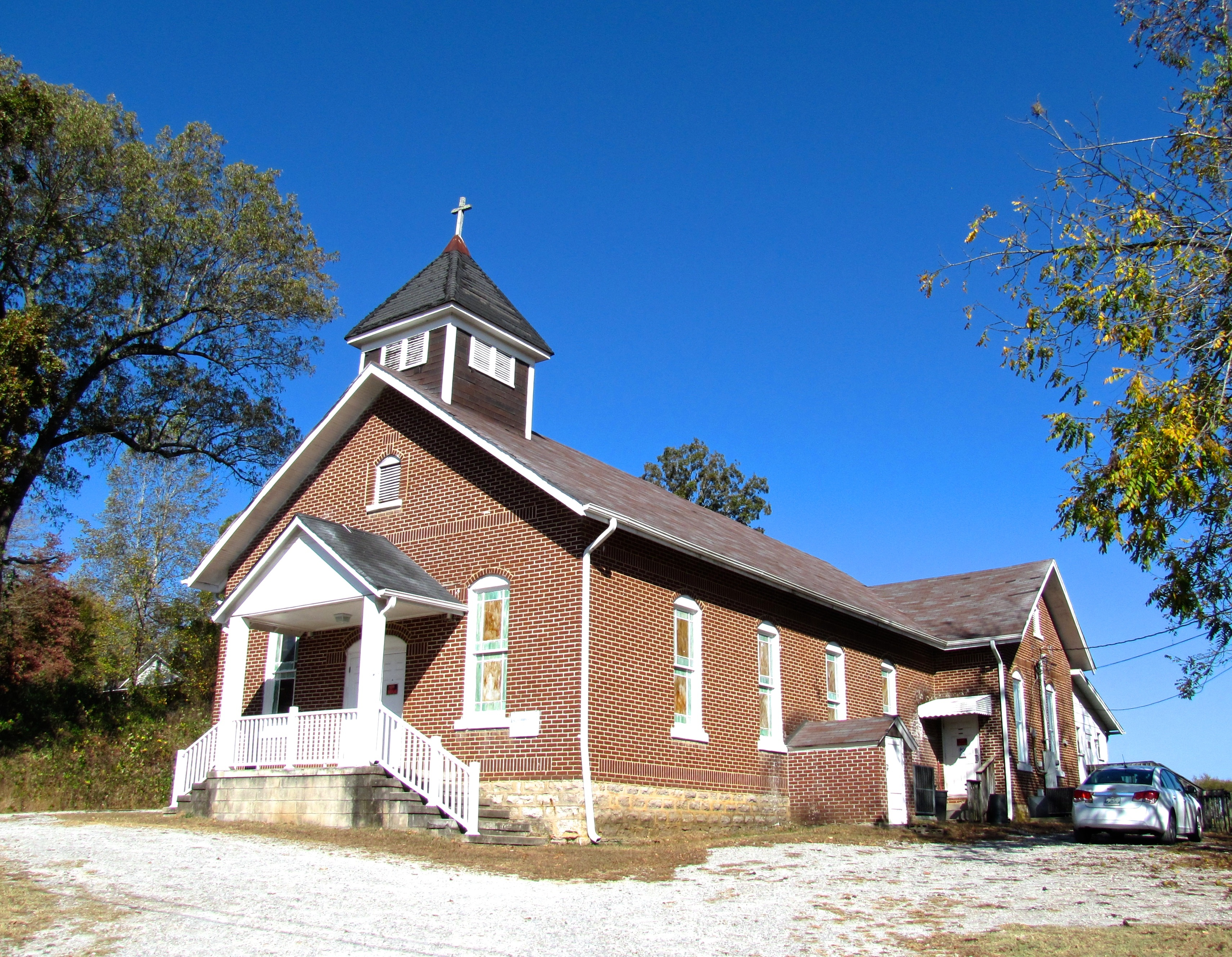
- South Lawrence Head Start in Iron City

- Location of Iron City in Lawrence County, Tennessee.

- Location within Tennessee Location within the United States
- Coordinates: 35°1′32″N 87°35′1″W
- Country: United States
- State: Tennessee
- County: Lawrence

Area
  - Total: 0.69 sq mi (1.79 km^{2})
  - Land: 0.69 sq mi (1.79 km^{2})
  - Water: 0 sq mi (0.00 km^{2})
- Elevation: 564 ft (172 m)

Population (2020)
  - Total: 274
  - Density: 396.6/sq mi (153.14/km^{2})
- Time zone: UTC-6 (Central (CST))
  - Summer (DST): UTC-5 (CDT)
- ZIP code: 38463
- Area code: 931
- FIPS code: 47-37360
- GNIS feature ID: 1289045

Iron City is a census-designated place and former city in Lawrence County, Tennessee.

Iron City was incorporated as a city from 1887 to 1901, and again from 1962 until 2010, when its residents voted to disincorporate.

The United States Census treated Iron City as a census-designated place for both the 2010 and 2020 censuses. The population was 328 in 2010 and 274 in 2020.

== History ==
Iron City gets its name from an iron foundry that operated in its vicinity in the late 19th century. While iron ore was mined in southwestern Lawrence County as early as the 1830s, the industry really began to thrive in 1886, when a branch railroad line to the area was completed. Iron City incorporated the following year.

At its founding, the community of Iron City developed on the boundary between Lawrence and Wayne Counties, with portions historically extending into both. However, the Tennessee General Assembly passed Acts of 1877, Chapter 157, which moved the county line to follow the Lawrenceburg, Wayland Springs, and Florence road. This legislative change moved all territory south and east of that road into Lawrence County, effectively placing the entirety of Iron City within Lawrence County before its official incorporation. The community has since remained in Lawrence County.

At its height, Iron City supported a population of about 1,000 and included two hotels and two banks.

== Geography ==
Iron City is situated in the Shoal Creek Valley, north of the Tennessee-Alabama state line. Iron City is surrounded by rugged hills on the north, south, and west, and by the creek on the east.

State Route 227 passes east-to-west through Iron City, connecting it to St. Joseph across the hills to the east and State Route 13 south of Collinwood to the west. State Route 242, which intersects SR 227 in Iron City, connects the community with Westpoint and Lawrenceburg to the northeast. Poplar Street/Pruitton Road connects Iron City with Lauderdale County, Alabama, to the south, becoming County Road 61 at the state line.

According to the United States Census Bureau, the CDP has a total area of 0.9 square miles (2.4 km^{2}), all land.

== Demographics ==
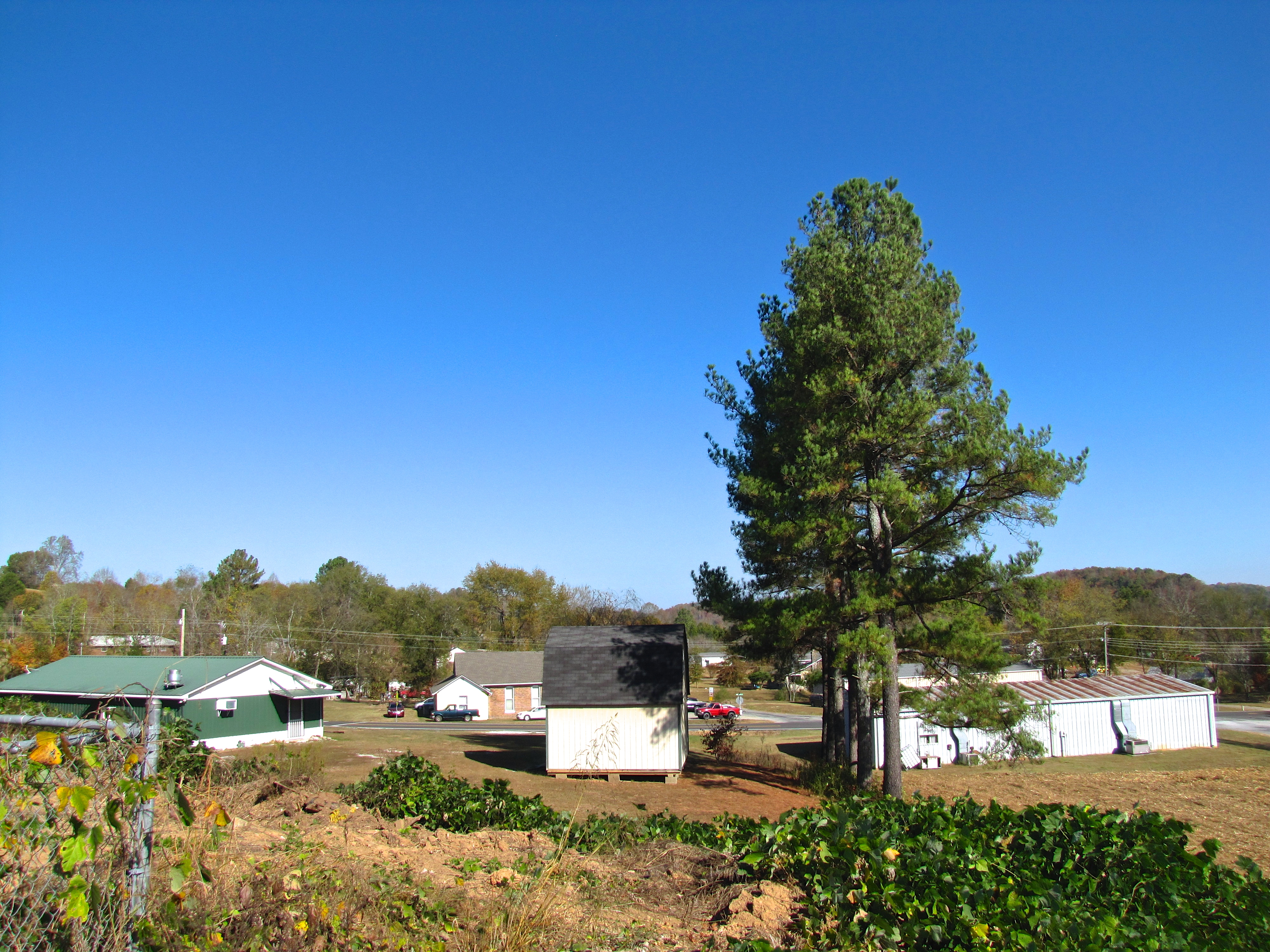
Houses in Iron City

As of the 2000 census, 368 people, 151 households, and 107 families resided in the CDP. The population density was 401.4 inhabitants per square mile (155.0/km^{2}). The 159 housing units had an average density of 173.5 per square mile (67.0/km^{2}). The racial makeup of the city was 97.28% White, 2.17% African American, 0.27% from other races, and 0.27% from two or more races. Hispanics or Latino of any race were 1.09% of the population.

Of the 151 households, 31.8% had children under 18 living with them, 45.7% were married couples living together, 17.9% had a female householder with no husband present, and 29.1% were not families. AAbout 27.2% of all households were made up of individuals, and 13.2% had someone living alone who was 65 or older. The average household size was 2.44 and the average family size was 2.89.

In the CDP, the age distribution was 24.7% under 18, 7.3% from 18 to 24, 32.3% from 25 to 44, 23.6% from 45 to 64, and 12.0% who were 65 or older. The median age was 36 years. For every 100 females, there were 90.7 males. For every 100 females 18 and over, there were 82.2 males.

The median income for a household in the CDP was $20,625, and for a family was $28,889. Males had a median income of $20,729 versus $15,500 for females. The per capita income for the city was $17,185. About 15.1% of families and 23.0% of the population were below the poverty line, including 30.1% of those under 18 and 22.6% of those 65 or over.

In 2020, the population was 274.

== Government ==
As of August 1, 1987, the town no longer had police officers of its own; law enforcement services defaulted to the county sheriff.

== Notable people ==
Iron City is the hometown of 1960s country music star Melba Montgomery.

== In popular culture ==
In 2008, the film, Iron City Blues was released. The film is about a biker/bluesman who travels to Iron City to write a song about the town's history.
