= Garrett House (Lawrenceburg, Tennessee) =

- U.S. National Register of Historic Places
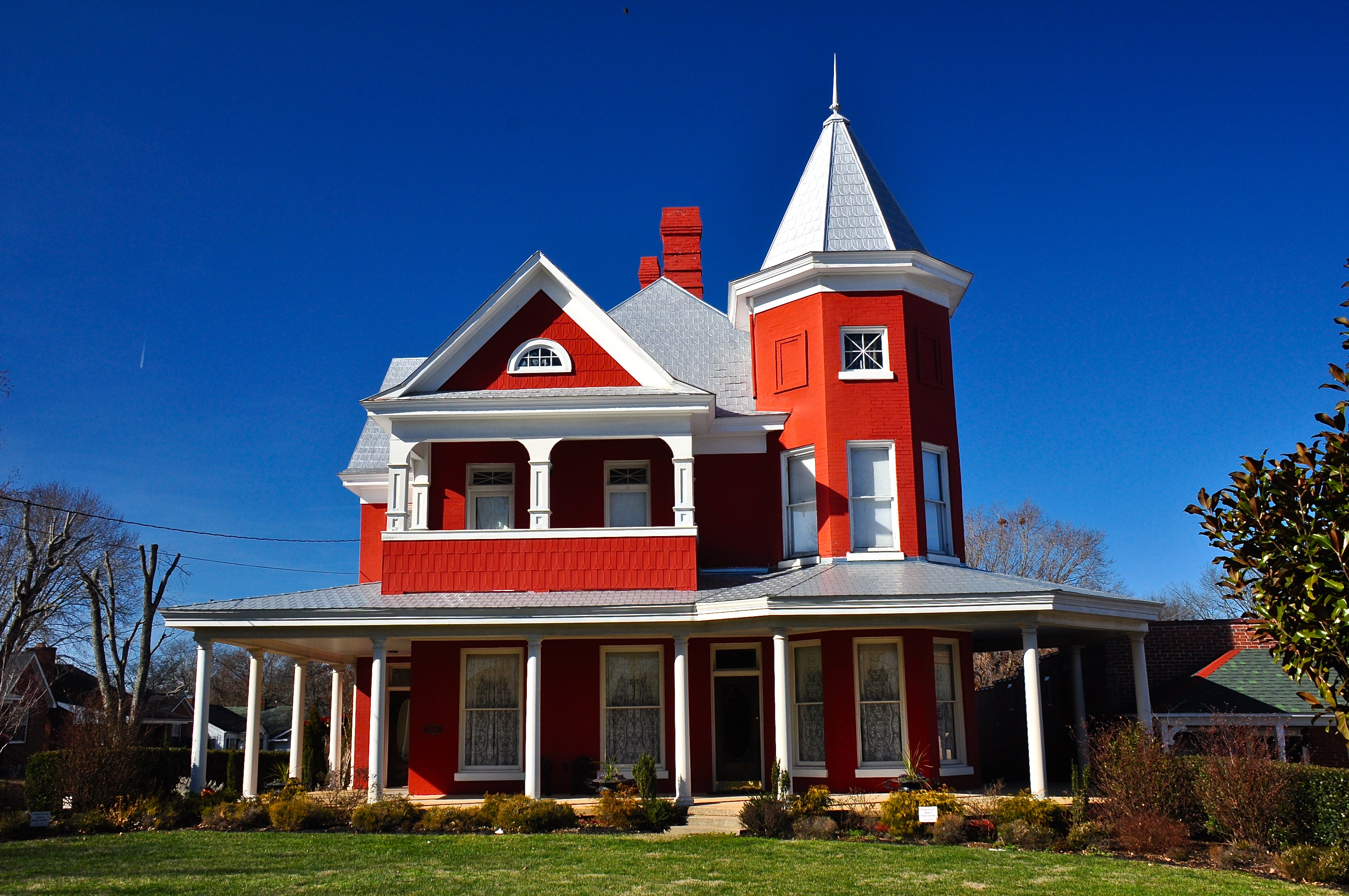

- Location within Tennessee Location within the United States
- Location: 205 South Military Avenue, Lawrenceburg, Tennessee
- Coordinates: 35°14′29″N 87°20′09″W
- Area: less than one acre
- Architectural style: Queen Anne
- NRHP reference No.: 09000137
- Added to NRHP: March 17, 2009

The Garrett House is a historic house in Lawrenceburg, Tennessee, U.S.. It was built in 1908 for James W. Garrett, who served as the mayor of Lawrenceburg in 1911 and 1913. It was owned by his daughter, Flora Garrett Cottingham, from 1929 to 1939, when it was purchased by Dr. W.M. Gallaher.

The house was designed in the Queen Anne architectural style. It has been listed on the National Register of Historic Places since March 17, 2009.
