= St. Joseph Church (St. Joseph, Tennessee) =

Historic church in Tennessee, United States

- U.S. National Register of Historic Places
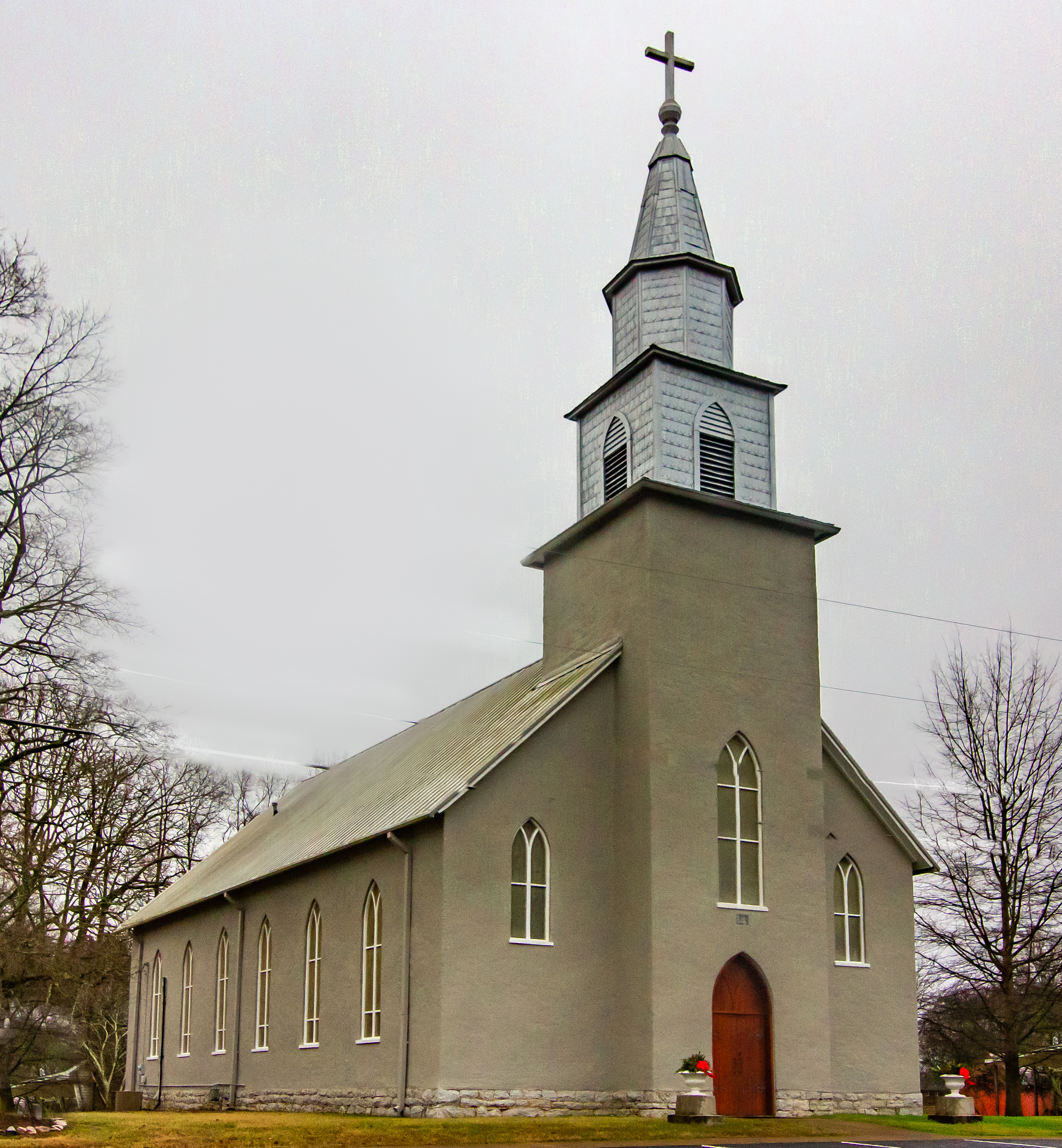

- Location within Tennessee Location within the United States
- Location: 304 American Blvd. St. Joseph, Tennessee
- Coordinates: 35°1′59″N 87°30′11″W
- Area: 4.3 acres (1.7 ha)
- Built: 1885
- MPS: German Catholic Churches and Cemeteries of Lawrence County TR
- NRHP reference No.: 84000113
- Added to NRHP: October 10, 1984

St. Joseph Church is a historic Roman Catholic church at 304 American Blvd. in St. Joseph, Tennessee.

The Roman Catholic church in St. Joseph was established in 1872. Its first church building was a small frame structure located near the current church. It housed a parochial school for many years and was being used for storage as of 1984.

The current church building is a large structure built in 1885 by the church's parishioners from ashlar cut stone that they had quarried at a nearby site. It has a stucco exterior and a square bell tower with a short octagonal steeple that is roofed with tin shingles. It has an unusually elaborate interior that is largely the work of John Sliemers, who served as the local parish priest from 1901 to 1903 and from 1914 to 1934. Both the main altar and side altars have elaborate carvings, while lathe-turned balusters support the chancel rail and the rear gallery. Religious scenes are depicted in stained-glass windows and in paintings on the interior walls.

The 1885 church building was added to the National Register of Historic Places in 1984.
