= Alexander Springs, Tennessee =

Unincorporated community in Tennessee, US

Coordinates: 35°22′38″N 87°16′09″W

Alexander Springs is an unincorporated community in Lawrence County, Tennessee, in the United States.

Alexander Springs was named for Absalom Alexander, the original owner of the town site.
