= Garner Mill =

United States historic place (1820–1998)

- Formerly listed on the U.S. National Register of Historic Places
- Location: Garner Lane, Lawrenceburg, Tennessee
- Built: 1820
- NRHP reference No.: 84003575

Significant dates
- Added to NRHP: July 12, 1984
- Removed from NRHP: November 19, 2008

The Garner Mill was a historic grist mill and saw mill on Shoal Creek in Lawrenceburg, Tennessee.

The original mill was built in 1820 by James Scott, after the county court gave him permission to establish a mill on Shoal Creek. It had many owners through its history. C. H. Nicholson, who acquired it in 1851, operated it as both a water-powered sawmill and a grist mill. The mill was listed on the National Register of Historic Places in 1984.

Both the mill and the associated dam were destroyed by a major flood on Shoal Creek in July 1998. The property was removed from the National Register in November 2008.
