= Sacred Heart of Jesus Church (Lawrenceburg, Tennessee) =

Historic church in Tennessee, United States

- U.S. National Register of Historic Places
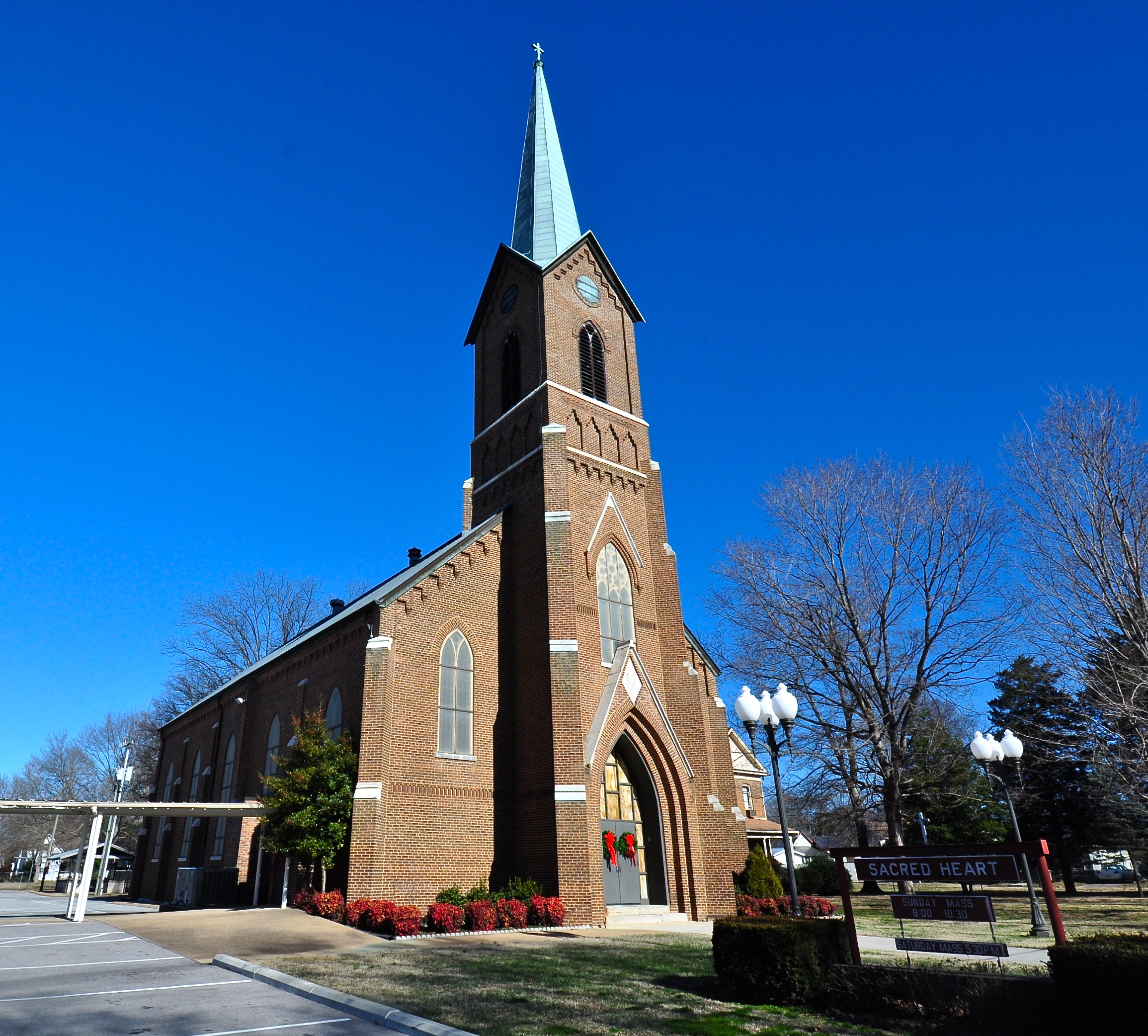
- Sacred Heart of Jesus Church, January 2015.

- Location within Tennessee Location within the United States
- Location: Berger St., Lawrenceburg, Tennessee
- Coordinates: 35°14′46″N 87°20′7″W
- Area: 3 acres (1.2 ha)
- Built: 1887
- Architectural style: Late Victorian
- MPS: German Catholic Churches and Cemeteries of Lawrence County TR
- NRHP reference No.: 84000093
- Added to NRHP: October 10, 1984

The Sacred Heart of Jesus Church is a historic Roman Catholic church on Berger Street in Lawrenceburg, Tennessee.

The church was founded in 1869-70 for German Catholics settling in the Lawrenceburg area. The land for the church was purchased by the Cincinnati Homestead Society. Father Henry Hueser was the first priest; initially services were held in his house. The first church building was a frame building completed in 1872. The church's present brick building was completed in 1887, at which time the earlier frame church was converted into a school. A new two-story school building was constructed in 1912, and stood for fifty years until it was replaced with a newer structure. A gymnasium was added to the school in 1990.

The church was added to the National Register of Historic Places in 1984.
