= Lawrence County, Tennessee =

County in Tennessee, United States

- County
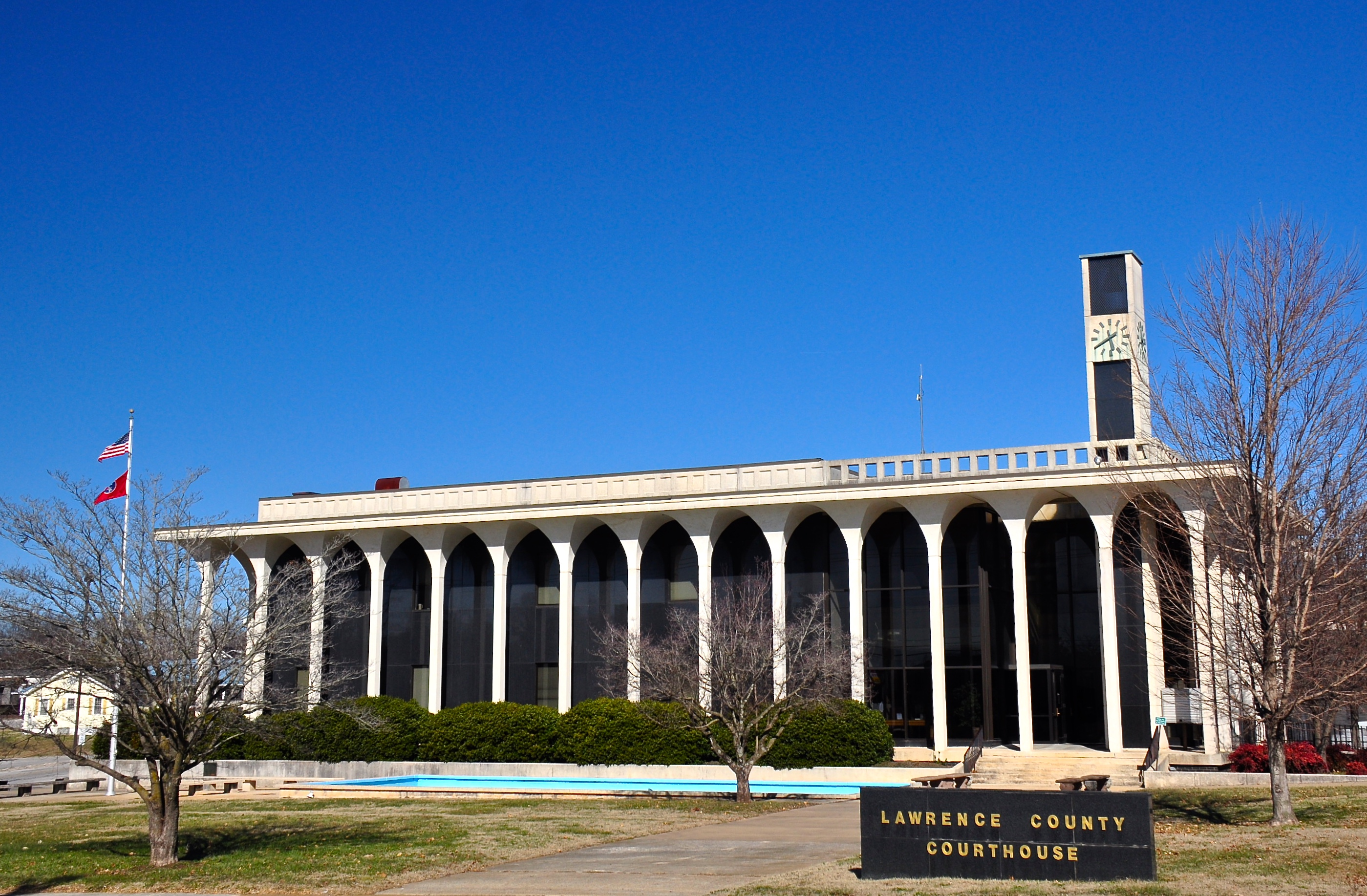
- Lawrence County Courthouse, January 2015

- Seal

- Location within the U.S. state of Tennessee
- Coordinates: 35°13′N 87°23′W
- Country: United States
- State: Tennessee
- Founded: 1817
- Named for: James Lawrence
- Seat: Lawrenceburg
- Largest city: Lawrenceburg

Area
  - Total: 618 sq mi (1,600 km^{2})
  - Land: 617 sq mi (1,600 km^{2})
  - Water: 0.9 sq mi (2.3 km^{2}) 0.1%

Population (2020)
  - Total: 44,159
  - Estimate (2025): 46,914 ▲
  - Density: 75.3/sq mi (29.1/km^{2})
- Time zone: UTC−6 (Central)
  - Summer (DST): UTC−5 (CDT)
- Congressional district: 4th
- Website: www.lawrencecountytn.gov

Lawrence County is a county located in the U.S. state of Tennessee, in the southwestern part of Middle Tennessee. As of the 2020 census, the population was 44,159. Its county seat and largest city is Lawrenceburg. Lawrence County comprises the Lawrenceburg, TN Micropolitan Statistical Area, which is also included in the Nashville-Davidson–Murfreesboro, TN Combined Statistical Area.

== History ==
Created by an act of the Tennessee General Assembly on October 21, 1817, Lawrence County was formed from lands previously part of Hickman and Giles counties.

It was named in honor of Captain James Lawrence (1781–1813), who while commanding the USS Chesapeake in an 1813 battle with the Royal Navy frigate HMS Shannon, issued his famous command: "Don't give up the ship! Blow her up." His men did anyway and Lawrence died of wounds.

Lawrenceburg was chosen as the county seat in 1819 as it was near the center of the county and because Jackson's Military Road ran just east of the town. In April 1821, the road was redirected through the center of the Lawrenceburg. The military road, the main route from New Orleans, Louisiana, to Nashville, Tennessee, played a significant role in the county's development.

An early resident was David Crockett, who served as one of the county's first commissioners and justices of the peace. Crockett lived in the county for several years and ran a water-powered grist mill, powder mill and distillery on Shoal Creek, (originally called the Sycamore River) where David Crockett State Park is now located.

In the early 1870s, many German Catholics moved into the area, including skilled tradesmen. After the arrival of the railroad in 1883, the county became a major source of iron ore.

Between 1908 and 1915, there was an influx of settlers from Alabama. Most were cotton growers or worked in the timber industry. Logging soon declined, since the forests were not replanted after trees were harvested; however, cotton continued to be a major crop until the 1960s.

In 1944, Amish people moved to the area and established a community in the north of the county. The Old Order Amish community has now become a tourist attraction.

The county has been struck by two killer tornadoes. On May 18, 1995 a F4 tornado struck the county. On April 16, 1998, an F5 tornado hit the county, part of the 1998 Nashville tornado outbreak.

In June 2010, the Tennessee Commission of Indian Affairs gave official recognition to six Native American groups, including the Central Band of Cherokee, also known as the Cherokee of Lawrence County. The recognition of these tribes at a state level has stirred much controversy among federally recognized Indian tribes, who claim the recognition by a state is unconstitutional and threatens the status of existing tribes.

In July 2017, the Hope Botanical Garden was formed in the Leoma community.

== Geography ==
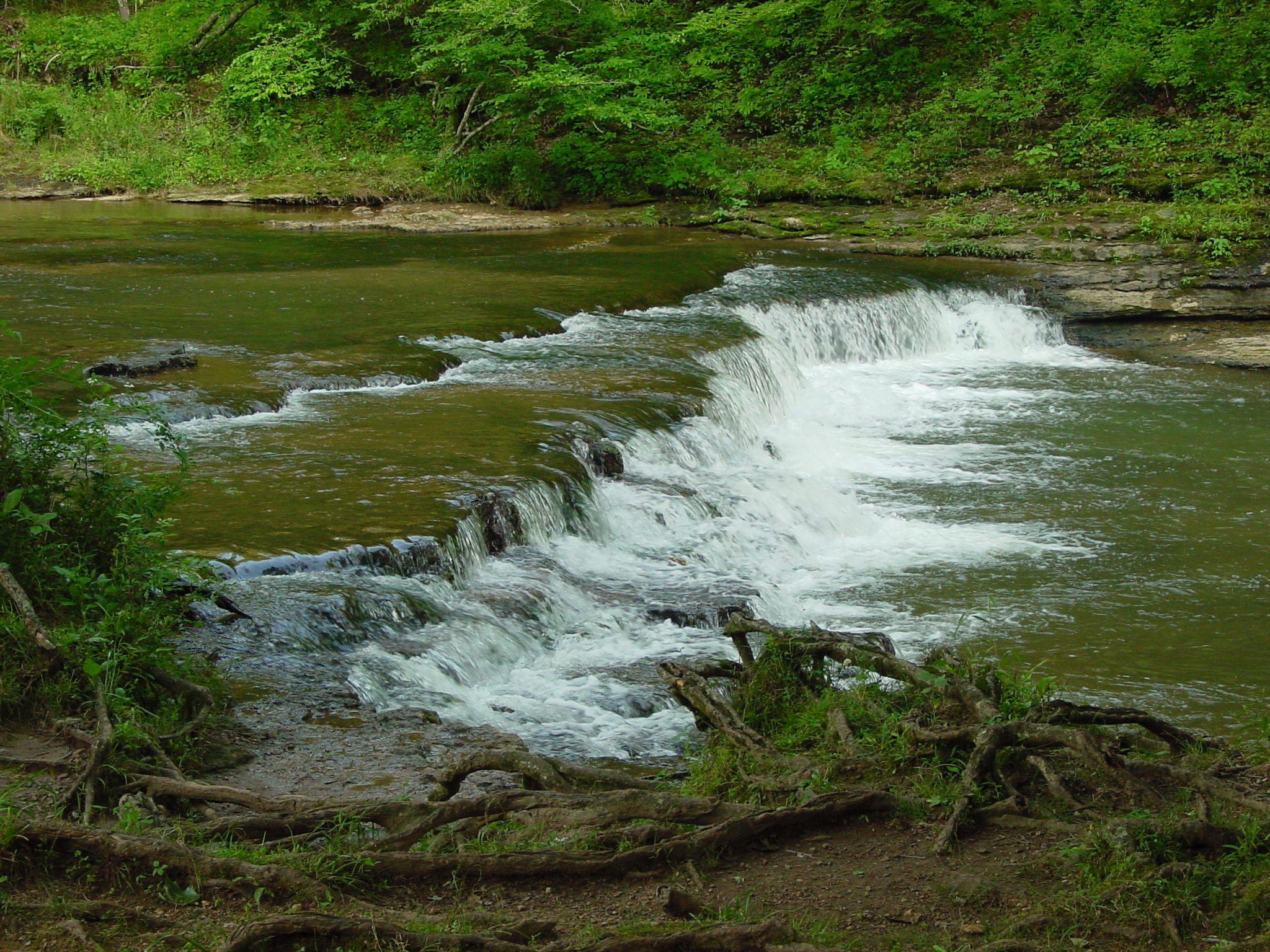
Crockett Falls at David Crockett State Park

According to the U.S. Census Bureau, the county has a total area of 618 square miles (1,600 km^{2}), of which 617 square miles (1,600 km^{2}) is land and 0.9 square miles (2.3 km^{2}) (0.1%) is water.

=== Major highways ===
- U.S. Route 43
- U.S. Route 64
- Tennessee State Route 20
- Tennessee State Route 98
- Tennessee State Route 227
- Tennessee State Route 240
- Tennessee State Route 241
- Tennessee State Route 242
- Natchez Trace Parkway

=== Rail ===
- Tennessee Southern Railroad

=== Air ===
- Lawrenceburg–Lawrence County Airport

=== Adjacent counties ===
- Lewis County (north)
- Maury County (northeast)
- Giles County (east)
- Lauderdale County, Alabama (south)
- Wayne County (west)

=== National protected area ===
- Natchez Trace Parkway (part)

=== State protected areas ===
- David Crockett State Park
- Laurel Hill Wildlife Management Area

== Demographics ==
Historical population
Census	Pop.	Note	%±
1820	3,271		—
1830	5,411		65.4%
1840	7,121		31.6%
1850	9,280		30.3%
1860	9,320		0.4%
1870	7,601		−18.4%
1880	10,383		36.6%
1890	12,286		18.3%
1900	15,402		25.4%
1910	17,569		14.1%
1920	23,593		34.3%
1930	26,776		13.5%
1940	28,726		7.3%
1950	28,818		0.3%
1960	28,049		−2.7%
1970	29,097		3.7%
1980	34,110		17.2%
1990	35,303		3.5%
2000	39,926		13.1%
2010	41,869		4.9%
2020	44,159		5.5%
2025 (est.)	46,914	▲	6.2%
U.S. Decennial Census; 1790-1960 1900-1990; 1990-2000 2010-2015 2020 2024

=== 2020 census ===
Lawrence County racial composition
Race	Number	Percentage
White (non-Hispanic)	40,368	91.42%
Black or African American (non-Hispanic)	694	1.57%
Native American	92	0.21%
Asian	167	0.38%
Pacific Islander	1	0.0%
Other/Mixed	1,720	3.9%
Hispanic or Latino	1,117	2.53%

As of the 2020 census, there were 44,159 people, 17,075 households, and 11,028 families residing in the county.

The median age was 40.1 years. 24.5% of residents were under the age of 18 and 18.6% of residents were 65 years of age or older. For every 100 females there were 95.2 males, and for every 100 females age 18 and over there were 92.8 males age 18 and over.

The racial makeup of the county was 92.2% White, 1.6% Black or African American, 0.2% American Indian and Alaska Native, 0.4% Asian, <0.1% Native Hawaiian and Pacific Islander, 1.1% from some other race, and 4.5% from two or more races. Hispanic or Latino residents of any race comprised 2.5% of the population.

26.4% of residents lived in urban areas, while 73.6% lived in rural areas.

There were 17,075 households in the county, of which 31.6% had children under the age of 18 living in them. Of all households, 51.2% were married-couple households, 16.7% were households with a male householder and no spouse or partner present, and 26.1% were households with a female householder and no spouse or partner present. About 27.3% of all households were made up of individuals and 13.5% had someone living alone who was 65 years of age or older.

There were 18,658 housing units, of which 8.5% were vacant. Among occupied housing units, 73.4% were owner-occupied and 26.6% were renter-occupied. The homeowner vacancy rate was 1.4% and the rental vacancy rate was 6.1%.

=== 2000 census ===
As of the census of 2000, there were 39,926 people, 15,480 households, and 11,362 families residing in the county. The population density was 65 people per square mile (25 people/km^{2}). There were 16,821 housing units but as of 2010 that had jumped to over 19,000 at an average density of 27 per square mile (10/km^{2}). The racial makeup of the county was 96.83% White, 1.47% Black or African American, 0.32% Native American, 0.24% Asian, 0.02% Pacific Islander, 0.39% from other races, and 0.73% from two or more races. 1.00% of the population were Hispanic or Latino of any race.

There were 15,480 households, out of which 33.70% had children under the age of 18 living with them, 59.10% were married couples living together, 10.60% had a female householder with no husband present, and 26.60% were non-families. 23.70% of all households were made up of individuals, and 11.40% had someone living alone who was 65 years of age or older. The average household size was 2.56 and the average family size was 3.02.

In the county, the population was spread out, with 26.20% under the age of 18, 8.40% from 18 to 24, 28.10% from 25 to 44, 23.00% from 45 to 64, and 14.40% who were 65 years of age or older. The median age was 36 years. For every 100 females there were 94.30 males. For every 100 females age 18 and over, there were 90.20 males.

The median income for a household in the county was $30,498, and the median income for a family was $35,326. Males had a median income of $27,742 versus $20,928 for females. The per capita income for the county was $15,848. About 10.70% of families and 14.60% of the population were below the poverty line, including 19.20% of those under age 18 and 16.30% of those age 65 or over.

== Government ==
Lawrence County's chief executive officer is the County Executive. Along with the County Executive, the county has a total of 18 county commissioners which control the county's finances. Every fiscal year the Board must adopt a budget which appropriates funds to the many departments and agencies of the Lawrence County Government; and, at the same time, provides sufficient revenue to meet these appropriations.

The Board of County Commissioners serves as the legislative and policy setting body of Lawrence County. As such, the Board enacts all legislation and authorizes programs and expenditures within Lawrence County.

For the term starting in 2014, the officials for Lawrence County are:

- County Executive T.R. Williams (chairman)
- District 1 Wayne Yocom
- District 2 Chris D. Jackson (Chairman Pro-Tempore)
- District 3 Denny Gillespie
- District 4 Brandon Brown
- District 5 Phil Hood
- District 6 Bobby Clifton
- District 7 Aaron Story
- District 8 Mark Niedergeses
- District 9 Ronnie Benefield
- District 10 Delano Benefield
- District 11 Scott Franks
- District 12 Jim Modlin
- District 13 Alanna Harris
- District 14 Nathan Keeton
- District 15 Tammy Wisdom
- District 16 Shane Eaton
- District 17 Bert Spearman
- District 18 Russ Brewer

== Politics ==
In Tennessee, a state defined for nearly a century after the civil war by Republican landslides in the east of the state balanced out by Democratic landslides in the middle and west of the state, Lawrence County was a rare swing county. Lawrence only voted for two losers between 1904 and 2004, Charles Evans Hughes in 1916 and Richard Nixon in 1960. Since 2008, the county has rapidly become overwhelmingly Republican, as has most of Tennessee.

United States presidential election results for Lawrence County, Tennessee
Year	Republican		Democratic		Third party(ies)	
Year	No.	%	No.	%	No.	%
1896	1,203	46.52%	1,376	53.21%	7	0.27%
1900	1,327	47.26%	1,481	52.74%	0	0.00%
1904	1,359	51.13%	1,299	48.87%	0	0.00%
1908	1,726	51.82%	1,591	47.76%	14	0.42%
1912	878	27.29%	1,504	46.75%	835	25.96%
1916	1,837	50.55%	1,787	49.17%	10	0.28%
1920	3,843	59.55%	2,610	40.45%	0	0.00%
1924	2,375	51.45%	2,185	47.34%	56	1.21%
1928	3,581	56.23%	2,779	43.63%	9	0.14%
1932	1,684	34.03%	3,240	65.48%	24	0.49%
1936	3,342	40.94%	4,773	58.46%	49	0.60%
1940	1,877	32.16%	3,936	67.44%	23	0.39%
1944	4,359	48.32%	4,662	51.68%	0	0.00%
1948	3,837	42.24%	4,854	53.43%	393	4.33%
1952	4,561	51.07%	4,299	48.14%	71	0.79%
1956	4,588	51.67%	4,227	47.60%	65	0.73%
1960	5,709	53.66%	4,862	45.70%	68	0.64%
1964	4,590	45.72%	5,449	54.28%	0	0.00%
1968	4,343	41.26%	2,191	20.81%	3,993	37.93%
1972	6,438	67.90%	2,824	29.78%	220	2.32%
1976	4,967	40.75%	7,140	58.57%	83	0.68%
1980	6,532	48.47%	6,082	45.13%	863	6.40%
1984	6,034	52.18%	5,458	47.20%	71	0.61%
1988	6,273	56.09%	4,903	43.84%	7	0.06%
1992	5,608	40.45%	6,816	49.16%	1,440	10.39%
1996	6,115	45.77%	6,188	46.32%	1,056	7.90%
2000	7,613	52.61%	6,643	45.91%	214	1.48%
2004	9,959	59.79%	6,592	39.57%	107	0.64%
2008	10,566	65.96%	5,161	32.22%	293	1.83%
2012	10,770	70.77%	4,237	27.84%	212	1.39%
2016	12,420	79.28%	2,821	18.01%	425	2.71%
2020	15,334	81.92%	3,195	17.07%	189	1.01%
2024	16,429	84.11%	2,939	15.05%	165	0.84%

== Communities ==
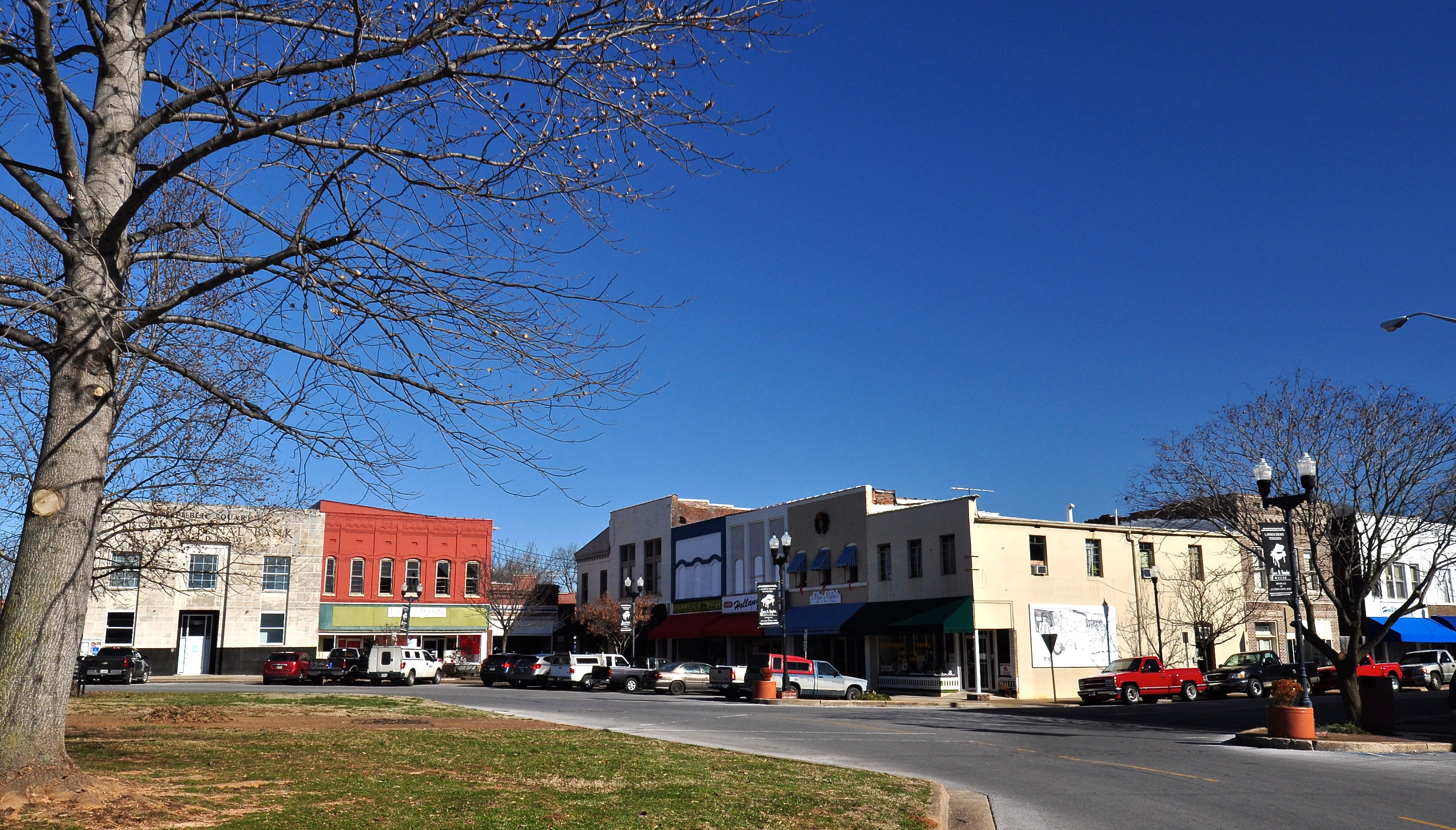
Lawrenceburg

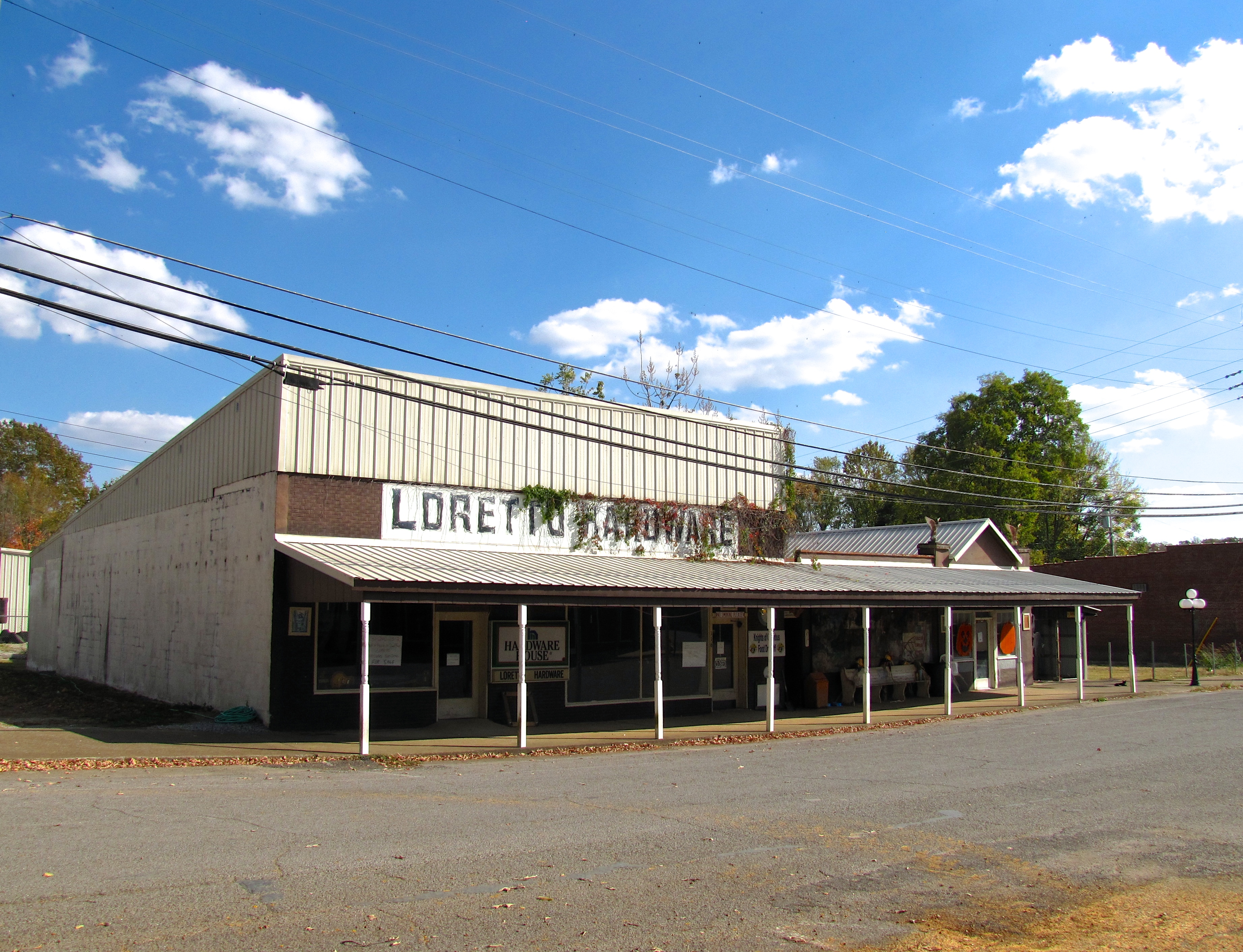
Loretto

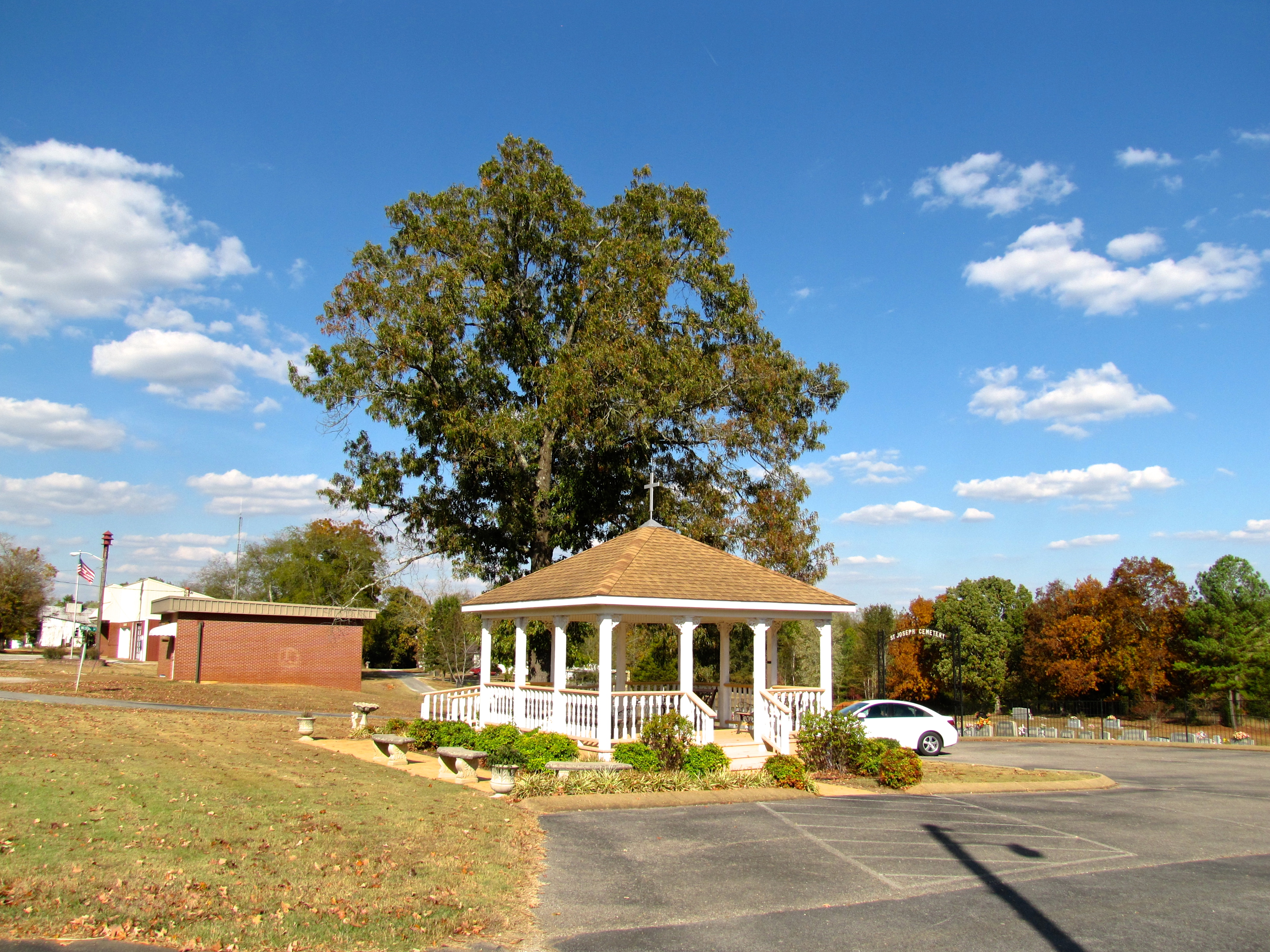
St. Joseph

=== Cities ===
- Lawrenceburg (county seat)
- Loretto
- St. Joseph

=== Town ===
- Ethridge

=== Census-designated places ===
- Iron City
- Leoma
- Summertown
- Westpoint

=== Unincorporated communities ===
- Alexander Springs
- Appleton
- Carpenter's Station
- Five Points
- Henryville
- Liberty Grove
- Spring Creek

== Notable people ==
- Michael Jeter, actor
- Fred Thompson, former U.S. Senator
- David Weathers, Major League Baseball player
- John Paul White, musician
- Ryan Weathers, Major League Baseball player

== See also ==
- National Register of Historic Places listings in Lawrence County, Tennessee
