= Loretto, Tennessee =

- City
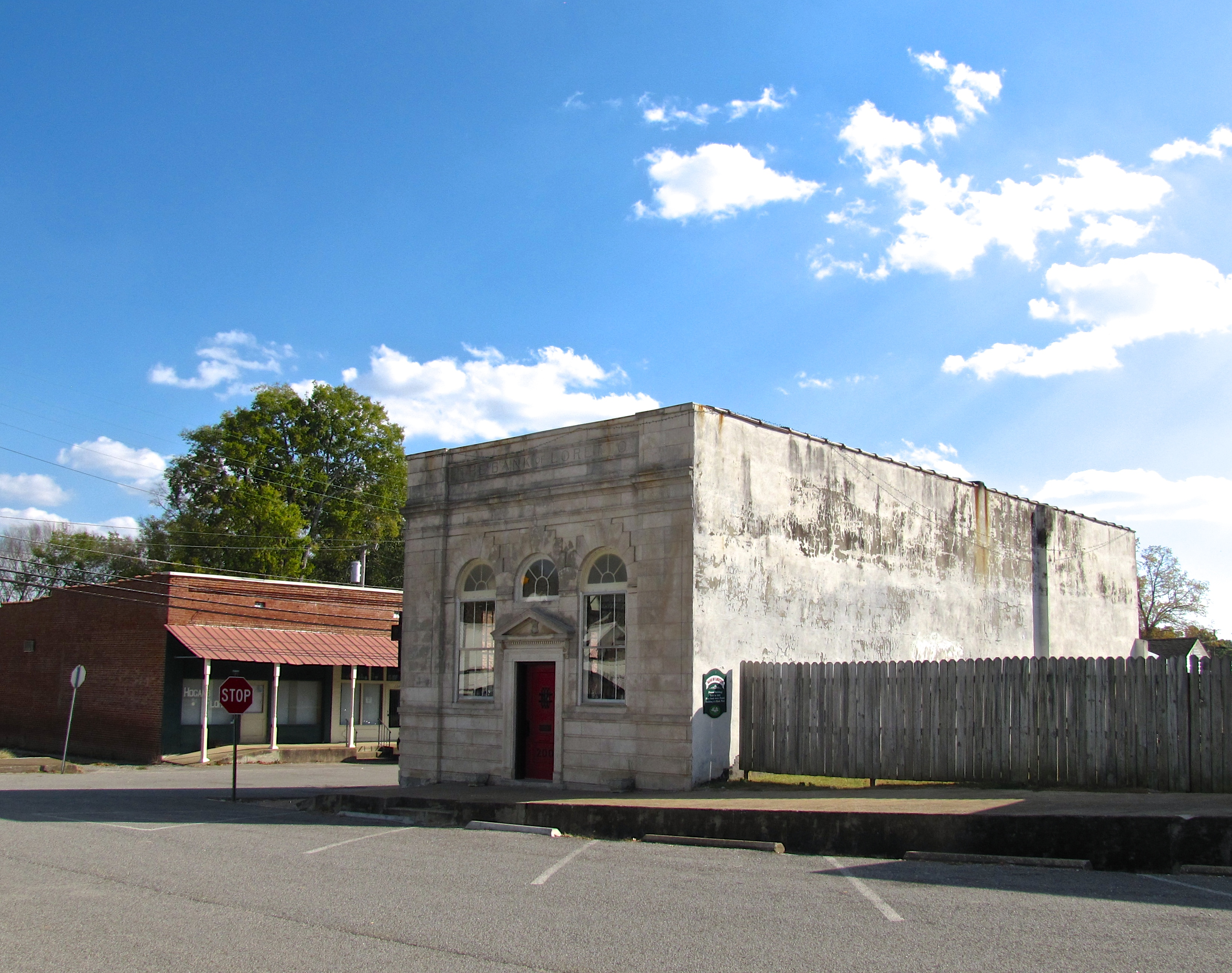
- Bank of Loretto building

- Location of Loretto in Lawrence County, Tennessee.
- Coordinates: 35°4′42″N 87°26′20″W
- Country: United States
- State: Tennessee
- County: Lawrence

Area
  - Total: 3.79 sq mi (9.81 km^{2})
  - Land: 3.78 sq mi (9.80 km^{2})
  - Water: 0.0077 sq mi (0.02 km^{2})
- Elevation: 823 ft (251 m)

Population (2020)
  - Total: 1,739
  - Density: 459.7/sq mi (177.51/km^{2})
- Time zone: UTC-6 (Central (CST))
  - Summer (DST): UTC-5 (CDT)
- ZIP code: 38469
- Area code: 931
- FIPS code: 47-43700
- GNIS feature ID: 1292062
- Website: cityoflorettotn.gov

Loretto is a city in Lawrence County, Tennessee, United States. The population was 1,714 at the 2010 census, and 1,739 at the 2020 census.

== History ==
Loretto began as a stagecoach station known as "Glen Rock" in the early 19th century. In 1870, a number of German Catholic immigrants settled in the Loretto area, and a new city was established shortly afterward. Some sources suggest the name "Loretto" was inspired by the Loreto region in Italy, while others say the city was named for a sainted nun. The congregation the immigrants formed, the Sacred Heart Church of Jesus, still exists, and their church (built in 1912) is listed on the National Register of Historic Places. With the arrival of the railroad in the 1880s, Loretto thrived as a lumber town.

Other historic buildings include the Bank of Loretto building, which was built in the 1920s. The Bank of Loretto building was renovated in 2013. Next door to the old Loretto bank building was Weathers Store and Myers Store. They sold general merchandise to generations of families. Steps down the street lies the Loretto Milling Company, established in 1895 and still open for business, making it one of the oldest family-run businesses in the city. Other businesses located in this district included a doctor's office, cobbler's shop, cafes, hotels, and a funeral home. There was also a stage coach stop, and then later on a bus depot. The historic downtown area began to decline following the construction of U.S. Route 43 to the east of the district in the 1940s, when its commercial activity shifted to the new highway. Like many Southern towns, Loretto is applying for grants to help revive the older historic district.

Loretto is the home of the Loretto High School Mustangs.

== Geography ==
Loretto is situated on a relatively broad ridgetop between the Shoal Creek Valley to the west and Bluewater Creek to the east. U.S. Route 43 connects Loretto with Lawrenceburg to the northeast and the Muscle Shoals area in Alabama to the southwest. Tennessee State Route 227 connects Loretto with rural Lawrence County and Lexington, Alabama, to the southeast (the road becomes Alabama State Route 101 at the state line).

According to the United States Census Bureau, the city has a total area of 3.8 square miles (9.8 km^{2}), of which 3.8 square miles (9.8 km^{2}) is land and 0.27% is water.

== Demographics ==
Historical population
Census	Pop.	Note	%±
1950	706		—
1960	929		31.6%
1970	1,375		48.0%
1980	1,612		17.2%
1990	1,515		−6.0%
2000	1,665		9.9%
2010	1,714		2.9%
2020	1,739		1.5%

=== 2020 census ===
As of the 2020 census, Loretto had a population of 1,739 and 455 families residing in the city. The median age was 44.0 years, with 20.6% of residents under the age of 18 and 23.7% of residents 65 years of age or older. For every 100 females there were 95.8 males, and for every 100 females age 18 and over there were 90.1 males age 18 and over.

0.0% of residents lived in urban areas, while 100.0% lived in rural areas.

There were 735 households in Loretto, of which 27.3% had children under the age of 18 living in them. Of all households, 49.1% were married-couple households, 16.7% were households with a male householder and no spouse or partner present, and 29.7% were households with a female householder and no spouse or partner present. About 32.8% of all households were made up of individuals and 20.1% had someone living alone who was 65 years of age or older.

There were 798 housing units, of which 7.9% were vacant. The homeowner vacancy rate was 2.1% and the rental vacancy rate was 5.2%.

Racial composition as of the 2020 census
Race	Number	Percent
White	1,649	94.8%
Black or African American	5	0.3%
American Indian and Alaska Native	3	0.2%
Asian	4	0.2%
Native Hawaiian and Other Pacific Islander	0	0.0%
Some other race	27	1.6%
Two or more races	51	2.9%
Hispanic or Latino (of any race)	33	1.9%

=== 2000 census ===
As of the census of 2000, there was a population of 1,665, with 681 households and 486 families residing in the city. The population density was 442.3 inhabitants per square mile (170.8/km^{2}). There were 735 housing units at an average density of 195.3 per square mile (75.4/km^{2}). The racial makeup of the city was 98.14% White, 0.60% African American, 0.30% Native American, 0.18% Asian, 0.24% from other races, and 0.54% from two or more races. Hispanic or Latino of any race were 1.02% of the population.

There were 681 households, out of which 29.5% had children under the age of 18 living with them, 58.3% were married couples living together, 10.4% had a female householder with no husband present, and 28.5% were non-families. 24.8% of all households were made up of individuals, and 13.8% had someone living alone who was 65 years of age or older. The average household size was 2.44 and the average family size was 2.91.

In the city, the population was spread out, with 23.5% under the age of 18, 8.8% from 18 to 24, 25.5% from 25 to 44, 24.0% from 45 to 64, and 18.1% who were 65 years of age or older. The median age was 40 years. For every 100 females, there were 89.6 males. For every 100 females age 18 and over, there were 86.3 males.

The median income for a household in the city was $31,528, and the median income for a family was $35,952. Males had a median income of $29,940 versus $21,250 for females. The per capita income for the city was $18,195. About 9.5% of families and 13.6% of the population were below the poverty line, including 16.6% of those under age 18 and 18.7% of those age 65 or over.

== Notable people ==
- Grace & Tony, country music artists
- Robert Hitchcock Spain, Methodist bishop
- Blade Tidwell, Major League Baseball pitcher
- David Weathers, Major League Baseball pitcher
- Ryan Weathers, Major League Baseball pitcher
- John Paul White, member of The Civil Wars Americana (music) duo
