= Tennessee State Route 253 =

State highway in Tennessee, United States

State Route 253
- Concord Road
- SR 253 highlighted in red

Route information
- Maintained by TDOT
- Length: 7.3 mi (11.7 km)
- Existed: July 1, 1983–present

Major junctions
- West end: US 31 in Brentwood
- I-65 Exit 71 in Brentwood
- East end: US 31A / US 41A in Nashville

Location
- Country: United States
- State: Tennessee
- Counties: Williamson, Davidson

Highway system
- Tennessee State Routes; Interstate; US; State
| ← SR 252 | → SR 254 |

State Route 253 (SR 253), also known as Concord Road, is a west–east road located in Middle Tennessee. It is a secondary route that starts from Brentwood, Tennessee and ends just north of Nolensville.

== Route description ==
SR 253 begins in Brentwood, in Williamson County with a junction with US 31 (SR 6). It intersects I-65 at the Exit 71 interchange. It ends in southern Davidson County at an intersection with Nolensville Road (US 31A/US 41A/SR 11) just north of the Williamson/Davidson County line.

== Points of interest ==
The following is a list of landmarks visible from SR 253.

- WSM radio transmitting facility and tower
- Tower Park
- Concord Park

== Major intersections ==
| County | Location | mi | km | Destinations | Notes |
|---|---|---|---|---|---|
| Williamson | Brentwood | 0.00 | 0.00 | US 31 (Franklin Road/SR 6) – Downtown, Oak Hill, Franklin | Western terminus |
| Williamson | Brentwood | 0.7– 0.8 | 1.1– 1.3 | I-65 – Huntsville, Nashville | I-65 Exit 71 |
| Williamson | Brentwood | 1.7 | 2.7 | SR 252 (Wilson Pike) | |
| Davidson | Nashville | 7.3 | 11.7 | US 31A / US 41A (Nolensville Pike/SR 11) – Downtown Nashville, Nolensville | Eastern terminus |
1.000 mi = 1.609 km; 1.000 km = 0.621 mi
