= U.S. Route 31A =

U.S. Highway in Tennessee

U.S. Route 31A

Route information
- Maintained by TDOT
- Length: 76.94 mi (123.82 km)

Major junctions
- South end: US 31 in Pulaski
- I-65 near Cornersville; US 431 / US 31A Bus. / US 431 Bus. / SR 272 in Lewisburg; US 41A in Kirkland; I-840 in Triune; SR 155 in Nashville; I-440 in Nashville; I-40 / US 41 / US 70S in Nashville
- North end: US 31 / US 41 / US 41A / US 70S in Nashville

Location
- Country: United States
- State: Tennessee
- Counties: Giles, Marshall, Williamson, Rutherford, Davidson

Highway system
- United States Numbered Highway System; List; Special; Divided; Tennessee State Routes; Interstate; US; State
← US 31W	→ SR 31

U.S. Route 31A (US 31A) is a 76.94-mile-long (123.82 km) alternate route of U.S. Route 31 that exists between Nashville and Pulaski, Tennessee. It is located entirely in Middle Tennessee and except for the Lewisburg bypass, where it is concurrent with SR 106, it is entirely concurrent with unsigned State Route 11 (SR 11).

== Route description ==
US 31A begins in Giles County in Pulaski at an intersection with US 31 (SR 7) just north of downtown. It winds its way northeast through the hilly terrain of the Highland Rim for several miles to cross into Marshall County at an interchange with I-65 (Exit 22).

The highway then passes through the town of Cornersville, where it has a long concurrency with SR 129, before continuing northeast to enter Nashville Basin and the city of Lewisburg at an intersection with US 31A Business. Here SR 11 splits off and follows US 31A Business through downtown while US 31A follows a bypass route to the east (SR 106). It passes through neighborhoods before becoming concurrent with SR 272 and passing through a mix business and industrial areas. The highway then becomes concurrent with US 431 at an intersection with US 431 Business (SR 50) and they curve to the northwest to cross a bridge over a creek before coming to another intersection with US 31A Business/US 431 Business (SR 11), where US 31A, SR 11, and SR 272 split off and head northeast, with SR 272 splitting off shortly thereafter. US 31A continues northeast through farmland for several miles to pass through the community of Farmington, where it has an intersection between SR 64 and SR 271, before crossing the Duck River at Henry Horton State Park. It then enters the city limits of Chapel Hill, where it becomes concurrent with SR 99 and has an intersection with SR 270, before passing through downtown. SR 99 splits off and goes east shortly thereafter and US 31A then leaves Chapel Hill and passes through rural farmland for several miles to cross into Williamson County.

US 31A straddles the county line with Rutherford County for several miles, where it passes through the community of Allisona and has an intersection with SR 269, before re entering Williamson County to pass through the communities of College Grove and Kirkland, where it becomes concurrent with US 41A (SR 16) and crosses over the Harpeth River. US 31A/US 41A head north to pass through the community of Triune, where they have an interchange with I-840 (Exit 42) and have an intersection with SR 96, before passing through some hills to pass through the town of Nolensville and cross into Davidson County.

The highway immediately enters the Nashville city limits and passes northwest through suburban areas for several miles as Nolensville Pike, where it has intersections with SR 253 (Concord R, SR 254 (Old Hickory Boulevard), SR 255 (Harding Place), and SR 155 (Thompson Lane), as well as crossing over Mill Creek and Sevenmile Creek. US 31A/US 41A then begin passing through business districts as it has an interchange with I-440 (Four-Forty Parkway; Exit 6) before the highway splits into a one-way pair between 4th Avenue S and 2nd Avenue S. They then become concurrent with US 41/US 70S (SR 1/Lafayette Street) at an interchange with I-40 (Exit 210C). They turn west for a short distance before US 31A comes to an end at an roundabout with US 31 (SR 6/8th Avenue S).

== Major intersections ==
County	Location	mi	km	Destinations	Notes
Giles	Pulaski	0.0	0.0	US 31 (N 1st Street/SR 7/SR 11 south) – Elkton, Downtown, Columbia	Southern terminus; southern end of SR 11 concurrency
Giles–Marshall county line		11.1– 11.5	17.9– 18.5	I-65 – Nashville, Huntsville	Exit 22 on I-65
Marshall	Cornersville	13.5	21.7	SR 129 east (New Ostella Road) – Petersburg	Southern end of SR 129 concurrency
Marshall	Cornersville	16.1	25.9	SR 129 west (Lynnville Road) – Lynnville	Northern end of SR 129 concurrency
Marshall	Lewisburg	21.1	34.0	US 31A Bus. north (2nd Avenue/SR 11 north) SR 106 begins	Southern terminus of US 31A Business; northern end of SR 11 concurrency; southern terminus of SR 106; southern end of SR 106 concurrency
Marshall	Lewisburg	22.7	36.5	SR 272 south (Springplace Road)	Southern end of SR 272 concurrency
Marshall	Lewisburg	23.4	37.7	US 431 south (E Commerce Street/SR 50 east) – Petersburg, Fayetteville US 431 Bus. north (E Commerce Street/SR 50 west) – Downtown	Southern end of US 431 concurrency; southern terminus of US 431 Business
Marshall	Lewisburg	24.6	39.6	US 431 north (N Ellington Parkway/SR 106 north) – Columbia, Franklin US 31A Bus. south / US 431 Bus. south (Verona Avenue/SR 11 south) – Downtown	Northern end of US 431/SR 106 concurrency; northern terminus of US 31A Business/US 431 Business; southern end of SR 11 concurrency
Marshall	Lewisburg	24.8	39.9	SR 272 north (Verona Caney Road)	Northern end of SR 272 concurrency
Marshall	Farmington	29.6– 29.7	47.6– 47.8	SR 271 south (Belfast Farmington Road) – Belfast SR 64 east (Shelbyville Highway) – Shelbyville	Northern terminus of SR 271; western terminus of SR 64
Marshall	Henry Horton State Park	35.8– 35.9	57.6– 57.8	Clarence A. Powell Memorial Bridge over the Duck River	
Marshall	Chapel Hill	36.3	58.4	SR 99 west (Sylvester Chunn Highway) – Columbia	Southern end of SR 99 concurrency
Marshall	Chapel Hill	36.6	58.9	SR 270 east (Old Columbia Road) – Unionville, Shelbyville	Western terminus of SR 270
Marshall	Chapel Hill	39.6	63.7	SR 99 east (Eagleville Pike) – Eagleville	Northern end of SR 99 concurrency
Williamson	No major junctions				
Rutherford	Allisona	46.7	75.2	SR 269 east (Allisona Road) – Eagleville	Western terminus of SR 269
Williamson	Kirkland	50.8	81.8	Corporal Larry G. Buford Memorial Bridge over the Harpeth River	
Williamson	Kirkland	51.3	82.6	US 41A south (Shelbyville Highway/SR 16 south) – Eagleville, Shelbyville	Southern end of US 41A concurrency; northern terminus of SR 16
Williamson	Triune	54.0– 54.2	86.9– 87.2	I-840 – Franklin, Murfreesboro	Exit 42 on I-840; former SR 840
Williamson	Triune	54.7	88.0	SR 96 (Murfreesboro Road) – Franklin, Murfreesboro	
Davidson	Nashville	65.1	104.8	SR 253 west (Concord Road) – Brentwood	Eastern terminus of SR 253
Davidson	Nashville	66.1	106.4	Chandler Page Harris Memorial Bridge over Mill Creek	
Davidson	Nashville	68.8	110.7	SR 254 (Old Hickory Boulevard) – Brentwood, Antioch	
Davidson	Nashville	71.3	114.7	Bridge over Sevenmile Creek	
Davidson	Nashville	71.4	114.9	SR 255 (Harding Place) to I-65 / I-24 – Oak Hill, Donelson	Provides access to Nashville International Airport
Davidson	Nashville	73.8	118.8	SR 155 (Thompson Lane)	
Davidson	Nashville	74.6– 74.8	120.1– 120.4	I-440 (Four-Forty Parkway) – Memphis, Knoxville	Exit 6 on I-440
Davidson	Nashville	76.90	123.76	US 41 south / US 70S east (Lafayette Street/SR 1 east) I-40 to I-65 – Memphis, Knoxville	Southern end of US 41/US 70S/SR 1 concurrency; exit 210C on I-40
Davidson	Nashville	76.94	123.82	US 31 / US 41 north / US 41A north / US 70S west (8th Avenue S/SR 6/SR 11 north)	Northern terminus; roundabout
1.000 mi = 1.609 km; 1.000 km = 0.621 mi: Concurrency terminus

== Lewisburg business route ==
U.S. Route 31A Business
- Location: Lewisburg, Tennessee
- Length: 2.7 mi (4.3 km)

U.S. Route 31A Business (US 31A Business or US 31A Bus) is a Business route of U.S. Route 31A in Lewisburg, Tennessee, following US 31A’s original alignment through downtown. It is concurrent with unsigned State Route 11 (SR 11) for its entire length.

US 31A Bus begins at an intersection with US 31A (Cornersville Highway/S Ellington Parkway/SR 11/SR 106) at the southern edge of the city. It heads north along S 2nd Avenue to pass through neighborhoods for approximately two miles, where it crosses a bridge over a creek, before crossing under a railroad overpass to enter downtown. US 31A Bus then comes to an intersection with US 431 Bus (SR 50/E Commerce Street) and SR 373 (W Commerce Avenue), where US 31A Bus becomes concurrent with US 431 Bus/SR 50 and they traverse a roundabout around the Marshall County Courthouse before heading north along N 2nd Avenue. They pass by some more businesses before SR 50 splits off and heads northwest along College Street and Franklin Avenue. US 31A Bus/US 41A Bus turn northeast along Verona Avenue and pass through some neighborhoods before they come to an end at an intersection with US 31A/US 431/SR 106/SR 272 (N Ellington Parkway/Nashville Highway).

The entire route is in Lewisburg, Marshall County.

mi	km	Destinations	Notes
0.0	0.0	US 31A (Cornersville Highway / South Ellington Parkway / SR 11 south / SR 106 north) – Cornersville, Chapel Hill	Southern end of SR 11 concurrency; southern terminus
1.7	2.7	US 431 Bus. south (East Commerce Street / SR 50 east) – Petersburg, Fayetteville SR 373 west (West Commerce Street) – Culleoka	Southern end of US 431 Bus. and SR 50 concurrencies; eastern terminus of SR 373
2.0	3.2	SR 50 west (College Street) – Columbia	Northern end of SR 50 concurrency
2.7	4.3	US 431 north (North Ellington Parkway / SR 106 north) – Columbia, Franklin US 31A north / SR 272 north (Nashville Highway / SR 11 north) – Chapel Hill US 31A south / US 431 south / SR 272 south (North Ellington Parkway / SR 106 south)	Northern terminus of US 31A Bus. and US 431 Bus.; SR 11 continues north along US 31A/SR 272 (Nashville Highway).
1.000 mi = 1.609 km; 1.000 km = 0.621 mi: Concurrency terminus
