= Tennessee State Route 272 =

State highway in Tennessee, United States

State Route 272
- SR 272 highlighted in red

Route information
- Maintained by TDOT
- Length: 22.4 mi (36.0 km)
- Existed: July 1, 1983–present

Major junctions
- South end: SR 129 in Archer
- US 31A in Lewisburg; US 431 / US 31A Bus. / US 431 Bus. in Lewisburg
- North end: SR 99 near Chapel Hill

Location
- Country: United States
- State: Tennessee
- Counties: Marshall

Highway system
- Tennessee State Routes; Interstate; US; State
← SR 271	→ SR 273

State Route 272 (SR 272) is a 22.4-mile-long (36.0 km) north–south state highway located entirely within Marshall County in Middle Tennessee.

== Route description ==
SR 272 begins at an intersection with SR 129 in the community of Archer. It winds its way north as a two-lane highway through mountains for several miles before passing through farmland to enter Lewisburg, where it comes to an intersection and becomes concurrent with US 31A/SR 106. They bypass downtown as a four-lane undivided highway along the east side, where they pass through both residential and business areas and become concurrent with US 431 at an intersection with US 431 Business/SR 50. The highway then curves to the northwest to cross a bridge over a creek before coming to an intersection with US 31A Business/US 431 Business/SR 11, where US 31A and SR 272 split from US 431/SR 106 to follow SR 11 north. SR 272 splits off shortly thereafter and leaves Lewisburg to pass through a mix of farmland and wooded areas as a two-lane highway for the next several miles, where it passes through the community of Verona. The highway then crosses a bridge over the Duck River shortly before coming to an end at an intersection with SR 99 just a few miles southwest of Chapel Hill.

== Major intersections ==
The entire route is in Marshall County.

Location	mi	km	Destinations	Notes
Archer	0.0	0.0	SR 129 (New Ostella Road/Brown Shop Road) – Cornersville, Petersburg	Southern terminus
Lewisburg			US 31A south (S Ellington Parkway/SR 106 south) – Cornersville, Pulaski	Southern end of US 31A/SR 106 concurrency
Lewisburg			US 431 south (E Commerce Street/SR 50 east) – Petersburg, Fayetteville US 431 Bus. north (E Commerce Street/SR 50 west) – Downtown	Southern end of US 431 concurrency; southern terminus of US 431 Business
Lewisburg			US 431 north (N Ellington Parkway/SR 106 north) – Columbia, Franklin US 31A Bus. south / US 431 Bus. south (Verona Avenue/SR 11 south) – Downtown	Northern end of US 431/SR 106 concurrency; southern end of SR 11 concurrency; northern terminus of US 31A Business/US 431 Business
Lewisburg			US 31A north (Nashville Highway/SR 11 north) – Chapel Hill	Northern end of US 31A/SR 11 concurrency; provides access to Henry Horton State Park
			Alex Allen Memorial Bridge over the Duck River	
	22.4	36.0	SR 99 (Sylvester Chunn Highway) – Columbia, Chapel Hill	Northern terminus
1.000 mi = 1.609 km; 1.000 km = 0.621 mi: Concurrency terminus
