= U.S. Route 431 in Tennessee =

United States Numbered Highway in Tennessee

U.S. Route 431
- US 431 highlighted in red

Route information
- Auxiliary route of US 31
- Maintained by TDOT
- Length: 116.10 mi (186.84 km)
- Existed: January 1954–present

Major junctions
- South end: US 231 / US 431 at the Alabama state line south of Fayetteville
- US 64 in Fayetteville; I-840 near Thompson's Station; US 31 in Franklin; I-440 in Nashville; US 70 in Nashville; I-24 in Nashville; US 31W / US 41 in Nashville; I-24 / I-65 in Nashville; I-24 in Nashville; US 41 in Springfield
- North end: US 431 at the Kentucky state line near Springfield

Location
- Country: United States
- State: Tennessee
- Counties: Lincoln, Marshall, Maury, Williamson, Davidson, Robertson

Highway system
- United States Numbered Highway System; List; Special; Divided; Tennessee State Routes; Interstate; US; State
← SR 429	→ SR 431
← I-65	SR 65	→ SR 66

U.S. Route 431 (US 431) in Tennessee totals an estimated 116 miles (187 km) through Lincoln, Marshall, Maury, Williamson, Davidson, and Robertson counties in Middle Tennessee.

== Route description ==
=== Alabama state line to Nashville ===
US 431 runs concurrently with US 231 upon entry into Tennessee from Madison County, Alabama, where the concurrency begins. The state line also marks the beginning of a secret concurrency with, and the southern terminus of unsigned State Route 10 (SR 10). The two U.S. Routes plus SR 10 do not split until they reach downtown Fayetteville. While US 231 goes into a north-northeasterly path, US 431 turns northwest into Marshall County, bypassing around Lewisburg, and later into northeastern Maury and into Williamson County. It traverses the city of Franklin, Tennessee before entering the Metropolitan Nashville and Davidson County area.

In Nashville, US 431, known as Hillsboro Pike, traverses the exit 3 interchange on I-440, and eventually merges into US 70/SR 1 before entering the downtown area. US 431 then joins US 31 and US 41A onto the James Robertson Parkway. After crossing I-24's exit 47 interchange, US 431 then follows US 41 (SR 11) and US 31W towards the northern suburbs.

=== Nashville to the Kentucky state line ===
US 431, now paired with a secret SR 65 designation, then follows Trinity Lane, crossing the I-65/I-24 exit 87 interchange, and turns right onto Whites Creek Pike. A few miles later, it intersects Briley Parkway (SR 155) and Old Hickory Boulevard near Whites Creek. Like most major routes in and out of Nashville, US 431 crosses Old Hickory Boulevard. twice, the first time in the southern suburbs, and the other in the north. US 431/SR 65 continues northward to traverse I-24's Joelton interchange, exit 35, before entering Robertson County.

It traverses the Springfield area, running concurrently with US 41 (SR 11) through town. It then splits off again, and US 431 continues north to the Kentucky state line, which marks the northern terminus of SR 65.

=== Concurrencies and secret designations ===
In Tennessee, when a US Highway runs concurrently with a state highway, the state highway's designation is not signed, but is a secret designation. Along US 431 in Tennessee, the secret designations include:

- SR 10 from the Alabama state line to Fayetteville (in association with US 231);
- SR 50 from Fayetteville to Lewisburg;
- SR 106 from Lewisburg to the US 70S/SR 1 junction in Nashville;
- SR 1 in downtown Nashville (in association with US 70S);
- SR 24 in downtown Nashville (with US 70);
- SR 11 from downtown Nashville to the Trinity Lane intersection (in association with US 31/US 41/US 41A, and US 31W/US 41, including James Robertson Parkway), and through downtown Springfield (with US 41);
- SR 65 from Nashville to the Kentucky state line;
- SR 76 from downtown Springfield to the north side of Springfield.

== Major intersections ==
County	Location	mi	km	Destinations	Notes
Lincoln		0.0	0.0	US 231 south / US 431 south – Huntsville	Alabama state line; southern end of concurrency with unsigned SR 10
Lincoln	Park City	2.3	3.7	SR 275 east (Lincoln Road) – Flintville	Western terminus of SR 275
Lincoln	Fayetteville	9.2	14.8	SR 110 west (Ardmore Highway) – Kirkland, Taft, Ardmore	Eastern terminus of SR 110
Lincoln	Fayetteville	10.7	17.2	US 64 Byp. / US 231 north (Wilson Parkway/Thornton Taylor Parkway/SR 10 north) – Pulaski, Shelbyville, Winchester	Northern end of US 231 and unsigned SR 10 concurrency; southern end of concurrency with unsigned SR 273
Lincoln	Fayetteville	11.4	18.3	US 64 / SR 50 east (College Street/SR 15/SR 273 west) – Pulaski, Lynchburg, Winchester	Northern end of unsigned SR 273 concurrency; southern end of unsigned SR 50 concurrency
Lincoln	Petersburg	23.0	37.0	SR 244 south (Boonshill-Petersburg Road)	Northern terminus of SR 244
Marshall	Petersburg	24.2	38.9	SR 129 east / SR 130 east (Railroad Street) – Lynchburg, Shelbyville	Southern end of SR 129 concurrency; western terminus of SR 130
Marshall	Petersburg	25.6	41.2	SR 129 west (Delina Road) – Cornersville	Northern end of SR 129 concurrency
Marshall	Belfast	32.1	51.7	SR 271 north (Belfast-Farmington Road) – Farmington	Southern terminus of SR 271
Marshall	Lewisburg	36.5	58.7	US 31A south / SR 272 south (Ellington Parkway/SR 106 south) / US 431 Bus. north (E Commerce Street/SR 50 west) – Pulaski, Lewisburg	Southern end of US 31A/SR 272 and unsigned SR 106 concurrency; southern terminus of US 431 Bus.; northern end of unsigned SR 50 concurrency
Marshall	Lewisburg	37.7	60.7	US 31A Bus. south / US 431 Bus. south (Verona Avenue/SR 11 south) / US 31A north / SR 272 north (Nashville Highway/SR 11 north) – Downtown, Chapel Hill	Northern end of US 31A/SR 272 concurrency; northern terminus of US 31A Business/US 431 Bus.
Marshall	Lewisburg	38.9	62.6	SR 50 east (Franklin Road) – Downtown	Southern end of SR 50 concurrency
Marshall	Lewisburg	39.0	62.8	SR 417 south (W Ellington Parkway)	Northern terminus of SR 417
Marshall	Lewisburg	39.6	63.7	SR 50 west (Jim McCord Highway) – Columbia	Northern end of SR 50 concurrency
Maury		50.4	81.1	SR 99 east (Sylvester Chunn Highway) – Chapel Hill	Southern end of SR 99 concurrency
Maury		51.2	82.4	SR 99 west (Bear Creek Pike) to I-65 / US 412 – Columbia	Northern end of SR 99 concurrency
Williamson	Duplex	59.0	95.0	SR 247 west (Dulpex Road) – Spring Hill	Eastern terminus of SR 247
Williamson		64.3– 64.5	103.5– 103.8	I-840 to I-65 – Memphis, Knoxville	Exit 30 on I-840; former SR 840
Williamson	Franklin	67.1	108.0	SR 248 (Goose Creek Bypass)	
Williamson	Franklin	69.8	112.3	SR 397 / US 31 Truck / US 431 Truck (Mack Hatcher Memorial Parkway)	
Williamson	Franklin	72.2	116.2	US 31 / SR 96 east (Columbia Avenue/Main Street/SR 6) – Spring Hill, Murfreesboro, Brentwood	Southern end of SR 96 concurrency
Williamson	Franklin	72.3	116.4	SR 96 west (New Highway 96 W) – Fairview	Northern end of SR 96 concurrency
Williamson	Franklin	73.7	118.6	SR 397 / US 31 Truck / US 431 Truck (Mack Hatcher Memorial Parkway)	Northern terminus of SR 397/US 31 Truck/US 431 Truck
Williamson	Franklin	78.2	125.9	SR 46 west (Old Hillsboro Road) – Leipers Fork	Southern (signed eastern) terminus of SR 46
Davidson	Forest Hills	81.4	131.0	SR 254 (Old Hickory Boulevard) – Bellevue, Brentwood	
Davidson	Nashville	86.9	139.9	SR 155 (Woodmont Boulevard)	
Davidson	Nashville	87.5– 87.7	140.8– 141.1	I-440 (Four-Forty Parkway) to I-65 – Memphis, Knoxville	Exit 3 on I-440
Davidson	Nashville	90.0	144.8	US 70S west (Broadway/West End Avenue/SR 1 west)	Southern end of US 70S/SR 1 concurrency; northern terminus of unsigned SR 106
Davidson	Nashville	99.2	159.6	I-40 east / I-65 south – Knoxville, Huntsville	I-40 east/I-65 south accessed via 14th Avenue South
Davidson	Nashville	99.23	159.70	I-40 west / I-65 north / US 70 west (13th Avenue North/SR 24 west) – Memphis, Louisville	I-40 west/I-65 north accessed via 13th Avenue North; southern end of US 70/SR 24 concurrency
Davidson	Nashville	99.65	160.37	US 70 east (Broadway/SR 24 east) / US 70S east / US 31 south / US 41 south / US 41A south (8th Avenue S/SR 1 east/SR 6 south/SR 11 south)	Northern end of US 70S/SR 1/US 70/SR 24 concurrency; southern end of US 31/US 41/US 41A (SR 6/11) concurrency; follows James Robertson Parkway
Davidson	Nashville	100.35	161.50	US 41A north (Rosa L. Parks Boulevard/SR 12 north)	Northern end of US 41A concurrency; southern terminus of unsigned SR 12
Davidson	Nashville	101.6	163.5	Interstate Drive south to I-24 east – Chattanooga	
Davidson	Nashville	101.8	163.8	Main Street East (Old US 31E) – Hendersonville, Gallatin	
Davidson	Nashville	102.0	164.2	US 31E north (Ellington Parkway/SR 6 north)	US 31 splits into US 31E and US 31W; southern end of US 31W concurrency
Davidson	Nashville	102.3	164.6	Spring Street west to I-24 west – Clarksville	
Davidson	Nashville	104.4	168.0	US 31W north / US 41 north (Dickerson Pike/SR 11 north)	Northern end of US 31W/US 41/SR 11 concurrency; southern terminus and southern end of concurrency with unsigned SR 65
Davidson	Nashville	104.7– 104.9	168.5– 168.8	I-24 / I-65 – Nashville, Chattanooga, Clarksville, Louisville	Exit 87 on I-24/I-65
Davidson	Nashville	107.2– 107.3	172.5– 172.7	SR 155 (Briley Parkway)	Exit 19 on SR 155
Davidson	Whites Creek	109.7	176.5	SR 45 east (Old Hickory Boulevard) to I-24 – Madison	Western terminus of SR 45
Davidson	Nashville–Joelton line	113.9	183.3	Old Clarksville Pike west to US 41A	
Davidson	Nashville–Joelton line	114.6– 114.8	184.4– 184.8	I-24 – Clarksville, Nashville	Exit 35 on I-24
Robertson		123.3	198.4	SR 257 (Mount Zion Road) – Coopertown, Ridgetop	
Robertson	Springfield	127.2	204.7	US 41 south (Memorial Boulevard/SR 11 south) – Greenbrier, Ridgetop	Southern end of US 41/SR 11 concurrency
Robertson	Springfield	128.5	206.8	SR 49 / SR 76 east (5th Avenue) – Ashland City, White House, Orlinda	Southern end of SR 76 concurrency
Robertson	Springfield	130.0	209.2	US 41 north (Highway 41 N/SR 11 north/SR 76 west) – Adams, Hopkinsville, KY	Northern end of US 41/SR 11/SR 76 concurrency
Robertson	Springfield	130.3	209.7	SR 161 north – Allensville, KY	Southern terminus of SR 161
Robertson		133.1	214.2	SR 25 (Lakewood Road) – Cross Plains	
Robertson		138.6	223.1	US 431 north – Adairville, Russellville	Kentucky state line; northern terminus of unsigned SR 65
1.000 mi = 1.609 km; 1.000 km = 0.621 mi: Concurrency terminus; Incomplete access

== See also ==
- Roads in Nashville, Tennessee

U.S. Route 431
Previous state: Alabama	Tennessee	Next state: Kentucky
