= Tennessee State Route 270 =

State highway in Tennessee, United States

State Route 270
- Old Columbia Road
- SR 270 highlighted in red

Route information
- Maintained by TDOT
- Length: 9.5 mi (15.3 km)
- Existed: July 1, 1983–present

Major junctions
- West end: US 31A / SR 99 in Chapel Hill
- East end: US 41A near Unionville

Location
- Country: United States
- State: Tennessee
- Counties: Marshall, Bedford

Highway system
- Tennessee State Routes; Interstate; US; State
← SR 269	→ SR 271

State Route 270 (SR 270), also known as Old Columbia Road, is a 9.5-mile-long (15.3 km) east–west state highway in Middle Tennessee. It connects Chapel Hill with Unionville and Shelbyville.

== Route description ==
SR 270 begins in Marshall County in Chapel Hill at an intersection with US 31A/SR 11/SR 99 just south of downtown. It goes east to leave Chapel Hill and pass through wooded areas, where it crosses a bridge over a creek, before passing through farmland to cross into Bedford County. The highway winds its way southeast, where it crosses over another creek, and passes through farmland and rural areas for several miles before coming to an end at an intersection with US 41A/SR 16 between Unionville and Shelbyville. The entire route of SR 270 is a two-lane rural highway.

== Major intersections ==
County	Location	mi	km	Destinations	Notes
Marshall	Chapel Hill	0.0	0.0	US 31A / SR 99 (Nashville Highway/SR 11) – Lewisburg, Columbia, Eagleville, Nolensville	Western terminus
Bedford		9.5	15.3	US 41A (SR 16) – Eagleville, Unionville, Shelbyville	Eastern terminus
1.000 mi = 1.609 km; 1.000 km = 0.621 mi
