= Tennessee State Route 255 =

State highway in Tennessee, United States

State Route 255
- SR 255 highlighted in red

Route information
- Maintained by TDOT
- Length: 11.2 mi (18.0 km)
- Existed: July 1, 1983–present

Major junctions
- South end: US 31 in Oak Hill
- I-65 in Nashville; I-24 in Nashville; I-40 in Nashville
- North end: US 70 in Donelson

Location
- Country: United States
- State: Tennessee
- Counties: Davidson

Highway system
- Tennessee State Routes; Interstate; US; State
← SR 254	→ SR 256

State Route 255 (SR 255) is a south–north road in Davidson County, Tennessee that connects U.S. Route 31 (US 31) with US 70.

== Route description ==
State Route 255 (SR 255) begins at an intersection with US 31 (Franklin Pike) in Oak Hill, Tennessee, just south of Nashville, Tennessee. The highway heads east as Harding Place through suburban residential and commercial areas before crossing Interstate 65 at a diamond interchange. It continues east to an intersection with US 31A/US 41A (Nolensville Pike).

East of Nolensville Pike, SR 255 continues through southeast Nashville, passing commercial development and residential neighborhoods before reaching an interchange with Interstate 24. The route then curves north and becomes Donelson Pike. After crossing Mill Creek, the highway intersects US 41/US 70S (Murfreesboro Pike).

North of Murfreesboro Pike, SR 255 passes hotels, airport-related businesses, and commercial development while providing one of the primary access routes to Nashville International Airport. The route then reaches a diverging diamond interchange with Interstate 40 before continuing north through the Donelson neighborhood to its northern terminus at US 70 (Lebanon Pike), where the roadway continues as Donelson Pike.

== Major intersections ==
The entire route is in Davidson County.

Location	mi	km	Destinations	Notes
Oak Hill	0.0	0.0	US 31 (Franklin Pike/SR 6) – Brentwood, Berry Hill	Southern terminus
Oak Hill	0.6	0.97	I-65 – Nashville, Huntsville	I-65 exit 78 northbound; exit 78 A/B southbound
Nashville	2.8	4.5	US 31A / US 41A (Nolensville Pike/SR 11) – Nolensville, Downtown Nashville	
Nashville	4.3	6.9	I-24 – Nashville, Chattanooga	I-24 exit 56
Nashville	6.8	10.9	US 41 / US 70S (Murfreesboro Road/SR 1) – Downtown Nashville, Antioch	
Nashville	9.3	15.0	I-40 – Nashville, Knoxville	I-40 exit 216 westbound; exit 216 B eastbound
Donelson	11.2	18.0	US 70 (Lebanon Pike/SR 24) – Hermitage, Downtown Nashville	Northern terminus
1.000 mi = 1.609 km; 1.000 km = 0.621 mi

== See also ==
- List of state routes in Tennessee
