= Tennessee State Route 271 =

State highway in Tennessee, United States

State Route 271
- Belfast Farmington Road
- SR 271 highlighted in red

Route information
- Maintained by TDOT
- Length: 6.3 mi (10.1 km)
- Existed: July 1, 1983–present

Major junctions
- South end: US 431 in Belfast
- North end: US 31A / SR 64 in Farmington

Location
- Country: United States
- State: Tennessee
- Counties: Marshall

Highway system
- Tennessee State Routes; Interstate; US; State
← SR 270	→ SR 272

State Route 271 (SR 271), also known as Belfast Farmington Road, is a short 6.3 miles (10.1 km) long north–south state highway in Marshall County, Tennessee. It serves as a connection between the communities of Belfast and Farmington.

== Route description ==
SR 271 begins in Belfast at an intersection with US 431 (SR 50). It winds its way north to cross a bridge over a creek before passing through mix of rural farmland and hilly wooded terrain for several miles. The highway then crosses another creek before entering Farmington and coming to an end at an intersection between US 31A (SR 11) and SR 64. The entire route of SR 271 is a rural two-lane highway.

== Major intersections ==
The entire route is in Marshall County.

Location	mi	km	Destinations	Notes
Belfast	0.0	0.0	US 431 (Fayetteville Highway/SR 50) – Lewisburg, Petersburg, Fayetteville	Southern terminus
Farmington	6.3	10.1	US 31A (Nashville Highway/SR 11) – Lewisburg, Chapel Hill SR 64 east (Shelbyville Highway) – Shelbyville	Northern terminus; western terminus of SR 64
1.000 mi = 1.609 km; 1.000 km = 0.621 mi
