= Tennessee State Route 257 =

State highway in Tennessee, United States

State Route 257
- SR 257 highlighted in red

Route information
- Maintained by TDOT
- Length: 18.3 mi (29.5 km)
- Existed: July 1, 1983–present

Major junctions
- West end: SR 49 near Coopertown
- US 431 south of Springfield; US 41 in Ridgetop; I-65 in Millersville
- East end: US 31W in Millersville

Location
- Country: United States
- State: Tennessee
- Counties: Robertson, Sumner

Highway system
- Tennessee State Routes; Interstate; US; State
← SR 256	→ SR 258

State Route 257 (SR 257) is an east–west secondary state highway that traverses southern Robertson and western Sumner counties in Middle Tennessee.

== Route description ==
SR 257 originates at SR 49 near Coopertown. It traverses mainly rural areas of southern Robertson County, including its meeting with US 431. It crosses US 41 at Ridgetop.

SR 257 then closely follows the Robertson–Sumner county line along its way to the I-65 interchange. SR 257 ends at its junction with US 31W at Millersville, on the Sumner County side of the county line.

== Major intersections ==
County	Location	mi	km	Destinations	Notes
Robertson	Coopertown	0.0	0.0	SR 49 – Pleasant View, Springfield	Western terminus
Robertson				US 431 (Tom Austin Highway/SR 65) – Springfield, Joelton	
Robertson	Ridgetop			US 41 (SR 11) – Goodlettsville, Greenbrier	
Robertson	Millersville			I-65 – Nashville, Louisville	I-65 exit 104
Sumner	Millersville	18.3	29.5	US 31W (Louisville Highway/SR 41) – Goodlettsville, White House	Eastern terminus
1.000 mi = 1.609 km; 1.000 km = 0.621 mi
