= Interstate 440 (Tennessee) =

Highway in Nashville, Tennessee, United States

Interstate 440
- Four-Forty Parkway; Debra K. Johnson Memorial Parkway
- I-440 highlighted in red

Route information
- Auxiliary route of I-40
- Maintained by TDOT
- Length: 7.64 mi (12.30 km)
- Existed: November 12, 1958–present
- History: Completed April 3, 1987
- NHS: Entire route

Major junctions
- West end: I-40 in Nashville
- I-65 in Nashville
- East end: I-24 in Nashville

Location
- Country: United States
- State: Tennessee
- Counties: Davidson

Highway system
- Interstate Highway System; Main; Auxiliary; Suffixed; Business; Future; Tennessee State Routes; Interstate; US; State
← SR 438	→ US 441

Interstate 440 (I-440) is an east–west auxiliary Interstate Highway that runs through Nashville, Tennessee. It serves as a southern bypass around downtown Nashville, and is located on average about three miles (4.8 km) from the center of the city. I-440 is also known locally as the Four-Forty Parkway, and is designated as the Debra K. Johnson Memorial Parkway. At a length of 7.64 miles (12.30 km), I-440 runs between I-40 and I-24, and connects to I-65 and multiple U.S. Routes. Combined, I-440 and Briley Parkway, a controlled-access segment of State Route 155 (SR 155), form a noncontiguous inner beltway around downtown Nashville.

Originally proposed in the 1950s, I-440 was the subject of much controversy related to its location and design, which resulted in multiple design changes and delayed the highway's completion for many years. As a result, it was the last segment of Interstate Highway planned for Tennessee by the Federal-Aid Highway Act of 1956 to be constructed. After its completion in 1987, I-440 developed unforeseen congestion, safety, and surface issues, which prompted a reconstruction of the entire route that was completed in 2020.

== Route description ==
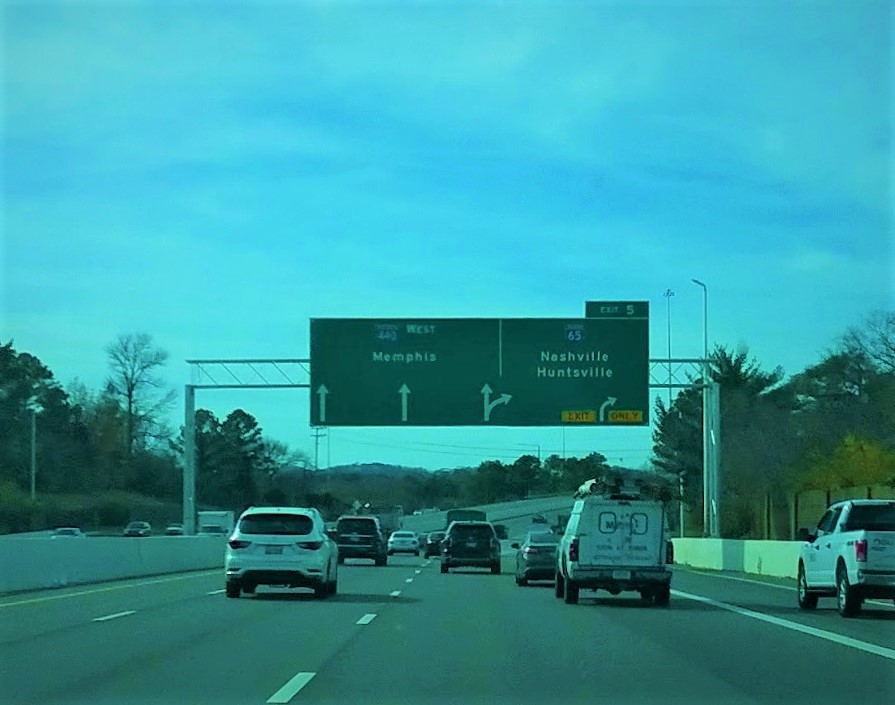
I-440 westbound at the I-65 interchange

The majority of I-440 is located below the level of adjoining streets and roads in an artificially-cut gulch. It contains three through lanes in each direction for its entire length, as well as auxiliary lanes in many locations. In 2025, annual average daily traffic (AADT) volumes on the Interstate ranged from 71,805 vehicles per day at the U.S. Route 70S (US 70S) intechange to 122,005 vehicles per day directly east of the interchange with I-65.

I-440 begins west of downtown Nashville at a directional T interchange with I-40 south of Tennessee State University and heads directly south. It immediately crosses a CSX railroad mainline and U.S. Route 70 (US 70, Charlotte Pike), but does not have an interchange with this route. About 1.5 miles (2.4 km) later, the Interstate turns southeast and reaches a partial cloverleaf interchange (parclo) with US 70S (West End Avenue), which is indirectly accessible from the eastbound lanes via a connector road. Turning further southeast and passing near Centennial Park and Vanderbilt University, the highway has a parclo interchange with US 431 (21st Avenue, South Hillsboro Pike) some distance beyond. I-440 then turns directly east and reaches I-65 south of downtown Nashville about two miles (3.2 km) later in the top level of a symmetrical four-level "Spaghetti Junction" stack interchange, which includes four flyover ramps. It also crosses another CSX line and US 31 (Franklin Pike) at this location, but this route is not accessible. Briefly entering the city of Berry Hill, the Interstate turns east-northeast and meets US 31A/US 41A (Nolensville Pike) about 1.5 miles (2.4 km) later at a final parclo interchange where it also passes under another CSX line. A short distance later, the freeway crosses a fourth and final CSX mainline and reaches its eastern terminus at a directional T interchange with I-24, west of the Nashville International Airport and about one mile (1.6 km) south of the eastern end of a concurrency between I-24 and I-40. As a result of this, I-440 westbound is directly accessible at this interchange from I-40 westbound, and US 41/70S (Murfreesboro Road) is directly accessible from the ramp that carries I-440 eastbound traffic to I-24 westbound.

== History ==
=== Planning ===
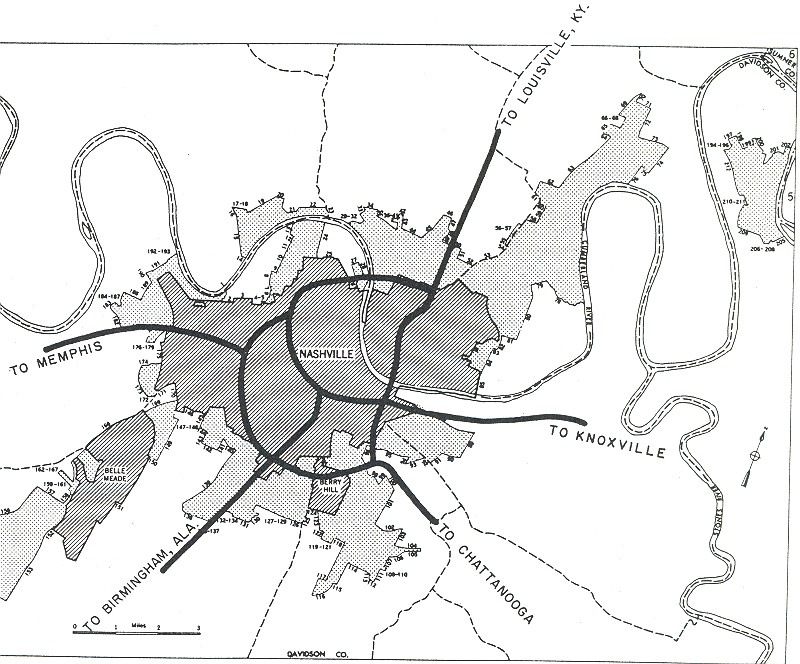
1955 Bureau of Public Roads highway plan for Nashville

The route that is now Interstate 440 had its origins in 1955, when the Interstate Highway System was being planned. The highway was approved by the Bureau of Public Roads (BPR), the predecessor to the Federal Highway Administration (FHWA), on August 24, 1956, and was initially referred to as Segment #516. After the passage of the Federal-Aid Highway Act of 1956, which initiated the Interstate system, a public meeting was held on May 15, 1957, that identified proposed Interstate Highways and bypass routes around Nashville, including what would become I-440. The route numbering was approved by the American Association of State Highway Officials on November 12, 1958. The Tennessee Department of Highways, the predecessor to the Tennessee Department of Transportation (TDOT), was first authorized to begin studies related to right-of-way acquisition on July 12, 1961, by the BPR, and preliminary engineering work began in 1964. Planners chose to construct the route through both residential neighborhoods and in the location of a portion of the Tennessee Central Railway. The highway department was authorized to make right-of-way acquisitions for the section located between I-65 and I-24 on December 4, 1968, and the section between I-40 and I-65 on August 17, 1970.

The project experienced many setbacks and was subject to much controversy. After the National Environmental Policy Act (NEPA) became law in 1970, the FHWA determined in January 1971 that the I-440 project did not require an environmental impact statement, since it was already in the right-of-way acquisition phase, and gave final approval of the project's design. A lawsuit was filed by the National Wildlife Federation in 1973, which resulted in the requirement of an environmental impact study for I-440. The draft environmental impact statement was completed in 1978, and was approved by the FHWA on June 19 of that year. Approval of the final environmental impact statement occurred on September 19, 1980, and on February 20, 1981, TDOT was approved to begin advertising bids for construction of I-440.

The construction of I-440 required the demolition of many houses, and many Nashville residents opposed the project. Throughout the 1970s, many groups campaigned to stop the construction of the highway. Many residents of the areas near I-440 wanted TDOT to choose an alternative, such as constructing the route further to the south, widening existing surface streets, or adding more public transportation. However, traffic studies determined that the highway was necessary to relieve congestion on I-40. On December 9, 1980, a group of community activists known as the "Nashvillians Against I-440" filed a lawsuit, which named then-U.S. Secretary of Transportation Andrew L. Lewis Jr. as the defendant, in the U.S. District Court for the Middle District of Tennessee hoping to stop construction of the Interstate. The lawsuit was dismissed on September 23, 1981, when a judge ruled that the project would not adversely affect the natural environment and that TDOT had followed all necessary procedures.

=== Construction and early history ===
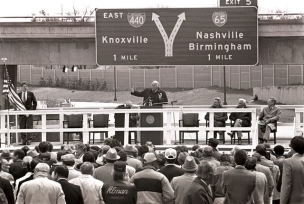
Opening ceremony in 1987

Construction began in early 1982. The project required the removal of hundreds of thousands of cubic feet of dirt and rock. Initially, I-440 was going to be at-grade, but TDOT engineers chose to build it below the surface of the ground to reduce noise and vehicle emissions pollution after citizens in large cities living near Interstates had complained of disturbances caused by highway traffic. The state also agreed to take measures to reduce the impact of the Interstate as a further compromise to opposition by such means as designing the route as a parkway. This included separating the lanes by a narrow grassy median, which unintentionally made the route susceptible to crossover crashes, and curbed inner edges. Engineers chose to construct the highway with concrete rather than asphalt so it would last longer. Most of I-440 contained three lanes in each direction, except through the interchanges with Murphy Road, US 70S, US 431, and I-65, where it contained two lanes in each direction, with the third lanes functioning as auxiliary lanes in most places. A proposed interchange at Granny White Pike, which TDOT had acquired the right-of-way for, was abandoned in an effort to prevent the disruption of traffic patterns on nearby surface streets. The discovery of hairline cracks in multiple overpasses and ramps in the spring of 1985, which were repaired with epoxy cement, delayed the opening of I-440 by approximately eight months.

The section of I-440 between I-24 and I-65 was opened and dedicated on December 12, 1985, and the section between I-65 and I-40 was opened and dedicated on April 3, 1987. It was the last Interstate Highway that was originally allocated to Tennessee by the Interstate Highway Act to be completed. It was also the most expensive road, per mile, built in Tennessee at the time, with a total cost of $178.3 million (equivalent to $433 million in 2025). In the first year that I-440 was open, traffic on I-40 decreased by about 16 percent. Trucks were initially prohibited from using I-440, due to pressure from nearby residents concerned about noise pollution, but this ban was blocked by a federal court in 1988 after being challenged by multiple trucking organizations. The speed limit was initially 55 miles per hour (90 km/h), which was increased to 65 mph (105 km/h) in July 2000, but reduced back to 55 mph in June 2005 after complaints from motorists.

Between November 1994 and November 1995, TDOT made safety modifications to I-24 through the eastern terminus with I-440 and the nearby split with I-40, which reconfigured the routes to provide direct access to I-440 westbound from I-40 westbound. The ramp connecting I-40 eastbound to I-440 eastbound at the western terminus of I-440 was widened from one to two lanes between November 1995 and June 1996. Between May 1997 and December 1998 the ramp carrying traffic from I-440 eastbound to I-24 westbound was widened from one to two lanes, including the flyover bridge over I-24.

=== Recent history and reconstruction ===
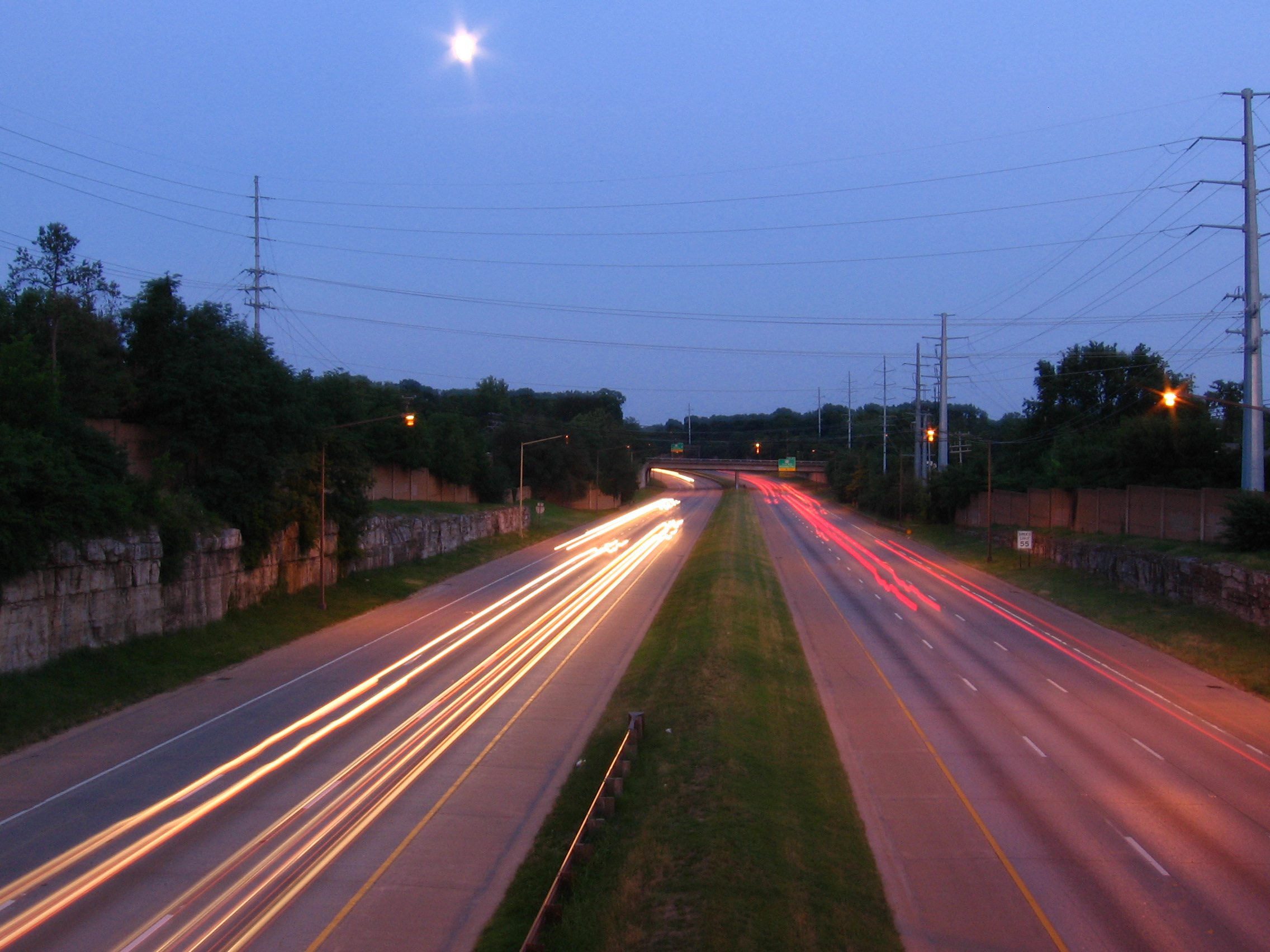
I-440 near the US 431 interchange prior to reconstruction

I-440 was built with a design capacity of 64,000 vehicles per day. By 1999, the average annual daily traffic had surpassed 100,000 vehicles in some locations, and the entire route had begun to experience severe congestion every day during rush hour. By the 2000s, I-440 had begun to develop cracks and potholes, and in 2009 TDOT spent $8 million to rehabilitate the roadway. This included diamond grinding, where grooves were cut parallel to traffic flow in the lanes to improve traction. This was necessitated because the surface had been worn away due to overuse, causing a susceptibility of vehicles to hydroplane. Between June and November 2013, TDOT spent $9.7 million to repair the concrete on I-440 eastbound between I-65 and I-24, which also included adding an additional lane through the interchange with US 31A/US 41A. Despite these improvements, I-440 continued to develop potholes, which prompted TDOT to prepare for reconstruction of the entire route.

After the Tennessee General Assembly passed the IMPROVE Act in 2017, which increased the state's fuel taxes and vehicle registration fees with the intent of funding a backlog of 962 needed transportation projects, TDOT announced that an upgrade of I-440 was a top priority. In November 2017 plans were announced for reconstruction of the route, which included replacing the concrete with asphalt, widening the entire route to a minimum of six lanes, replacing the grass median with a jersey barrier, and improving entrance and exit ramps. The contract for reconstruction was awarded on August 1, 2018. Preliminary work began in late November 2018, and the reconstruction project began on March 1, 2019. The project was completed on July 2, 2020, almost one month ahead of schedule. The project cost $154.8 million, and was at the time the most expensive contract ever awarded by TDOT.

On February 21, 2021, I-440 was designated as the Debra K. Johnson Memorial Parkway in honor of a Tennessee Department of Corrections (TDOC) officer killed in the line of duty in 2019.

== Exit list ==
The entire route is in Davidson County.

Location	mi	km	Exit	Destinations	Notes
Nashville	0.00	0.00	—	I-40 – Memphis, Nashville	Western terminus; I-40 exit 206
Nashville	1.47	2.37	1	Murphy Road	Eastbound exit and westbound entrance
Nashville	1.47	2.37	1A	US 70S (West End Avenue / SR 1)	Signed as exit 1 westbound
Nashville	2.82	4.54	3	US 431 (21st Avenue / Hillsboro Pike / SR 106)	
Nashville–Berry Hill line	4.82	7.76	5	I-65 – Nashville, Huntsville	"Spaghetti junction", one of two four-level stack interchanges in Tennessee; I-65 exit 80
Nashville	6.29	10.12	6	US 31A / US 41A (Nolensville Pike / SR 11)	
Nashville	7.64	12.30	—	I-24 east – Chattanooga	Eastbound exit and westbound left entrance; I-24 exit 53; entrance ramp includes direct entrance from I-40 westbound; I-40 exit 213B
Nashville	7.64	12.30	—	US 41 / US 70S (Murfreesboro Pike / SR 1)	Eastbound exit only
Nashville	7.64	12.30	—	I-24 west to I-40 east – Nashville, Knoxville	Eastern terminus; connection to Nashville International Airport; I-24 exit 53
1.000 mi = 1.609 km; 1.000 km = 0.621 mi: Incomplete access
