= James Robertson Parkway =

Street in Nashville, Tennessee, United States

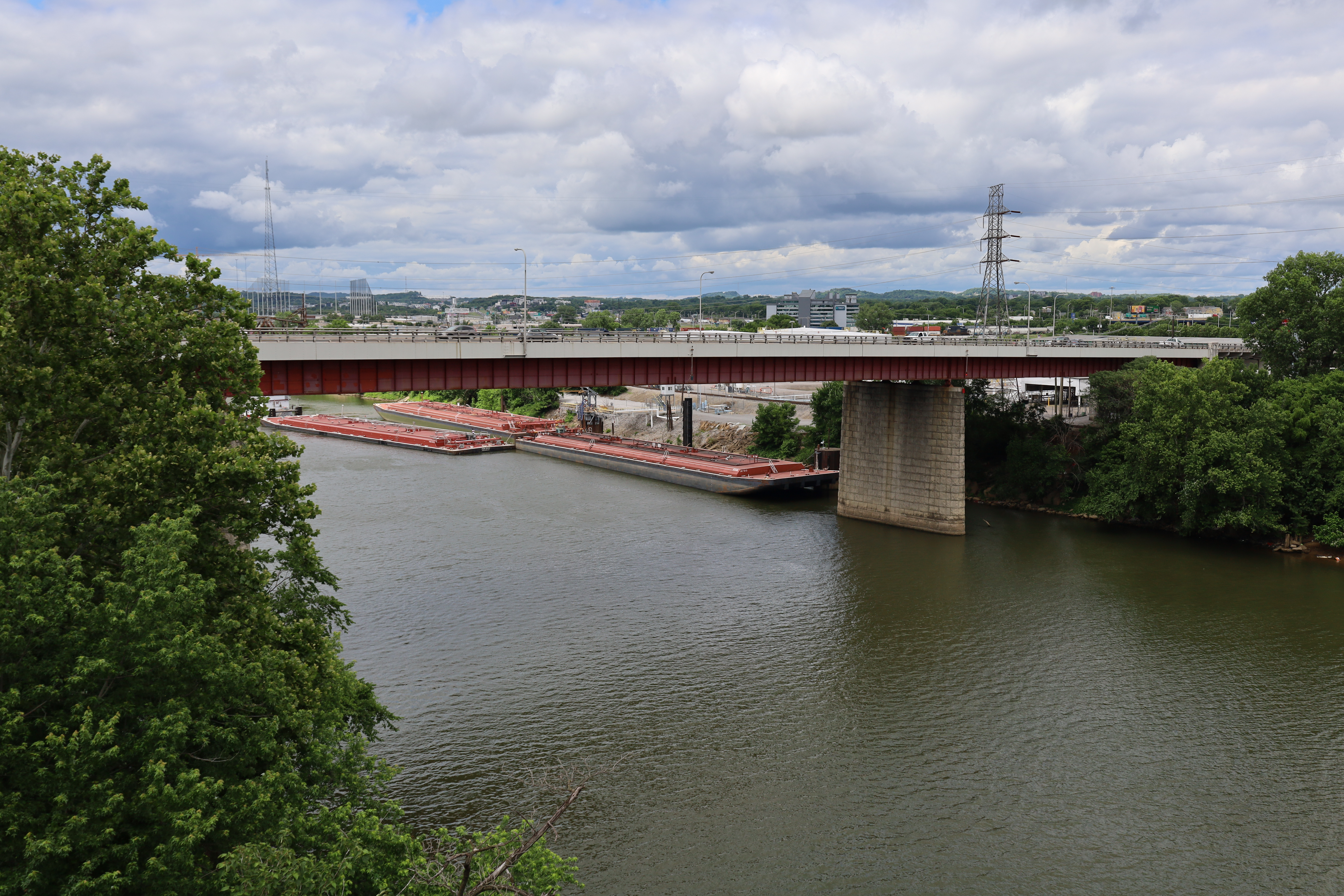
- The parkway crossing the Cumberland River over the Victory Memorial Bridge
- Length: 2.07 mi (3.33 km)
- West end: US 31 / US 41A / SR 6 / US 41
- Major junctions: US 41A / SR 12; I-24
- East end: US 31W / US 31E / US 41 / US 431 / SR 11 / SR 6

James Robertson Parkway is a four-lane major thoroughfare in Nashville, Tennessee. It is a bypass route within the downtown Nashville area that includes portions of the alignments of three U.S. Highways, two of them with unsigned Tennessee state highway designations. Since all parts of the street includes alignments of U.S. and state routes, the road is maintained by the Tennessee Department of Transportation (TDOT).

== Route description ==
The street is a four-lane divided street that begins at a crossroad intersection that involves Church Street and 8th Avenue. From there, it travels to an intersection with Rosa L. Parks Boulevard (8th Avenue North / U.S. Route 41A / US 41A). It turns to an easterly course and then crosses the Cumberland River on the Victory Memorial Bridge and meets Interstate 24 (I-24). After this point, the parkway ends at the intersection of Spring Street and Main Street near the southern end of the Ellington Parkway.

The street is crossed by 8th Avenue (Rosa L. Parks Boulevard), Gay Street, 7th Avenue, 6th Avenue, 5th Avenue, 4th Avenue, 3rd Avenue, and Interstate Drive. Charlotte Avenue and Union Street also intersect the parkway, but are carried over the parkway on overpasses. Throughout its entire length, it carries US 31, US 41, US 41A, and US 431. US 31/US 41 also bring along their "hidden" unsigned companion state route designations SR 6 and SR 11, respectively.

== Landmarks along the street ==
Landmarks along the street include the Bicentennial Capitol Mall State Park, the television studio of WTVF, the Musicians Hall of Fame and Museum, and the Davidson County Courthouse. The Tennessee State Capitol building is also visible from the parkway, with the north grounds extending to the parkway. Not too far off from the parkway via 5th Avenue is First Horizon Park, the home stadium of Minor League Baseball's Nashville Sounds baseball team. The Nashville Municipal Auditorium is also visible from the parkway.

== History ==
James Robertson Parkway was constructed as part of an urban renewal project in Nashville in the 1950s. The project was funded by the federal Housing Act of 1949, and involved demolition of many run-down structures in and around downtown Nashville. The Victory Memorial Bridge was dedicated and opened on May 19, 1956, in a ceremony officiated by county executive Beverly Briley and state highway commissioner W. M. Leech. On November 7, 1958, the remainder of the road, including the section that is now part of Rosa L. Parks Boulevard, was dedicated and opened by Nashville mayor Ben West. On July 23, 2026, Metropolitan Nashville Police lieutenant Mike Hotz saved a 44-year-old man from attempting suicide and jumping off the bridge.
