= Tennessee State Route 254 =

State highway in Tennessee, United States

State Route 254
- Old Hickory Boulevard; Bell Road
- SR 254 highlighted in red

Route information
- Maintained by TDOT
- Length: 17.3 mi (27.8 km)
- Existed: July 1, 1983–present

Major junctions
- West end: SR 100 in Bellevue
- US 431 in Forest Hills; US 31 in Brentwood; I-65 in Brentwood; US 31A / US 41A in Nashville; I-24 in Antioch
- East end: US 41 / US 70S in Antioch

Location
- Country: United States
- State: Tennessee
- Counties: Davidson

Highway system
- Tennessee State Routes; Interstate; US; State
← SR 253	→ SR 255

State Route 254 (SR 254) is a west–east state highway in Davidson County, Tennessee. For the majority of its length, it forms part of Old Hickory Boulevard, with the rest known as Bell Road.

== Route description ==
From its beginning at SR 100, SR 254 forms part of Old Hickory Boulevard. It passes between Percy Warner Park and Edwin Warner Park to enter Forest Hills. This is a predominantly residential area. After it intersects Granny White Pike, Old Hickory Boulevard goes north of Brentwood and then crosses I-65 at exit 74. It continues through more residential area until the intersection with US 31A/US 41A (Nolensville Pike). Just east of this intersection, State Route 254 leaves Old Hickory Boulevard and becomes Bell Road, whence it continues as Bell Road past I-24 exit 59 to US 41/US 70S (Murfreesboro Pike). From that intersection, Bell Road continues on without a designation.

=== Names ===
- Old Hickory Boulevard - from SR 100 to Old Hickory Boulevard/Benzing Road/Bell Road.
- Bell Road - from Old Hickory Boulevard to Murfreesboro Pike.

== Major intersections ==
The entire route is in Davidson County.

Location	mi	km	Destinations	Notes
Bellevue	0.0	0.0	SR 100 – Pasquo, Belle Meade	Western terminus
Forest Hills			US 431 (Hillsboro Road/SR 106) – Franklin, Green Hills	
Brentwood			US 31 (Franklin Road/SR 6) – Franklin, Oak Hill	
Brentwood			I-65 – Nashville, Huntsville	I-65 exits 74 A/B
Nashville			US 31A / US 41A (Nolensville Pike/SR 11) – Nolensville, Downtown	
Antioch			I-24 – Nashville, Chattanooga	I-24 exit 59
Antioch	17.3	27.8	US 41 / US 70S (Murfreesboro Pike/SR 1) – Nashville, La Vergne	Eastern terminus
1.000 mi = 1.609 km; 1.000 km = 0.621 mi

== See also ==
- List of state routes in Tennessee
