= Interstate 65 =

Interstate Highway from Alabama to Indiana

Interstate 65
- I-65 highlighted in red

Route information
- Length: 887.30 mi (1,427.97 km)
- Existed: August 14, 1957–present
- NHS: Entire route

Major junctions
- South end: I-10 in Mobile, AL
- I-85 in Montgomery, AL; I-20 / I-59 in Birmingham, AL; I-40 in Nashville, TN; I-24 in Nashville, TN; I-64 / I-71 in Louisville, KY; I-69 / I-74 in Indianapolis, IN; I-70 in Indianapolis, IN; I-80 / I-94 in Gary, IN; I-90 in Gary, IN
- North end: US 12 / US 20 in Gary, IN

Location
- Country: United States
- States: Alabama, Tennessee, Kentucky, Indiana

Highway system
- Interstate Highway System; Main; Auxiliary; Suffixed; Business; Future

Interstate 65 (I-65) is a major north–south Interstate Highway in the east-central region of the United States. As with most primary Interstates ending in 5, it is a major crosscountry, north–south route, connecting between the Great Lakes and the Gulf of Mexico. Its southern terminus is located at an interchange with I-10 in Mobile, Alabama, and its northern terminus is at an interchange with U.S. Route 12 (US 12) and US 20 (the Dunes Highway) in Gary, Indiana, just southeast of Chicago. I-65 connects several major metropolitan areas in the Midwest and Southern US. It connects the four largest cities in Alabama: Mobile, Montgomery, Birmingham, and Huntsville. It also serves as one of the main north–south routes through Nashville, Tennessee; Louisville, Kentucky; and Indianapolis, Indiana, each the largest metropolitan area in their respective state.

== Route description ==
Lengths
	mi	km
AL	366.22	590.63
TN	121.71	195.87
KY	137.32	221.00
IN	261.27	420.47
Total	887.30	1427.97

=== Alabama ===
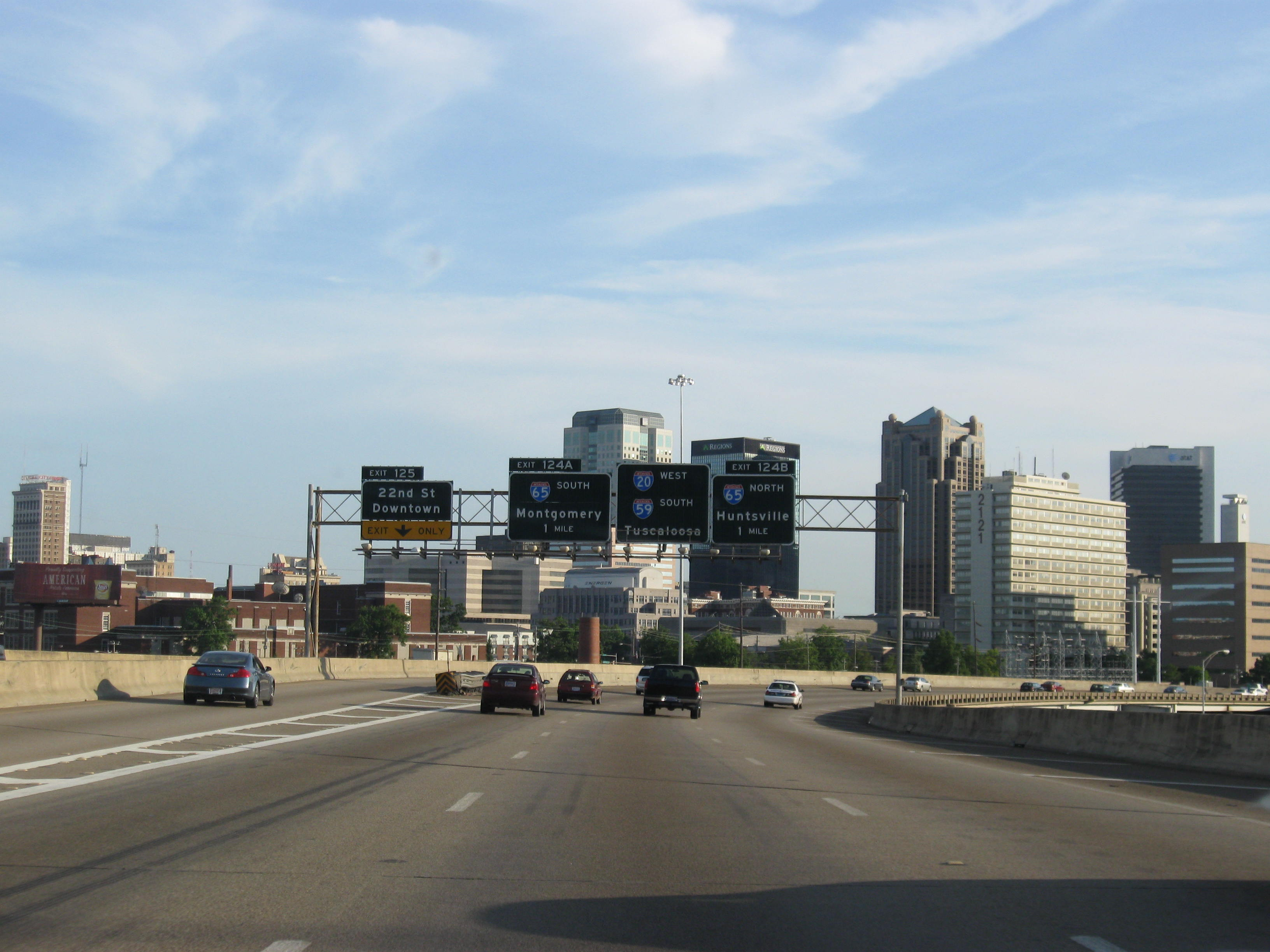
Approaching an exit for I-65 in downtown Birmingham

In Alabama, I-65 passes through or near four major metropolitan areas: Mobile, Montgomery, Birmingham, and Huntsville. I-65 begins its path northward in Mobile at its junction with I-10. From I-10, I-65 runs west of downtown Mobile and through the northern suburbs of the city before turning northeast towards Montgomery. In Montgomery, I-65 connects with the southern end of I-85. In the Birmingham suburbs, I-65 has an interchange with I-459 and another interchange in the city at I-20/I-59. North of downtown, I-22 branches off I-65 toward Memphis. From Birmingham, I-65 continues north, crossing the Tennessee River near Decatur. A few miles north of the river, it intersects I-565, a short spur route which provides access to Huntsville. It then continues north out of the Tennessee Valley to Tennessee toward Nashville.

=== Tennessee ===
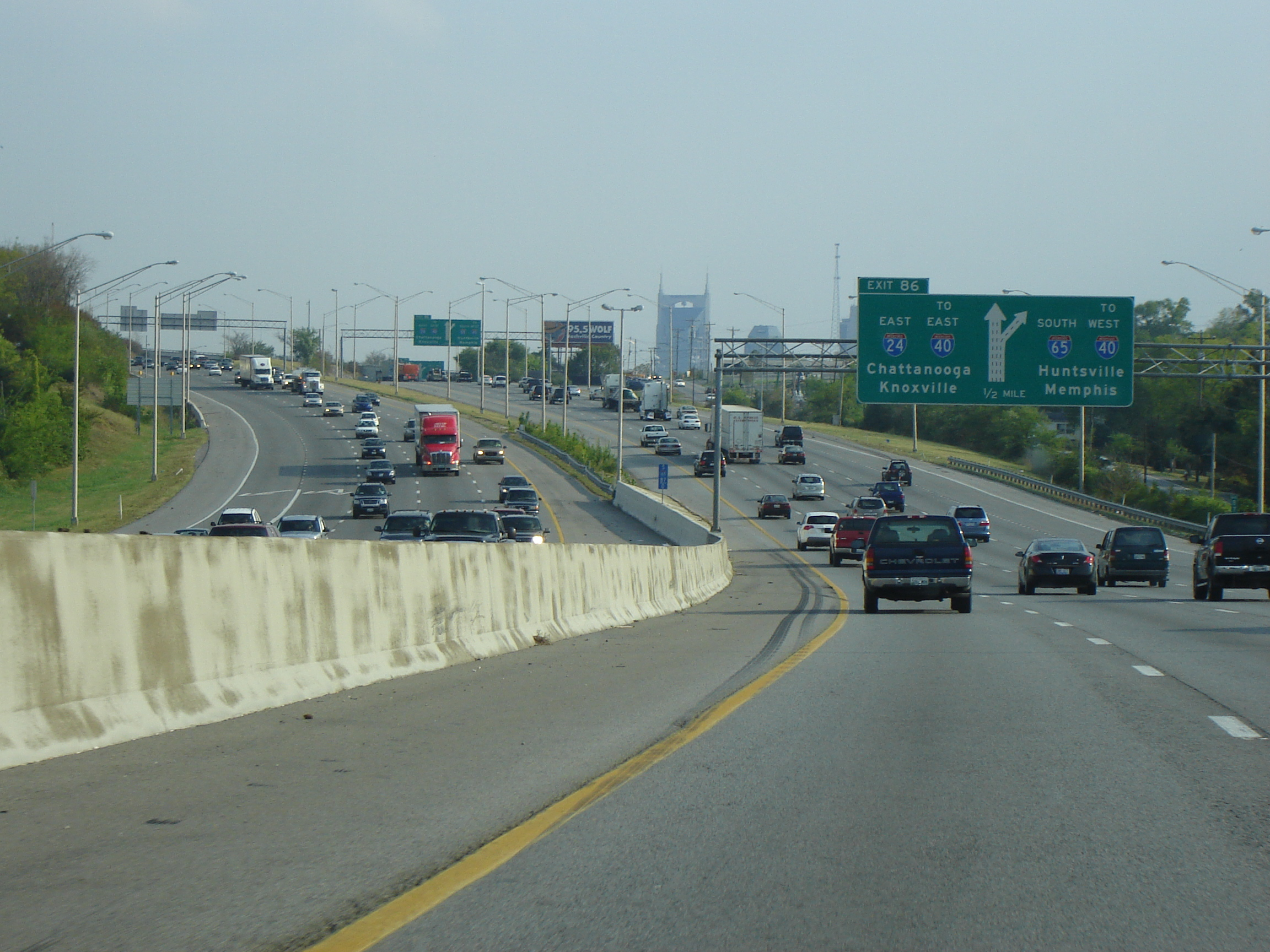
I-65 southbound in Nashville

I-65 enters Tennessee from the south near the town of Ardmore and passes through mostly rural territory for 65 miles (105 km), where it also passes Lewisburg. Then it passes close to Columbia and crosses Saturn Parkway, which brings travelers to the town of Spring Hill. I-65 then continues on to reach I-840 and progresses until it intersects State Route 96 (SR 96) at Franklin. Then the highway goes through Brentwood, and enters Nashville, where it first interchanges with I-440. It then has brief concurrences with I-40 and I-24 near downtown Nashville. The freeway then meets State Route 155 (SR 155, Briley Parkway), and after passing through Madison, meets SR 386 (Vietnam Veterans Boulevard) in Goodlettsville. The freeway then passes through Millersville and White House, and then crosses into Kentucky near Portland.

=== Kentucky ===
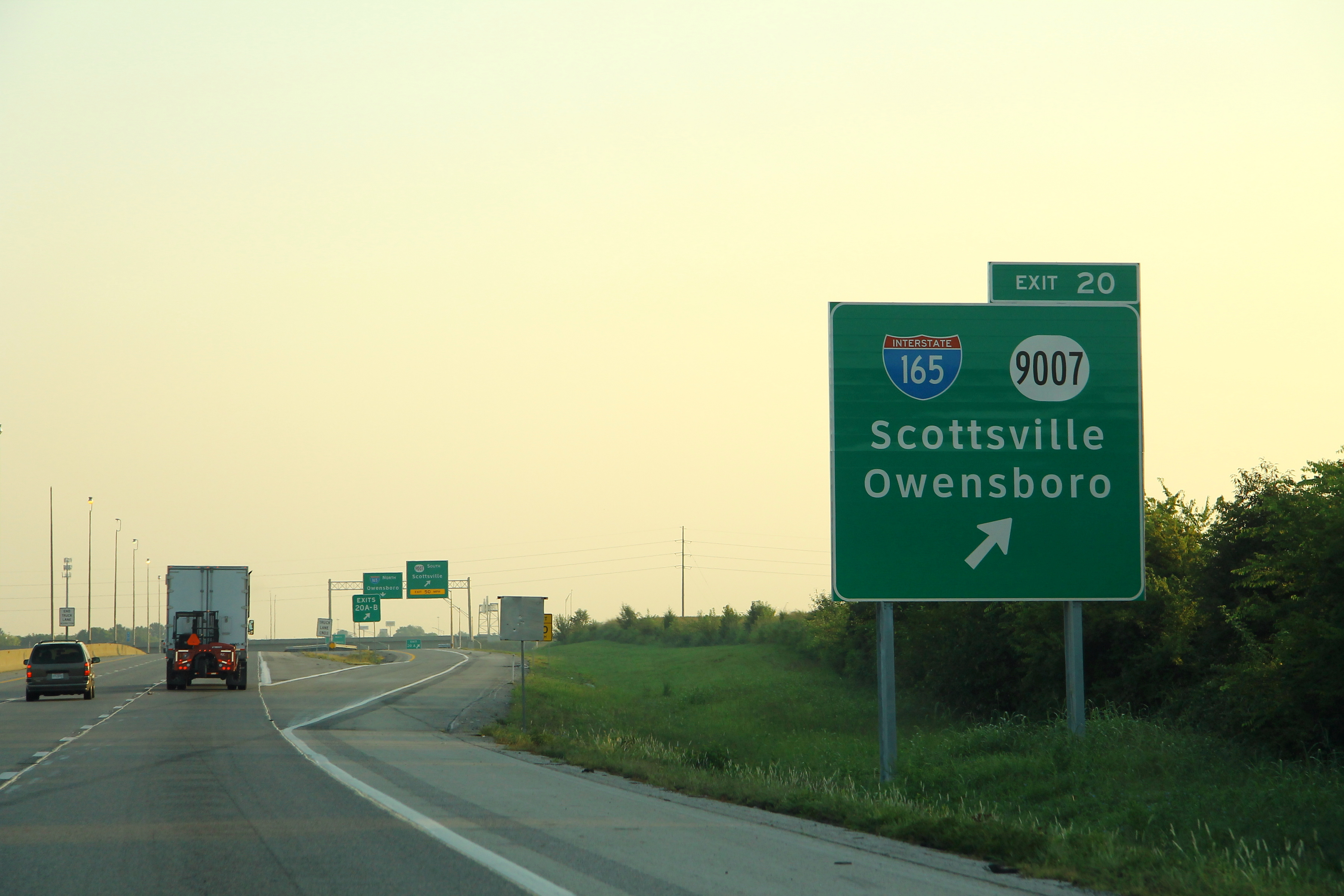
I-65 northbound near the I-165 interchange in Bowling Green, Kentucky

I-65 enters the state of Kentucky five miles (8.0 km) south of Franklin. Throughout its length, it passes near Mammoth Cave National Park, Bernheim Arboretum and Research Forest, the National Corvette Museum, and Fort Knox.

The first major intersection in the state is with I-165 (formerly the William H. Natcher Parkway) at Bowling Green. I-65 has intersections with three of the parkways in the state. The first major junction is with the Cumberland Parkway near Rocky Hill. At Elizabethtown, it has two more parkway interchanges with the Wendell H. Ford Western Kentucky Parkway and the Martha Layne Collins Bluegrass Parkway. In Louisville, I-65 also has interchanges with I-265, I-264, I-64, and I-71.

The widest stretch of I-65 in its entirety is in Louisville at Kentucky Route 1065 (KY 1065, Outer Loop), where the main line is 14 lanes wide. The highway crosses the Ohio River into Indiana on a toll bridge. The southbound side is called the John F. Kennedy Memorial Bridge (southbound) and the northbound side is called the Abraham Lincoln Bridge. The latter bridge opened in October 2016 as part of the Ohio River Bridges Project. Before the project, the John F. Kennedy Memorial Bridge (completed in 1963) carried traffic in both directions. The project also included reconstruction of the I-65/I-64/I-71 convergence interchange just south of the Kennedy Bridge, as well as renovating the older span to carry six lanes of southbound traffic. Additionally, a second six-lane cable-stayed bridge 12 miles (19 km) upstream on the Ohio River, the Lewis and Clark Bridge, was built as part of the project, opening in December 2016 to complete the I-265 loop around Louisville.

At one time, the 65-mile (105 km) stretch of I-65 from Louisville to Elizabethtown was a toll road, called the Kentucky Turnpike. The bonds that financed the road have been paid off, and tolls are no longer collected. All signs of the former turnpike have been removed.

On November 15, 2006, the stretch of I-65 from Bowling Green to Louisville was renamed the Abraham Lincoln Memorial Expressway.

On February 12, 2007, a bill passed the Kentucky Senate to rename I-65 in Jefferson County the Dr. Martin Luther King Jr. Expressway. Signs were posted July 25, 2007.

On July 15, 2007, Kentucky highway officials raised the speed limits on most Interstate and state parkway highways to 70 mph (110 km/h). Prior to that, Kentucky was the only state along I-65 that had a maximum speed limit of 65 mph (105 km/h).

=== Indiana ===
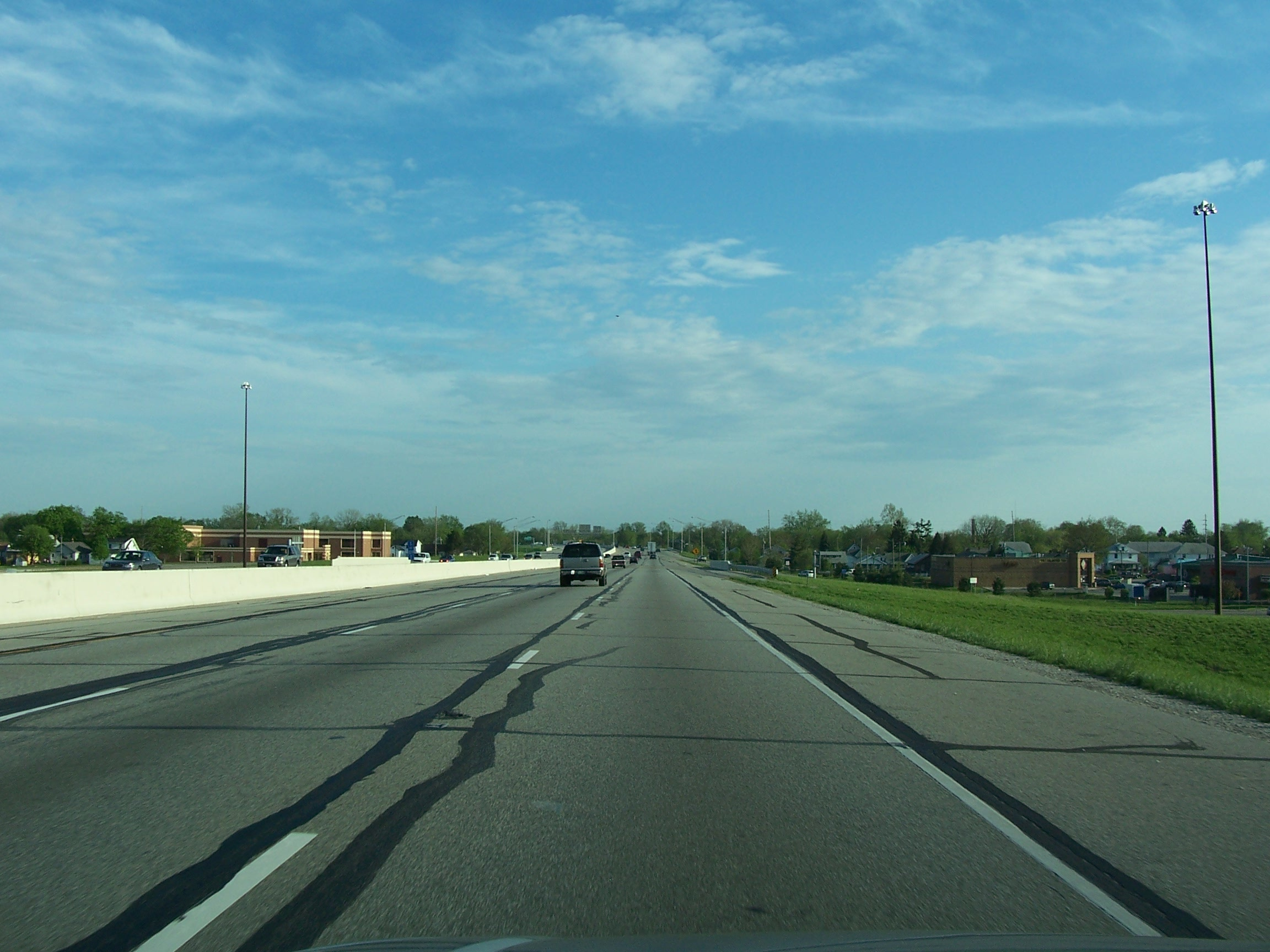
I-65 just outside Indianapolis, Indiana

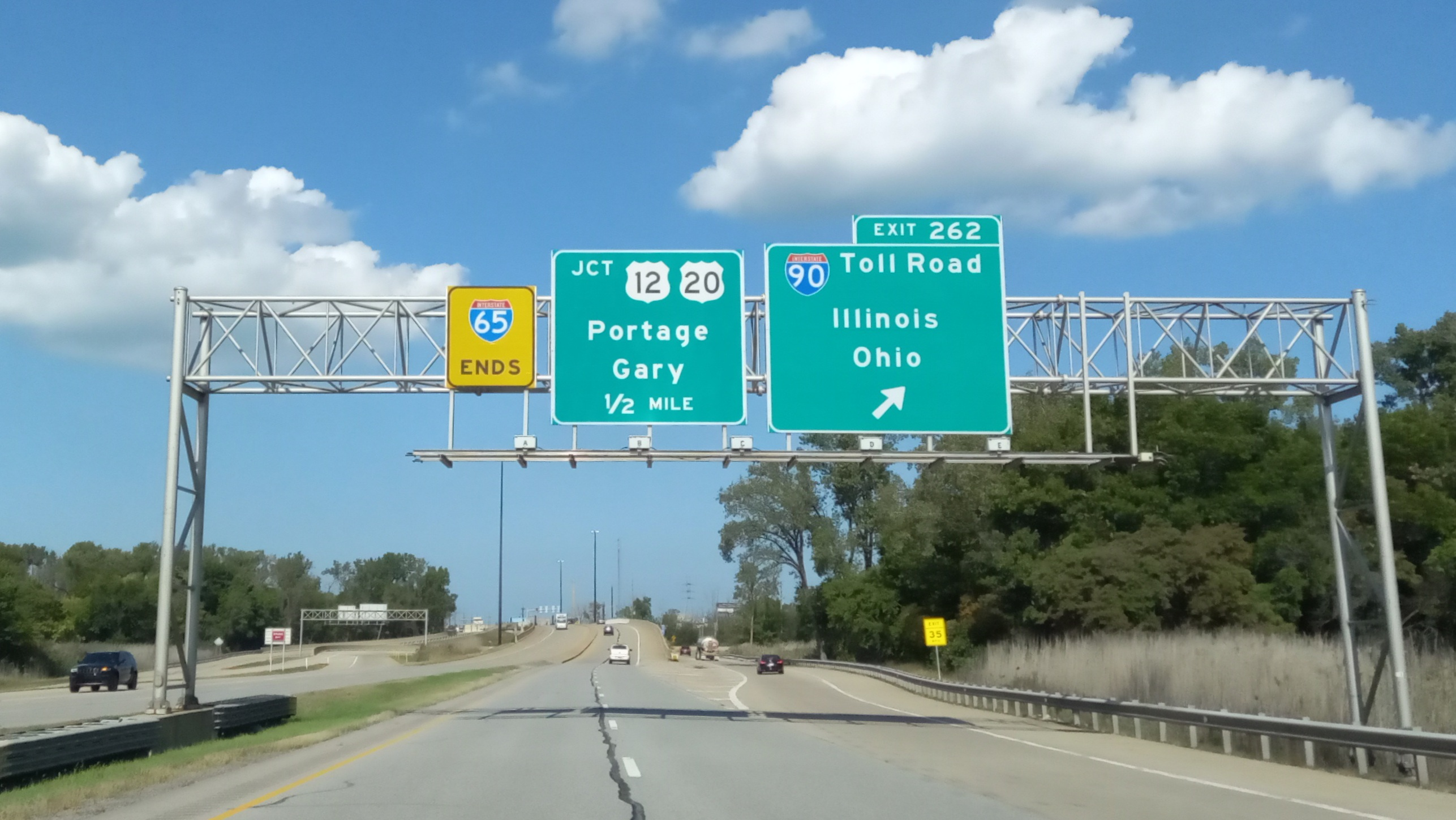
Approaching the northern terminus of I-65 in Gary, Indiana

I-65 enters Indiana at Jeffersonville and Clarksville. Miles 0–9 were rebuilt, widened, and realigned from north of Sellersburg to the Ohio River during 2008–2010, giving great traffic relief to the fast-growing Indiana suburbs of Louisville. Over 300,000 of the 1.5 million people in Louisville's CMSA live in its Indiana counties.

A section of I-65 in Downtown Indianapolis runs concurrently with I-70. The junctions are often referred to as the "North Split" and the "South Split", forming a section of Interstate locally known as the "Inner Loop" or "The Spaghetti Bowl" due to the visual complexity of the intersecting ramps and overpasses.

In mid-March 2007, a 6-mile (9.7 km) section of I-70 from the North Split to I-465 east of downtown was restricted to automobiles only for the "Super 70" project, a massive rebuild and expansion of that freeway. Trucks over 13 short tons (12 t) were forced to divert through I-65 if coming from the north and use the circular I-465 to the south to reconnect to I-70 eastbound. Westbound traffic from I-70 was required to loop north or south along I-465 to get to I-65 or I-70. The Super 70 project was completed in November 2007. In mid-2003, the portion of I-65 that runs concurrently with I-70 was closed to all traffic due to the "HyperFix" project. During that time, a new concrete surface was installed and the overpasses were upgraded.

In 1999, the 25-mile (40 km) segment of I-65 between the two I-465 interchanges was renamed the Kenneth "Babyface" Edmonds Highway.

North of Lafayette near Brookston, the road passes through the Meadow Lake Wind Farm for several miles, with the turbines and standards spaced out in order to avoid a collapse onto the highway. The Fowler Ridge Wind Farm is also visible on both sides of the highway.

From its crossing into Lake County over the Kankakee River to its northern terminus, the highway is known as the Casimir Pulaski Memorial Highway.

Prior to 2004, the northern terminus of I-65 was only 0.125 miles (0.201 km) north of the Indiana Toll Road (I-90). Traffic going from I-90 to I-65 had to stop at a traffic signal to make a left turn. Traffic from I-65 to I-90 bypassed the traffic signal via an isolated right-turn lane. In 2004, the interchange was fully grade-separated, so it is now one interchange involving I-65, I-90, US 12, and US 20, thereby eliminating a connection gap in the Interstate Highway System.

== History ==
The first section of Interstate 65 reused the Kentucky Turnpike, a toll road that opened on August 1, 1956. The first section of Interstate Highway in Tennessee constructed under the authorization of the Federal-Aid Highway Act of 1956 was a short section of I-65 which opened on November 15, 1958. The first section of Interstate Highway to be completed in Alabama was also a section of I-65, which opened on December 10, 1959. The first section of I-65 in Indiana was opened on September 14, 1960. Kentucky was the first state to complete its portion of I-65, with the last stretch opening on June 22, 1970. The final section in Tennessee opened on October 26, 1973. The last section in Indiana, part of the concurrent section with I-70 in Indianapolis, opened on October 15, 1976. I-65 was not officially completed until December 19, 1985, when a section north of Birmingham opened, replacing a four-lane stretch of US 31 that had been designated as part of I-65 but did not meet Interstate Highway standards.

I-65 lends its name to the I-65 Killer, also known as the Days Inn Killer (later identified as Harry Edward Greenwell), who committed at least three murders along I-65 in Indiana and Kentucky.

== Junction list ==
Alabama
I-10 in Mobile
US 90 in Mobile
US 98 in Mobile
US 45 in Prichard
I-165 in Prichard
US 43 north-northeast of Satsuma
US 84 west-southwest of Evergreen
US 31 on the Hope Hull–Montgomery line
Future I-85 in Montgomery
US 80 in Montgomery. The highways travel concurrently through Montgomery.
US 80 / US 82 in Montgomery. I-65/US 82 travels concurrently to Prattville.
I-85 / Future I-685 in Montgomery
US 31 north of Prattville
US 31 in Clanton
US 31 in Calera
US 31 in Alabaster
I-459 in Hoover
US 31 on the Hoover–Vestavia Hills city line
US 11 / US 78 in Birmingham
I-20 / I-59 in Birmingham
US 31 in Birmingham
I-22 in Fultondale
US 31 in Smoke Rise. The highways travel concurrently through Smoke Rise.
US 278 in Cullman
US 31 south-southeast of Lacon
I-565 on the Decatur–Huntsville city line
US 72 in Athens
US 31 in Athens. The highways travel concurrently to Ardmore, Tennessee.
Tennessee
US 64 west of Frankewing
US 412 in Columbia
I-840 near Franklin
I-440 in Nashville
I-40 in Nashville. The highways travel concurrently through Nashville.
US 70 / US 70S / US 431 in Nashville
US 70 in Nashville
I-24 in Nashville. The highways travel concurrently through Nashville.
US 431 in Nashville
US 31W / US 41 in Nashville
US 31W / US 41 in Goodlettsville
Kentucky
US 31W south-southeast of Franklin
I-165 in Bowling Green
US 231 in Bowling Green
US 68 in Oakland
US 31W in Munfordville
US 31W in Elizabethtown
US 62 in Elizabethtown
I-265 in Louisville
I-264 in Louisville
US 150 in Louisville
I-64 / I-71 north in Louisville
Indiana
US 31 in Jeffersonville. The highways travel concurrently to west of Jeffersonville.
I-265 in Clarksville
US 31 south-southeast of Crothersville
US 50 in Seymour
US 31 in Taylorsville
I-69 / I-74 / I-465 / US 31 / US 36 / US 40 in Indianapolis
I-70 in Indianapolis. The highways travel concurrently through Indianapolis.
I-465 in Indianapolis
I-865 east / US 52 north-northwest of Royalton. I-65/US 52 travels concurrently to Lebanon.
US 231 south of Wolcott
US 24 / US 231 east of Remington
US 231 north of Remington
US 231 south in Crown Point
US 30 in Merrillville
I-80 / I-94 / US 6 in Gary
I-90 in Gary
US 12 / US 20 in Gary

== Auxiliary routes ==
- I-165, a spur in Alabama that begins in Prichard and ends in Mobile.
- I-565, a spur in Alabama that begins in Decatur and ends in Huntsville.
- I-165, a spur in Kentucky that begins in Bowling Green and ends in Owensboro.
- I-265, the beltway around the Louisville area in Kentucky and Indiana. The highway is called the Gene Snyder freeway in Kentucky, and the Lee H. Hamilton Highway in Indiana between I-65 and the Lewis and Clark Bridge connecting Indiana and Kentucky on the eastern side of Louisville.
- I-465, a full beltway around Indianapolis.
- I-865, a connection between I-65 and I-465 on the northwest side of Indianapolis, formerly numbered I-465.

== See also ==
- Ohio River Bridges Project
- Super Bowl XLI, dubbed the "I-65 Bowl" due to the proximity of the competing teams' cities (Indianapolis and Chicago) to I-65
