= U.S. Route 31 =

Highway in the United States

U.S. Route 31
- US 31 highlighted in red; US 31E/31W split in orange

Route information
- Length: 1,280 mi (2,060 km)
- Existed: 11 November 1926–present

Major junctions
- South end: US 90 / US 98 in Spanish Fort, AL
- I-65 near Birmingham, AL; I-20 / I-59 in Birmingham, AL; I-22 near Fultondale, AL; I-24 in Nashville, TN; I-40 in Nashville, TN; I-64 / I-65 in Louisville, KY; I-465 / I-65 / I-69 / I-70 / I-74 / US 36 / US 40 in Indianapolis, IN; I-80 / I-90 in South Bend, IN; I-94 near Benton Harbor, MI; I-96 in Norton Shores, MI
- North end: I-75 near Mackinaw City, MI

Location
- Country: United States
- States: Alabama, Tennessee, Kentucky, Indiana, Michigan

Highway system
- United States Numbered Highway System; List; Special; Divided
← US 30	→ US 32

U.S. Route 31 or U.S. Highway 31 (US 31) is a major north–south U.S. highway connecting southern Alabama to northern Michigan. Its southern terminus is at an intersection with US 90/US 98 in Spanish Fort, Alabama. Its northern terminus is at an interchange with Interstate 75 (I-75) south of Mackinaw City, Michigan.

US 31 once crossed the Straits of Mackinac by car ferry to intersect US 2 north of St. Ignace, Michigan, in the Upper Peninsula and then formerly reached Mackinaw City along the southern approaches of the Mackinac Bridge (which has been taken over by I-75). It also formerly entered downtown Mobile, Alabama, via a long bridge over Mobile Bay.

The southern segment of US 31 connects the cities of Mobile, Montgomery, Birmingham, and Decatur in Alabama, and Nashville in Tennessee. The northern segment of US 31 connects Louisville in Kentucky, and Indianapolis in Indiana. From Nashville to Louisville, US 31 is signed U.S. Route 31W and U.S. Route 31E. From the Mobile Bay area in Alabama to Indianapolis, US 31 travels parallel to Interstate 65 (I-65).

== Route description ==
=== Alabama ===
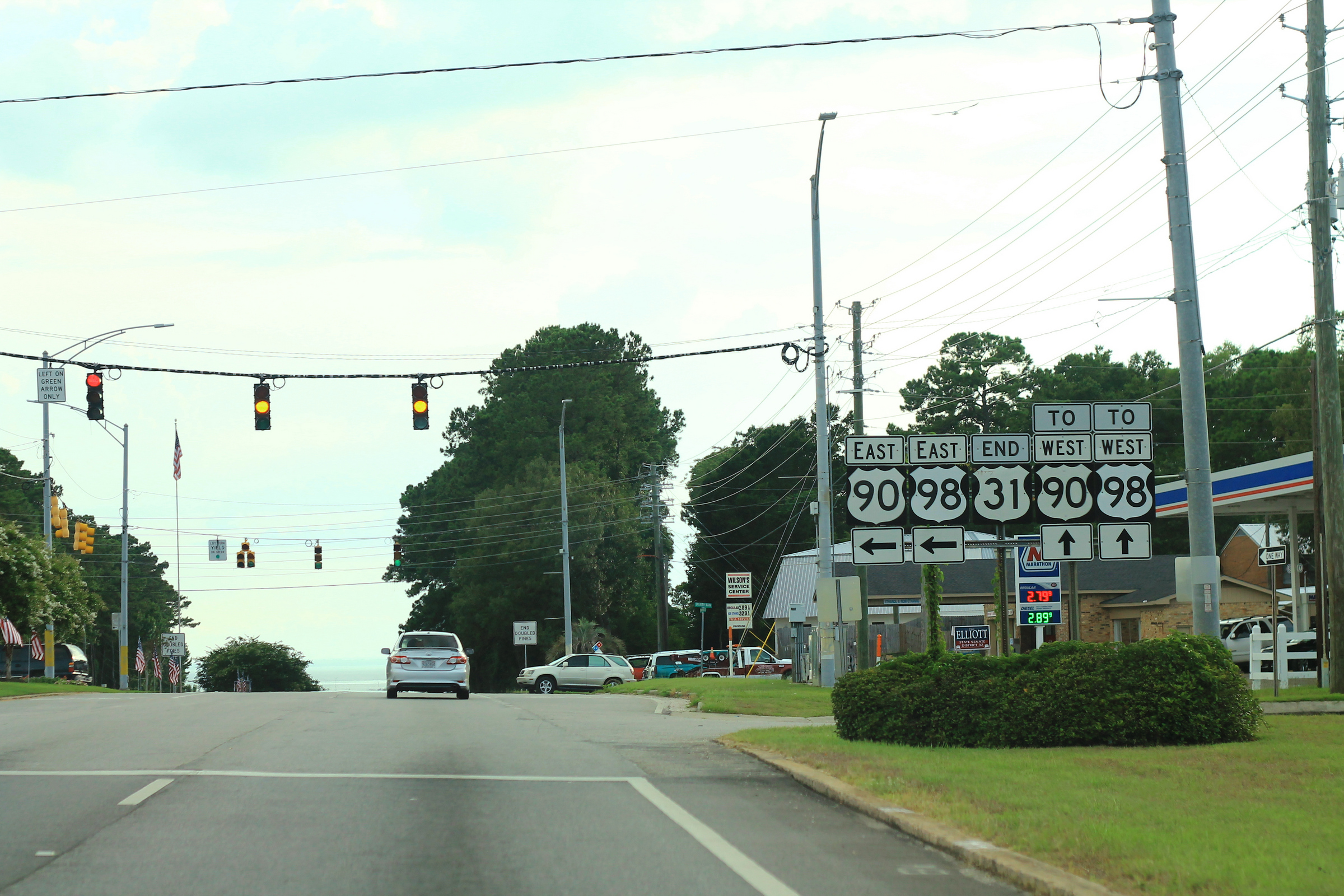
Southern terminus of US 31 in Spanish Fort, AL

US 31 begins in Spanish Fort, Alabama, at a junction with US 90 and 98. Formerly, the route originated in Mobile, co-routed with US 90 and 98. Whereas Interstate 65 leaves the Mobile Metropolitan Area via a route on the west side of the city, US 31 leaves the Mobile area via a route on the eastern side of the metro area, passing through Bay Minette. I-65 has effectively replaced US 31 as the preferred route for through traffic, making US 31 a local connecting route.

Near Atmore, the route passes extremely close to the Florida panhandle's extreme northwestern corner, missing by approximately 1000 feet.

At Flomaton, US 31 begins a 15-mile virtual east–west concurrency with US 29 that continues to Brewton. North of Brewton, US 31 assumes a northeast–southwest trajectory, passing through rural areas and small towns in Escambia and Conecuh Counties. In Evergreen, US 31 north and US 84 share a brief concurrency heading north and east out of town.

Although US 31 parallels Interstate 65 throughout Alabama, the two routes do not directly junction each other until they reach Pintlala in southern Montgomery County, which is 164 miles north of Mobile. The two routes do not junction each other again for another 22 miles. US 31 is routed along a bypass of Montgomery, the state capital. At Prattville, this route intersects U.S. Route 82.

North of Prattville, US 31 passes through rural areas of Autauga and Chilton Counties, primarily along two-lane roadways. Between Prattville and Alabaster, US 31 has three interchanges with I-65.

Between Saginaw and Warrior, US 31 is routed along multi-laned routes as it passes through the Birmingham-Hoover Metropolitan Area. It passes through suburbs such as Alabaster, Pelham, Hoover and Vestavia Hills. In Homewood, US 31 merges with U.S. Route 280 and is routed along the Elton B. Stephens Expressway, a 2.6-mile limited access highway that connects the south suburbs with downtown Birmingham. US 31 and 280 are co-routed until the expressway junctions I-20/ 59 just northeast of downtown. This interchange serves as the western terminus of US 280, and north of the interchange US 31 is routed along surface streets as it proceeds northwardly out of Birmingham.

US 31 continues to be routed along multi-lane streets and highways as it continues north of Birmingham, meeting the eastern terminus of I-22 just south of Fultondale, and passing through the small town, along with Gardendale, Morris and Kimberly, also closely paralleling I-65. At Warrior, the roadway shrinks to two lanes. Two miles north of Warrior, US 31 and I-65 begin a three-mile concurrency between the interstate route's Exits 284 and 287. The interstate route was constructed over US 31's roadway through this segment.

Between the split from I-65 and Garden City, US 31 is routed along a narrow two-lane route. North of Garden City, and passing through Cullman, Hartselle, Decatur and Athens, it is routed along multi-lane and often divided roadways.

At Athens, I-65 and US 31 begin a concurrency that continues to just north of the Tennessee state line. In both states, US 31 is largely unsigned.

In addition to junctions previously cited, US 31 junctions U.S. Route 80 in Montgomery, Interstate 459 in Hoover, U.S. Route 78 in Birmingham, U.S. Route 278 in Cullman, U.S. Route 72 Alternate in Decatur, and U.S. Route 72 in Athens.

Given US 31's former importance as a major connecting route in Alabama, in several cities it is known by the name of the city it leads to. For example, south of Montgomery it is still named Mobile Highway, and northwardly it is referred to as the Birmingham Highway. Similarly, south of Birmingham it is referred to as Montgomery Highway, and northwardly it is referred to as the Decatur Highway. Throughout north Alabama plaques and signage refer to the route as the Beeline Highway.

US 31 is co-routed with unsigned State Route 3 (SR 3) throughout the state until its junction with I-65 north of Athens.

=== Tennessee ===
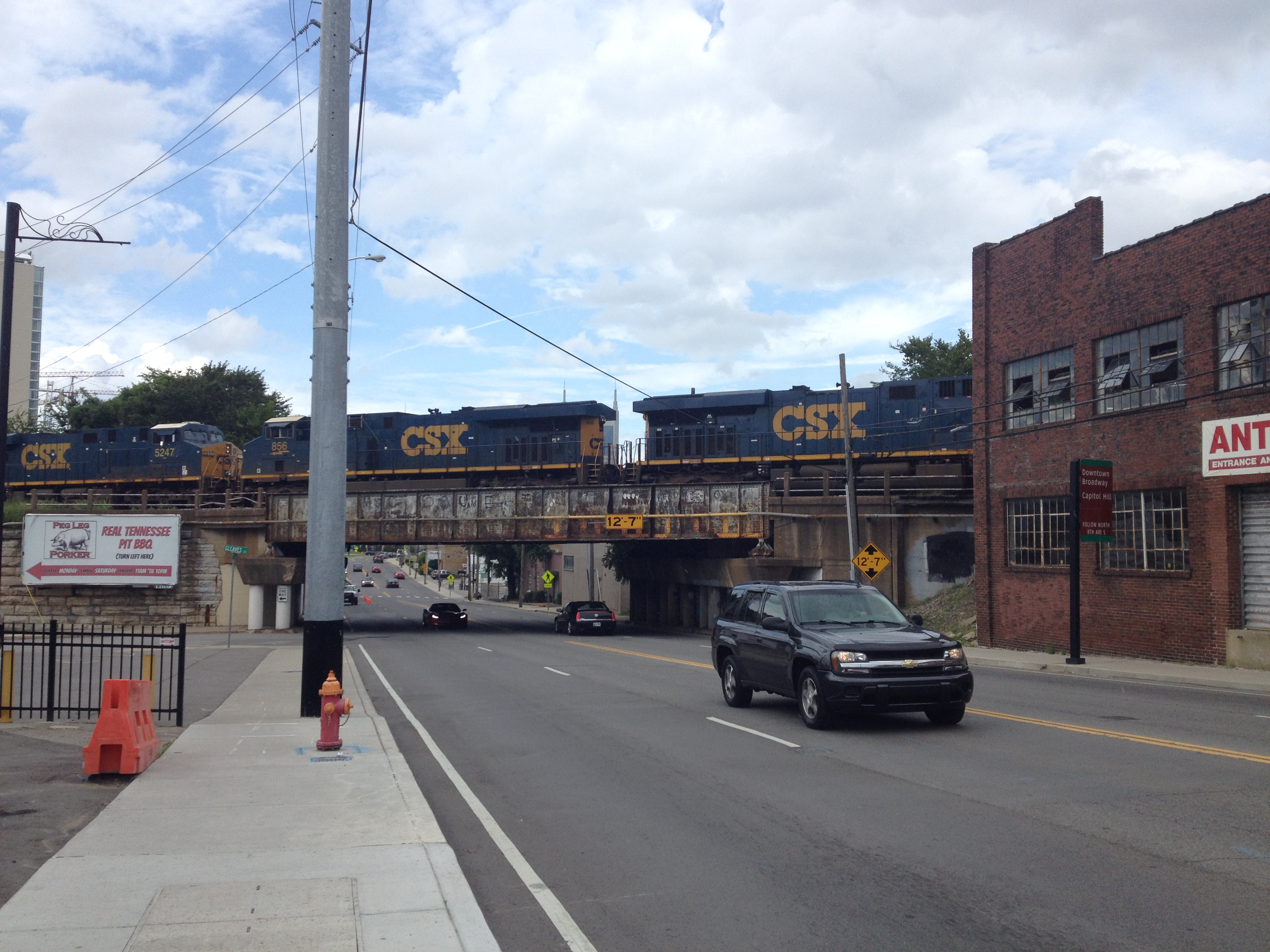
US 31 northbound on 8th Avenue in Nashville

The first mile in Tennessee, US 31 runs concurrently with I-65, somewhat parallel to which it runs until it splits in downtown Nashville, to become US 31W and US 31E, a relatively uncommon occurrence in U.S. Highways, though not unlike that which occurs to US 49 and US 45 in Mississippi, U.S. Route 19 in North Carolina and Tennessee, and US 11 in Tennessee.

While upon crossing the state line from Alabama into Tennessee, US 31 (also State Route 7 [SR 7] at this point) runs to the east of I-65, it crosses over I-65, changing names from Main Street to Elkton Pike on the overpass. According to this name change, US 31 runs through Elkton shortly after making this crossing.

After passing through Elkton, US 31 wanders, away from I-65, towards the city of Pulaski. On its way to Pulaski, US 31 intersects with US 64 and does so once again in the center of the city. In Pulaski, US 31 serves as 1st Street in the downtown area. Just north of the downtown area of Pulaski, US 31 Alternate (US 31A) branches off US 31, serving first as East Grigsby Street, then as Lewisburg Highway, never to be visible from US 31 again until reaching downtown Nashville.

Continuing north, US 31 meanders, following Richland Creek for a portion of the way, named Columbia Highway; naturally, as follows the typical naming trend for former connecting routes, halfway to Columbia, the name changes to Pulaski Highway. US 31 runs by Lynnville in this process.

As US 31 enters Columbia, upon crossing James Campbell Boulevard (also SR 50), it is named Carmack Boulevard, at this point a decently wide road with two lanes on each side. While in Columbia, US 31 changes names two more times, once to South Garden Street (also temporarily sharing routes with US 412 and SR 99 in this area), and then to Nashville Highway while SR 7 departs from the street. It is a short stretch until US 31 hits an intersection with Bear Creek Pike. This is the northern terminus of US 43, and also the point at which US 412/SR 99 resumes its eastern trajectory, away from US 31. US 31 also picks up the path of SR 6 here, in addition to the historical significance of being the former warpath of the Confederate forces during 1863 and 1864, during the American Civil War.

Upon leaving Columbia, US 31 develops a median and a speed limit not too dissimilar from that on I-65, which is still only a few miles to the east of the highway. On the way up to Spring Hill, US 31 passes straight through a small, corner town little-known to be called Neapolis. At this location, there is an on-ramp onto Saturn Pkwy (SR 396), named as such because it was once a highway connecting I-65 to the assembly plant belonging to Saturn Corporation, which no longer acts independently from its parent company, General Motors. No more than two miles further up the highway, Saturn Pkwy has looped back around to begin its trajectory toward I-65, and there are more on and off ramps between SR 396 and US 31.

At this point, US 31 returns to its original two-lane, narrow road format, and has entered the rapidly-growing city of Spring Hill, where it serves as Main Street, then as Columbia Pike in the adjacent Thompson's Station.

North of Thompson's Station, US 31 intersects I-840, serving as exit 28 for the southern loop around Nashville. Further up the highway, US 31 shares an interchange with Goose Creek Pike, a direct route to I-65. US 31 continues up through historic Franklin, as Columbia Avenue. In the middle of Franklin, US 31 comes to a five-point intersection with the routes of US 431 and SR 96, and a roundabout two blocks further north which continues the route of SR 96 to the east. US 31 then proceeds out of Franklin and to the northeast.

As US 31 passes through Brentwood, the road widens, again to two lanes per side, and intersects with SR 254 at the point where it reaches less than a half of a mile from I-65 once again. At this point, US 31 remains within this distance from I-65 until reaching its split in downtown Nashville, traveling through the sites of the Battle of Franklin and the Battle of Nashville in the process.

Entering Nashville, US 31 first shares an interchange with SR 155 (at this point Thompson Lane / Woodmont Boulevard), and, immediately afterwards, travels under an interchange between I-65 and I-440. After passing through Berry Hill, US 31 yet again travels under an interchange, this time between I-65 and I-40. Then, US 31 reaches another roundabout, where it intersects with US41, US 31A, and US 70S. Going through Nashville, US 31 retains several names: 8th Avenue South, Rosa L Parks Boulevard, James Robertson Pkwy, and 4th Avenue North, respectively as US 31 progresses northward. After making a semi-circle, crossing the Cumberland River, and passing under I-24, US 31 makes the split into US 31W and US 31E.

=== Kentucky ===
US 31E stays east of I-65, passing through Glasgow and Bardstown. It enters Louisville from the southeast, where it is named Bardstown Road for most of its length in the city, while US 31W closely follows I-65 from the Tennessee state line, through Bowling Green, to Elizabethtown. From here, it diverges to the west and passes through Fort Knox. North of Fort Knox, US 31W joins with US 60 in Kentucky and it roughly follows the Ohio River into Louisville. In southwestern Louisville, US 31W is called Dixie Highway. It is the major commercial street in this area.

In Downtown Louisville at Second Street, US 31E and US 31W rejoin to form US 31 and immediately crosses the Ohio River on the Clark Memorial Bridge only traveling 0.912 miles (1.468 km) before the route crosses into Indiana.

=== Indiana ===
US 31 travels concurrently with I-65 in Jeffersonville, after having crossed the Ohio River from Kentucky. It splits off north of Jeffersonville at Clarksville and proceeds to Indianapolis. At I-465 on the south side of Indianapolis, US 31 is now routed onto I-465 on the east side of the city. US 31 exits I-465 in extreme southern Hamilton County, and continues northward. US 31 then passes through or near Carmel, Kokomo, Rochester, Plymouth and Lakeville, often following a historic Native American trail to what was once a French fur-trading outpost on Mackinac Island and later the British Fort Holmes. As it passes Potato Creek State Park and approaches southern South Bend, US 31 travels concurrently with US 20 in Indiana and proceeds west then northward on the St. Joseph Valley Parkway, bypassing South Bend and proceeding into Michigan.

=== Michigan ===
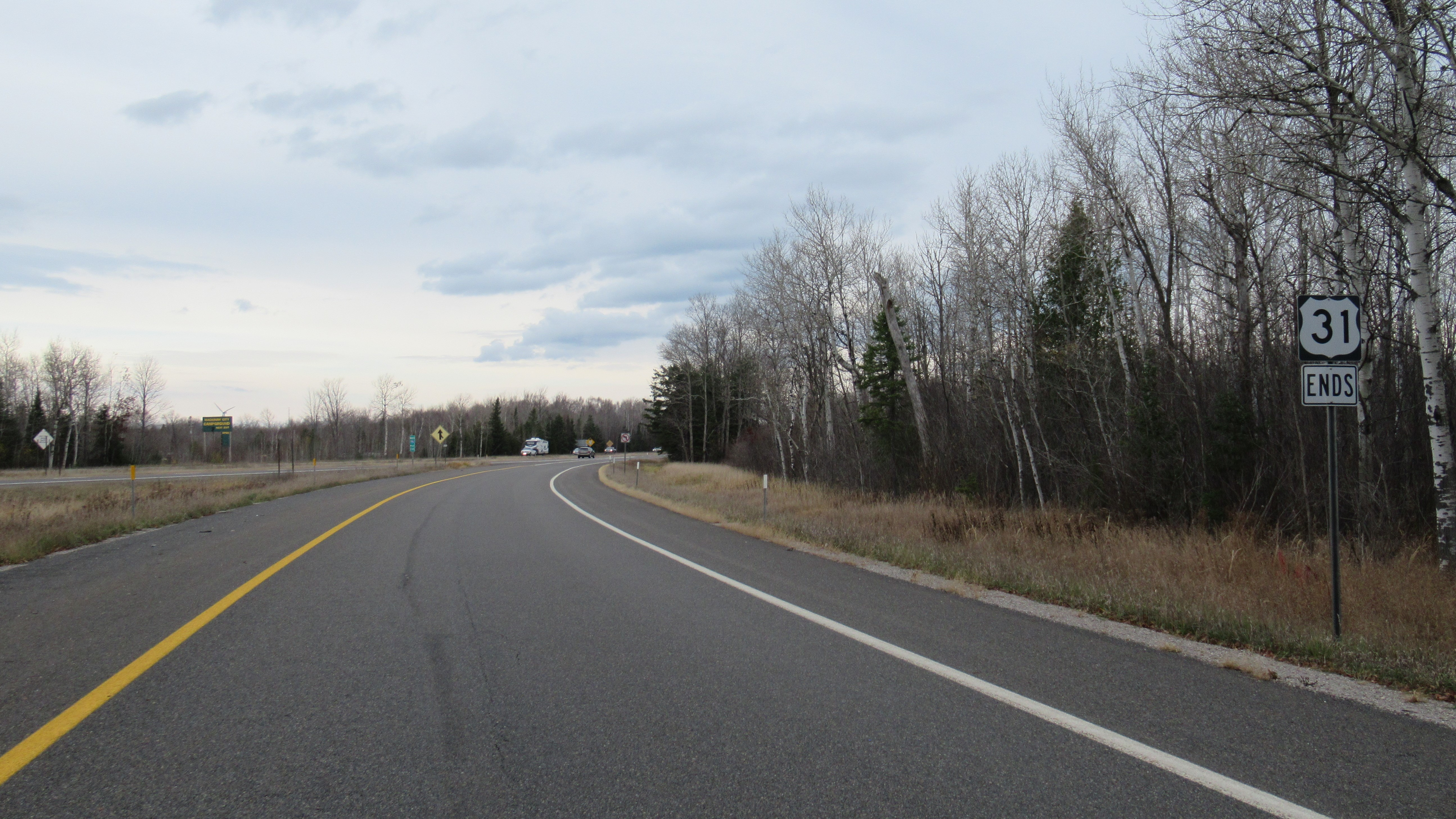
Northern terminus of US 31 in Mackinaw Township

US 31 follows the St. Joseph Valley Parkway northward into southern Michigan to an interchange with I-94 near Benton Harbor–St. Joseph, then runs concurrently north to I-196. US 31 then runs concurrently with I-196 along the shore of Lake Michigan north to the Holland area. US 31 departs from I-196 as a divided highway with many Michigan lefts north to Grand Haven, where it becomes a freeway again. This freeway continues northward through the Muskegon area until Ludington, where the freeway ends and US 31 turns east concurrently with US 10 to Scottville before turning northward again toward Manistee.

At Beulah, US 31 runs eastward into Grand Traverse County. South of Traverse City, US 31 turns northward along M-37, running concurrently into the city. Next to Grand Traverse Bay, US 31/M-37 turns easterly along M-72; the three highways run together along the bay before separating. M-37 turns northward up the Old Mission Peninsula, and M-72 turns easterly at Acme. US 31 continues northward along the eastern shore of Grand Traverse Bay, running eastward through Charlevoix and along Little Traverse Bay into Petoskey. There, US 31 intersects the northern end of US 131 before rounding the bay and heading northward and inland toward Mackinaw City. US 31 ends at a directional interchange with I-75 south of Mackinaw City.

== History ==
In the 1930s, US 31 continued from St. Ignace across the Straits of Mackinac, and intersected US 2 (Mackinac Trail and what later became M-123).

Before the Interstate era, US 31 was a major north–south highway. I-65 supplanted US 31 and either US 31W or US 31E as a through route between Mobile and Indianapolis. South of Indianapolis, all segments of US 31 not traveling concurrently with I-65 have been reduced to roads largely of local use. I-196 now carries the route of US 31 between Holland, and St. Joseph, Michigan. All of US 31 between Indianapolis and Ludington, Michigan, is divided highway—some of it is freeway, including a bypass route of South Bend, Indiana. The segment between Indianapolis and South Bend is scheduled for upgrade or replacement with Interstate-standard freeway. Environmental impact studies have shown that the fifth phase of the then-to-be-constructed freeway segment between Napier Avenue near Benton Harbor, Michigan, and I-94 would be completed in mid-November 2022; the segment officially opened on November 9.

The portion of I-75 north of US 31's northern terminus toward the Mackinac Bridge was designated part of US 31 prior to the 1990s and was US 31's northernmost portion to be built to freeway status. Since its truncation at the I-75 interchange, however, the northernmost segment of the US 31 freeway ends near Ludington.

Until 1975, the split of US 31 into US 31E and US 31W took place in Sellersburg, Indiana about 10 miles (16 km) north of its current split at the Kentucky end of the Clark Memorial Bridge.

In Alabama, US 31 follows portions of the Pulaski Pike beginning at the Alabama–Tennessee State line at Ardmore, and was originally routed on what is now called Alabama State Route 251 (SR-251). It follows roughly along the Decatur Stage Road to the site of Rhodes Ferry in Decatur, and also intersected and follows portions of the Stouts Road to Birmingham. From Birmingham, it follows portions of the Columbiana Road and roughly parallels it in Hoover along the present widened route and intersects with the Ashville-Montevallo Road or the Cahaba Trail (SR-119) and follows it on a branch to Calera. US 31, beginning in Chilton County, follows a branch of the Talladega-Montgomery Stage Road, a road that went from Talladega and went south from Columbiana to near present-day Clanton, Verbena, and Montgomery, and was operated by Jemison, Ficklin, & Powell, who operated stagecoaches on the road. US 31 in Prattville came to the site of Reese's Ferry on the Alabama River, where it was replaced by the present bridge near Prattville. From Montgomery, US 31 follows parts of the Federal Road, and is presently routed on the Greenville Branch of the Federal Road, and follows the Montgomery-Mobile Road through Conecuh, and Escambia Counties and also intersects with the Pensacola Trading Path or the "Old Wolf Trail" from Burnt Corn.

At its southern end, US 31 originally traveled further west than it currently does, passing through Spanish Fort, Alabama. It crossed Mobile Bay via several narrow bridges, including the Admiral Raphael Semmes Bridge, a drawbridge spanning the Tensaw River. It turned north along the east bank of the Mobile River, crossing the river into Plateau, over the former Cochrane Bridge, another old drawbridge where the current Cochrane–Africatown USA Bridge is now located. It then turned south to end at US 90. It now officially ends at US 98 in Spanish Fort.

== Major intersections ==
Southern segment

Alabama
US 90 / US 98 in Spanish Fort
US 29 in Flomaton. The highways travel concurrently to Brewton.
US 84 southwest of Evergreen. The highways travel concurrently to east of Evergreen.
I-65 on the Hope Hull-Montgomery line
US 80 in Montgomery.
US 82 in Prattville
I-65 north of Prattville
I-65 in Clanton
I-65 in Calera
I-65 in Alabaster
I-459 in Hoover
I-65 on the Hoover-Vestavia Hills city line
US 280 in Homewood. The highways travel concurrently to Birmingham.
US 78 in Birmingham
US 11 in Birmingham
I-20 / I-59 / US 280 in Birmingham
I-22 near Fultondale
I-65 in Birmingham
I-65 in Smoke Rise. The highways travel concurrently through the town.
US 278 in Cullman
I-65 south-southeast of Lacon
US 72 in Athens
I-65 in Athens. The highways travel concurrently to Ardmore, Tennessee.
Tennessee
US 64 in Pulaski
US 31A in Pulaski
US 412 in Columbia
US 43 in Columbia
I-840 in Thompson's Station
US 431 in Franklin. The highways travel concurrently through the city.
US 41 / US 70S / US 31A in Nashville. US 31A joins US 41 and US 70S to intersect with US 31. US 41 and US 70S travel concurrently through the city.
US 70 / US 70S / US 431 in Nashville. US 31/US 431 travels concurrently through the city.
US 31E / US 31W / US 41 / US 431 in Nashville

Northern segment

Kentucky
US 31E / US 31W / US 60 in Louisville
Indiana
I-65 in Jeffersonville. The highways travel concurrently to west of Jeffersonville.
I-65 south-southeast of Crothersville
US 50 in Seymour
I-65 in Taylorsville
I-69 / I-74 / I-465 / US 36 / US 40 in Indianapolis. I-69/I-74/US 31/US 36/US 40 travels concurrently through the city. I-465/US 31 travels concurrently to Carmel.
I-65 in Indianapolis
I-74 / US 421 in Indianapolis. US 31/US 421 travels concurrently to Carmel.
US 52 in Indianapolis. The highways travel concurrently to Carmel.
I-70 in Indianapolis
I-69 / SR 37 in Indianapolis
I-465 / US 52 / US 421 in Carmel
SR 931 north south of Kokomo. SR 931 picks back up with US 31 north of US 35
US 35 north in Kokomo. The highways travel concurrently to north-northeast of Kokomo.
US 35 south / SR 22 in Kokomo
US 24 in Peru
US 30 east of Plymouth
US 6 southeast of La Paz
US 20 in South Bend. The highways travel concurrently to west of the city.
I-80 / I-90 in South Bend
Michigan
US 12 in Bertrand Township
I-94 in Benton Township. The highways travel concurrently through the township.
I-196 in Benton Township. I-196/US 31 travels concurrently to Laketown Township.
I-96 in Norton Shores
US 10 in Amber Township. The highways travel concurrently through the township.
US 131 in Petoskey
I-75 in Mackinaw Township

== See also ==
- St. Joseph Valley Parkway

Browse numbered routes
← KY 30	list	→ KY 32
