= Lacon, Alabama =

- Ghost town
- Location within Alabama Location within the United States
- Coordinates: 34°20′05″N 86°54′12″W
- Country: United States
- State: Alabama
- County: Morgan
- Named for: Lacon, Illinois
- Elevation: 597 ft (182 m)
- Time zone: UTC-6 (Central (CST))
  - Summer (DST): UTC-5 (CDT)
- Area code: 256
- GNIS feature ID: 151974

Lacon /ˈleɪ.kən/ , also known as Cedar Crossing, is a ghost town in extreme southern Morgan County, Alabama, United States. Lacon was named after Lacon, Illinois. Built at the northern foot of Burleson Mountain, alongside the railroad track there, a spring and good clay enabled a substantial brickyard. The Lacon brickyard made bricks with a distinctive mark, "LACON", imprinted on the large sides of the bricks.

After the brickyard closed and a new highway bypassed the town, the village practically disappeared with services being assumed by the nearby town of Falkville. The Lacon site was reborn by the 1970s as a large weekend flea market, Lacon Trade Day. Exit 318 of Interstate 65 is the "Lacon" exit and is less than one mile south of the old town site and present day flea market. A "lagoon" alongside U.S. Highway 31 and Trade Day is said to be a legacy of digging clay for the brick factory. A post office operated under the name Lacon from 1891 to 1955.

The CSX railroad maintains a 'helper' engine on a siding immediately south of Lacon. It is used to push (assist on the rear) southbound trains through Holmes Gap and over Sand Mountain, a sandstone ridge.
