= Kirkland, Williamson County, Tennessee =

Kirkland, Tennessee
- Unincorporated community
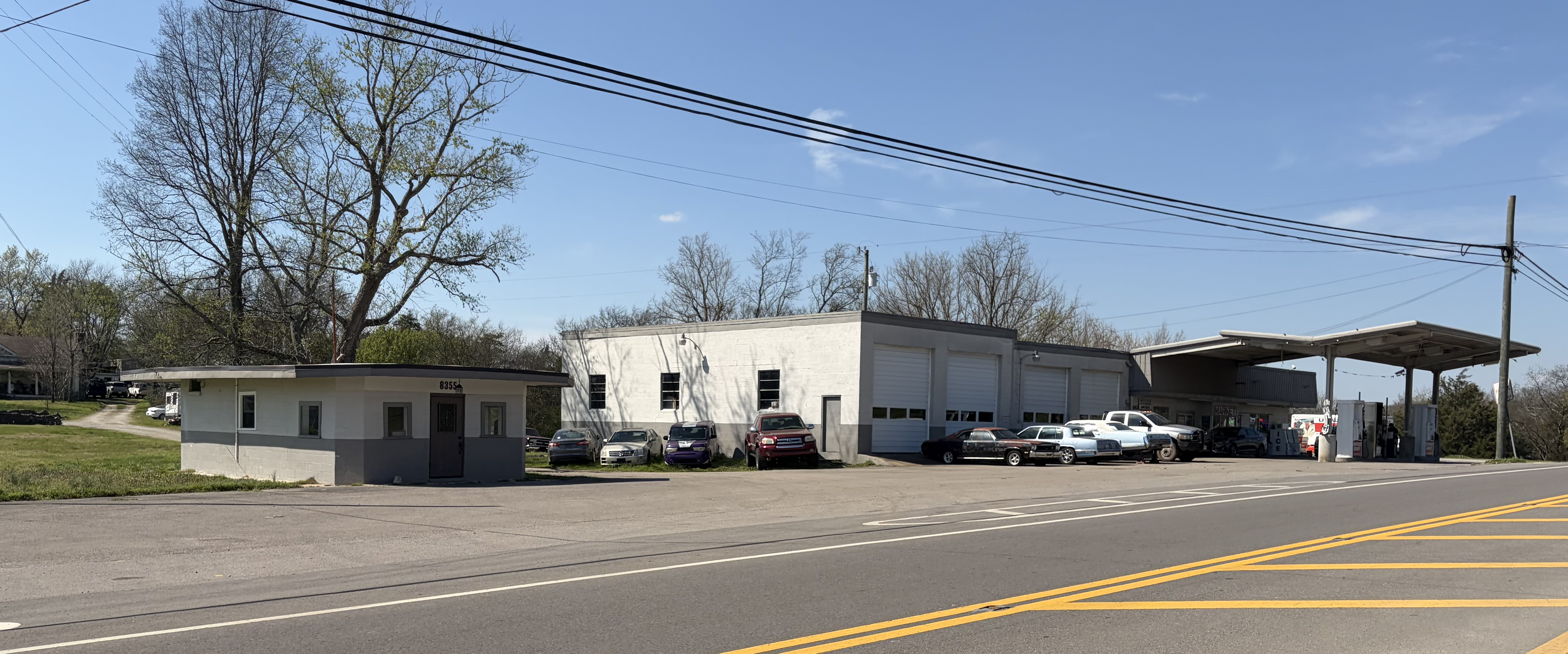
- Buildings in Kirkland

- Location within Tennessee Location within the United States
- Coordinates: 35°48′26″N 86°39′46″W
- Country: United States
- State: Tennessee
- County: Williamson
- Elevation: 745 ft (227 m)
- Time zone: UTC-6 (Central (CST))
  - Summer (DST): UTC-5 (CDT)
- Area code: 615
- GNIS feature ID: 1290299

Kirkland is an unincorporated community in Williamson County, Tennessee. Kirkland is located on U.S. Route 31A and U.S. Route 41A, 14 miles (23 km) southeast of Franklin.
