= Unionville, Tennessee =

Unionville
- CDP
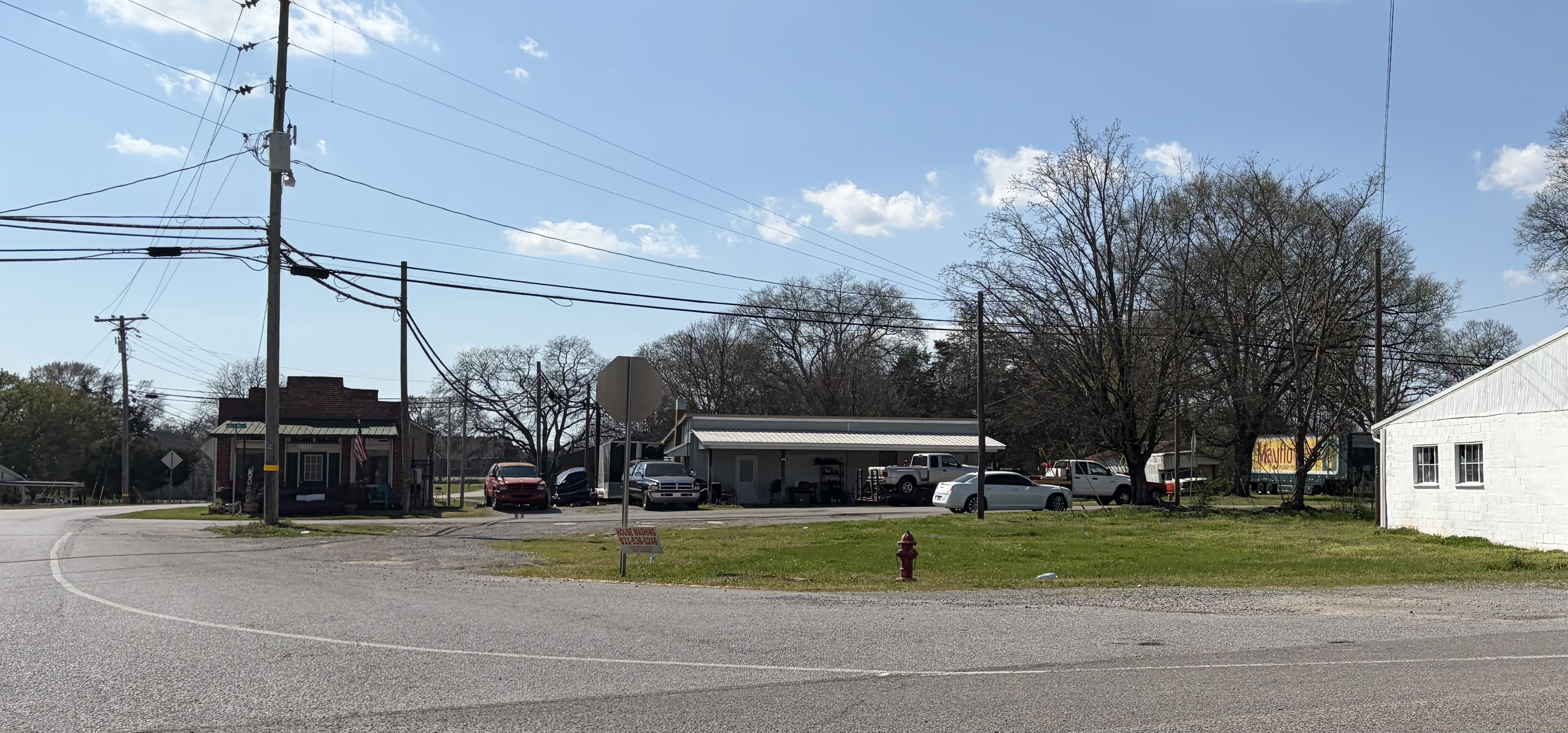
- Unionville in 2026

- Location within Tennessee Location within the United States
- Coordinates: 35°37′18″N 86°35′33″W
- Country: United States
- State: Tennessee
- County: Bedford

Area
  - Total: 9.03 sq mi (23.39 km^{2})
  - Land: 9.03 sq mi (23.39 km^{2})
  - Water: 0 sq mi (0.00 km^{2})
- Elevation: 722 ft (220 m)

Population (2020)
  - Total: 1,394
  - Density: 154.3/sq mi (59.59/km^{2})
- Time zone: UTC-6 (Central (CST))
  - Summer (DST): UTC-5 (CDT)
- ZIP code: 37180
- Area code: 931
- GNIS feature ID: 1273262

Unionville is an unincorporated community and census-designated place (CDP) in Bedford County, Tennessee. Its population was 1,394 as of the 2020 census. Unionville has a post office with ZIP code 37180.

Historical population
Census	Pop.	Note	%±
2010	1,368		—
2020	1,394		1.9%
U.S. Decennial Census

== History ==
Unionville was platted in 1827, and named for the fact two rival settlements merged with the new name. A post office has been in operation at Unionville since 1837.

== Education ==
Unionville contains three Bedford County public schools, the Community Elementary School (kindergarten to grade 5), the Community Middle School (grades 6 to 8), and Community High School (grades 9 to 12).

== Notable person ==
The community was the birthplace of Tennessee governor Jim Nance McCord, born in 1879.
