= Richland Creek (Tennessee) =

Location
- Country: United States
- State: Tennessee

Physical characteristics
- Mouth
  - location: Elk River
  - coordinates: 35°01′40″N 86°55′44″W

Richland Creek is a stream in Tennessee. It is a tributary of the Elk River. It runs from Maury County, Tennessee, to Giles County, Tennessee, past Pulaski and flows into the Elk River below the border between Tennessee and Alabama. This is one of at least five streams by the name of "Richland Creek" in various regions of Tennessee.

== Other "Richland Creeks" in Tennessee ==
- Richland Creek (Nashville, Tennessee) – a stream in the western part of Nashville, Tennessee, in Davidson County that flows into the Cumberland River.
- A tributary of the Tennessee River in Rhea County (northeast of Chattanooga).
- A northern branch of the Holston River, about 20 miles northeast of Knoxville, flowing by the town of Rutledge in Grainger County.
- An eastern tributary of the Tennessee River in Humphreys County, about 70 miles west of Nashville.
