= Tennessee State Route 106 =

State highway in Tennessee, United States

State Route 106

Route information
- Maintained by TDOT

Location
- Country: United States
- State: Tennessee

Highway system
- Tennessee State Routes; Interstate; US; State
← SR 105	→ SR 107

State Route 106 (SR 106) is a north–south state highway in Middle Tennessee. The highway is a secret, or hidden, designation for the following highways:

- U.S. Route 31A at Lewisburg
- U.S. Route 431 in Tennessee from Lewisburg to Nashville

State Route 106 begins as a secondary highway until after its concurrency with SR 96 in Frankin, where the rest of the route is a primary highway.

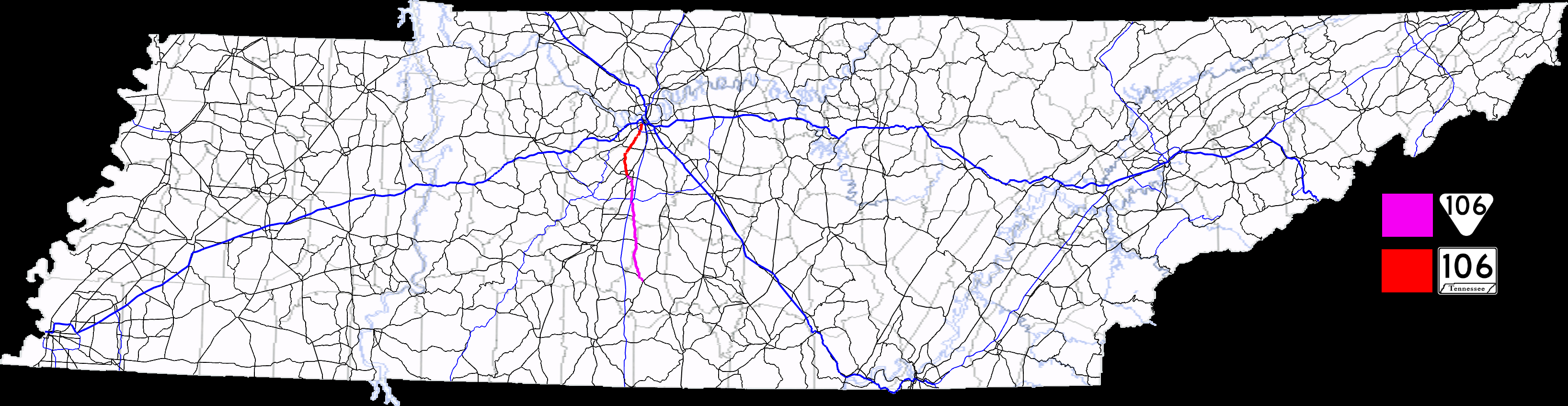
SR 106 highlighted in Pink (Secondary) and Red (Primary)
