= Belfast, Tennessee =

- Unincorporated community
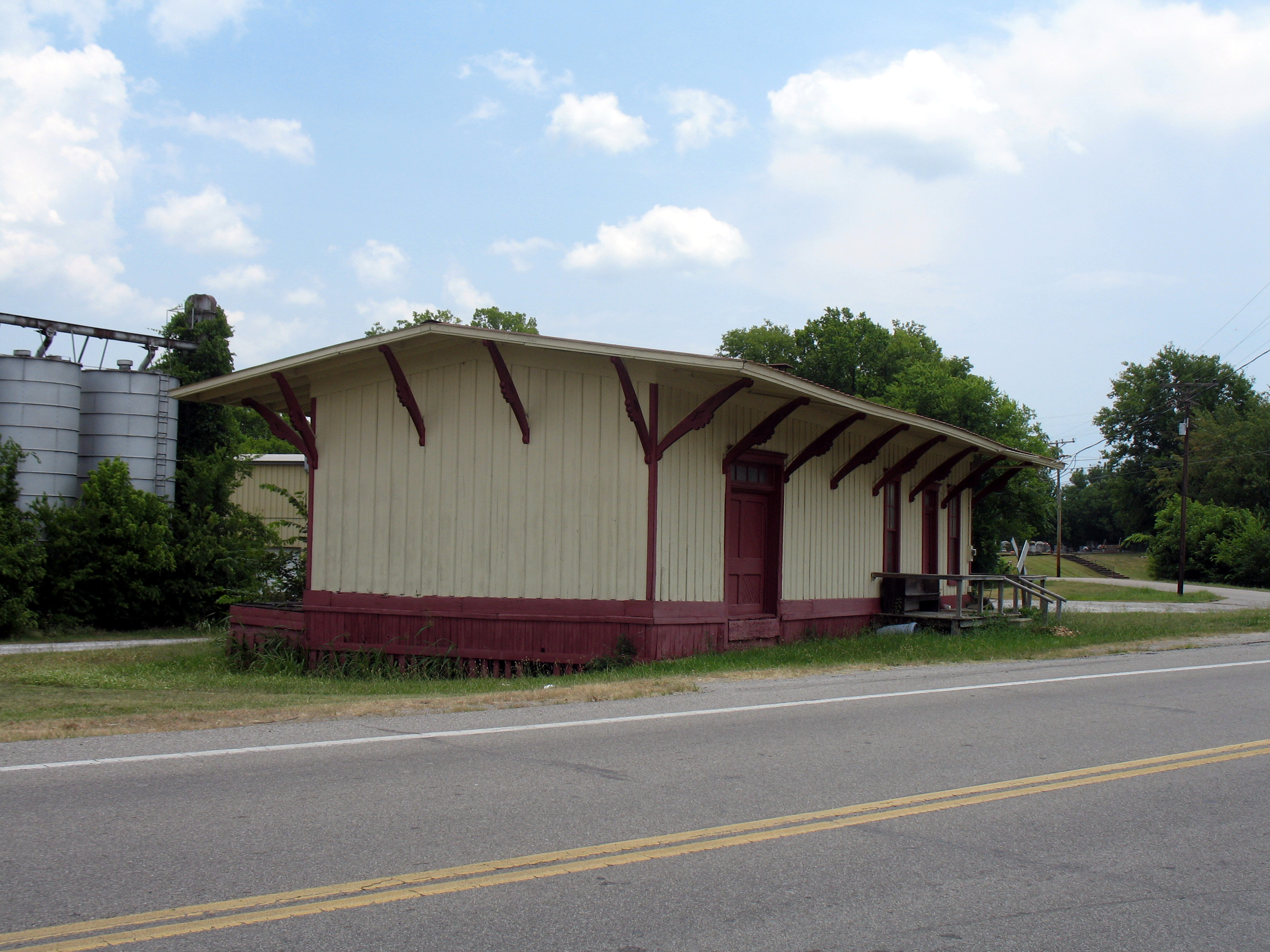
- Belfast Railroad Depot

- Location within Tennessee Location within the United States
- Coordinates: 35°25′15″N 86°42′09″W
- Country: United States
- State: Tennessee
- County: Marshall
- Named after: Belfast, Northern Ireland
- Elevation: 830 ft (250 m)

Population
  - Total: 844
- Time zone: UTC-6 (Central (CST))
  - Summer (DST): UTC-5 (CDT)
- ZIP code: 37019
- Area code: 931
- GNIS feature ID: 1276896

Belfast is an unincorporated community in Marshall County, Tennessee, United States. The area ZIP code is 37019. It is roughly halfway between Nashville, Tennessee, to the north and Huntsville, Alabama, to the south.

== History ==
A post office was established at Belfast in 1836. The community was named after Belfast, Northern Ireland. The first commercial business in Belfast opened in 1838.

=== 1952 tornado ===
On February 29, 1952, a weak but catastrophic F1 tornado hit the town, killing three and injuring 166. As of 2022, this is the most injuries ever caused by an F1/EF1 tornado in the United States, although sources vary on the actual casualty toll.

== Notable people ==
- Haliey Welch, best known for the 2024 internet meme hawk tuah
