= Tennessee State Route 11 =

State highway in Tennessee, United States

State Route 11
- SR 11; primary in red, unsigned in green

Route information
- Maintained by TDOT
- Length: 146.20 mi (235.29 km)
- Existed: October 1, 1923–present

Standalone section
- Length: 19.4 mi (31.2 km)
- South end: SR 207 at the Alabama state line near Minor Hill
- Major intersections: US 64 in Pulaski; SR 15 / SR 166 in Pulaski
- North end: US 31 / US 31A in Pulaski

Location
- Country: United States
- State: Tennessee
- Counties: Giles

Highway system
- Tennessee State Routes; Interstate; US; State
← US 11W	→ SR 12

State Route 11 (SR 11) is a mostly unsigned south–north highway that goes from the Alabama border in Giles County, Tennessee to the Kentucky border in Montgomery County.

== Route description ==
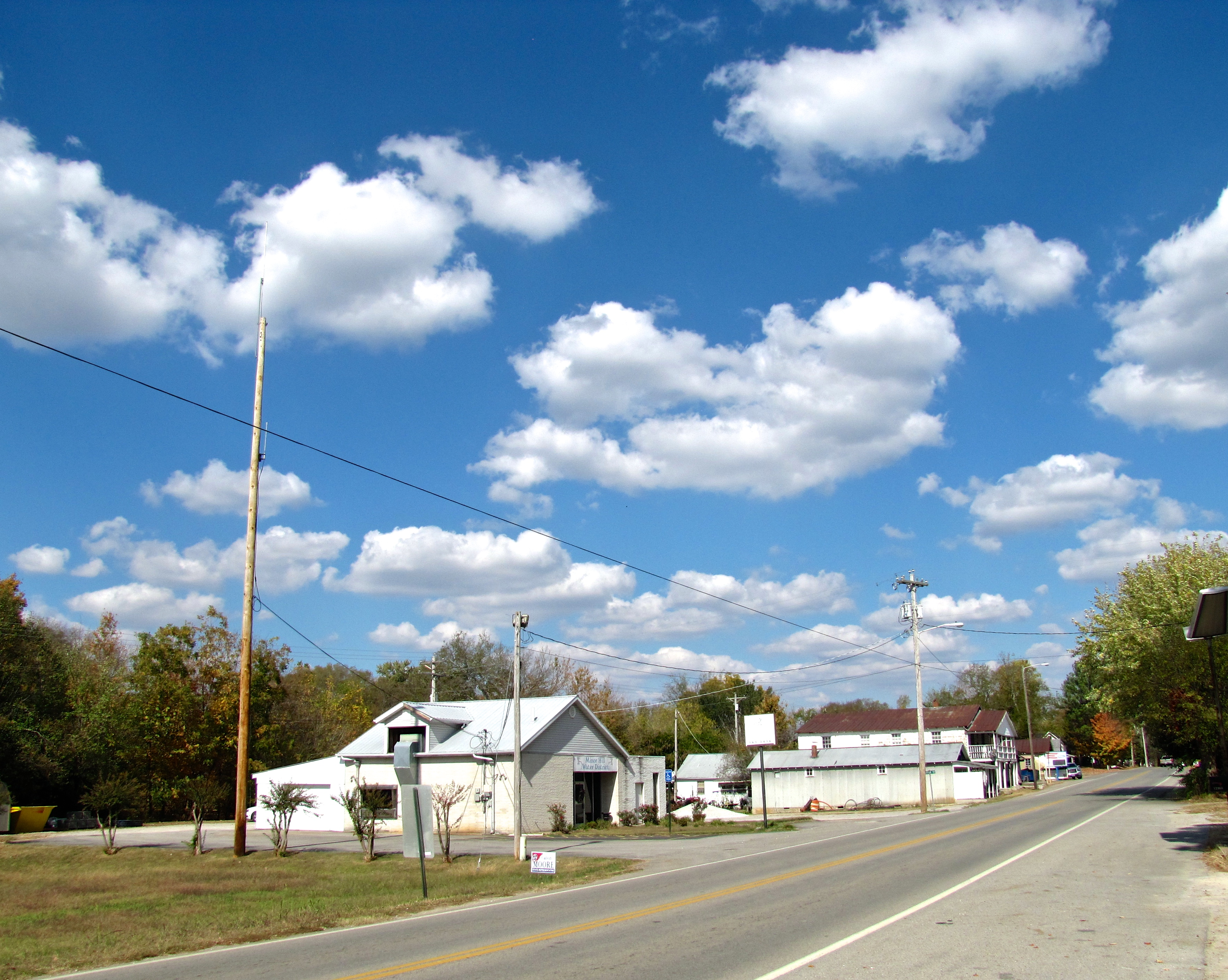
State Route 11 in Minor Hill.

SR 11 begins as a signed primary highway in Giles County at the Alabama state line. It passes through rolling hills and farmland to pass through Minor Hill and Goodspring before entering the Pulaski city limits at an intersection with US 64. It then becomes concurrent with SR 166 before passing through neighborhoods and crossing a bridge over Richland Creek to enter downtown. They then come to an intersection with SR 15, where SR 11 splits from SR 166 and follows SR 15 east. They then come to an intersection with US 31 (SR 7), where SR 11 becomes unsigned and it follows US 31/SR 7 north to US 31A.

State Route 11 is mostly a primary highway, except for in Pulaski, where it turns secondary between US 64 and US 31. SR 11 is also secondary through the entirety of Rutherford County according to TDOT Functional Classification Map. Finally, SR 11 is secondary throughout Davidson County, from around I-440 to US 41, where it turns primary once again.

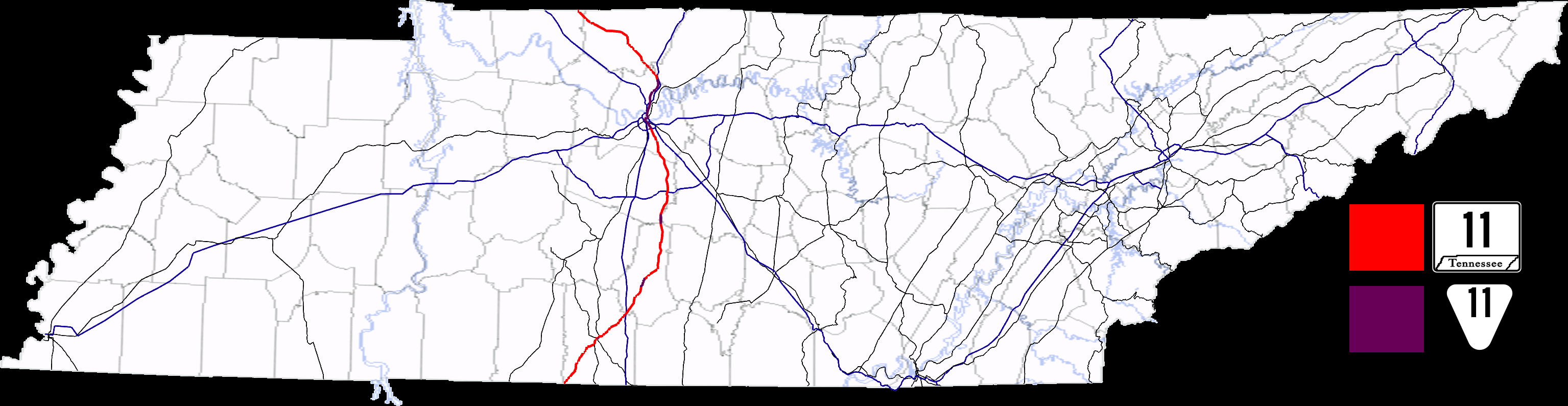
Map of Tennessee State Route 11, with the separate primary and secondary designations.

== Major junctions ==
The entire route is in Giles County.

Location	mi	km	Destinations	Notes
Minor Hill	0.0	0.0	SR 207 south – Anderson	Continuation into Alabama; southern terminus
Pulaski	16.0	25.7	US 64 (Lawrenceburg Highway) – Lawrenceburg, Fayetteville	
Pulaski	16.2	26.1	SR 166 south (Bethel Road) – Bethel	Southern end of SR 166 overlap
Pulaski	17.8– 18.0	28.6– 29.0	C. E. Depriest Bridge over Richland Creek	
Pulaski	18.2	29.3	SR 15 west / SR 166 north (W. College Street) – Lawrenceburg, Mount Pleasant	Northern end of SR 166 overlap; southern end of SR 15 overlap
Pulaski	18.7	30.1	US 31 south (S. 1st Street/SR 7) / SR 15 east (E. College Street) – Elkton, Fayetteville	Southern end of US 31 overlap; northern end of SR 15 overlap
Pulaski	19.4	31.2	US 31 north (N. 1st Street/SR 7) / US 31A begins (E. Grigsby Street) – Columbia	Northern end of US 31 overlap; southern end of US 31A overlap
1.000 mi = 1.609 km; 1.000 km = 0.621 mi: Concurrency terminus; Incomplete access

== See also ==
- List of state routes in Tennessee
