= Tennessee State Route 155 =

Highway in Tennessee, United States

State Route 155
- Briley Parkway; Thompson Lane; White Bridge Road
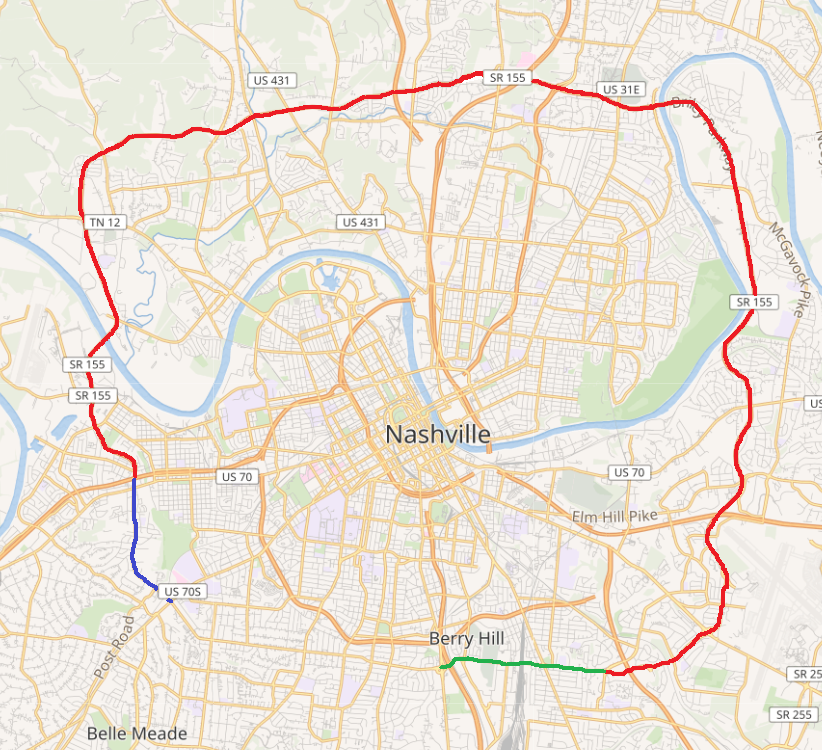
- Briley Parkway highlighted in red, Thompson Lane highlighted in green, White Bridge Road highlighted in blue

Route information
- Maintained by TDOT
- Length: 30.69 mi (49.39 km)
- History: Completed in 1997

Major junctions
- Loop around Nashville
- west end: US 70S near Belle Meade
- US 70 in West Nashville; I-40 in West Nashville; US 41A in northwest Nashville; US 431 in northwest Nashville; I-24 in northern Nashville; I-65 / US 31W / US 41 / US 31E in Madison; US 70 in Donelson; I-40 near Donelson; US 41 / US 70S in southeast Nashville; I-24 near Antioch; US 31A / US 41A in South Nashville
- east end: US 31 in Oak Hill

Location
- Country: United States
- State: Tennessee
- Counties: Davidson

Highway system
- Tennessee State Routes; Interstate; US; State
← I-155	→ SR 156

State Route 155 (SR 155), mostly designated as Briley Parkway, is a major state highway that forms a beltway around Nashville, Tennessee, United States. The northern portion of the route is a freeway that forms a circular controlled-access bypass around downtown Nashville, along with I-440 to the south. The southern portion of the road is split into two major surface arterial roads called Thompson Lane to the south and White Bridge Road to the southwest. Both of these roads are connected by Woodmont Boulevard, which is not part of SR 155, but, combined, forms a complete loop. SR 155 has a total length 30.69 miles (49.39 km), and transitions between being signed as a north–south and east–west road in multiple locations.

Briley Parkway, named in honor of former Nashville mayor Beverly Briley, serves as the primary means of access to the Grand Ole Opry House, Opry Mills, and the Opryland Hotel east of downtown Nashville. It crosses the Cumberland River twice, once near Madison, and again on the west side of Nashville, near John C. Tune Airport and the Riverbend Maximum Security Institution. Both of these crossings replaced ferries that had operated since the later 19th century. On the southeast portion of the loop, Briley Parkway passes Nashville International Airport. Along its length, the road provides access to multiple Interstate, U.S., and state highways.

SR 155 was first established around 1956 for Thompson Lane. Briley Parkway initially began as a project managed by the Nashville city government, with the first section opening in 1961. Most of the eastern segment was constructed in the 1960s, and some additional progress was made over the following decade. The city struggled to fund the project, and completion was further complicated by a number of factors including changing federal laws, public opposition, and failure to secure adequate federal and state funding sources. The state assumed control of the project in 1983, and the last section of Briley Parkway was completed in 1997. Between 1996 and 2007, much of SR 155 was widened in multiple phases. Several major interchanges were reconstructed and expanded between 2000 and 2011.

== Route description ==
The Briley Parkway and Thompson Lane sections of SR 155 are part of the National Highway System, a national network of roads identified as important to the United States' economy, defense, and mobility. The Briley Parkway portion is designated as a primary highway, and the Thompson Lane and White Bridge Road portions are designated secondary highways. On the freeway portion of SR 155, annual average daily traffic (AADT) volumes in 2024 ranged from 110,170 vehicles per day between Opry Mills Drive and Two Rivers Parkway to 27,171 vehicles between SR 12 (Ashland City Highway) and US 41A (Clarksville Pike). The lowest traffic volume on the surface-street portion of SR 155 was 21,631 vehicles per day on Thompson Lane between US 31 (Franklin Pike) and Iris Drive. Unlike the Interstates in Nashville, the controlled-access portion of SR 155 rarely experiences severe congestion. Unlike many ring roads which utilize inner–outer directional signage, SR 155 transitions between north–south and east–west signage three times as the cardinal directions of the route change. (Note: In a counterclockwise direction, SR 155 is signed east–west from US 31 to US 41/70S; north–south from US 41/70S to milepost 13.0; east–west from milepost 13.0 to 23.0; and north–south from milepost 23.0 to US 70S. Signage on SR 12 at the interchange with SR 155 near milepost 24.0 shows the direction transitioning from north–south to east–west, although the change occurs on directional mileposts approximately one mile (1.6 km) north of here.) Driving the full length of SR 155 at the speed limit takes approximately one hour outside of rush hour.

=== Briley Parkway ===
Briley Parkway consists of the northern loop of SR 155 from I-40 on the west side of Nashville to I-24 southeast of downtown Nashville, which makes up about two-thirds of the length of the highway. The entirety of Briley Parkway is a controlled access highway, except for the 3.5-mile (5.6 km) segment between I-24 and I-40, which is limited access. Exits are numbered counterclockwise, beginning at the southeast interchange with I-24 and extending to I-40 in West Nashville.

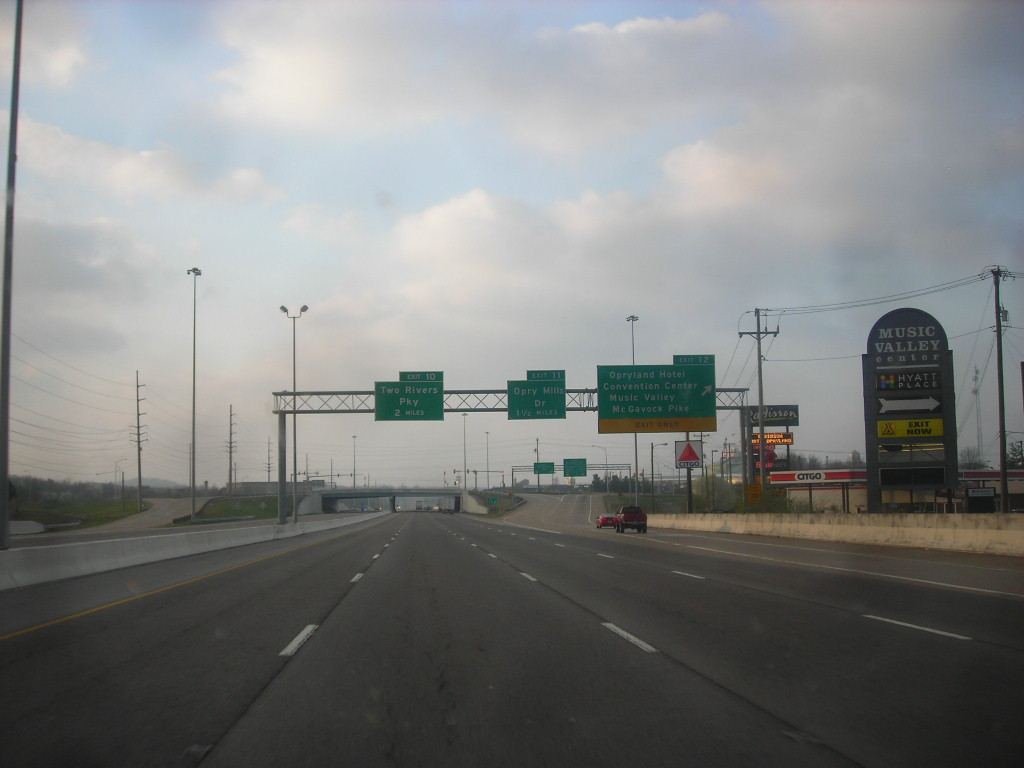
SR 155 (Briley Parkway) at the McGavock Pike interchange, the main connection point to the Grand Ole Opry and Gaylord Opryland Resort & Convention Center. Signs for Opry Mills Drive and Two Rivers Parkway are also posted.

Briley Parkway begins as a four-lane freeway at a four-level stack interchange with I-40 in West Nashville where SR 155 continues to the south as White Bridge Road. Briley Parkway immediately curves northwest and then north, and briefly runs along the west bank of Richland Creek before crossing it. The first interchange is with Centennial Boulevard, which connects to Cockrill Bend Boulevard near John C. Tune Airport, Riverbend Maximum Security Institution, and an industrial area. The parkway immediately crosses a CSX rail spur that serves the industrial area and airport. SR 155 then curves northeast and crosses the Cumberland River before turning north and reaching an interchange with County Hospital Road near the University School of Nashville, the Debra K. Johnson Rehabilitation Center, and the old Tennessee State Prison. Continuing through further industrialized territory, the highway crosses the mainline railroad operated by Nashville and Eastern Railroad and reaches an interchange with SR 12 (Ashland City Highway) about 1.5 miles (2.4 km) later in the neighborhood of Northwest Nashville. Here, the parkway curves sharply to the northeast, running mostly west to east beyond this point on the northern edge of the urbanized parts of Nashville and Davidson County.

Passing through several deep artificial rock cuts flanked by tall limestone bluffs, the next interchange is with US 41A (Clarksville Pike) about three miles (4.8 km) later near the neighborhood of Haynes Estates. About one mile (1.6 km) later is an interchange with US 431 (Whites Creek Pike). About 1.5 miles (2.4 km) later, Briley Parkway reaches I-24 in a cloverleaf interchange. About 1/4 mile (0.40 km) beyond that is the next interchange, which is with Brick Church Pike. Beyond this point, Briley Parkway continues for another 1 mile (1.6 km) into the south end of the Madison neighborhood, and has a complicated stack interchange complex with US 31W/41 (Dickerson Pike) and I-65, then US 31E southbound (Ellington Parkway) less than 1/2 mile (0.80 km) later. At these interchanges, US 31W/41 (Dickerson Pike) and I-65 southbound are accessible together from both directions. From the westbound lanes, I-65 northbound and US 31E southbound (Ellington Parkway) are accessible together. From the eastbound lanes, I-65 northbound and US 31E southbound (Ellington Parkway) are concurrent with each other until the merge lanes end next to Goodpasture Christian School. Through this interchange complex, Briley Parkway is paralleled on both sides by local-express lanes that provide unobstructed access between I-65 and US 31E.

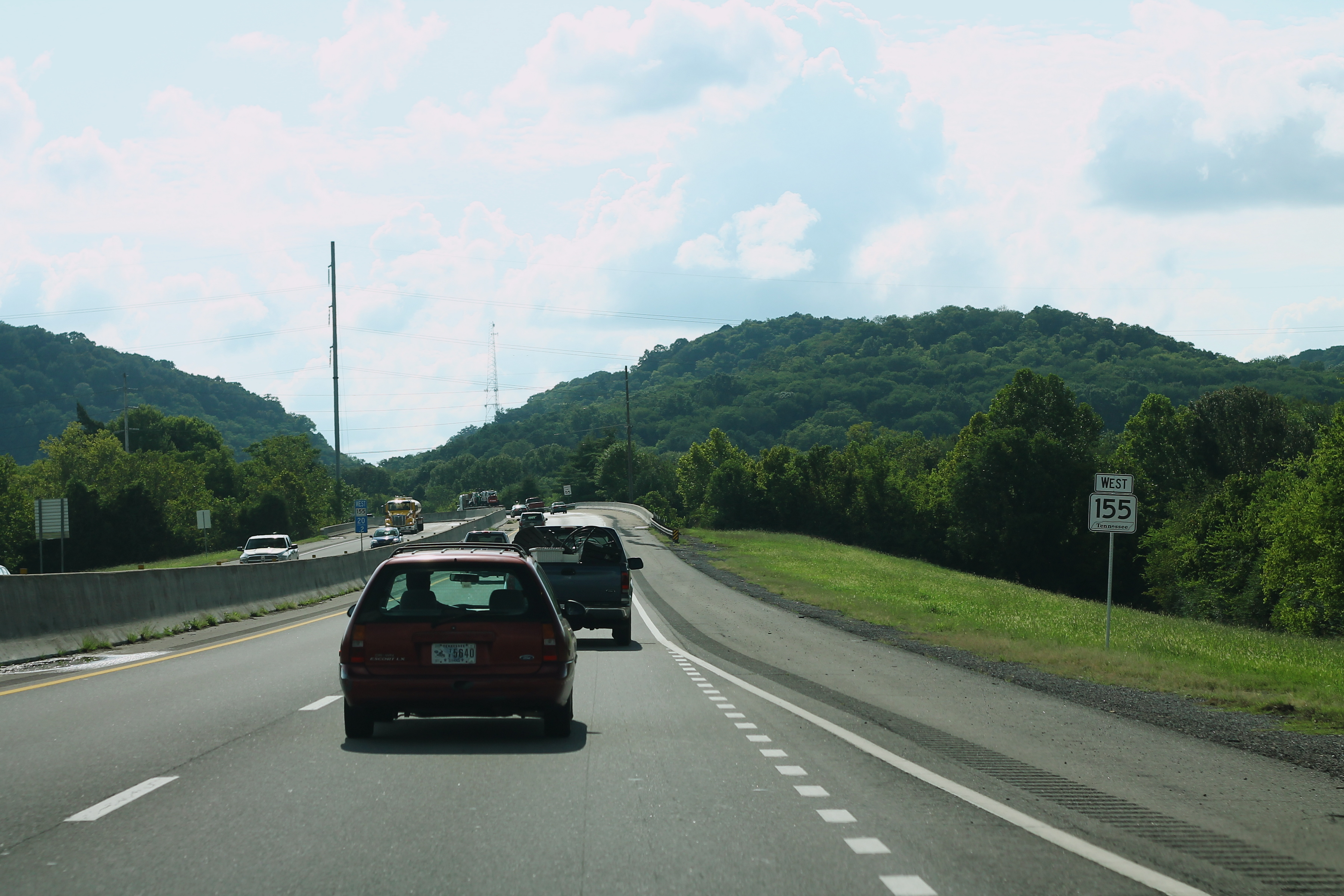
SR 155/Briley Parkway near the US 431 exit

At this point, Briley Parkway widens from four to eight lanes and begins a brief concurrency with US 31E. The routes then pass under a CSX railroad, and US 31E splits off northbound as Gallatin Pike a short distance beyond in the northern part of the Inglewood neighborhood. The highway then crosses the Cumberland River again and curves sharply to the southeast. Here, the parkway enters the Music Valley entertainment district, and reaches a single-point urban interchange (SPUI) with McGavock Pike. This road is a connector road to the Gaylord Opryland Resort & Convention Center and the site of the Grand Ole Opry. Entering a short straightaway, Briley Parkway runs almost directly north-south at this point. Less than 1.5 miles (2.4 km) later, Briley Parkway has a trumpet interchange with a connector road to Opry Mills Mall, another major anchor of Music Valley. The next interchange, about 1/2 mile (0.80 km) later, is with Two Rivers Parkway. The parkway then shifts slightly to the west, before curving sharply to the east, and then to the west again, in somewhat of a c-shaped curve where it crosses the Nashville and Eastern Railroad again and briefly runs along the east bank of the Cumberland River. The freeway then reaches an interchange with US 70 (Lebanon Pike) in the Donelson neighborhood. The route shifts slightly again, maintaining its general north-south direction. Then, slightly over one mile (1.6 km) later is the next interchange, which is with Elm Hill Pike. The parkway then curves to the southwest, and reaches a three-level combination interchange with I-40 near the Nashville International Airport. Here, the route reduces to two lanes in each direction, and the freeway segment ends.

Continuing as a limited-access highway, Briley Parkway has at-grade signalized intersections with three major thoroughfares before reaching a trumpet interchange with Airways Boulevard, an exit to the former site of Nashville's Berry Field airport. The route continues for another mile, next to an aircraft manufacturing site adjacent to the airport, before reaching a SPUI with US 41/70S (Murfreesboro Road). Running northeast–southwest, Briley Parkway continues for another 1.5 miles (2.4 km), crossing Mill Creek and another CSX line, before reaching a partial cloverleaf interchange with I-24. This partial cloverleaf interchange also includes access to a restricted connector road Averitt Express Drive, the entrance to an Averitt Express freight hub. The limited-access segment of Briley Parkway ends at this interchange. However, the Briley Parkway designation does not end until an intersection about 0.4 miles (0.64 km) later, where SR 155 becomes Thompson Lane.

=== White Bridge Road and Thompson Lane ===
The segment of SR 155 designated as White Bridge Road (Note: Also signed as White Bridge Pike) begins at the interchange with I-40 in West Nashville, where the route continues north as controlled-access Briley Parkway. This entire section of SR 155 is a four-lane major arterial thoroughfare with many intersections with local roads. Beyond this point, the route immediately has an intersection with US 70 (Charlotte Avenue), and runs directly north-south before curving to the southeast over one mile (1.6 km) later near Nashville State Community College. The road then crosses Richland Creek and a CSX railroad on a single bridge and intersects US 70S (Harding Road) near Belle Meade. At this intersection, the route becomes two-lane Woodmont Boulevard, a city-maintained road, although many maps show this segment as being part of SR 155. About 2/3 mile (1.1 km) later, the road curves to the southeast, and begins running east-west nearly perfectly straight before reaching an intersection with US 431 (Hillsboro Pike).

About 1.5 miles (2.4 km) later, the route briefly enters the north end of the suburb of Oak Hill. Here, it widens back to four lanes and has an interchange with US 31 (Franklin Road), where the road becomes Thompson Lane, and SR 155 begins again. The route then crosses I-65 without an interchange and another CSX railroad, before intersecting with Powell Avenue near the city of Berry Hill, which contains signs directing drivers to I-65. Continuing east, Thompson Lane traverses through Woodlawn Memorial Park and then passes through a short and divided tunnel beneath the north end of a railyard that is part of the Nashville Terminal Subdivision operated by CSX. About 1.25 miles (2.01 km) later, the road intersects US 31A/41A (Nolensville Pike) in the Woodbine area. About one mile (1.6 km) later, the route reaches an intersection where Thompson Lane splits off to the north, and the route becomes Briley Parkway. The interchange with I-24 is less than 1/2 mile (0.80 km) beyond this point.

=== Honorary designations ===
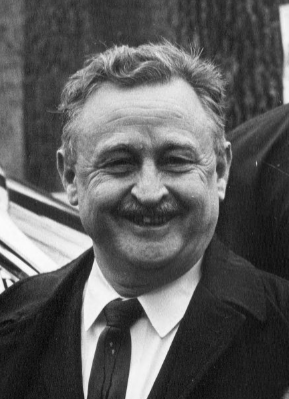
Beverly Briley, the first Mayor of Metropolitan Nashville

Briley Parkway is named after Beverly Briley, who served as the first mayor of the metropolitan government of Nashville after the government was consolidated with that of Davidson County. The road was officially given this name by the Davidson County Court on October 20, 1958. In 1967, the Tennessee General Assembly designated the bridge across the Cumberland River at Pennington Bend the "Duke-Fuqua Memorial Bridge" after Marine Sgt. Kenneth Duke of Nashville, who was killed in the Korean War, and 2nd Lt. John Edward Fuqua, also of Nashville, who was killed in the Vietnam War. The Cumberland River bridge at Cockrill Bend was named the "Andrew B. Gibson Bridge" in 1986 while under construction after a longtime city official who served as chairman of the Metro Civil Service Commission and had advocated for its construction. In 2007, the section between Two Rivers Parkway and the Cumberland River was named in honor of John A. Hobbs, a businessman who owned several establishments in Donelson and Music Valley. Another section was named for Jack Vaughn, a businessman who was instrumental in the development of the Opryland Hotel, in 1999. On July 14, 2011, the bridge connecting I-40 eastbound to SR 155 northbound at the western I-40 exchange was dedicated as the "Ralph M. Cohen Memorial Flyover" in honor of a Nashville councilman and businessman. In 2022, the interchange with McGavock Pike was designated the "Ronnie Hobbs Memorial Interchange" in memory of a local businessman. The interchange with US 31E (Gallatin Pike) was dedicated the "Robert B. Beck Sr. Memorial Interchange" on February 23, 2023, honoring another local business leader. In September 2024, the Opry Mills Drive interchange was named for country music singer and Grand Ole Opry star Jeannie Seely.

== History ==
=== Early history ===
Thompson Lane is named for the family that established Glen Leven Farm in Oak Hill in 1790. This residence was established by Thomas Thompson, who was one of Middle Tennessee's earliest settlers and a signer of the Cumberland Compact. This family also includes Joe Thompson, a decorated World War II pilot. A short road between the old Franklin Pike and Nolensville Road was present in the latter half of the 19th century, and the name Thompson Lane, which was also spelled "Thompson's Lane", was in use by the 1890s. In 1914, Woodmont Boulevard was constructed by real estate developers and property owners at a cost of approximately $85,000 (equivalent to $2.02 million in 2025). Known for many years afterwards by the nickname "Concrete Boulevard", this 32-foot (9.8 m) road was the first road to be surfaced with concrete in Nashville, and the first documented concrete road in Tennessee. It came to serve the Woodmont Estates neighborhood, which was established in 1937. In 1964, the concrete surface was replaced with asphalt. In 1917, an underpass was constructed under the present-day Nashville Terminal Subdivision, which was then owned by the Louisville and Nashville Railroad. White Bridge Road is named for the Old White Bridge over the railroad, which was constructed in 1913 and replaced an older wooden bridge. This bridge is located near where the Great Train Wreck of 1918 occurred.

In 1940, Vultee Aircraft announced plans to construct an aircraft manufacturing plant near the Nashville International Airport in anticipation of the United States entry into World War II. As part of a plan to improve infrastructure around the plant, the Davidson County government in 1941 widened Thompson Lane to four lanes between Bransford Avenue in Berry Hill and the L&N Railroad Underpass, and built a new four-lane extension of it from US 31A/41A (Nolensville Pike) to US 41/70S (Murfreesboro Road). The SR 155 designation was first established for this section of Thompson Lane, including the section between west of present-day I-24 and US 41/70S that is now city-maintained. It first appeared in the 1956 biannual report of the Tennessee Department of Highways, the predecessor agency to TDOT, and was the highest numbered route in the state route system at the time. On July 21, 1950, a contract was awarded to widen a section of US 31A/41A to four lanes in the Woodbine area, which also included expanding the section of Thompson Lane between the railroad underpass and east of US 31A/41A and improving the intersection between these two roads. Construction was delayed due to disputes over utility relocations. The project was finally completed and dedicated on October 5, 1954.

=== Briley Parkway planning and eastern leg ===
In 1940, the Davidson County Planning Commission adopted a major thoroughfare plan, which included a partial circumferential route around the city. An additional study was undertaken by the city in the late 1950s, which affirmed the need for a full circumferential highway. The plan for what would become Briley Parkway was adopted by the then-separate Nashville and Davidson County planning commissions on May 15, 1958. A subsequent study was undertaken in 1959 in collaboration with local, state, and federal officials, and published in 1961, re-established the need for such a beltway. Briley Parkway was initially a city project, with some segments receiving state and federal funding.

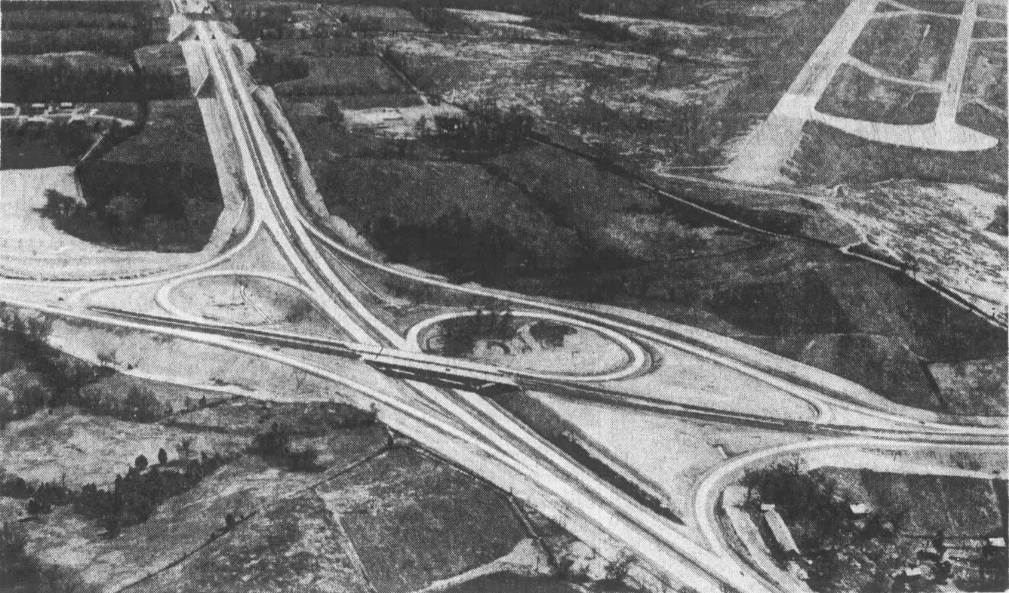
The interchange between I-40 and SR 155 near the Nashville International Airport in 1963, looking east.

The first contract for the Briley Parkway portion of SR 155 was awarded in December 1960 for the 1.2-mile (1.9 km) section between Vultee Boulevard and Dabbs Avenue directly south of the eastern I-40 interchange, and construction was underway one month later. Work was completed on November 15, 1961. Construction on the eastern interchange with I-40 began on May 8, 1961, along with a connecting 2.2-mile (3.5 km) section of I-40. This was completed and opened to local traffic by April 1963, although the section of I-40, which was part of a longer 28-mile (45 km) section, was not entirely finished until August 1965. The bridge across I-40 on the western leg was also built in 1963 in conjunction with that section of I-40. The first contract for the construction of the eastern Cumberland River bridge, referred to at the time as the Pennington Bend Bridge, was awarded in December 1962. The 2.2-mile (3.5 km) segment between the intersection with Thompson Lane and Vultee Boulevard just north of US 41/70S (Murfreesboro Road) was let on February 28, 1964, and opened to traffic on October 29, 1965. Contracts for the remainder of the 2.7-mile (4.3 km) section between US 31E (Gallatin Road) and McGavock Pike were awarded on April 24, 1964, and the segment was dedicated and opened on November 3, 1965, by Tennessee Governor Frank G. Clement and Mayor Briley. This section replaced the nearby Williamson Ferry or Williams Ferry, which had operated since the late 19th century.

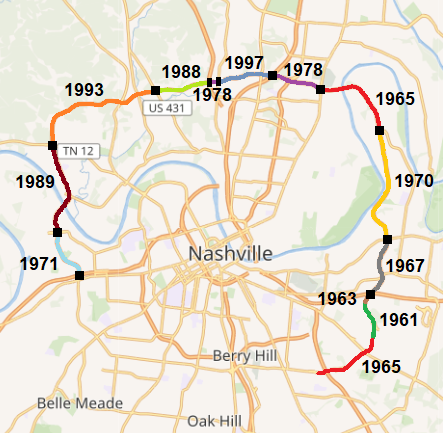
A diagram showing the year each section of the Briley Parkway portion of SR 155 was completed. Black squares indicate sections separated by interchanges.

Bids for the segment between I-40 and US 70 in the Donelson neighborhood were solicited on August 27, 1965, and the segment opened to traffic on July 1, 1967. The contract for the 3.5-mile (5.6 km) section between McGavock Pike and US 70 (Lebanon Road) was awarded in May 1968, and construction was finished in late 1970. In West Nashville, the 1.5-mile (2.4 km) section between I-40 and Centennial Boulevard was let in June 1969, and completed by July 1971. In December 1974, contracts were awarded for the construction of the interchanges with Brick Church Pike and US 31E (Gallatin Pike). Five months later, a contract was awarded for construction of the 1.1-mile (1.8 km) section between I-65 and US 31E (Gallatin Pike) and the interchange with the Ellington Parkway section of US 31E. The 0.3-mile (0.48 km) section between I-24 and Brick Church Pike became usable to local traffic when I-24 was completed between Nashville and Clarksville in January 1978, and the two-mile (3.2 km) segment between I-65 and US 31E (Gallatin Pike) opened on March 30, 1978.

The construction of Briley Parkway on Pennington Bend facilitated the development of the Music Valley entertainment district, which had previously been farmland. This began with the Opryland USA theme park in 1972, and the relocation of the Grand Ole Opry from the Ryman Auditorium in downtown Nashville to the new Grand Ole Opry House in 1974. The Gaylord Opryland Resort & Convention Center opened in 1977. Opryland USA closed in 1997, and was replaced three years later with Opry Mills. To make way for these developments, a new trumpet interchange was constructed in 1971 with Opryland Drive, which is now called Opry Mills Drive. The following year, an interchange was constructed with McGavock Pike.

=== Briley Parkway western leg delays, routing debate, and construction ===
In the early 1960s Nashville officials were stressing the need to complete the western leg of the parkway, particularly the Cumberland River bridge. At the time, the parkway was planned to be completed by the end of 1970 and before the Interstates in Nashville, but the project was plagued by funding inadequacies from the start. Local leaders argued the western river bridge was needed to stimulate industrial growth in the Cockrill Bend area on the former site of the county farm at the state penitentiary, and improve access to existing industries, including a glass plant operated by Ford Motor Company. On April 20, 1962, The Nashville Tennessean published an editorial urging state funding of the bridge. That year, the developer of a residential subdivision in Northwest Nashville provided a strip of land for the parkway. After local economic development officials and the Nashville Area Chamber of Commerce began working to recruit industries to the Cockrill Bend area, completion of the bridge was once again stressed by planners in late 1963. In December 1970, planners estimated that delays in completion of the parkway were costing Nashville $400 million (equivalent to $2.56 billion in 2025) worth of industry and 20,000 jobs in the Cockrill Bend area, as well as contributing to traffic congestion caused by truck traffic on surface streets. Nevertheless, the remainder of the freeway was delayed by the inability of the city to appropriate monies and secure federal and state funding sources. In addition, new requirements imposed by the National Environmental Policy Act of 1969 required an environmental impact statement (EIS) to be prepared in order to receive federal funds.

A map produced by TDOT and published in The Tennessean outlining the proposed routes of the Briley Parkway extension. The dotted line represents the original proposal, and the solid lines represent alternative alignments.

The completion of the mainline Interstates in Nashville in the 1970s also satisfied many of the traffic concerns that Briley Parkway was originally intended to address, leading to the extension project to be deprioritized. However, a public hearing was first held on August 18, 1971. The proposed routing also drew opposition from the African American residents of western Nashville. Many were concerned the parkway would decimate their neighborhoods, similar to what had happened to Jefferson Street with the construction of I-40 in the late 1960s and early 1970s. In response to this opposition, TDOT began exploring four alternate routes by 1978. In 1979, the Metro Planning Commission approved the routing for the remainder of the route, which was moved further out from previous proposals in response to public opposition. In late 1981, TDOT announced plans to conduct environmental studies on the route. In 1982, the Tennessee General Assembly passed legislation authorizing the issuance of $10 million (equivalent to $28.2 million in 2025) in bonds to fund the Cumberland River Bridge at Cockrill Bend, which was referred to at the time as the Cockrill Bend Bridge. This legislation was vetoed by Governor Lamar Alexander, who was opposed to sidestepping normal funding processes, and subsequently overridden by the legislature. On July 1, 1983, TDOT officially assumed control of Briley Parkway as part of a larger takeover of local roads throughout the state, numbering the remainder of the route as part of SR 155. On August 17, 1983, the Federal Highway Administration (FHWA) approved a draft EIS for the remainder of SR 155. That same year, the state legislature approved the issuance of $15 million (equivalent to $40.7 million in 2025) in bonds for the bridge project, but the constitutionality of both bonding bills came into question later that year. The approval of the final EIS was announced on December 13, 1984.

In March 1985, TDOT solicited bids for the construction of the Cockrill Bend Bridge. Construction was scheduled for completion by the summer of 1987, but the bridge could not be opened to traffic until the approaches were completed. In June 1985, bids were solicited for the construction of the 1.2-mile (1.9 km) section between Centennial Boulevard and the Cumberland River bridge, which also included expanding the Centennial Boulevard interchange from a traditional diamond interchange footprint to a partial cloverleaf interchange. The 1.7-mile (2.7 km) section between US 431 (Whites Creek Pike) was let in December 1986. In May 1987, a contract was awarded for the construction of the section between the Cumberland River and SR 12 (Ashland City Highway). On December 21, 1989, the section between Centennial Boulevard and SR 12, including the bridge over the Cumberland River, opened. The first contract for the 4.2-mile (6.8 km) segment between SR 12 and US 431 was let in February 1991, and the section opened on December 15, 1993. Construction of the last section of Briley Parkway, the 1.6-mile (2.6 km) segment between Brick Church Pike and I-65, began in November 1995 and opened to traffic on December 19, 1997.

Before the extension of Briley Parkway was complete, it was credited with allowing long-planned industrial development to occur in the former county farm site on Cockrill Bend. The opening of the Andrew B. Gibson Bridge also resulted in the closure of Cleece's Ferry (or Clees' Ferry), which had operated on the site since 1872.

=== Expansion and improvement projects ===
On March 1, 1972, a contract was awarded for the relocated section of Thompson Lane between US 31 and Powell Avenue, which was constructed in conjunction with the section of I-65 where SR 155 crosses over. This included relocating the road to transition directly into Woodmont Boulevard, the construction of a new interchange with US 31, and the construction of an overpass over I-65. Prior to this, Thompson Lane intersection US 31 a short distance north of Woodmont Boulevard, creating a congestion hotspot. This new section of Thompson Lane opened to traffic on May 8, 1973. The section of White Bridge Road between Oakmont Circle and Post Road was widened from two to five lanes between early 1978 and January 1980. On September 8, 1980, a contract was awarded to widen the 0.6-mile (0.97 km) section of White Bridge Road from south of US 70 (Charlotte Avenue) to Oakmont Circle to five lanes. In late 1982, construction began to widen the last section of White Bridge Road, located between Post Road and US 70S, which included a new bridge constructed south of the Old White Bridge on a new alignment. This new alignment, which was finished in mid-1983, intersects with US 70S directly across from Woodmont Boulevard, and eliminated the need to turn onto US 70S to transition between White Bridge Road and Woodmont Boulevard. The old bridge and alignment are now part of the Richland Creek Greenway. In June 1984, construction began on a project to replace the railroad underpass on Thompson Lane with a new four-lane tunnel, which was constructed adjacent to the old underpass to the north. The original two-lane tunnel had become a traffic bottleneck. The new underpass was opened to traffic and dedicated by Governor Lamar Alexander on December 20, 1985. In 1991 and 1992, an interchange was constructed to provide access to the then-new Averitt Express terminal. The project, which was funded by the trucking company, drew opposition from nearby residents, who claimed that they had not been adequately notified and were concerned about impacts to their properties.

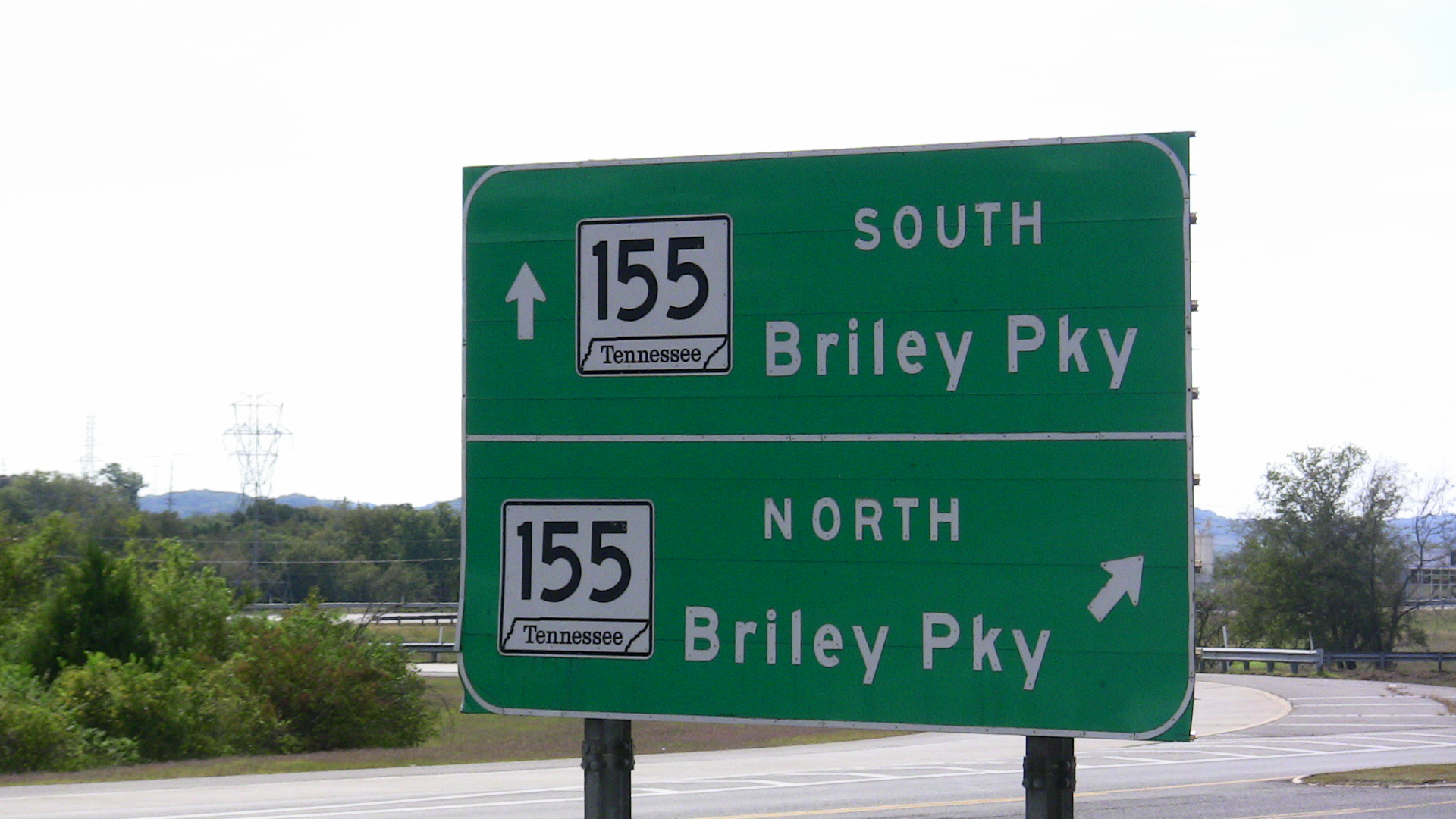
A sign off Exit 26 offering a choice between SR 155 northbound and SR 155 southbound. Similar signs are common on roads that junction with SR 155.

Before Briley Parkway was even completed, the state began making plans to widen and upgrade portions of the route. Briley Parkway between US 31E (Ellington Parkway) and I-40 in eastern Nashville was widened from four to eight lanes in multiple projects that also improved interchanges, straightened out curves, and leveled grades. The first project, which began on February 14, 1996, widened the route between Two Rivers Parkway and McGavock Pike, and converted the interchange with McGavock Pike into a single-point urban interchange (SPUI). This project was completed on November 1, 1997, six months ahead of schedule. The remainder of the project drew opposition and concerns from residents near the parkway during public hearings held in 1999 and 2000. Several were concerned about noise, damage to wetlands and streams, stormwater runoff pollution, and threats to the nearby Tanglewood Historic District in Inglewood. Others felt that expanding the highway to eight lanes was excessive. TDOT argued the expansion was necessary to handle projected traffic increases from the then-proposed Opry Mills mall and other developments in Music Valley, and agreed to take corrective measures to address concerns, including constructing noise walls along residential areas. They also agreed in April 1999 to keep four ramps in the US 31E (Ellington Parkway) interchange that they had planned to eliminate.

The next expansion phase, located between I-65 and US 31E (Gallatin Pike), began in late 2000 and was completed in September 2003. The remaining projects were plagued by multiple delays that occurred after construction began. The contract for the stretch located between US 31E (Gallatin Pike) and McGavock Pike was awarded in October 2001. Initially slated for completion in June 2004, the project quickly ran into delays related to billboard and utility relocation and permitting. In addition, TDOT officials ran into a dispute with the contractor when they accused them of not putting adequate resources into the project. The contractor denied these claims, but ultimately withdrew from the project in August 2004. The project was rebid three months later, and final work was not finished until late 2005. The section between south of Elm Hill Pike and US 70 (Lebanon Road) was awarded in August 2002, with completion initially slated for April 2005. The final phase, between US 70 and Two Rivers Parkway, was awarded four months later, with completion originally projected in June 2005. Both of these phases ran into complications due to TDOT's failure to acquire all necessary tracts of right-of-way, with the last tract not being purchased until December 2003. The former section was also delayed by an unforeseen issue with subsurface soil, requiring part of it to be reengineered. In January 2006, TDOT negotiated agreements to pay the contractors $125,000 extra per month to finish the projects by the end of that year. The section between US 70 and Two Rivers was completed by this deadline, but delays persisted on the last section, leading TDOT to begin penalizing the contractor in January 2007 and five months later enacting a temporary ban on them from bidding on contracts until it was completed. Final construction work was not finished until August 2007.

The southeastern interchange with I-24 was reconstructed in a project from March 2000 to May 2002 that included reducing the configuration from a cloverleaf to a partial cloverleaf by removing two loop off-ramps from I-24, lengthening ramps, adding turn lanes, and replacing the bridge on SR 155 over I-24. The project also included widening a 4.4-mile (7.1 km) segment of I-24. The interchange with US 41/70S (Murfreesboro Road) was reconstructed from a traditional diamond configuration into a single-point urban interchange from early 2001 to late 2003. In January 2001, work began on a project to modify the interchanges with I-65 and US 31E (Ellington Parkway). This consisted of constructing new flyover ramps between both routes, straightening ramps, and widening on I-65. The project was completed in early 2005, more than one year behind schedule. In January 2004, construction began on a project to expand the eastern interchange with I-40. This consisted of constructing a new wider overpass on SR 155 over I-40 and new flyover ramps to remove all at-grade intersections with ramps on SR 155 and provide full access-control between both routes. A three-mile (4.8 km) section of I-40 was also widened as part of this project. The new interchange was completed in December 2006, and the widening project finished the following month. The western interchange with I-40 and was reconstructed in two phases. The first phase, which began in November 2002, consisted of the construction of two flyover ramps to connect I-40 with the Briley Parkway section of SR 155, along with widening and interchanges improvements along this section of I-40. It was completed in July 2005. The second phase, which began in July 2009, received funding from the American Recovery and Reinvestment Act. This project consisted of the construction of an additional flyover ramp to I-40, providing complete access control between I-40 and the Briley Parkway segment; replacing the White Bridge Road overpass over I-40, modifications to the White Bridge Road movements, and additional widening on I-40 to the west. Work was completed in August 2011.

=== Other history ===
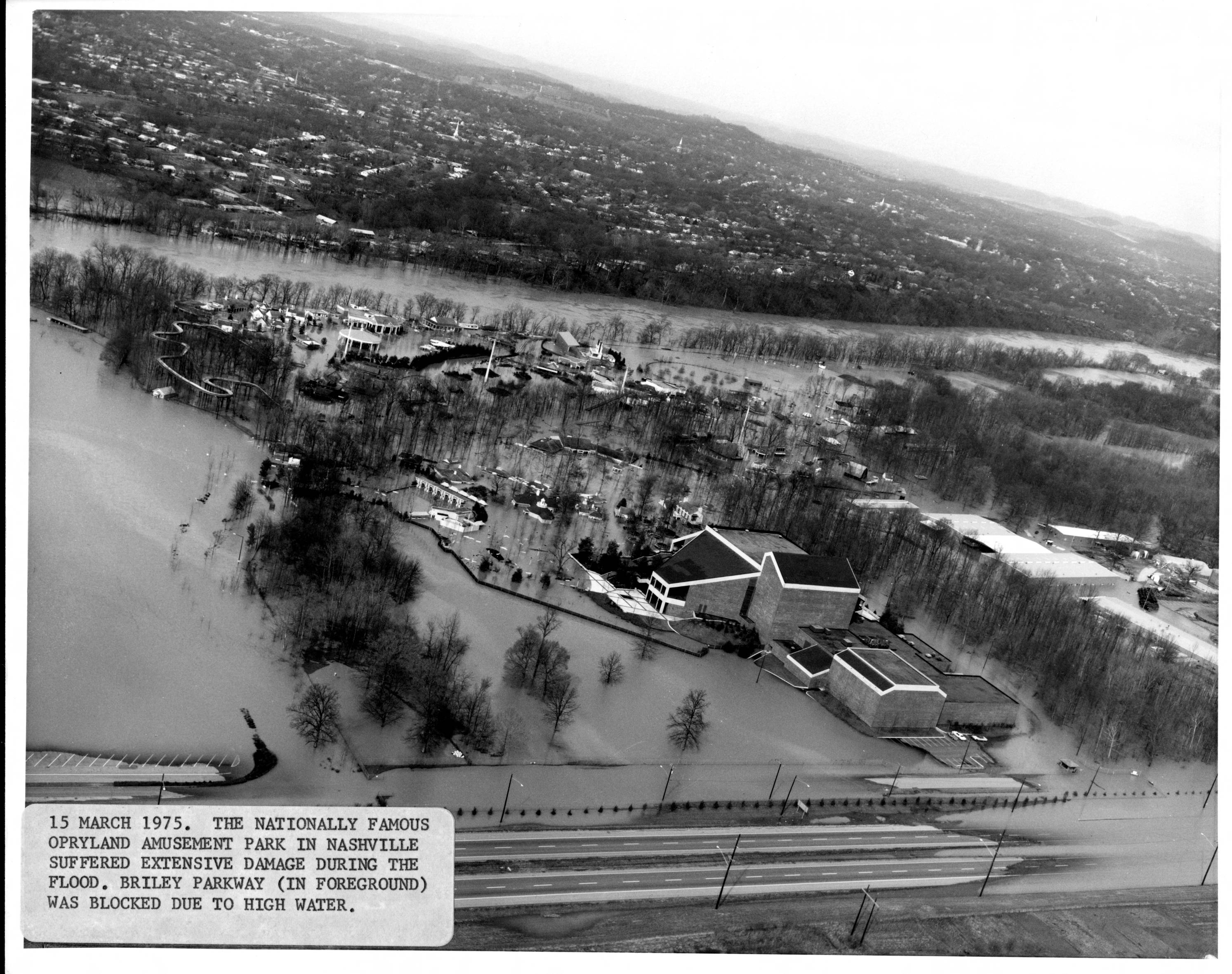
Flooding on SR 155/Briley Parkway (foreground) and Opryland USA in 1975

In 1971, U.S. District Court Judge Leland Clure Morton identified the completed sections of Briley Parkway as an unofficial boundary between African American and white neighborhoods in Nashville, and recommended that new schools be constructed in the vicinity of the parkway to maximize integration. At the time, Nashville was still struggling with de-facto school segregation, with the unpopular measures of desegregation busing being used to forcibly integrate schools. The strategy of using the parkway as a boundary was ultimately unsuccessful, as the parkway was a poor representation of the division of neighborhoods within the city. The parkway had also come to be viewed as an unofficial boundary between Nashville and its suburbs at this time.

On August 30, 1991, a car carrying country singer Dottie West crashed while attempting to exit from SR 155 onto Opryland Drive (now Opry Mills Drive). West, who had been on the way to a performance at the Grand Ole Opry, succumbed to her injuries five days later. An investigation later found that the car had attempted to take the 25-mile-per-hour (40 km/h) exit ramp at approximately 55 miles per hour (89 km/h). The 81-year-old driver, who was also injured, was later charged with reckless endangerment and pleaded no contest. He was ultimately sentenced to 11 months of probation and ordered to complete an alcohol recovery program.

On March 14 and 15, 1975, SR 155 was flooded near the Opryland USA theme park and the Grand Ole Opry, forcing a temporary closure. The road was again inundated and closed in the same location during the 2010 Tennessee floods.

== Major intersections ==
Counterclockwise (CCW) reads down, clockwise (CW) reads up. The entire route is in Davidson County.

Location	mi	km	Exit	Destinations	Notes
Nashville–Oak Hill line	0.00	0.00	—	US 31 (Franklin Pike / SR 6)	CW terminus of SR 155; interchange; unmarked exit 1; Thompson Lane continues to the west as Woodmont Boulevard
Nashville	1.62	2.61		US 31A / US 41A (Nolensville Pike / SR 11)	
Nashville	2.95	4.75	3	I-24 – Chattanooga, Nashville	CW end of freeway; signed as exits 3A (east) and 3B (west); I-24 exit 54; Thompson Lane becomes Briley Pkwy.
Nashville	3.26	5.25	—	Averitt Express Drive – Authorized vehicles only	CW access via exit 3B
Nashville	4.33	6.97	4	US 41 / US 70S (Murfreesboro Pike / SR 1)	CCW end of freeway
Nashville	5.25	8.45	5	Airways Boulevard	Interchange
Nashville	6.40	10.30	6	I-40 – International Airport, Knoxville, Nashville	CW end of freeway; signed as exits 6A (east) and 6B (west); I-40 exit 204
Nashville	7.13	11.47	7	Elm Hill Pike	
Nashville	8.31	13.37	8	US 70 (Lebanon Pike / SR 24) – Donelson	
Nashville	10.20	16.42	10	Two Rivers Parkway	
Nashville	10.70	17.22	11	Opry Mills Drive	Serves Opry Mills, General Jackson Showboat, and Grand Ole Opry House
Nashville	12.06	19.41	12	Music Valley Drive / McGavock Pike – Opryland Hotel, Convention Center	
Nashville	13.73– 14.04	22.10– 22.60	Duke-Fuqua Memorial Bridge over the Cumberland River		
Nashville	14.57	23.45	14	US 31E north (Gallatin Pike / SR 6) – Madison	CW end of US 31E/SR 6 overlap; signed CCW as exits 14A (north) and 14B (south)
Nashville	15.05– 16.79	24.22– 27.02	15	US 31E south (Ellington Parkway / SR 6) / Briarville Road	CCW end of US 31E/SR 6 overlap; signed as exits 15A (Briarville Rd.) and 15B (US 31E)
Nashville	15.05– 16.79	24.22– 27.02	16A	I-65 north – Louisville	CCW exit signed as exit 15C and is part of exit 15; I-65 exit 90
Nashville	15.05– 16.79	24.22– 27.02	16B	US 31W / US 41 (Dickerson Pike / SR 11) / I-65 south – Nashville	CCW exit signed as exit 16; I-65 exit 90
Nashville	17.89	28.79	17	Brick Church Pike	
Nashville	18.23	29.34	18	I-24 – Clarksville, Nashville	Signed as exits 18A (west) and 18B (east); I-24 exit 43
Nashville	19.79	31.85	19	US 431 (Whites Creek Pike / SR 65)	
Nashville	20.92	33.67	21	US 41A (Clarksville Pike / SR 112)	CCW exit signed as exits 21A (north) and 21B (south)
Nashville	24.00	38.62	24	SR 12 – Ashland City	
Nashville	25.66	41.30	25	County Hospital Road	
Nashville	25.88– 26.01	41.65– 41.86	Andrew B. Gibson Bridge over the Cumberland River		
Nashville	26.89	43.28	26	Centennial Boulevard	CW exit signed as exits 26A (east) and 26B (west); serves John C. Tune Airport and Riverbend Maximum Security Institution
Nashville	28.52	45.90	27	I-40 – Nashville, Memphis	CCW end of freeway; signed as exits 27A (east) and 27B (west); no CW exit numbers; I-40 exit 215; Briley Pkwy. becomes White Bridge Pike
Nashville	28.67	46.14		US 70 (Charlotte Pike / SR 24)	
Nashville	30.69	49.39		US 70S (Harding Pike / SR 1)	CCW end of SR 155; White Bridge Pike becomes Woodmont Blvd. (see above)
Nashville	1.000 mi = 1.609 km; 1.000 km = 0.621 mi: Concurrency terminus				

== See also ==
- List of state routes in Tennessee
