= Opryland =

Opryland may refer to the following in Nashville, Tennessee, United States:

- Opryland USA, a defunct theme park
- Gaylord Opryland Resort & Convention Center, formerly known as Opryland Hotel
