= Earl Swensson =

American architect (1930–2022)

- Born: July 28, 1930; Nashville, Tennessee, U.S.
- Died: January 20, 2022 (aged 91); Nashville, Tennessee, U.S.
- Education: Virginia Tech; University of Illinois
- Occupation: Architect
- Spouse: Sue Swensson
- Children: 3

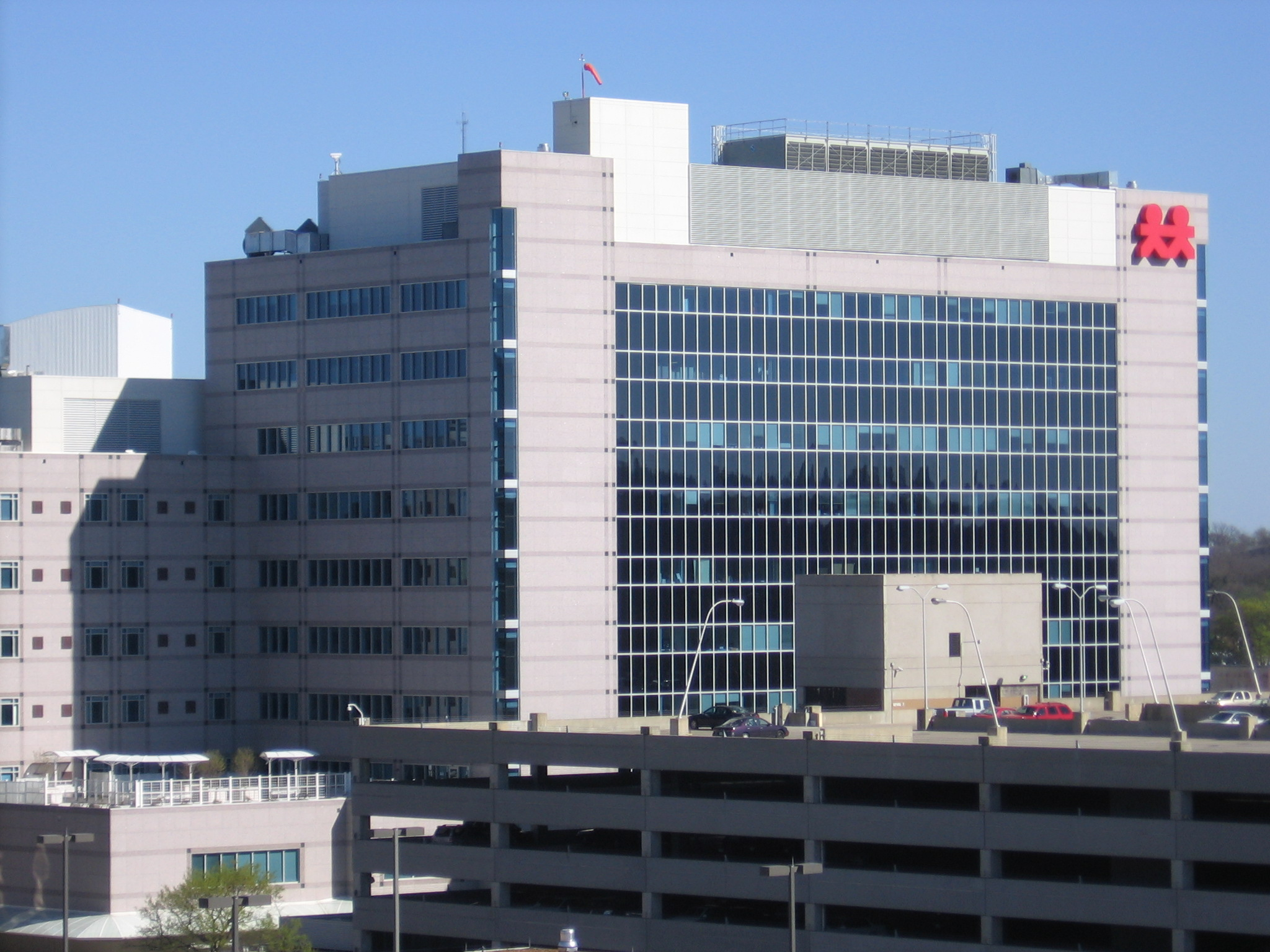
Monroe Carell Jr. Children's Hospital at Vanderbilt

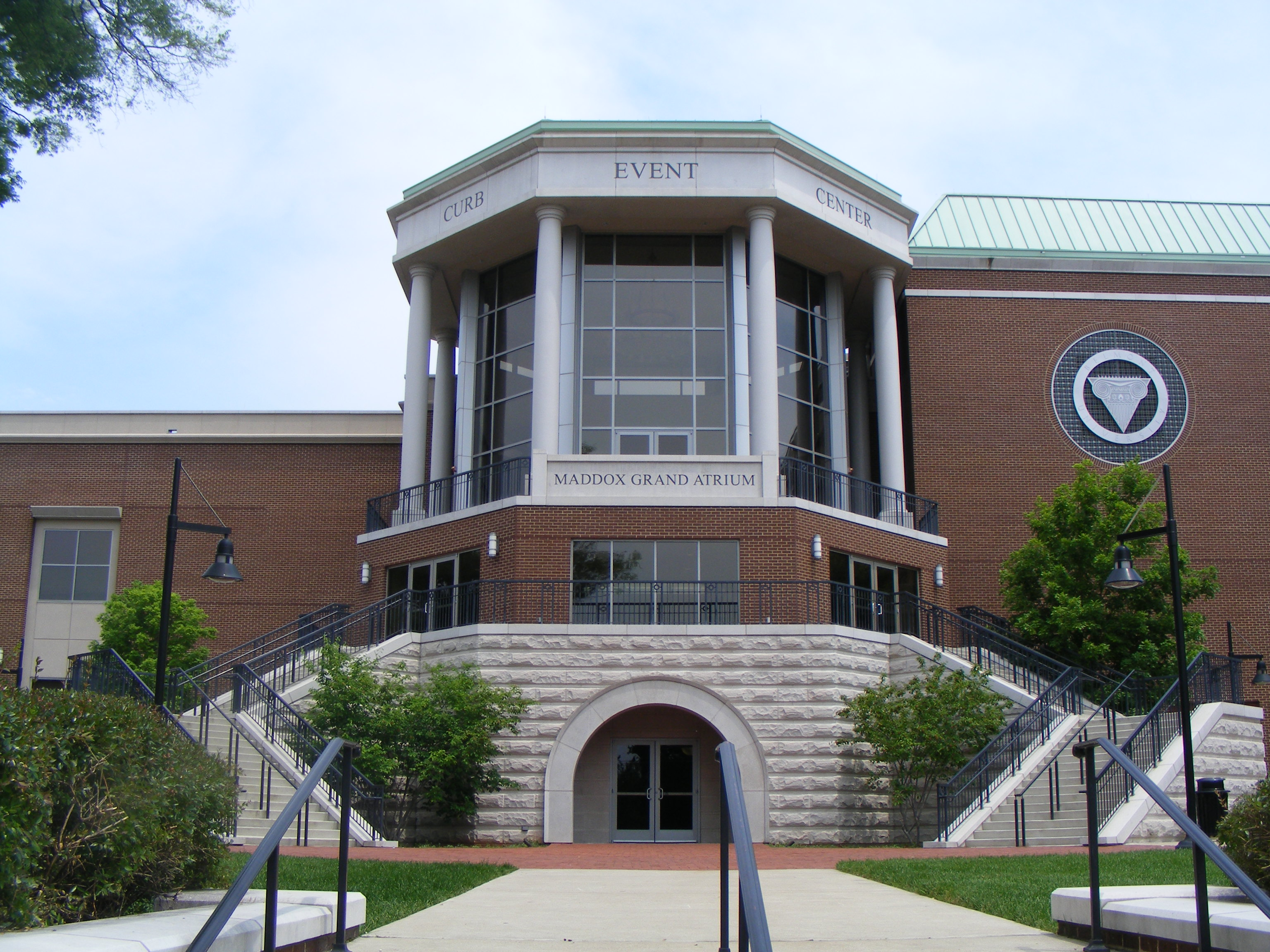
Curb Event Center at Belmont University

Earl Simcox Swensson, FAIA (July 28, 1930 – January 20, 2022) was an American architect who was the founder of Earl Swensson Associates (ESA), an architectural firm based in Nashville, Tennessee. The firm has designed many notable buildings in Nashville, including the Batman Building, Centennial Medical Center and Opryland Hotel (including its three expansions).

== Early life ==
Earl Swensson was born in Nashville, Tennessee, in 1930. His father worked as an engineer for DuPont.

Swensson graduated from Virginia Tech, where he earned a bachelor's degree in architecture. He also earned a master's degree in architecture from the University of Illinois.

== Career ==
Swensson began his career in Nashville in 1951, when he was a student draftsman for Hart & McBryde. Swensson went to Chicago, where he worked for Perkins and Will, only to move back to Nashville.

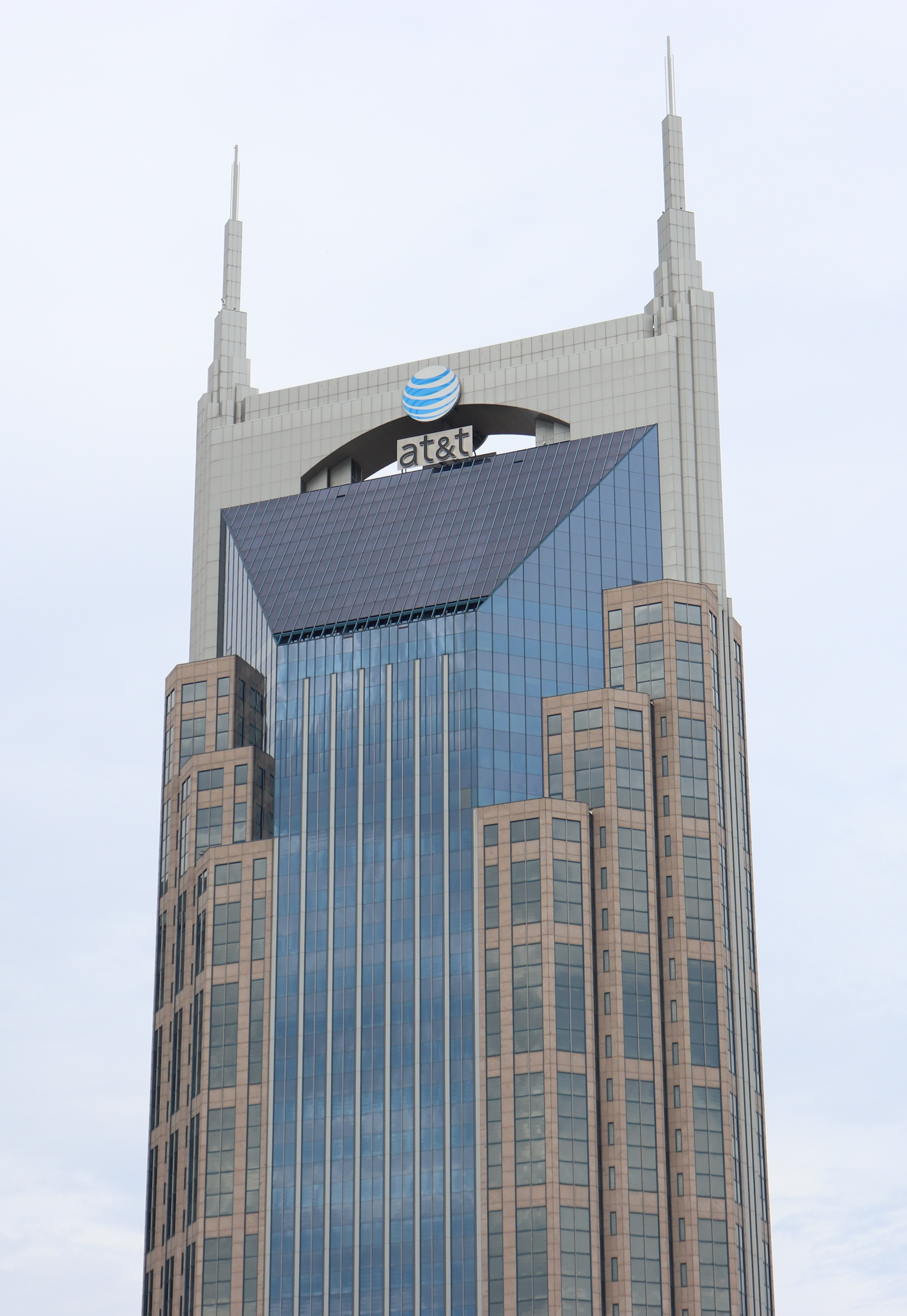
AT&T Building, Nashville TN

Swensson founded Earl Swensson Associates (ESa), an architectural firm based in Nashville, in 1961. The firm moved to a new building at 2303 21st Avenue South in 1975. By 1998, his office was in the Loews Vanderbilt Hotel Office Building in Midtown Nashville which his namesake firm designed. In 2015, the firm, now referred to as ESa, moved to The Gulch.

Swensson's firm has designed several landmarks in Downtown Nashville, including the Batman Building and the Wildhorse Saloon. He also designed the Gaylord Opryland Resort & Convention Center. Other significant facilities designed by ESa are the Curb Event Center on the campus of Belmont University and the Monroe Carell Jr. Children's Hospital at Vanderbilt. By 2010, 80% of his practice's work focused on designing health facilities.

Swensson was an adjunct professor of architecture at his alma mater, Virginia Tech, in 1971–1972.

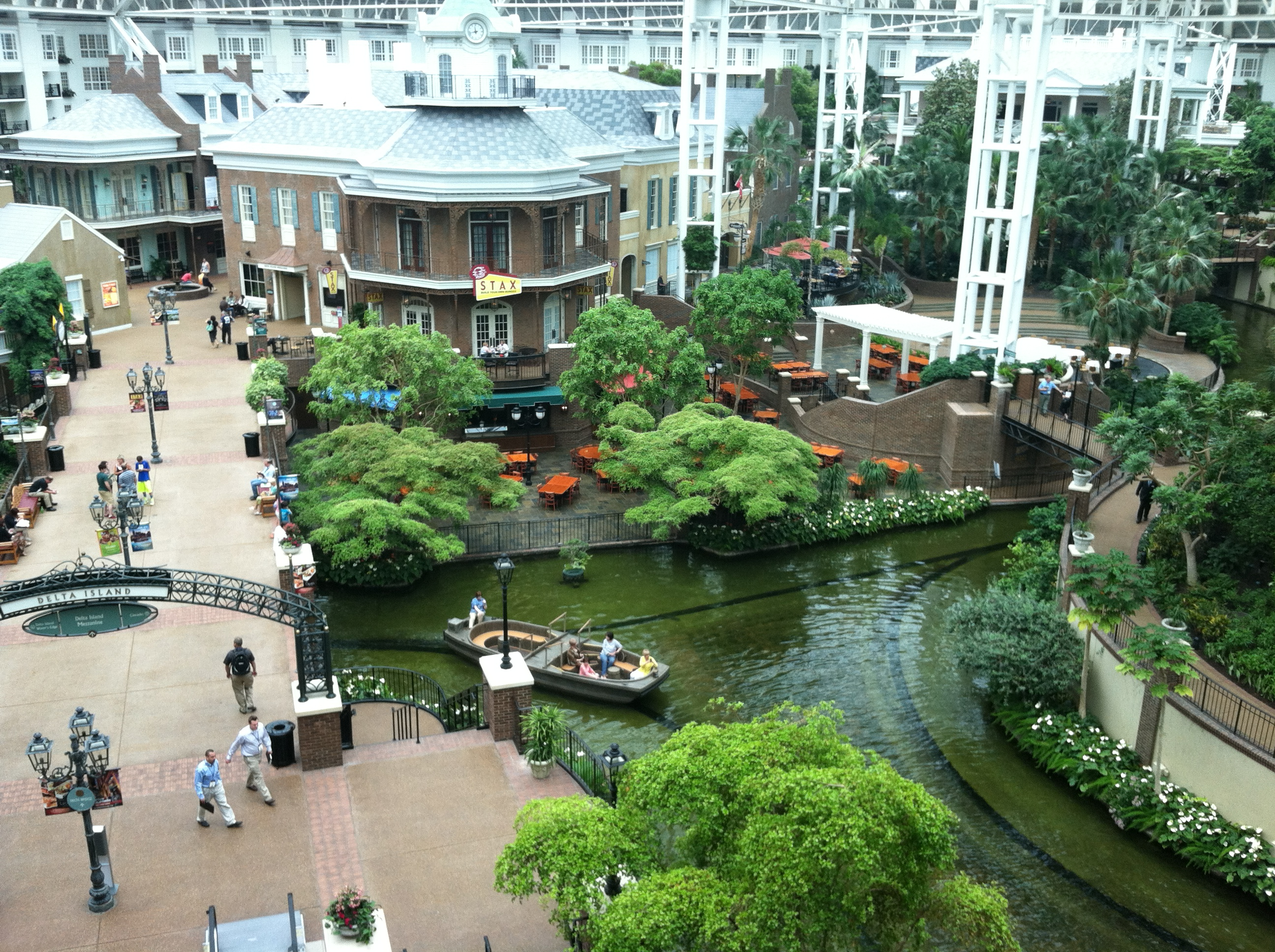
Gaylord Opryland Hotel and Convention Center

== Personal life ==
Swensson had a wife, Sue, and three children. He died in Nashville on January 20, 2022, at the age of 91.
