= John C. Tune Airport =

Airport serving Nashville, Tennessee, United States

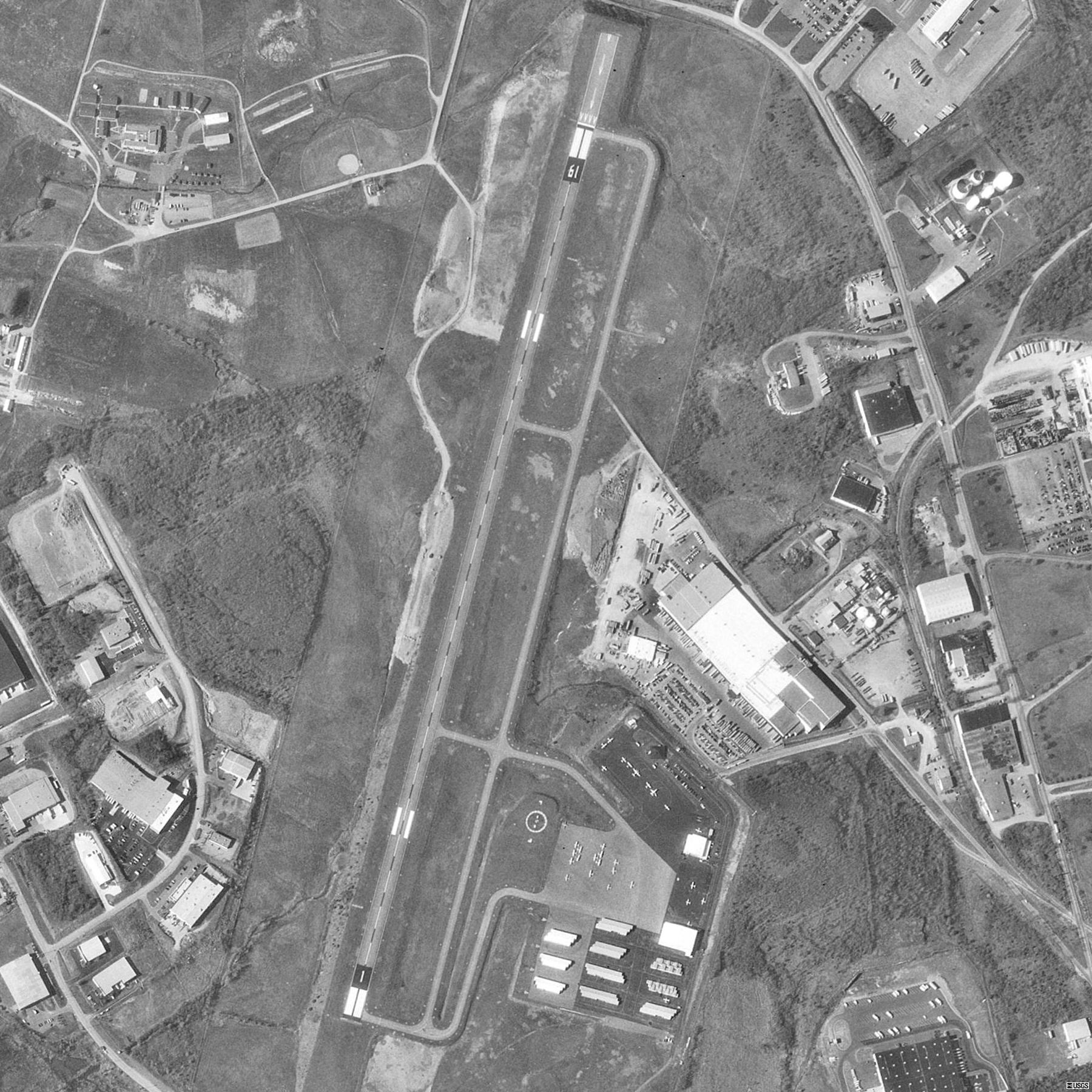
- USGS aerial image, 2008
- IATA: none; ICAO: KJWN; FAA LID: JWN

Summary
- Airport type: Public
- Owner: Metropolitan Nashville Airport Authority
- Serves: Nashville, Tennessee
- Elevation AMSL: 501 ft (153 m)
- Coordinates: 36°10′56″N 086°53′12″W

Map
- Location of airport in Tennessee KJWN/JWN (the United States)

Runways
Direction	Length		Surface
Direction	ft	m	Surface
2/20	6,001	1,829	Asphalt

Statistics (2023)
- Aircraft operations (year ending 8/3/2023): 64,000
- Based aircraft: 190
- Source: Federal Aviation Administration

John C. Tune Airport (ICAO: KJWN, FAA LID: JWN) is a public airport located in the western portion of the city of Nashville in Davidson County, Tennessee, United States. It is owned by the Metropolitan Nashville Airport Authority, located approximately one mile (1.6 km) off of Briley Parkway in the Cockrill Bend area. It is a Class D airport.

Although most U.S. airports use the same three-letter location identifier for the FAA and IATA, John C. Tune Airport is assigned JWN by the FAA but has no designation from the IATA.

== History ==
Tune Airport is named in honor of John Childress Tune, a Nashville attorney, civic leader, longtime aviation enthusiast and one of the principal developers of the modern aviation authority concept. He was also a former chairman of the Metropolitan Nashville Airport Authority. Planning for the construction of Tune Airport began in 1965 under Nashville's former Department of Aviation as a "reliever airport" designed to provide additional capacity at Nashville International Airport (Berry Field). The Department of Aviation received a state grant to purchase the Cockrill Bend property, and construction for the airport began in 1983. The airport opened in July 1986. The current terminal was built in 1995 and renovated in 2015.

On March 3, 2020, the airport suffered significant tornado damage to its terminal and other buildings, including 17 hangars on the property; more than 90 aircraft parked at the airport—including charter jets, smaller airplanes, and a newsgathering helicopter operated by CBS affiliate WTVF (channel 5)—were destroyed.

== Facilities and aircraft ==
John C. Tune Airport covers an area of 374 acres (151 ha) at an elevation of 501 feet (153 m) above mean sea level. It has one asphalt paved runway designated 2/20 which measures 6,001 by 100 feet (1,829. x 30 m). For the 12-month period ending August 3, 2023, the airport had 64,000 aircraft operations, an average of 175 per day: 96% general aviation, 4% air taxi and <1% military. At that time there were 190 aircraft based at this airport: 136 single-engine, 26 multi-engine, 17 jet and 11 helicopter.

Corporate Flight Management provides Fixed-Base Operator services for the airport. JWN has 120 T-hangars, plus 21,000 square feet (2,000 m^{2}) and 19,000 square feet (1,800 m^{2}) box hangars that include offices. Aircraft parking and apron space totals 360,000 square feet (33,000 m^{2}), which can accommodate 55 tie-down aircraft. The airport has a precision instrument landing approach into Runway 20. Both Runways 2 and 20 have non-precision instrument approaches.

JWN is financially self-supporting, although some improvements are made with the assistance of state and federal grant money.

== Services ==
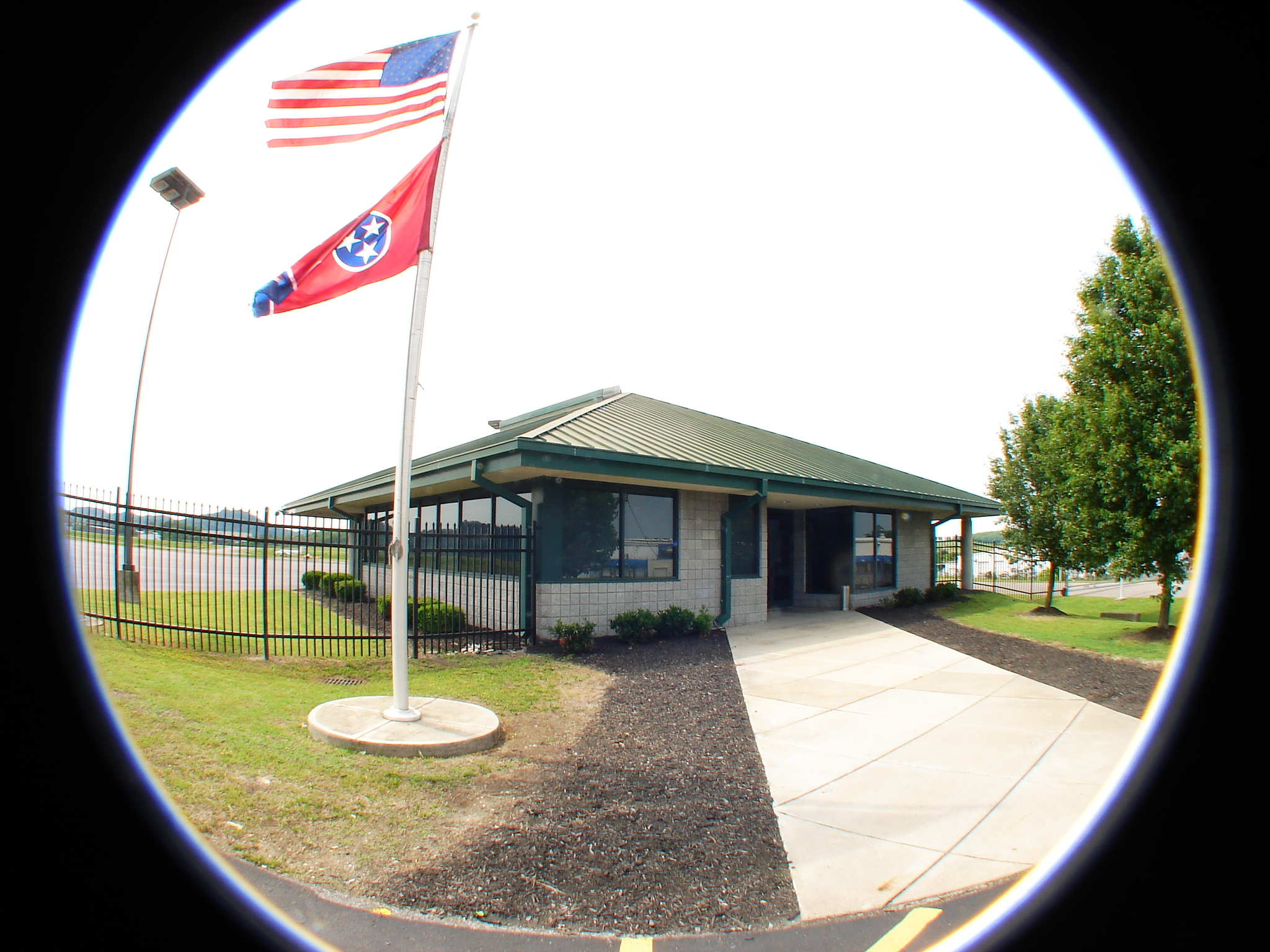

John C. Tune Airport provides:

- 24-hour personnel service
- Avgas
- Jet fuel
- Aircraft and helicopter maintenance
- Private and commercial pilot certification
- Lasergrade testing
- Instrument rating courses
- Flight instructor certification courses
- Flight simulator training
- Helicopter pilot training
- Lavatory disposal

== Renovations ==
John C. Tune's terminal received a significant renovation that was completed in 2005. The 3,600-square-foot (330 m^{2}) updated terminal includes a pilot's lounge, conference room, flight planning room, vending area and pilot supply shop. Additional landscaping and parking renovations were completed in 2009.

== Accidents and incidents ==
- On March 4, 2024, a Piper PA-32R crashed about 3 miles south of John Tune Airport just off Interstate 40 after declaring and attempting an emergency landing at the airport because of engine problems. There was a post-crash fire. All 5 occupants perished.
- On Saturday October 4th 2025 a 35 year old skydiving instructor, jumping from a plane operated by Go Skydive Nashville (based at the John C. Tune Airport) died in an accident, presumed to have fallen from the sky without a parachute. His student was rescued alive from a tree in Nashville, and the three other skydivers landed safely.

== See also ==
- List of airports in Tennessee
