= Opry Mills =

Shopping mall in Nashville, Tennessee, U.S.

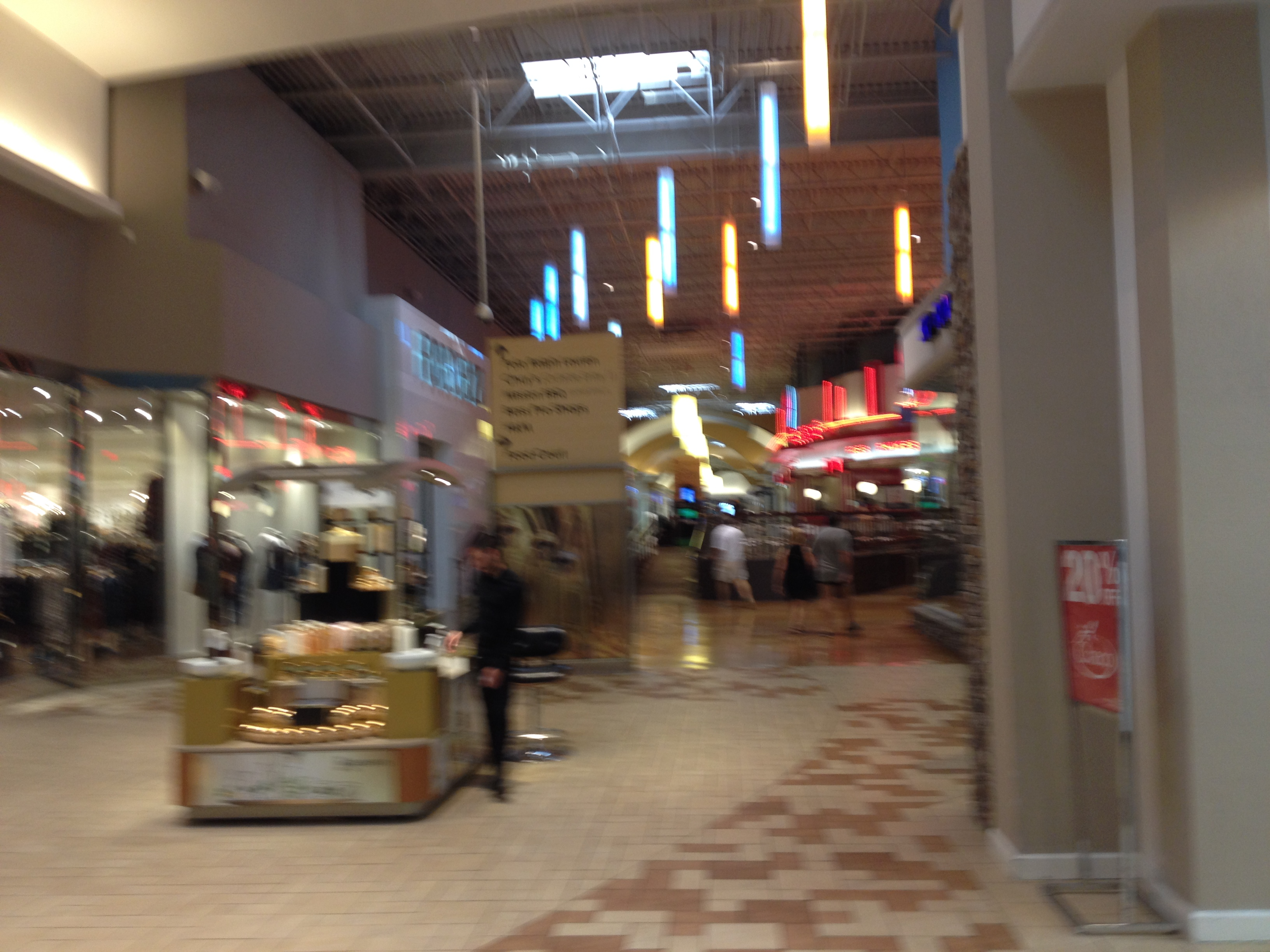
- Interior view (August 2016)
- Location: Nashville, Tennessee, U.S.
- Coordinates: 36°12′11″N 86°41′34″W
- Opened: May 11, 2000; 26 years ago
- Renovated: 2010–2012
- Developer: The Mills Corporation; Gaylord Entertainment Company
- Manager: Simon Premium Outlets; The Mills: A Simon Company
- Owner: Simon Property Group
- Architect: Cooper Carry; Edwards Technologies; Scenery West
- Num. of stores: 200+ (at peak)
- Num. of anchor tenants: 14 (at peak)
- Floor area: 1,168,641 square feet (108,570 m^{2})
- Floors: 1
- Parking: Parking lot
- Website: www.simon.com/mall/opry-mills/
- Building details
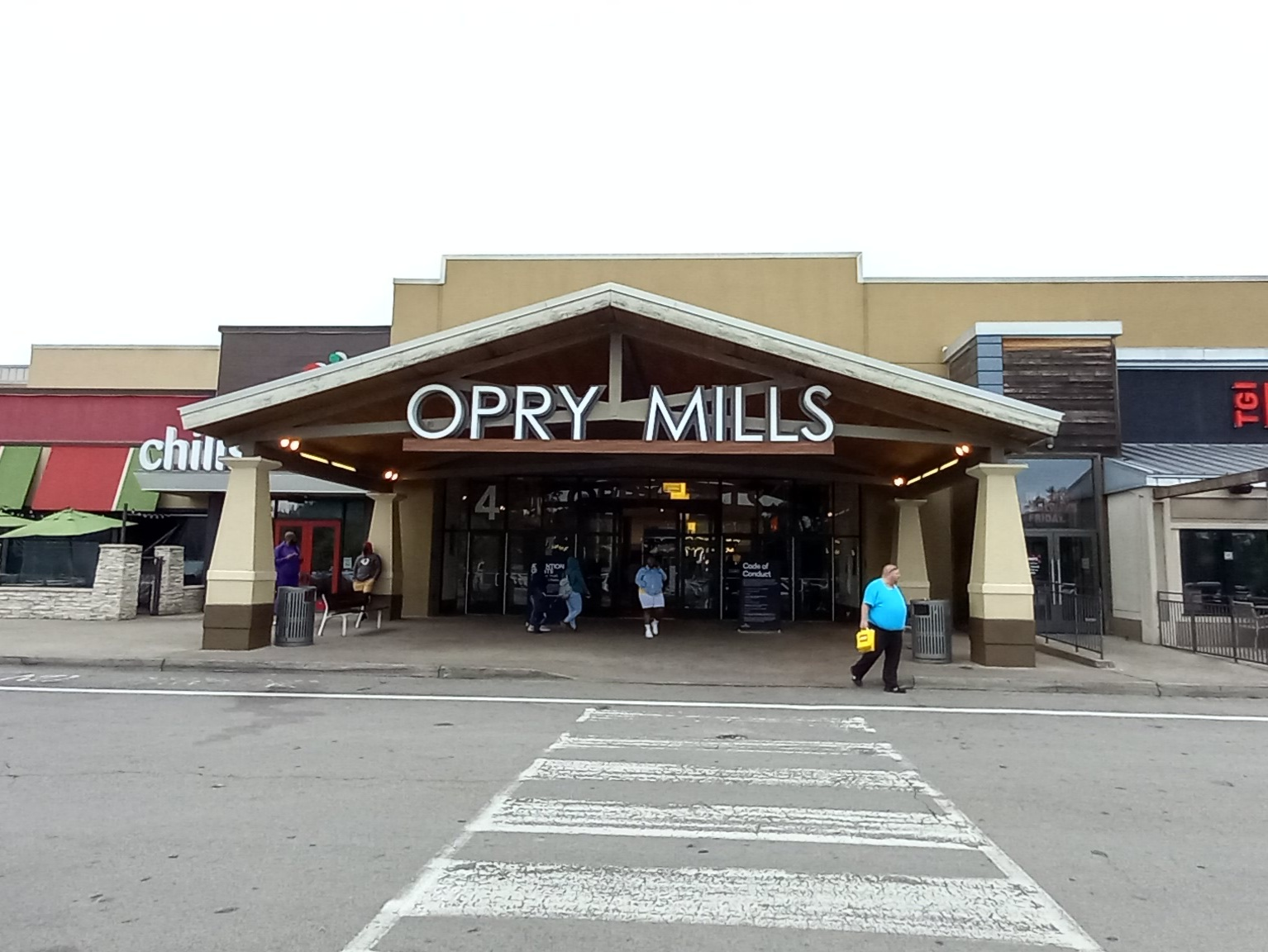
- Entrance 4 (May 2022)

General information
- Status: Operational
- Construction started: October 1998; 28 years ago
- Completed: 2000

Renovating team
- Architect: Cooper Carry
- Renovating firm: Simon Property Group

Opry Mills is a super-regional outlet mall in Nashville, Tennessee, United States. The mall was developed and operated by the Mills Corporation and the Gaylord Entertainment Company (now Ryman Hospitality Properties) until April 2007, when the Mills Corporation was acquired by Simon Property Group. It opened on May 11, 2000, on the former site of Opryland Themepark. The mall is adjacent to the Grand Ole Opry House and the Gaylord Opryland Resort & Convention Center.

== History ==
=== 1997–2004: Development, opening, and early years ===
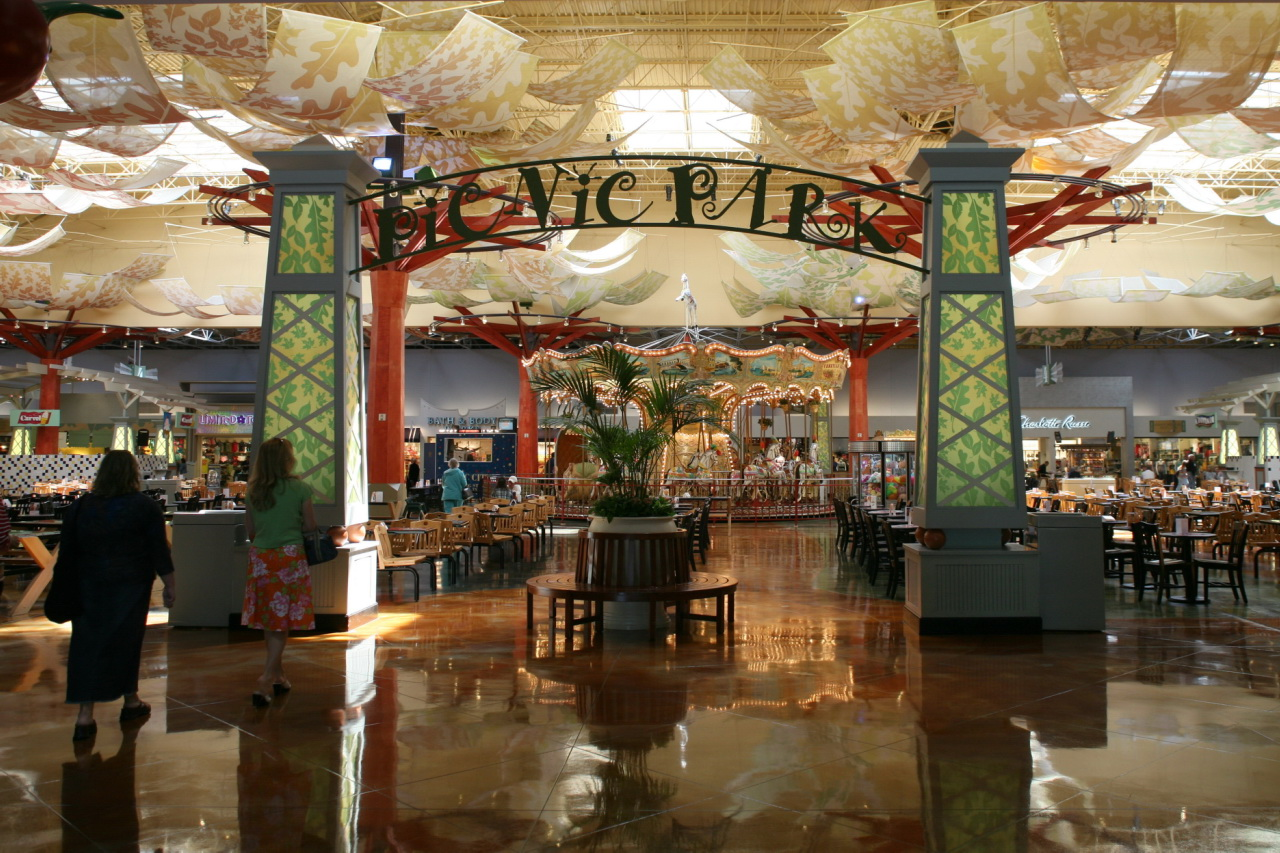
The Picnic Park food court in May 2007

The current site of Opry Mills was originally Opryland USA, a popular theme park which had its grand opening on May 27, 1972. In November 1997, the Gaylord Entertainment Company formed a joint venture with the Arlington, Virginia-based Mills Corporation and announced on November 4, 1997, that the entire property would close for two years for a $275 million redevelopment known as "Destination Opryland". The property would include the Opry Mills mall, as well as a marina on the Cumberland River near the General Jackson's dock, a TNN/CMT broadcast center with studio tours, a renovated Grand Ole Opry House (including a new stage design and new seating), and a revamped Opry Plaza that would feature retail, dining, and entertainment venues. Following this announcement, Opryland USA permanently closed its doors on December 31, 1997.

The mall began construction in October 1998, with the demolition of Opryland USA. Opry Mills had its grand opening on May 11, 2000. An estimated 100,000 people attended on the opening day alone, leading to approximately $3 million in sales. A survey of 3,100 visitors during the opening weekend (May 11 to 14) revealed that more than 30% were tourists or conventioneers traveling from more than 50 miles (80 km) away. These opening weekend visitors represented 47 states and 23 foreign countries, which supported Mills and Gaylord's claims that the mall would become a primary tourist attraction for Nashville. Original tenants included Regal Cinemas Opry Mills 20 & IMAX, Saks Off 5th, Rainforest Cafe, and Bass Pro Shops Outdoor World. The architect for the mall was Cooper Carry, Edwards Technologies, Inc., and Scenery West. In its first year, nearly 3,000 bus tours have delivered shoppers to the mall.

The Mills Corp. held a 66.7% interest in Opry Mills, while the Gaylord Entertainment Company handled the remaining 33.3% during early operations. In December 2002, Gaylord sold its one-third stake in the mall back to Mills for $30.8 million in cash, as well as the assumption of $56 million in debt, giving Mills full ownership of the property. In October 2004, German-based KanAm Grund Group acquired 50% of the Mills' shares in Opry Mills for approximately $158 million. The mall's Jillian's would be converted into Dave & Buster's amid a $47 million acquisition deal.

=== 2007–2018: Simon Property Group ===
In February 2007, The Mills Corp.'s portfolio, including its 50% interest in Opry Mills, would be acquired by Simon Property Group and Farallon Capital Management. This was because Mills was financially struggling by May 2006. The acquisition was completed in April 2007, and the Mills Corporation was rebranded The Mills: A Simon Company.

==== 2010 Tennessee flood damage ====
Opry Mills temporarily closed in May 2010 after the water from the Tennessee floods reached as high as 10 feet (3.0 m) inside the mall. The entire property had to undergo environmental remediation. In September 2010, restoration work was halted while litigation over insurance claims played out in court, and many of the mall's retailers sought locations elsewhere in the area, either permanently or until the mall was restored and reopened. In March and November 2011, it was announced that Barnes & Noble Booksellers and Borders Bookstore would not reopen. B&N terminated its lease, while Borders went defunct in the U.S. The initial reopening date was set for August 2011, but that self-imposed deadline was not met due to the litigation. The architect for the mall's reconstruction was also Cooper Carry.

On April 12, 2011, mall officials announced that a financing deal had been reached to resume reconstruction of Opry Mills. In late January 2012, it was announced that a mixture of over 60 returning retailers and brand-new outlet additions were preparing for the mall's grand opening; new tenants would include Crazy 8, Polo Ralph Lauren Factory, Michael Kors, J.Crew Factory, Coach Factory Store, Express, and Jones New York Outlet.

In March 2012, Simon Property Group acquired full control of the property's management by buying out Farallon's stake in the Mills portfolio for $1.5 billion. The mall reopened on March 29, 2012, after two years of repairs, with some of the anchor retailers opening sooner, such as the 27,500 sq ft (2,550 m^{2}) Saks Off 5th on March 23, 2012. The property was given a facelift during the remediation and a modern relaunch campaign, including a new logo. The reopening also included a reorganization of the tenant mix and neighborhoods, converting them into "themed zones" that included Fashion, Children's, and Entertainment. Buckle and Claire's-owned Icing would debut in late spring 2014.

True Religion Outlet would open in April 2014. In late October 2016, three new stores—Francesca's, Abercrombie & Fitch Outlet, and Swarovski Crystal–were announced to debut at the mall. Madame Tussauds opened on April 14, 2017, in the former Barnes & Noble space, with the Opry Mills location being the brand's first music-themed attraction. Lindt Chocolate Shop opened on November 17, 2017.

Simon Property Group had been awarded $200 million in insurance coverage from the flood, but in May 2018, the Tennessee Supreme Court let stand a lower court's ruling that stripped $150 million of that coverage, as the mall had been built in a known flood zone.

=== 2019–present ===
Concourse before flood (November 2008)

In October 2019, new stores arrived, including Vans Outlet, Helzberg Diamonds Outlet, Samsonite Outlet and Popeyes Louisiana Kitchen. In March 2020, all Simon properties in the U.S., including Opry Mills, closed temporarily due to the COVID-19 pandemic. The mall reopened two months later under strict social distancing restrictions, while also celebrating its 20th anniversary. In September 2020, it was announced that Bed Bath & Beyond would close permanently at the end of the year.

In late December 2025, Fit2 Run (first location in Tennessee), JD Sports, Pono, and Royal Diamonds (first location in Nashville) opened at Opry Mills, and the mall's Boot Barn was expanded. The Steve Madden store was remodeled. Tennessee's first Slick City Action Park opened at the mall in late January 2026, alongside AJ's Restaurant. Karl Lagerfeld and OFFLINE by Aerie would open at the mall in April and May 2026, respectively.

In September 2026, it was announced that Fabletics would open in October, followed by Ulta Beauty in November. Construction on Reclectic has started, while OFFLINE by Aerie has debuted. Carter's relocated next to Rainforest Cafe.

== Gallery ==
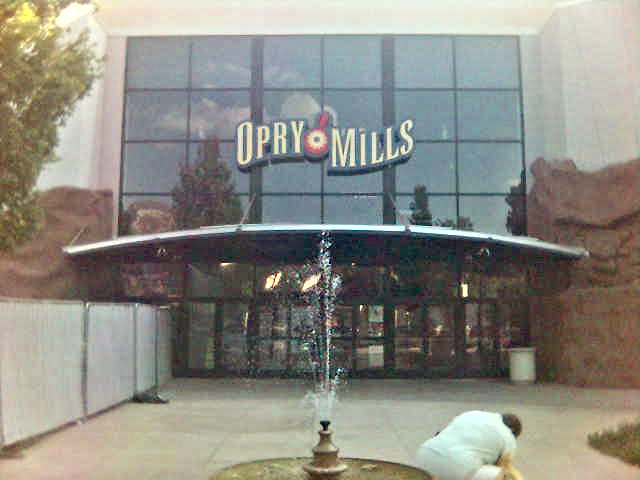
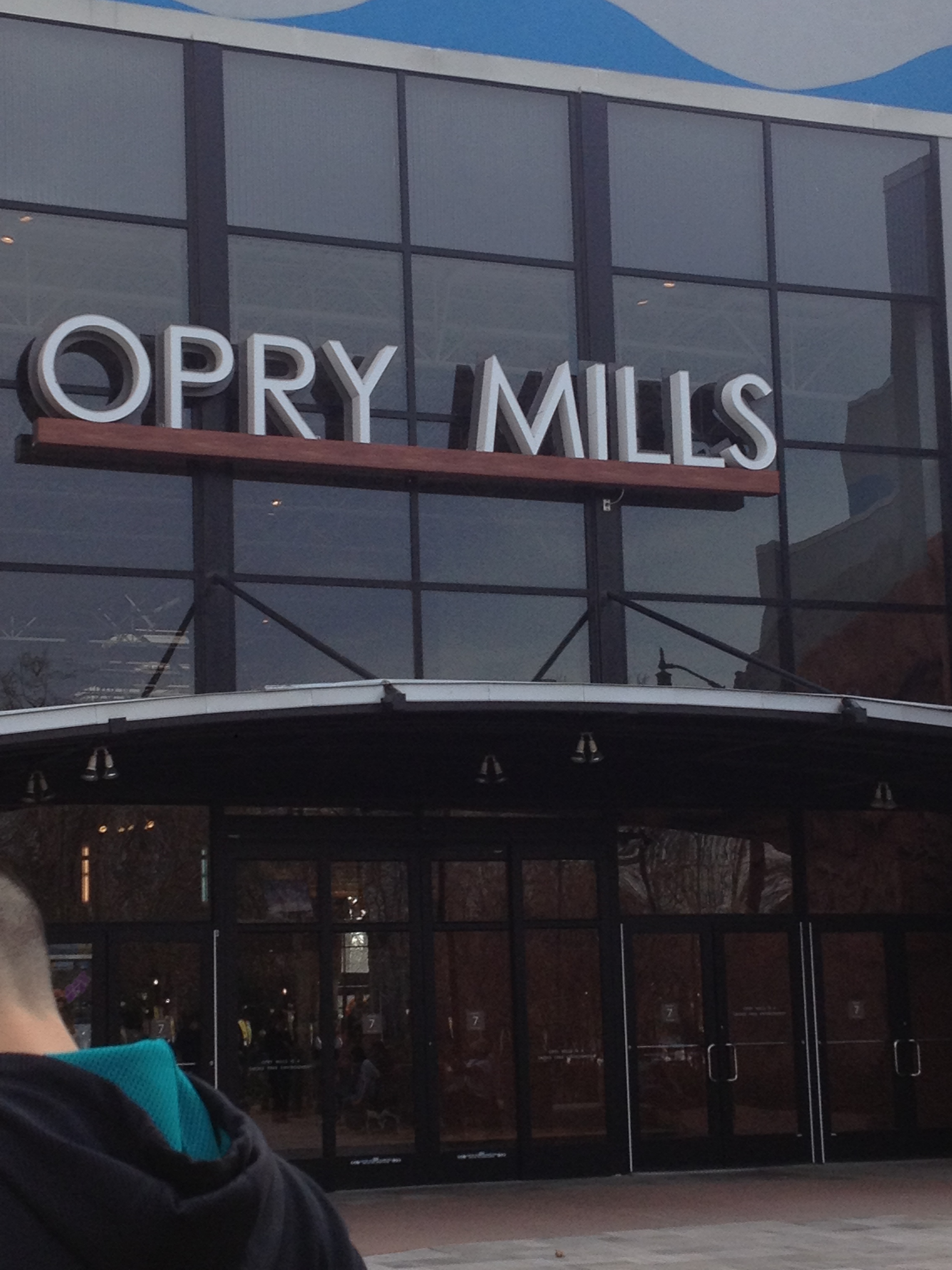
Main entrance to Opry Mills before flood in June 2005 (left) and after flood in April 2013 (right)
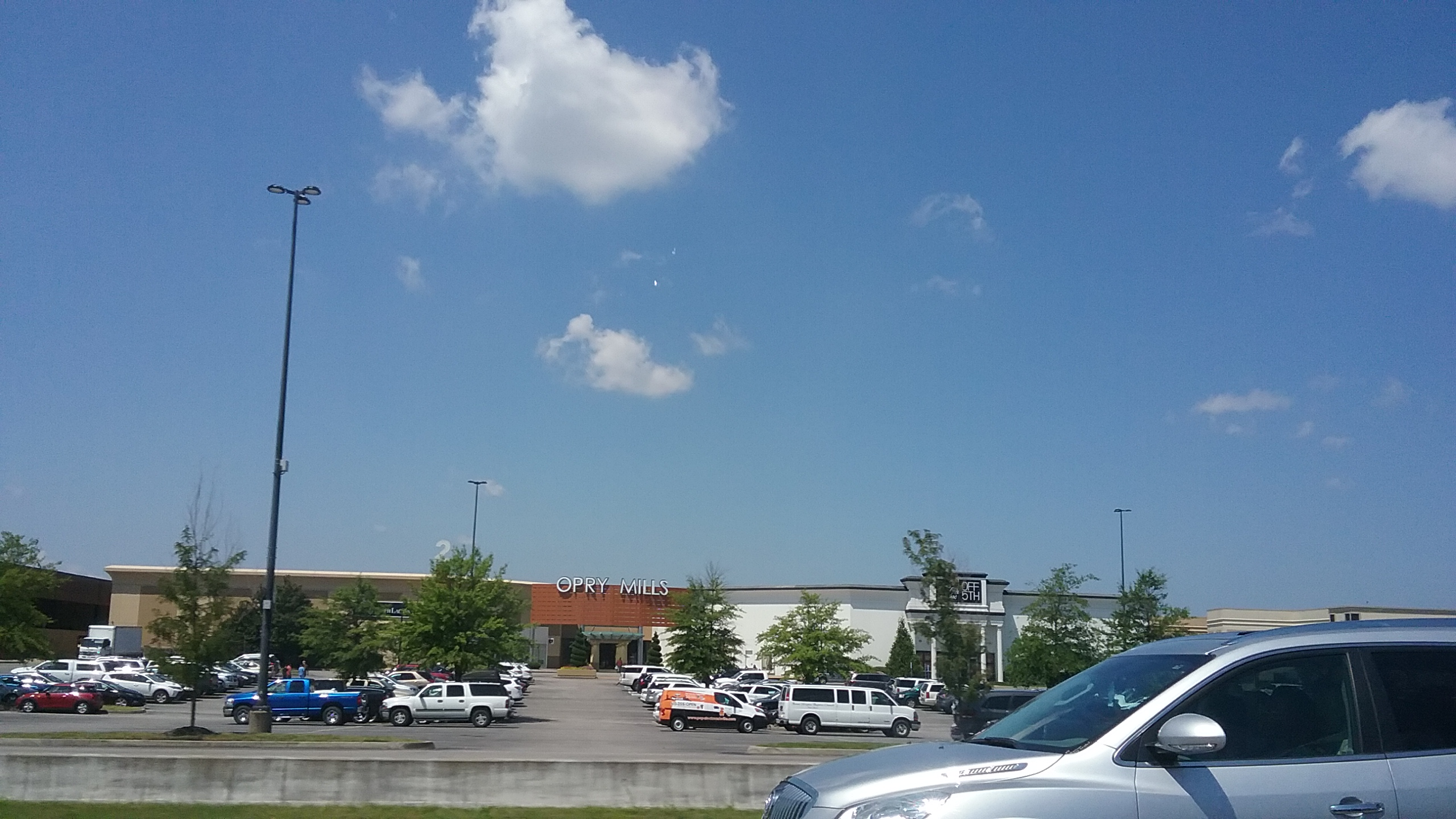
The mall as viewed from the highway - July 2017

== See also ==
- Colorado Mills, which was damaged by a hailstorm and also underwent reconstruction by Simon Property Group
