= 2010 Tennessee floods =

May 2010 natural disaster in Tennessee, U.S.

May 2010 Tennessee floods
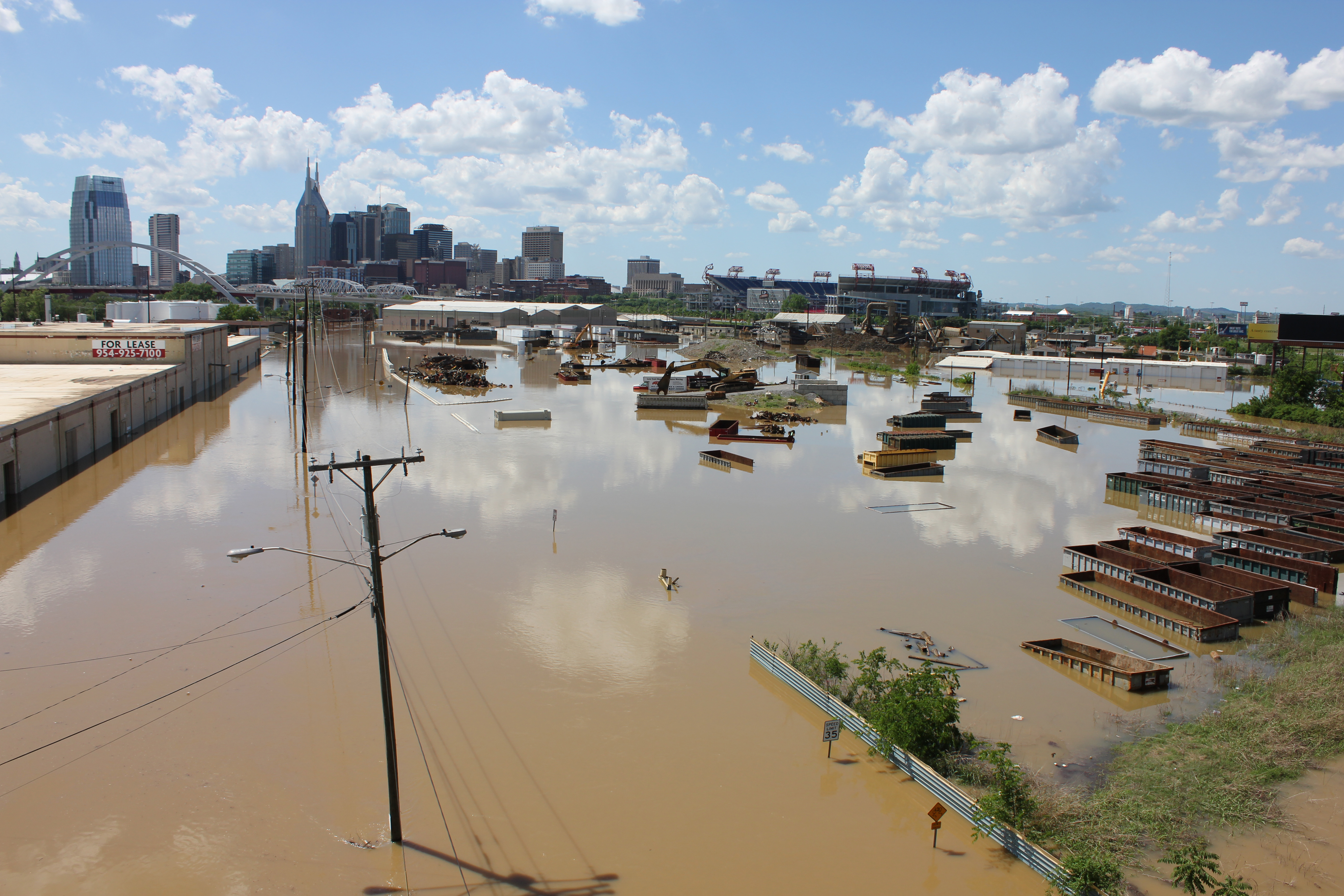
- Nashville, Tennessee, suffered extensive flooding, especially in areas close to the Cumberland River, Mill Creek, and Harpeth River.

Meteorological history
- Duration: May 1–7, 2010

Overall effects
- Fatalities: 31 dead in TN, KY and MS
- Damage: $2.3 billion (2010 USD)
- Areas affected: Tennessee, south central Kentucky, northern Mississippi

Severe floods occurred in Middle Tennessee, West Tennessee, south-central and western Kentucky, and northern Mississippi areas of the United States as the result of torrential rains on May 1 and 2, 2010. Floods from these rains affected the area for several days afterwards, resulting in a number of deaths and widespread property damage.

Two-day rain totals in some areas were greater than 19 inches (480 mm). The Cumberland River crested at 51.86 feet (15.81 m) in Nashville, a level not seen since 1937, which was before the U.S. Army Corps of Engineers flood control measures were in place. All-time record crests were observed on the Cumberland River at Clarksville, the Duck River at Centerville and Hurricane Mills, the Buffalo River at Lobelville, the Harpeth River at Kingston Springs and Bellevue, and the Red River at Port Royal.

== Meteorology ==
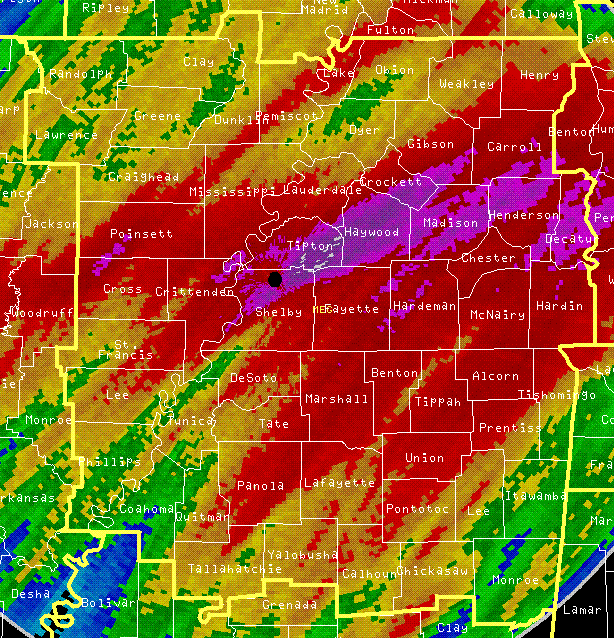
Radar estimated precipitation showing West Tennessee, including the Forked Deer River

According to the Memphis Office of the National Weather Service:

A significant weather system brought very heavy rain and severe thunderstorms from Saturday, May 1 through Sunday morning, May 2. A stalled frontal boundary coupled with very moist air streaming northward from the Gulf set the stage for repeated rounds of heavy rainfall. Many locations along the I-40 corridor across western and middle Tennessee reported in excess of 10 to 15 inches, with some locations receiving up to 20 inches according to Doppler weather radar estimates.

Several rainfall records in the Nashville area were broken during the rain event. 13.57 inches (345 mm) fell during the two-day period of May 1–2, doubling the record of 6.68 inches (170 mm) set in September 1979 during the passage of the remnants of Hurricane Frederic. On May 2 alone, 7.25 inches (184 mm) of rain fell, including 7.20 inches (183 mm) during a 12-hour period and 5.57 inches (141 mm) in a 6-hour period, eclipsing records set on September 13, 1979. The event also set a record for wettest May on record, surpassing the record set in May 1983 with 11.84 inches (301 mm).

Heavy rain also affected large portions of Arkansas, northern Mississippi and southern Kentucky. In Arkansas, over 5 inches (130 mm) fell in the Little Rock area, up to 8 inches (200 mm) in West Memphis and over 10 inches (250 mm) in northeastern Arkansas closer to the Mississippi River. Similar amounts were recorded across western and southern Kentucky where over 7 inches (180 mm) fell in the Hopkinsville area and up to 4 inches (100 mm) across the Missouri Bootheel. In addition to the heavy rain, moist air and ample instability contributed to the generation of multiple tornadoes affecting the same areas, which killed five people: four in Mississippi during the early hours of May 2, and one in Arkansas during the evening of April 30.

== Casualties ==
Twenty-one deaths were recorded in Tennessee, including ten in Davidson County, which includes Nashville. Of the ten dead in Davidson County, "four victims were found in their homes, two were in cars and four were outdoors."

Floods killed six people in northern Mississippi, and four deaths were reported in Kentucky.

Mississippi deaths occurred in the following counties:

- Alcorn County – one dead
- Benton County – two dead
- Lafayette County – one dead
- Lee County – one dead in hydroplaning accident on U.S. Route 45 in Tupelo
- Union County – one dead in hydroplaning accident on Mississippi Route 78

== Damage ==
At least 30 counties in Tennessee were declared major disaster areas by the federal government, with 52 applying to receive this status. This translates to about 31% of Tennessee being designated a major disaster area.

=== Middle Tennessee ===
Almost all schools in the area were closed including Metropolitan Nashville Public Schools, some for a week or more. Many roads were damaged by water erosion. Interstate 40 west of Nashville had numerous spots that had been inundated. Repair work on I-40 continued for several months.

==== Nashville and Davidson County ====
The first site of major flooding was along Mill Creek in southeastern Davidson County, which was affected by a flash flood on May 1. The creek quickly spilled over its banks, and completely covered Interstate 24 near Antioch, killing one person in a car. A TDOT traffic camera captured footage of a large portable building being swept away from Lighthouse Christian School and coming to rest among the traffic on I-24, which was broadcast live on local television. Another person was killed along Mill Creek while attempting to tube the floodwaters.

Flooding on the Cumberland River damaged the Grand Ole Opry House, Gaylord Opryland Resort & Convention Center, Opry Mills, Bridgestone Arena (home to NHL team Nashville Predators), and LP Field (home to NFL team Tennessee Titans) with several feet of water.

Grand Ole Opry performances were moved to other venues in the Nashville area, with the Ryman Auditorium serving as the primary venue when available. Other venues hosting the Opry include the War Memorial Auditorium, TPAC's Andrew Jackson Hall, Nashville Municipal Auditorium, Lipscomb University's Allen Arena and the Two Rivers Baptist Church. Both the Ryman and War Memorial Auditoriums were previous homes to the Opry. None of these facilities were affected by the floods. The Grand Ole Opry House reopened to much fanfare on September 28, 2010.

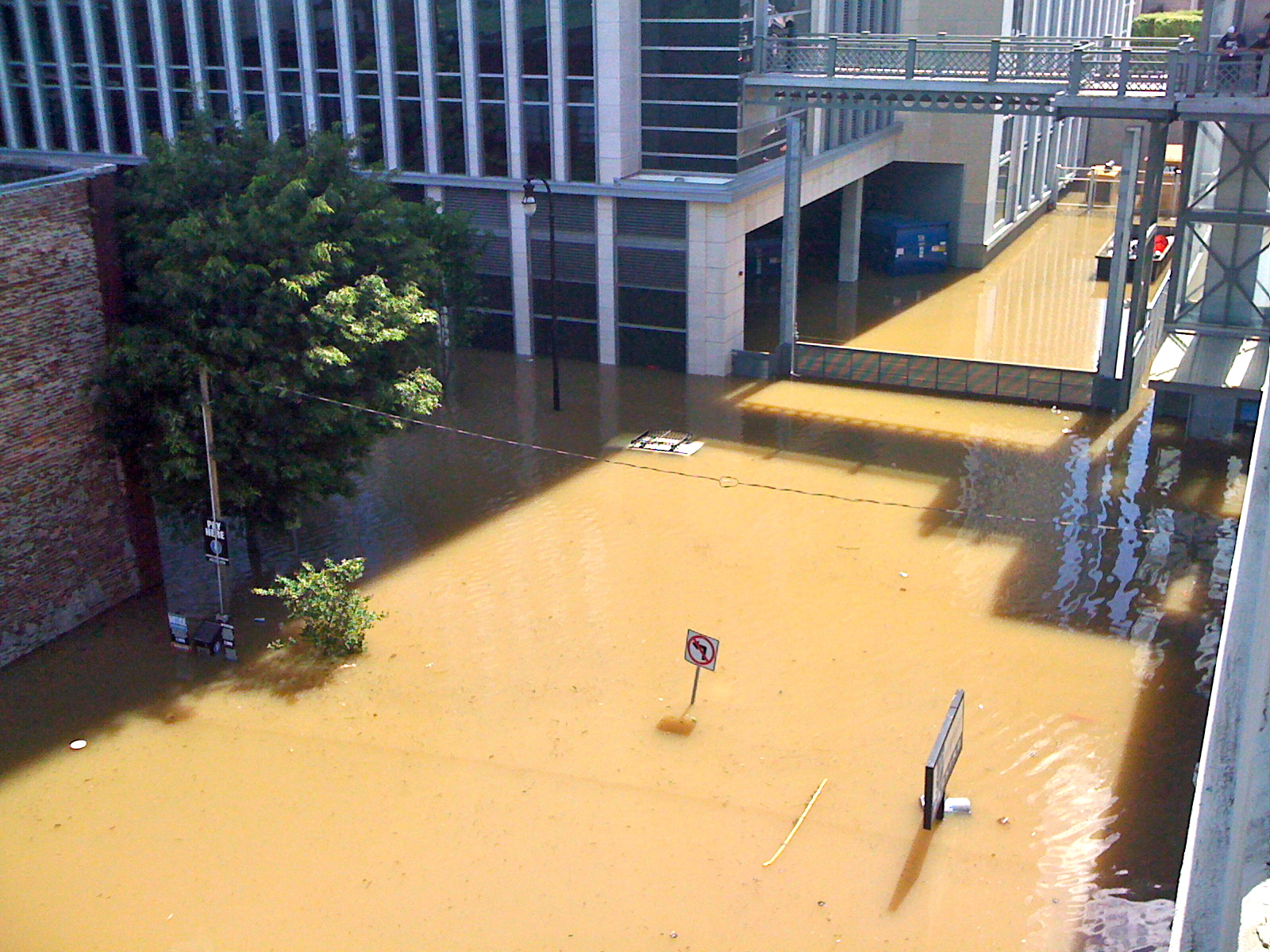
Flooding at Symphony Place in Nashville

The basement flooded in Schermerhorn Symphony Center, causing the destruction of two Steinway grand concert pianos and one organ valued at $2.5 million.

The common areas of the Gaylord Opryland Hotel were destroyed, and parts of the hotel were under 10 feet (3 m) of water at the peak of the floods. It remained closed until November 2010. The studios of WSM radio, located inside the Gaylord Opryland Hotel, escaped flooding, but became inaccessible during the restoration of the building. This event forced the station to broadcast from a makeshift studio at its transmitter site in Brentwood for six months. WSM's administrative offices next to the Grand Ole Opry House were also completely destroyed and later demolished, resulting in the loss of several priceless documents from the station's history. Neighboring Opry Mills mall was also inundated, and remained closed until March 29, 2012. Flood walls would later be constructed around Gaylord Opryland and the Grand Ole Opry House (but not Opry Mills) to protect those properties from similar future flooding events.

Flooding was reported in a mechanical room of the Country Music Hall of Fame and Museum, but the exhibits were not damaged.

The playing field, ground level facilities (such as locker rooms), and service entrance of LP Field were under water.

40 feet (12 m) of water filled the underground parking garage of The Pinnacle at Symphony Place, a 417-foot (127 m) tower in downtown that opened in February 2010, less than three months before the flood. Electric and elevator systems housed in the garage were damaged.

In Belle Meade, a neighborhood of Nashville, the ground floor of St. George's Episcopal Church was flooded.

In the early morning of May 4, flooding at a Nashville Electric Service substation caused power to go out in the center of the city. Among the buildings that lost electricity was the 617-foot (188 m) AT&T Building, the tallest building in Tennessee. Power was not expected to be restored until Friday, May 7.

The newsroom of WTVF was flooded and nonoperational for 3 months. Equipment was hastily moved during the flooding and set up at various locations around the building.

The Harrington water treatment plant, one of two in the city, flooded and the other was spared by mere feet; on Monday, May 3 residents were ordered to restrict water use, a situation that lasted for about a month.

The Dry Creek wastewater treatment plant in Madison was flooded with some equipment areas under more than 40 ft of water. Disinfection was quickly restored but recovery efforts required about a month to restore full operation to the major plant processes.

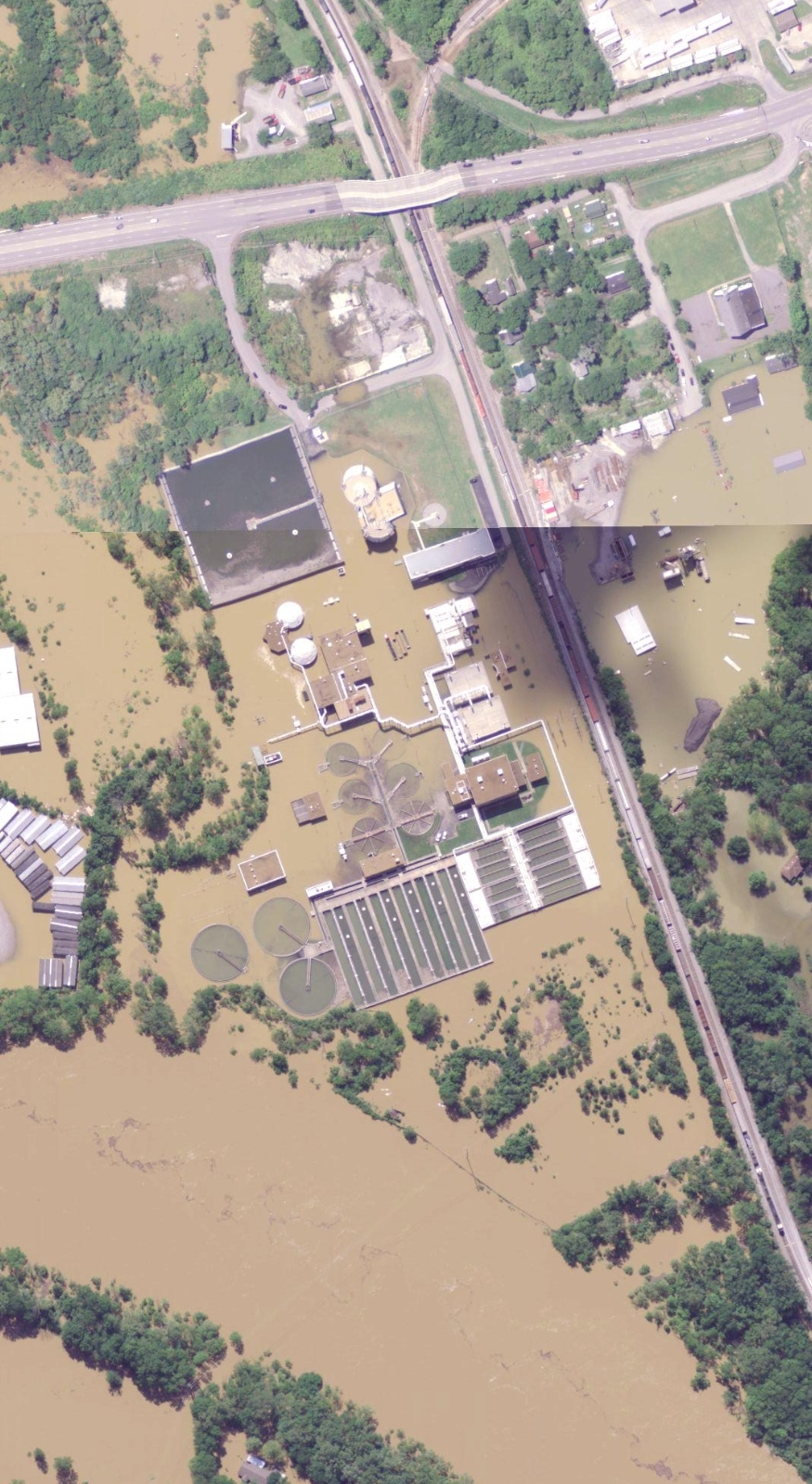
Aerial Photograph of the Dry Creek WWTP during the flood

Nashville/Davidson County was declared a Federal Disaster Area on May 4.

According to Nashville Mayor Karl Dean, damage estimates in Nashville totalled $1.5 billion not including damage to roads and bridges or public buildings, as well as contents inside buildings and residences.

=== Media coverage ===
Despite causing an estimated $2.3 billion in total damages across the region, the disaster received significantly less national media coverage compared to other contemporary crises. In a retrospective op-ed for The New York Times, author Margaret Renkl noted that the flooding became a "forgotten" disaster outside of the region, writing that "nobody cared when Nashville drowned" due to competing national headlines like the Deepwater Horizon oil spill and the local community's quiet, self-reliant response.

==== Hickman County ====
The Duck River at Centerville exceeded its record level by almost 10 feet flooding or destroying homes, roads, and agricultural land. One person in Hickman County died from drowning. Numbers of people who were stranded on I-40 sought refuge in Centerville.

==== Montgomery County ====
The Cumberland River in Clarksville flooded many businesses along the river. Flooded businesses were closed for up to seven weeks. All schools in the Clarksville-Montgomery County School System were closed for at least two weeks.

== Relief efforts ==
The Community Foundation of Middle Tennessee raised $14 million from individual donors and was allocated in various grants. The Metro Nashville Disaster Response Fund received roughly $3.5 million, the Tennessee Emergency Response Fund around $5.5 million, the River Fund $5 million, and other relief efforts received $234,000.

The River Fund was created with proceeds from Garth Brooks' December 2010 concerts for flood relief and served the 52 flood-affected counties in Tennessee.

On June 22, 2010, a benefit concert called "Nashville Rising" was held at Bridgestone Arena to raise money for Middle Tennessee flood relief efforts. The concert raised over $2.2 million for flood relief efforts.

American singer Taylor Swift donated $500,000 during a telethon hosted by WSMV.
