= Gaylord Opryland Resort & Convention Center =

Hotel and convention center in Tennessee

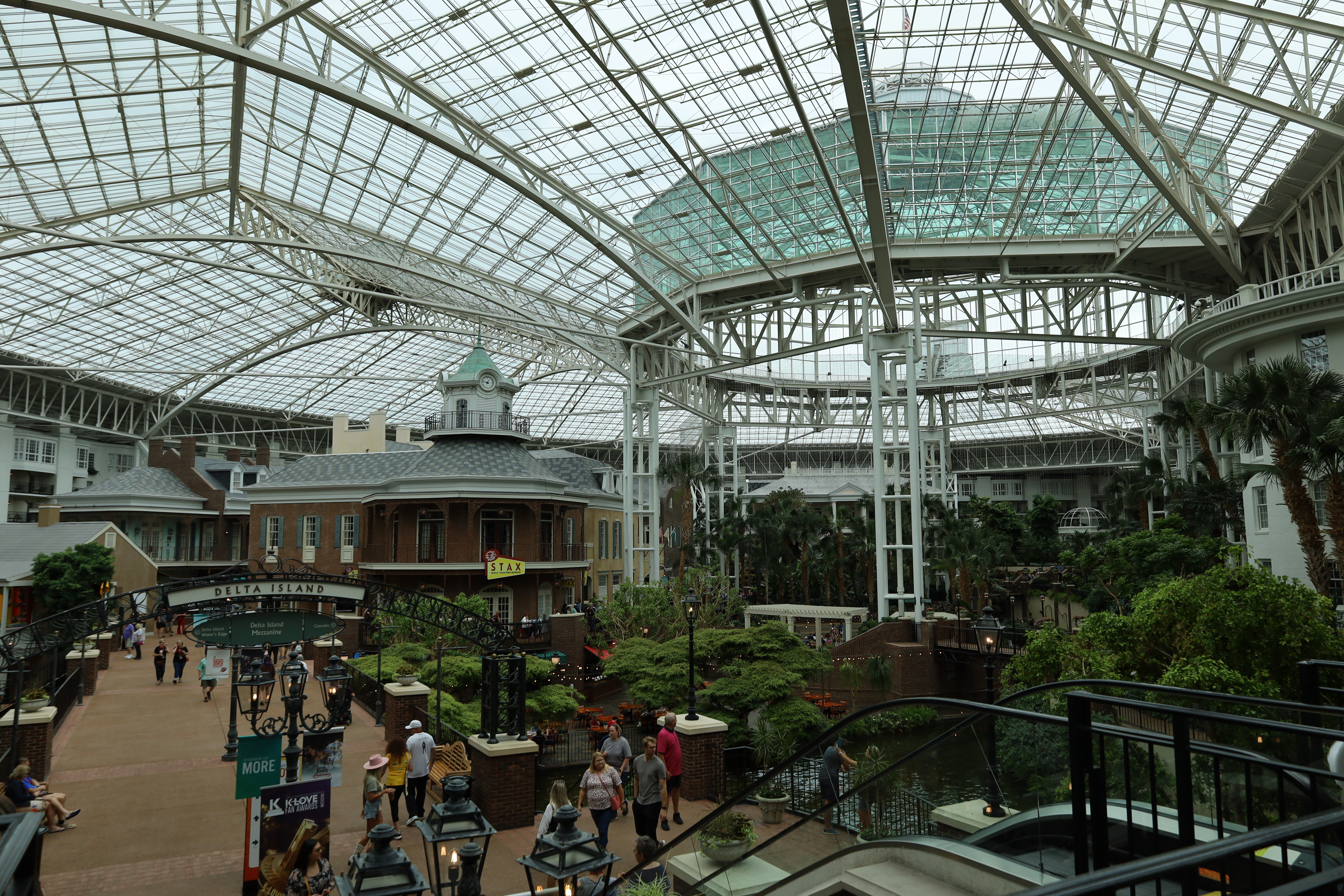
- The Delta Atrium in 2022
- Former names: Opryland Hotel (1977-1997); Opryland Hotel Nashville (1997-2001)

General information
- Location: Nashville, Tennessee
- Coordinates: 36°12′41″N 86°41′40″W
- Opening: November 24, 1977
- Owner: Ryman Hospitality Properties
- Operator: Marriott International

Technical details
- Floor count: 7

Design and construction
- Architect: Earl Swensson Associates

Other information
- Number of rooms: 2,888
- Number of suites: 172
- Number of restaurants: 21

Website
- Gaylord Opryland

Gaylord Opryland Resort & Convention Center, formerly known as Opryland Hotel, is a hotel and convention center located in Nashville, Tennessee. It is owned by Ryman Hospitality Properties (formerly known as Gaylord Entertainment Company), and operated by Marriott International.

== History ==
=== Opening and expansion ===
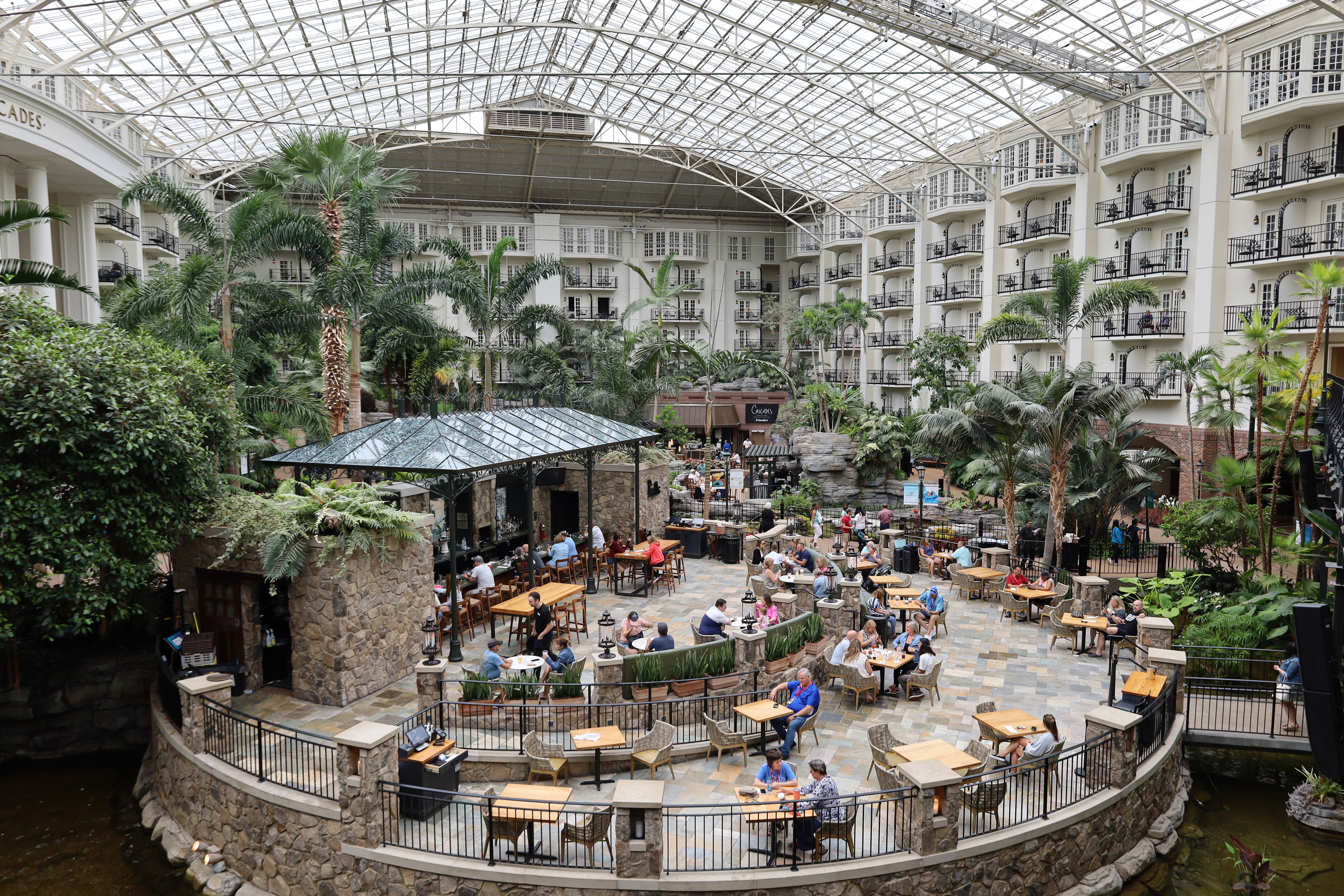
The Cascades Atrium in 2022

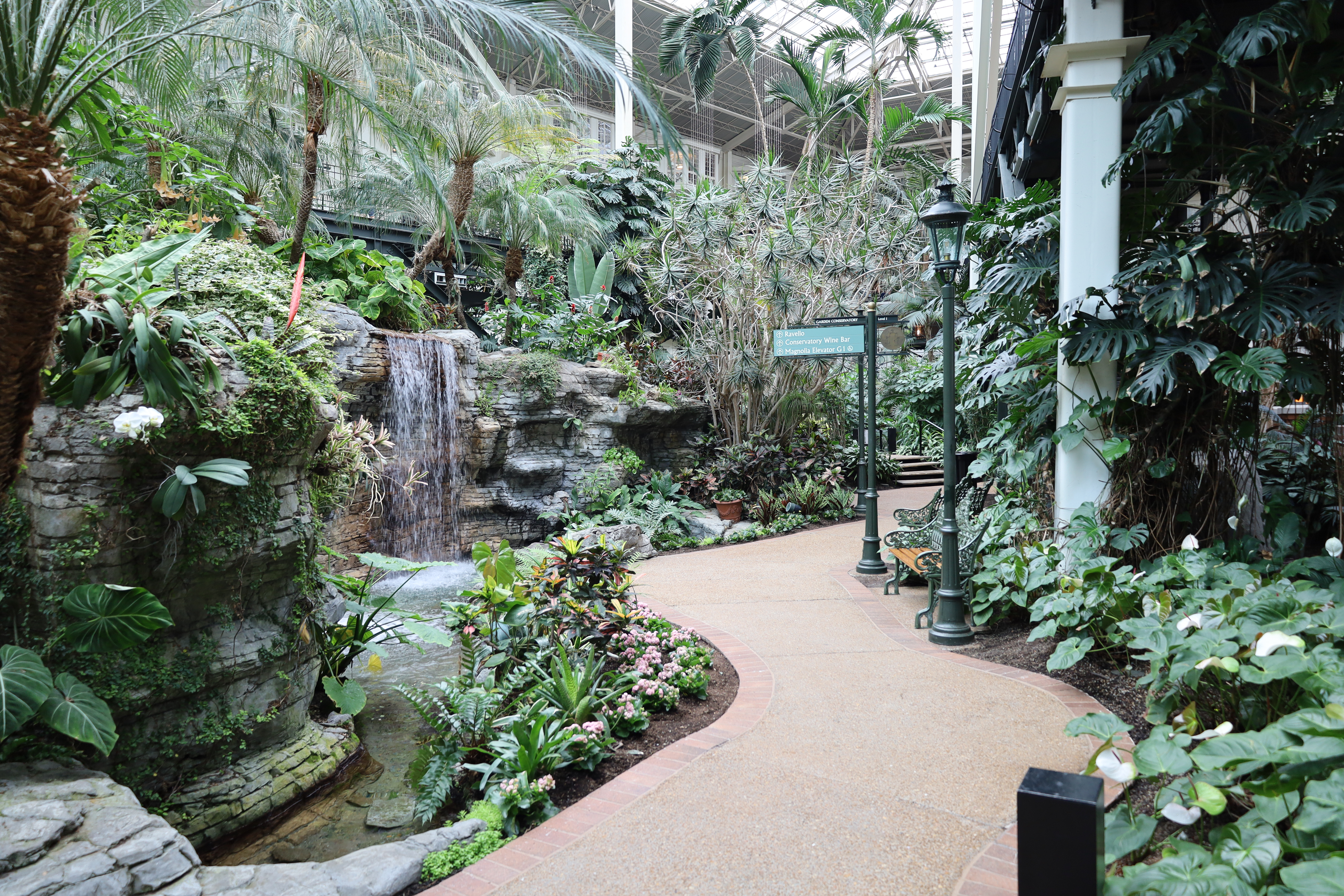
Garden Conservatory Atrium in 2022

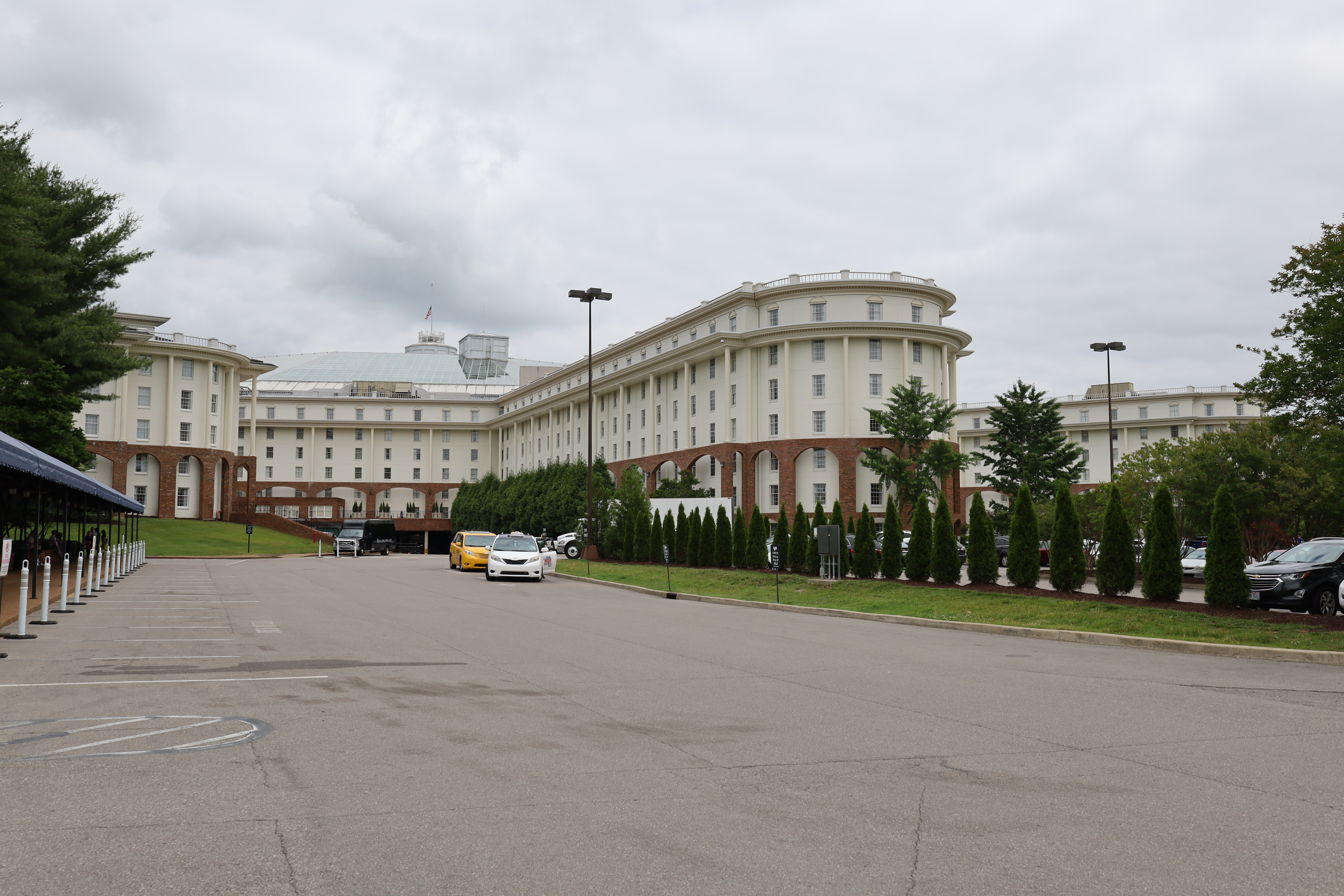
Exterior in 2022

Opryland Hotel opened on November 24, 1977, on land adjacent to the Opryland USA amusement park. The hotel was originally built to support the Grand Ole Opry, a Nashville country-music institution that had moved to the area three years before. The hotel at that time had 580 guest rooms and a ballroom. The Magnolia Lobby was designed to resemble a grand Southern mansion with an impressive staircase and a Tiffany-style chandelier.

Between 1983 and 1984 the hotel was expanded, adding over 400 guest rooms and incorporating facilities to meet the demands of the corporate meeting and convention market. A Garden Conservatory resembling a Victorian garden was added. This atrium maintained a constant temperature of 71 degrees and housed more than 10,000 plants.

In 1988, 2 acres (0.81 ha) and 797 guest rooms were added to the hotel. The Cascades Atrium was built, including a 3.5-story waterfall and more than 8,000 tropical plants. The Cascades Lobby expanded to 24 check-in stations that could check in 580 guests per hour when necessary.

A 4.5-acre (1.8 ha) expansion completed in 1996 doubled the size of the resort, adding approximately 1,000 guest rooms, 10 meeting rooms, a 289,000-square-foot (26,800 m^{2}) exhibit hall and a 57,000-square-foot (5,300 m^{2}) ballroom. The trademark feature of this addition was the Cajun-themed Delta Atrium, which incorporated a quarter-mile-long indoor river. Flatboats were introduced to carry guests along the river, and past a water feature that included jets which were choreographed to music. When the expansion was christened, water samples from more than 1,700 rivers throughout the world (including every registered river in the United States) were poured into the Delta River. The Old Hickory Steak House, built to resemble an antebellum-style mansion, was also added.

=== Later history ===
In 1997, Gaylord Entertainment announced it was building a second Opryland Hotel in Kissimmee, Florida. The announced name of the new property was Opryland Hotel Florida. Soon after, a third resort (Opryland Hotel Texas) was announced for Grapevine, Texas, and the original property was officially renamed Opryland Hotel Nashville to differentiate it from its new sister properties.

On December 31, 1997, the neighboring Opryland Themepark was shuttered and later demolished. In its place, Opry Mills shopping mall was constructed and opened on May 12, 2000.

On October 26, 2001, Gaylord Entertainment announced that its Opryland Hotels division (dba Opryland Lodging Group) would be renamed Gaylord Hotels, in advance of the Florida and Texas projects' completions. Opryland Hotel Nashville was renamed Gaylord Opryland Resort & Convention Center (or Gaylord Opryland, for short). Gaylord CEO Colin Reed said, "Research showed the Gaylord name connotes an upscale and high quality image that accurately reflects the brand." The Florida property was renamed Gaylord Palms and the Texas property was briefly renamed Gaylord Opryland Texas, before taking the Gaylord Texan name prior to its opening.

In a 2003 press release, Gaylord announced plans for a 5,000-seat amphitheatre on the site, which were later abandoned.

On May 2, 2010, the 2010 Tennessee flood devastated Nashville and caused considerable damage to Gaylord Opryland. Guests were evacuated as the flood waters rose as high as 10 feet (3 m) in some parts of the hotel. The hotel underwent renovations and reopened November 15, 2010. Repairs and renovations to the famed hotel included the addition of five restaurants and restoration of the atriums and guest rooms.

On January 19, 2012, Gaylord Entertainment announced a new partnership with Dolly Parton's The Dollywood Company to build a new water and seasonal snow park on acreage the company owns across Briley Parkway from Gaylord Opryland. The $50 million Phase 1 of the overall project was expected to open in Spring of 2014.

On May 31, 2012, Gaylord Entertainment announced it was selling its Gaylord Hotels brand and the rights to manage its four resorts and associated properties to Marriott International for $210 million. As part of the transaction, Gaylord Entertainment Company would be renamed Ryman Hospitality Properties, Inc. and see its corporate structure transitioned into a real estate investment trust. Ryman Hospitality would retain ownership of the properties themselves. The transaction took effect on January 1, 2013.

On September 28, 2012, citing Gaylord's deal with Marriott, Dolly Parton announced the withdrawal of her partnership in the new Nashville theme park announced earlier in the year, effectively killing the project.

On January 25, 2017, Ryman Hospitality Properties announced construction of a $90 million indoor/outdoor water park on the property. Called "Soundwaves", the water park opened December 1, 2018 and is available exclusively to overnight resort guests for an additional fee. Day packages for area residents were temporarily offered in 2020 as a result of the reduced resort traffic related to the COVID-19 pandemic.

== Wi-Fi jamming controversy ==
On October 3, 2014, the U.S. Federal Communications Commission imposed a $600,000 fine on Marriott for willful interference with private wi-Fi hotspot connections linking its clients' portable computers to client-owned mobile telephones in the hotel's convention space.

The scheme abused a "containment" feature of a wi-Fi monitoring system which was designed for the nominally lawful purpose of removing unwanted "rogue access points" from corporations' own local area networks. Marriott misused the system to send spurious de-authentication packets to client-owned wireless access points, which is unlawful as these are not part of Marriott's network but are owned by individual mobile subscribers. The fraudulent packets, which dissociate consumers' devices from their own Wi-Fi hotspot access points, were sent deliberately as a means to force convention-goers to buy wireless Internet access from the hotel at rates from $250–$1,000 per access point.

According to FCC Enforcement Bureau Chief Travis LeBlanc, "It is unacceptable for any hotel to intentionally disable personal hotspots while also charging consumers and small businesses high fees to use the hotel's own Wi-Fi network. This practice puts consumers in the untenable position of either paying twice for the same service or forgoing Internet access altogether." Despite the substantial fine, Marriott continues to deny that its conduct is illegal, saying it was using FCC approved equipment to protect its customers from hackers.

== Related Ryman Hospitality-owned properties in Nashville ==
- Grand Ole Opry
- General Jackson Showboat
- Ryman Auditorium
- Wildhorse Saloon, a downtown nightclub and event venue that closed in 2023.
- Ole Red, a downtown nightclub and event venue managed by RHP
- WSM Radio, whose studios were located in Gaylord Opryland's Magnolia Lobby from 1984 until 2024
- Opryland USA, defunct amusement park that operated from 1972 to 1997
