= Tennessee State Route 247 =

State highway in Tennessee, United States

State Route 247
- SR 247 highlighted in red

Route information
- Maintained by TDOT
- Length: 26.4 mi (42.5 km)
- Existed: July 1, 1983–present

Major junctions
- West end: SR 50 in Williamsport
- SR 7 in Santa Fe; SR 246 near Burwood; US 31 in Spring Hill
- East end: US 431 in Duplex

Location
- Country: United States
- State: Tennessee
- Counties: Maury, Williamson

Highway system
- Tennessee State Routes; Interstate; US; State
← SR 246	→ SR 248

State Route 247 (SR 247) is a 26.4-mile-long (42.5 km) east–west state highway in Maury and Williamson counties of Middle Tennessee.

== Route description ==
SR 247 begins in Maury County at an intersection with SR 50 in Williamsport. It heads east through rural farmland and slightly hilly terrain, running parallel to the Duck River, to Santa Fe, where it has a short concurrency with SR 7. The highway leaves the river and passes northeast through mountains for several miles to pass through Theta before reentering farmland and having over a 1.5 miles (2.4 km) long concurrency with SR 246 just south of Burwood. SR 247 the enters Spring Hill and passes along the northern edge of Spring Hill Manufacturing before passing through downtown, where it has an extremely short concurrency with US 31/SR 6. It then crosses into Williamson County and passes through subdivisions before leaving Spring Hill and crossing over I-65 without an interchange. The highway then passes through more wooded areas before entering Duplex and coming to an end at an intersection with US 431/SR 106.

== Major intersections ==
County	Location	mi	km	Destinations	Notes
Maury		0.00	0.00	SR 50 (Williamsport Pike)	Western terminus
Maury				SR 7 south	Western end of SR 7 concurrency
Maury				SR 7 north	Eastern end of SR 7 concurrency
Maury				SR 246 north – Franklin	Western end of SR 246 concurrency
Maury	Jameson			SR 246 south	Eastern end of SR 246 concurrency
Maury	Spring Hill			SR 396 east (Saturn Parkway)	Western terminus of SR 396
Maury	Spring Hill			US 31 south (Main Street/SR 6 south)	West end of concurrency with US 31/SR 6
Maury	Spring Hill			Main Street north ( US 31 / SR 6 north)	East end of concurrency with US 31/SR 6
Williamson	Spring Hill			Bridge over I-65; no access to freeway	
Williamson	Duplex	26.4	42.5	US 431 (SR 106) – Lewisburg, Franklin	Eastern terminus
1.000 mi = 1.609 km; 1.000 km = 0.621 mi: Concurrency terminus; Unopened
