= Tennessee State Route 397 =

Highway in Tennessee

State Route 397
- Mack Hatcher Memorial Parkway

Route information
- Maintained by TDOT
- Length: 9.7 mi (15.6 km)
- Existed: 1983–present
- Component highways: SR 397 / US 31 Truck / US 431 Truck

Major junctions
- South end: US 31 in Franklin
- US 431 in Franklin; SR 96 in Franklin; US 31 in Franklin; US 431 in Franklin
- North end: SR 96 in Franklin

Location
- Country: United States
- State: Tennessee
- Counties: Williamson

Highway system
- Tennessee State Routes; Interstate; US; State
← SR 396	→ SR 399

State Route 397 (SR 397), also known as Mack Hatcher Memorial Parkway, is a primary state route that serves as a perimeter road for the city of Franklin, Tennessee. Throughout its length, SR 397 also carries the designations of U.S. Route 31 Truck (US 31 Truck) and U.S. Route 431 Truck (US 431 Truck). The route connects multiple U.S. and state routes, and serves as a bypass around the business district of Franklin, as well as a major thoroughfare.

A route to bypass Franklin was first proposed in 1963, although major work did not begin until the late 1970s. The eastern part of SR 397 was constructed in three phases between 1983 and 1989. Since Franklin has grown rapidly since the road's initial construction, it is planned to be extended to form a full circumferential loop. The first phase of the extension was completed in 2021, with the final phase planned to complete the loop. The entire route is also planned to be eventually widened to four lanes.

== Route description ==
SR 397, most commonly referred to as Mack Hatcher Memorial Parkway or Mack Hatcher Parkway, is located entirely within the city of Franklin in Middle Tennessee, which is the second-largest suburb of Nashville and the seventh largest city in Tennessee. The parkway is a part of the National Highway System, a national network of roads identified as important to the national economy, defense, and mobility. The route serves as both a bypass around downtown Franklin and as a major thoroughfare for traffic traveling between residential and commercial areas within the city. In 2024, annual average daily traffic counts ranged from 30,337 vehicles on the north side near US 31 (Franklin Road) to 13,062 vehicles near the southern terminus.

SR 397 begins at an intersection with US 31 (Columbia Pike) south of downtown Franklin in an eastward alignment, where it also carries the US 31 Truck designation. Briefly a four-lane divided highway, it reduces to two lanes and crosses a CSX railroad mainline. It then shifts northeast, passing through residential subdivisions, before shifting east again, where it comes to an intersection with US 431 (Lewisburg Pike). Here, the US 431 Truck designation begins. The highway then crosses the Harpeth River before turning north and passing through a wooded area before widening to four lanes and reaching an intersection with SR 96 (Murfreesboro Road). Continuing northward, SR 397 passes by more subdivisions before curving to the northwest where it intersects the western terminus of Cool Springs Boulevard on the edge of the Cool Springs commercial center. Passing a golf course and wooded area, the parkway crosses Spencer Creek and the CSX railroad for a second time, before once again intersecting with US 31 (Franklin Road), where US 31 Truck ends. Next, the road proceeds westwardly, passing Battle Ground Academy before crossing the Harpeth River for a second time. It then reaches an intersection with US 431 (Hillsboro Road) for a second time, where the Truck designation for that highway ends. Entering the outskirts of Franklin, the route continues westward, reducing to two lanes and crossing the Harpeth River for a third and fourth time in short succession on a single long bridge. The highway passes through a semi-rural, but rapidly developing area still marked mostly by farmland, and curves south about one mile (1.6 km) beyond. A short distance later, SR 397 widens back to four lanes and comes to an end at an intersection with SR 96 (New Highway 96) west of downtown.

== History ==
A bypass to divert through traffic around downtown Franklin was first proposed in 1963. The central business district had begun to suffer from congestion due to the multiple highway spokes which intersect there and the lack of outer connections between them. A study of the project was conducted in 1979, along with public hearings. An environmental impact statement for the project was approved by the Federal Highway Administration (FHWA) on July 31, 1981, which was referred to at the time as the Franklin Bypass. Work on the first section, located between US 31 (Columbia Pike) and SR 96 (Murfreesboro Road) began in July 1983, and opened to traffic on December 20th, 1985. The bypass was named the Mack Hatcher Memorial Parkway by an act of the Williamson County Commission on November 21, 1983, in honor of a former county commissioner and road superintendent. Construction on the next section, between SR 96 and US 31 (Franklin Road) began in March 1987, and was opened to traffic on November 17, 1988. The contract for construction of the third section, between US 31 (Franklin Road) and US 431 (Hillsboro Road) was let in December 1987, and work was completed in November 1989. This was the only stretch that was initially all four lanes, although adequate right-of-way was purchased to allow for widening of the entire route to four lanes.

Since the parkway's initial construction, Franklin has become one of the fastest growing cities in the country, growing from slightly over 20,000 residents in 1990 to nearly 85,000 in 2020. This rapid growth has placed considerable stress on all of the infrastructure in the area, necessitating improvements to SR 397 and other roads. Work on widening the stretch between US 31 and SR 96 began in September 2011, and was completed in May 2014. The remaining two-lane portions are also planned to be widened in the future.

A series of transportation plans produced by the city of Franklin between 1989 and 1998 recommended that SR 397 be extended to become a full circumferential loop around the business district, and on July 1, 1999, the Board of Mayor and Aldermen requested that the Tennessee Department of Transportation (TDOT) study the feasibility of constructing this extension. On March 15, 2001, TDOT provided the city of Franklin with a feasibility report, which recommended six possible alignments. Some of these alignments faced intense public opposition. A draft environmental impact statement was approved for public availability by the FHWA on November 11, 2004. A supplemental draft was prepared to include a seventh alignment, Alternative G, which was approved by the FHWA on August 16, 2005. On December 2, 2005, TDOT announced that the preferred alignment for the Mack Hatcher Parkway Western Extension would be Alternate G, which is the shortest of the considered routes at 7.51 miles (12.09 km) long. Due to funding concerns, the western extension was split into two phases. Initially planned to be constructed with four lanes, most of the extension was also downgraded to two lanes, with enough right of way purchased to allow for widening to four lanes when this becomes necessary.

John Schroer, who served as Franklin mayor from 2007 to 2010, advocated strongly for the extension during his tenure, but upon becoming commissioner of TDOT in 2011, deprioritized the project upon determining that it was not as much of a need as many other projects throughout the state. This decision was subject to much criticism from local residents, and throughout the 2010s, many political candidates in Williamson County utilized the project as a campaign tactic. The extension did not receive funding until the passage of the IMPROVE Act by the Tennessee General Assembly in 2017, which raised the state's fuel taxes and vehicle registration fees to fund a backlog of highway projects throughout the state. Work began on the first segment of the extension, a length of 3.2 miles (5.1 km) between SR 96 and US 431, on December 18, 2018, and was opened to traffic on November 29, 2021. A dedication ceremony for the section occurred on December 13, 2021, which included the naming of the Harpeth River bridge in memory of former state representative Charles Sargent.

== Major intersections ==
The entire route is in Franklin, Williamson County.

mi	km	Destinations	Notes
0.0	0.0	US 31 (Columbia Highway/SR 6) – Franklin, Spring Hill US 31 Truck begins	Southern terminus of SR 397 and US 31 Truck
1.8	2.9	US 431 (Lewisburg Pike/SR 106) – Franklin, Lewisburg US 431 Truck begins	Southern terminus of US 431 Truck
2.0	3.2	Staff Sergeant Carey Thomas Moore Memorial Bridge over the Harpeth River	
3.2	5.1	SR 96 (Murfreesboro Road) – Franklin, Murfreesboro	
4.9	7.9	Cool Springs Boulevard	
5.7	9.2	US 31 (Franklin Road/SR 6) – Franklin, Brentwood US 31 Truck ends	Northern terminus of US 31 Truck
6.8	10.9	Matthew James Bergman Memorial Bridge over the Harpeth River	
7.4	11.9	US 431 (Hillsboro Road/SR 106) – Franklin, Forest Hills US 431 Truck ends	Northern terminus of US 431 Truck
7.5– 8.0	12.1– 12.9	Charles W. Sargent Jr. Memorial Bridge over the Harpeth River	
9.7	15.6	SR 96 (New Highway 96) – Franklin, Fairview	Current northern/western terminus
		SR 246 (Carters Creek Pike) – Franklin, Burwood	Part of the proposed Western Extension
1.000 mi = 1.609 km; 1.000 km = 0.621 mi: Concurrency terminus; Unopened

== See also ==
- Special routes of U.S. Route 31
- Special routes of U.S. Route 431
