= U.S. Route 31 in Tennessee =

Segment of American highway

U.S. Route 31
- US 31 in Tennessee highlighted in red

Route information
- Maintained by TDOT
- Length: 93.01 mi (149.69 km)
- Existed: November 11, 1926–present

Major junctions
- South end: I-65 / US 31 at the Alabama state line in Ardmore
- I-65 near Elkton; US 31A in Pulaski; US 412 / US 43 in Columbia; US 431 in Franklin; US 41 / US 41A / US 70S / US 431 in Nashville; I-24 in Nashville
- North end: US 31E / US 31W / US 41 / US 431 in Nashville

Location
- Country: United States
- State: Tennessee
- Counties: Giles, Maury, Williamson, Davidson

Highway system
- United States Numbered Highway System; List; Special; Divided; Tennessee State Routes; Interstate; US; State
| ← SR 30 | → US 31E |

U.S. Route 31 (US 31) is a part of the United States Numbered Highway System that runs from Spanish Fort, Alabama, to Mackinaw City, Michigan. In the U.S. state of Tennessee, it runs concurrently with Interstate 65 (I-65) for the first mile northward from the Tennessee state line. There US 31 parallels I-65 to downtown Nashville. At Pulaski US 31 meets the southern terminus of US 31A in Tennessee. US 31 continues due north through Lynnville, Columbia, Spring Hill, Franklin and Brentwood to Nashville. The route splits into US 31E and US 31W in Nashville and goes into Kentucky.

== Route description ==
The first mile of US 31 in Tennessee runs concurrently with I-65. At Exit 1 in Ardmore, it leaves I-65 and begins an unsigned concurrency with State Route 7. US 31 then goes through Elkton before going through mainly rural countryside until it has an intersection with US 64 on the outskirts of Pulaski. US 31 gains the name 1st Street through Pulaski; upon leaving Pulaski US 31 meets the southern terminus of US 31A (Grigsby Street). US 31 goes through more rural countryside on its way to Columbia. In Columbia, US 31 picks up the names Carmack Boulevard and Garden Street; it also has a short concurrency with US 412 Business (US 412 Bus.) and intersects the northern terminus of US 43. After leaving Columbia, US 31 gains two designations, first it gains a Tennessee Parkway designation from Columbia to Rosa L. Parks Boulevard in Nashville, and then it picks up the hidden SR 6, which it keeps later as US 31E to the Tennessee state line. US 31 goes through some more rural countryside before meeting the western terminus of SR 396 (Saturn Parkway) in Spring Hill and gains the name 1st Street. After leaving Spring Hill, US 31 has an interchange with I-840. US 31 then continues into Franklin, where US 31 Truck makes a turn to the east onto SR 397 (Mack Hatcher Memorial Parkway), while US 31, erroneously signed here as US 31 Business (which doesn't actually exist and US 31 mainline is signed throughout Franklin), passes north through downtown Franklin. US 31 then has an intersection with mainline US 431 (5th Avenue) before passing through Franklin Square and crossing the Harpeth River to meet SR 397 and the northern end of US 31 Truck. US 31 then goes through the Nashville suburb of Brentwood as Franklin Road. While in Brentwood, US 31 has three important interchanges with SR 441 (Moores Lane), SR 253 (Concord Road) and SR 254 (Old Hickory Boulevard). US 31 next goes through the cities of Oak Hill and Berry Hill, where it has an interchange with SR 155 (Thompson Lane/Woodmount Boulevard), before arriving in Nashville.

US 31 next gains the name 8th Avenue and a while later overlaps US 41 (Lafayette Street), US 70S and US 41A. After going over Broadway (US 70 and US 431), US 31 picks up US 431, loses US 70S and gains the name Rosa L. Parks Boulevard. US 31, US 431 and US 41 and US 41A then go around the Tennessee State Capitol Building and lose US 41A, the Rosa L. Parks name and the Tennessee Parkway designation. US 31, US 431 and US 41 then go over the Cumberland River on the Victory Memorial Bridge. US 31, US 431 and US 41 then have an interchange with I-24. Immediately after the I-24 interchange, US 31E splits off (as Ellington Parkway) from US 31, US 41 US 431 and creating the beginning of the U.S. Route 31E–US 31W split.

US 31E is called Ellington Parkway until its overlap with SR 155 (Briley Parkway) between exits 15 and 14. US 31E then changes names to Johnny Cash Parkway. US 31E then goes through Hendersonville, picks up the name Nashville Pike and has an incomplete interchange with SR 386 (Vietnam Veterans Parkway). US 31E then goes through Gallatin, meets the northern terminus of SR 386 and US 31E Bypass. US 31E then goes through rural countryside, picks up US 231 at Westmoreland. US 31E and US 231 the go through more rural countryside until the Tennessee state border (where the northern terminus of SR 6 is). US 31E and US 231 stay concurrent into Kentucky.

As for US 31W, US 41 and US 431 they change names a total of two times, first from Spring Street to then Dickerson Pike. US 431 leaves the congruence at Trinty Lane, leaving US 31W, US 41 to carry on. US 31W, US 41 then have an incomplete interchange with SR 155 and I-65. US 31W, US 41 split just north of Goodlettsville. US 31W has an interchange with I-65. US 31W the goes through rural countryside until getting to White House. US 31W then goes through more rural countryside until reaching the Tennessee state border, where it crosses in Kentucky.

== History ==
US 31 through Tennessee was one of the original 1926 highways. that was approved on November 11, 1926.

== Major intersections ==
| County | Location | mi | km | Destinations | Notes |
|---|---|---|---|---|---|
| Giles | Ardmore | 0.0 | 0.0 | I-65 south / US 31 south – Huntsville | Continuation south into Alabama |
| Giles | Ardmore | 1.3 | 2.1 | I-65 north / SR 7 south (Main Street) – Nashville, Ardmore | Northern end of I-65 concurrency; southern end of unsigned SR 7 concurrency; exit 1 on I-65 |
| Giles | Elkton | 4.5 | 7.2 | SR 273 west (Prospect Road) – Prospect | Southern end of SR 273 concurrency |
| Giles | Elkton | 5.5 | 8.9 | SR 273 east (Bryson Road) to I-65 – Fayetteville | Northern end of SR 273 concurrency |
| Giles | Pulaski | 16.0 | 25.7 | US 64 (Lawrenceburg Highway/Fayetteville Highway) – Lawrenceburg, Fayetteville | |
| Giles | Pulaski | 18.3 | 29.5 | SR 11 south / SR 15 (College Street) – Minor Hill, Lawrenceburg, Fayetteville | Southern end of SR 11 concurrency |
| Giles | Pulaski | 19.0 | 30.6 | US 31A north (E Grigsby Street/SR 11 north) to I-65 – Cornersville, Lewisburg | Northern end of SR 11 concurrency; southern terminus of US 31A |
| Giles | Waco | 31.5 | 50.7 | SR 129 east (Waco Road) – Lynnville, Cornersville | Western terminus of SR 129 |
| Maury | Columbia | 47.1 | 75.8 | SR 50 (James Campbell Boulevard) – Lewisburg, Centerville | |
| Maury | Columbia | 49.0 | 78.9 | US 412 Bus. west (SR 99/W 7th Street) – Hohenwald | Southern end of US 412 Bus. concurrency |
| Maury | Columbia | 49.4 | 79.5 | SR 7 north (N James Campbell Boulevard) – Santa Fe, Bon Aqua | Northern end of unsigned SR 7 concurrency |
| Maury | Columbia | 50.8 | 81.8 | US 43 south / US 412 west (Bear Creek Pike/SR 6/SR 99) to I-65 – Hohenwald, Mount Pleasant, Chapel Hill | Eastern terminus of US 412 Business; Northern terminus of US 43; southern end of unsigned SR 6 concurrency; both SR 6 and SR 99 unsigned |
| Maury | Columbia | 53.4 | 85.9 | SR 246 north (Carters Creek Road) | Southern terminus of SR 246 |
| Maury | Spring Hill | 57.0– 57.3 | 91.7– 92.2 | GM Spring Hill Manufacturing main entrance | Interchange |
| Maury | Spring Hill | 58.7– 59.5 | 94.5– 95.8 | SR 396 east (Saturn Parkway) to I-65 | Interchange; western terminus of SR 396 |
| Maury | Spring Hill | 60.5 | 97.4 | SR 247 (Duplex Road) – Duplex, Santa Fe | |
| Williamson | Thompson's Station | 65.8– 66.0 | 105.9– 106.2 | I-840 – Murfreesboro, Dickson | Exit 28 on I-840; former SR 840 |
| Williamson | Thompson's Station | 66.7– 67.0 | 107.3– 107.8 | SR 248 north (Goose Creek Bypass) | Southern terminus of SR 248; interchange |
| Williamson | Franklin | 70.9 | 114.1 | SR 397 north / US 31 Truck north (Mack Hatcher Memorial Highway) | Franklin bypass; southern terminus of SR 397 and US 31 Truck |
| Williamson | Franklin | 73.0 | 117.5 | SR 246 south (7th Avenue) | Northern terminus of SR 246 |
| Williamson | Franklin | 73.1 | 117.6 | US 431 / SR 96 west (Fifth Avenue/SR 106) | Southern end of brief concurrency with SR 96 |
| Williamson | Franklin | 73.3 | 118.0 | SR 96 east (3rd Avenue S) | Northern end of brief concurrency with SR 96; roundabout |
| Williamson | Franklin | 75.1 | 120.9 | SR 397 / US 31 Truck south / US 431 Truck (Mack Hatcher Memorial Highway) | Franklin Bypass; northern terminus of US 31 Truck |
| Williamson | Brentwood | 77.2 | 124.2 | SR 441 east (Moores Lane) | Western terminus of SR 441 |
| Williamson | Brentwood | 79.5 | 127.9 | SR 253 east (Concord Road) | Western terminus of SR 253 |
| Williamson | Brentwood | 82.2 | 132.3 | SR 252 south (Church Street) | Northern terminus of SR 252 |
| Davidson | Oak Hill | 82.5 | 132.8 | SR 254 (Old Hickory Boulevard) – Forest Hills, Antioch | |
| Davidson | Oak Hill | 86.1 | 138.6 | SR 255 north (Harding Place) – Donelson | Southern terminus of SR 255; provides access to Nashville International Airport |
| Davidson | Berry Hill | 87.6– 87.9 | 141.0– 141.5 | SR 155 (Thompson Lane/Woodmont Boulevard) | Interchange |
| Davidson | Nashville | 90.9 | 146.3 | US 31A south / US 41 south / US 41A south / US 70S east (Lafayette Street/SR 1/SR 11) | Roundabout; northern terminus of US 31A; southern end of US 41/US 41A/US 70S concurrency |
| Davidson | Nashville | 91.2 | 146.8 | US 70 / US 70S west / US 431 south (Broadway/SR 1/SR 24) | Southern end of US 431 concurrency; Northern end of US 70S concurrency |
| Davidson | Nashville | 91.8 | 147.7 | US 41A north (Rosa L. Parks Boulevard/SR 12) | Northern end of US 41A concurrency |
| Davidson | Nashville | 92.9 | 149.5 | I-24 east – Chattanooga | Exit 48 on I-24 |
| Davidson | Nashville | 93.01 | 149.69 | US 31E north (Ellington Parkway/SR 6) / US 31W north / US 41 north / US 431 north (Spring Street/SR 11) | Interchange; US 31 splits into US 31E and US 31W; Concurrency with US 41, US 431, SR 6, and SR 11 ends |
1.000 mi = 1.609 km; 1.000 km = 0.621 mi: Concurrency terminus; Incomplete access; Route transition

U.S. Route 31
| Previous state: Alabama | Tennessee | Next state: Kentucky |
