= Tennessee State Route 246 =

State highway in Tennessee, United States

State Route 246
- SR 246 highlighted in red

Route information
- Maintained by TDOT
- Length: 21.7 mi (34.9 km)
- Existed: July 1, 1983–present

Major junctions
- South end: US 31 in Columbia
- SR 247 near Burwood; I-840 in Burwood
- North end: US 31 in Franklin

Location
- Country: United States
- State: Tennessee
- Counties: Maury, Williamson

Highway system
- Tennessee State Routes; Interstate; US; State
← SR 245	→ SR 247

State Route 246 (SR 246) is a 21.7-mile-long (34.9 km) north–south state highway in Middle Tennessee. It connects the cities of Columbia and Franklin via the community of Burwood. SR 246 serves as an alternate route to U.S. Route 31 (US 31) to the east.

== Route description ==
SR 246 begins as Carters Creek Pike in Maury County at the northern edge of Columbia at an intersection with US 31 (SR 6). It winds its northwest through industrial areas before leaving Columbia and continuing north through farmland. The highway then has a concurrency with SR 247 shortly before crossing into Williamson County. SR 246 turns northeast and passes through the community of Burwood, where it has an interchange with Interstate 840 (I-840; Exit 23), before passing through hilly and rural areas. It then enters Franklin, where it passes through neighborhoods, as Main Street, for several miles before entering downtown and making an abrupt right turn onto 7th Avenue before coming to an end at an intersection with US 31 (SR 6/Columbia Avenue). The entire route of SR 246 is a two-lane highway.

== Major intersections ==
County	Location	mi	km	Destinations	Notes
Maury	Columbia	0.0	0.0	US 31 (Nashville Highway/SR 6) – Columbia, Spring Hill	Southern terminus
Maury				SR 247 east (Beechcroft Road) – Spring Hill	Southern end of SR 247 concurrency
Maury				SR 247 west (Les Robinson Road) – Santa Fe	Northern end of SR 247 concurrency
Williamson	Burwood			I-840 – Dickson, Murfreesboro	Exit 23 on I-840; former SR 840
Williamson	Franklin	21.7	34.9	US 31 (Columbia Avenue/SR 6)	Northern terminus
1.000 mi = 1.609 km; 1.000 km = 0.621 mi: Concurrency terminus
