= Cadillac XT5 =

Compact/mid-size luxury crossover SUV

- Cadillac XT5 (first generation)

Overview
- Manufacturer: General Motors
- Production: January 2016 – present
- Model years: 2016–present

Body and chassis
- Class: Compact luxury crossover SUV (D)
- Body style: 5-door SUV
- Layout: Front-engine, front-wheel drive / all-wheel drive

Chronology
- Predecessor: Cadillac SRX

The Cadillac XT5 (short for Crossover Touring 5) is a compact luxury crossover SUV manufactured by General Motors. It was introduced at both the Dubai Motor Show and LA Auto Show in November 2015.

The XT5 replaced the Cadillac SRX crossover when it was launched in early 2016. It is the second model to use Cadillac's new alphanumeric naming scheme (after the CT6) and the first in the Crossover Touring (XT) series. The XT5 is manufactured at GM's Spring Hill Manufacturing plant. The Chinese-market XT5 is manufactured in Shanghai by SAIC-GM.

== First generation (2016) ==
First generation
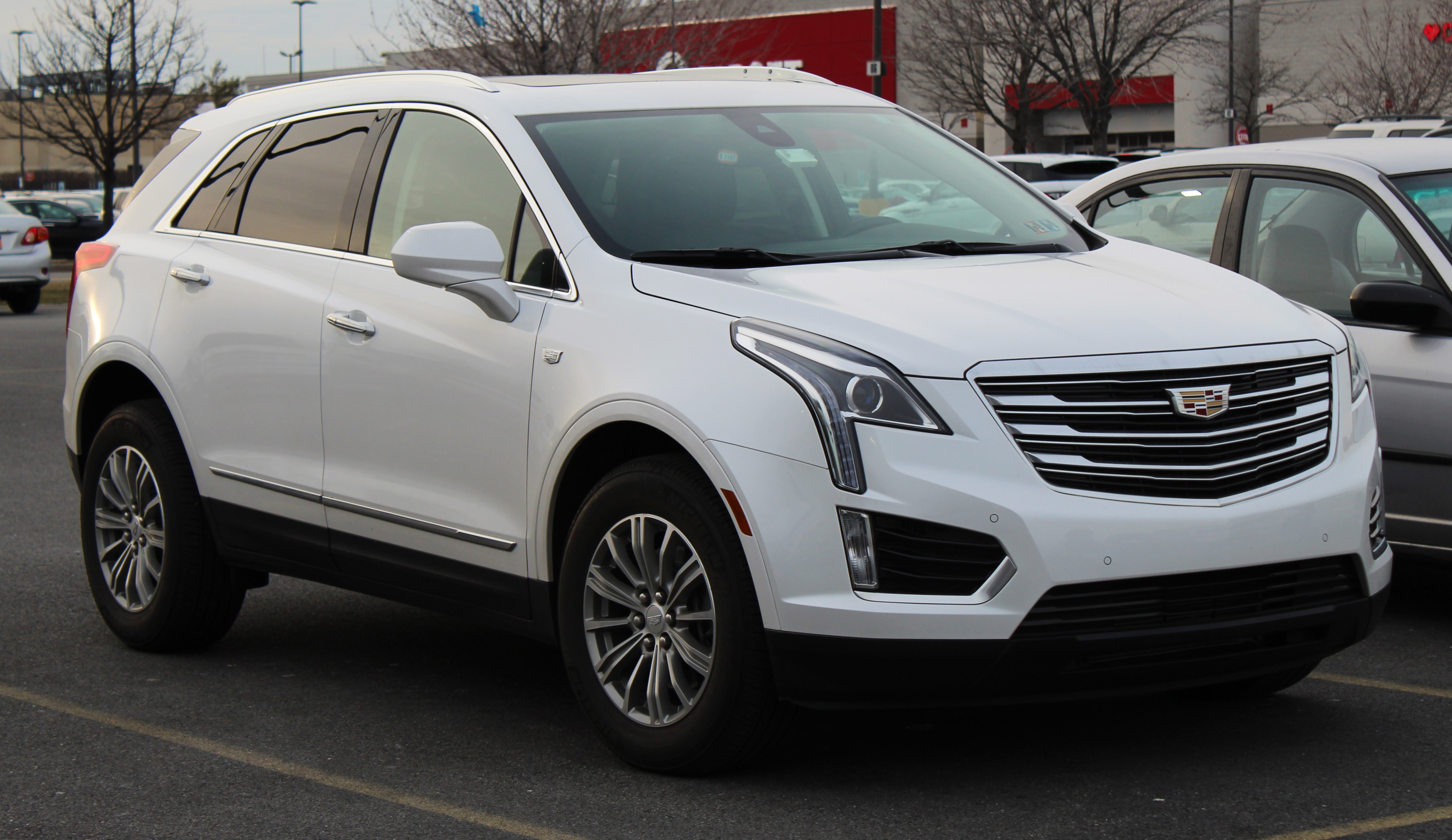

Overview
- Production: January 2016–present; 2016–2024 (South Korea & China)
- Model years: 2017–present
- Assembly: United States: Spring Hill, Tennessee (Spring Hill Manufacturing); China: Shanghai (SAIC-GM)
- Designer: Bob Boniface

Body and chassis
- Platform: C1XX platform

Powertrain
- Engine: Gasoline: 2.0 L LTG turbo I4 (China); 2.0 L LSY I4; 3.6 L LGX V6 (US)
- Transmission: AF50-8 (8-speed) (2017–2019); GM 9-speed Hydramatic 9T65 (2020–)

Dimensions
- Wheelbase: 2,857 mm (112.5 in)
- Length: 4,815 mm (189.6 in)
- Width: 1,903 mm (74.9 in)
- Height: 1,675 mm (65.9 in)
- Curb weight: FWD: 1,808–1,866 kg (3,985–4,113 lb); AWD: 1,931–1,976 kg (4,257–4,356 lb)

Chronology
- Predecessor: Cadillac SRX

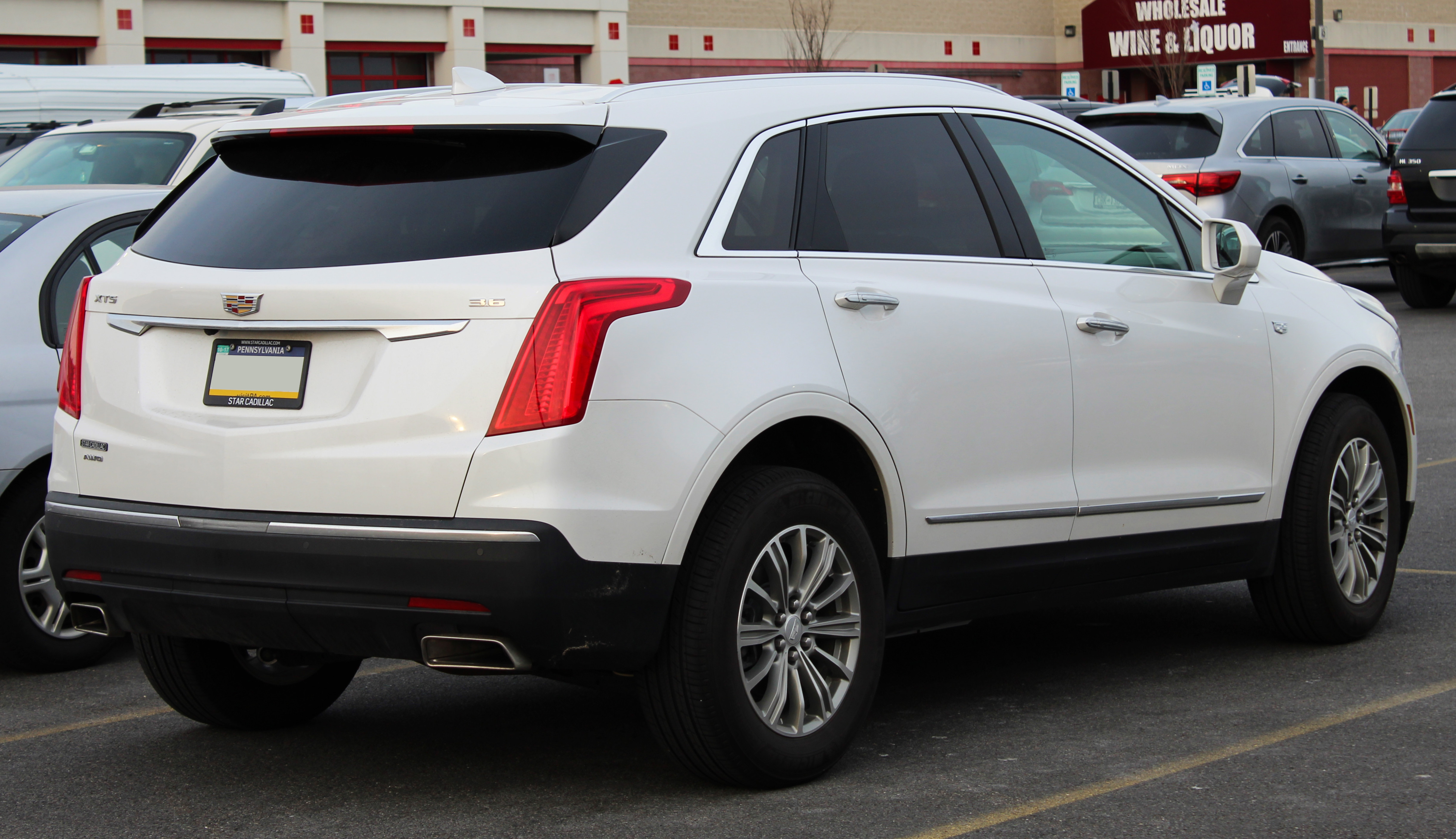
Cadillac XT5 (rear view)

The XT5 features technology such as a streaming video rear-view mirror, 360° view backup camera, and the first application in a Cadillac of GM’s Electronic Precision Shift, which replaces the standard hydraulic shifter with an electronic controller. This, together with a new lightweight chassis, results in a weight savings of 278 lb (126 kg) versus the outgoing SRX.

=== Powertrain ===
The XT5 was initially available with only one engine, depending on the market. In the United States, it was a 3.6-liter V6 used in other recent Cadillac models, producing 310 hp (231 kW) and 271 lb⋅ft (367 N⋅m) of torque. The V6 includes automatic stop-start and cylinder deactivation to improve fuel economy. In China, the XT5 is powered by a turbocharged 2.0-liter 4-cylinder engine producing an estimated 258 hp (192 kW) and 295 lb⋅ft (400 N⋅m) of torque. The XT5 is available in both front-wheel drive and all-wheel drive. The AWD system, provided by GKN Driveline, is completely new for this model and utilizes features like twin-clutch differential at rear axle with active torque vectoring, allowing the system to distribute 100% of torque to either front or rear axle as well as to either left or right rear wheel. In an addition to that, the AWD system allows the driver to disconnect the rear drive unit and leave the car in FWD mode for improved fuel efficiency.

=== Trim levels ===
The 2017 XT5 is offered in four trim levels. Above the base XT5 are "Luxury", "Premium Luxury" and range topping "Platinum". The base price of the entry front-wheel drive 2017 XT5 at launch was $38,995 in the United States.

=== 2020 update ===
For the 2020 model year, the XT5 received several mid-cycle updates. The trim levels changed to Cadillac's "Y" strategy, with Luxury as the base, and Premium Luxury and Sport as separate higher levels. The exterior design received only minor changes, with a new bright metallic patterned grille on the Premium Luxury, and a new darker grille on the Sport.

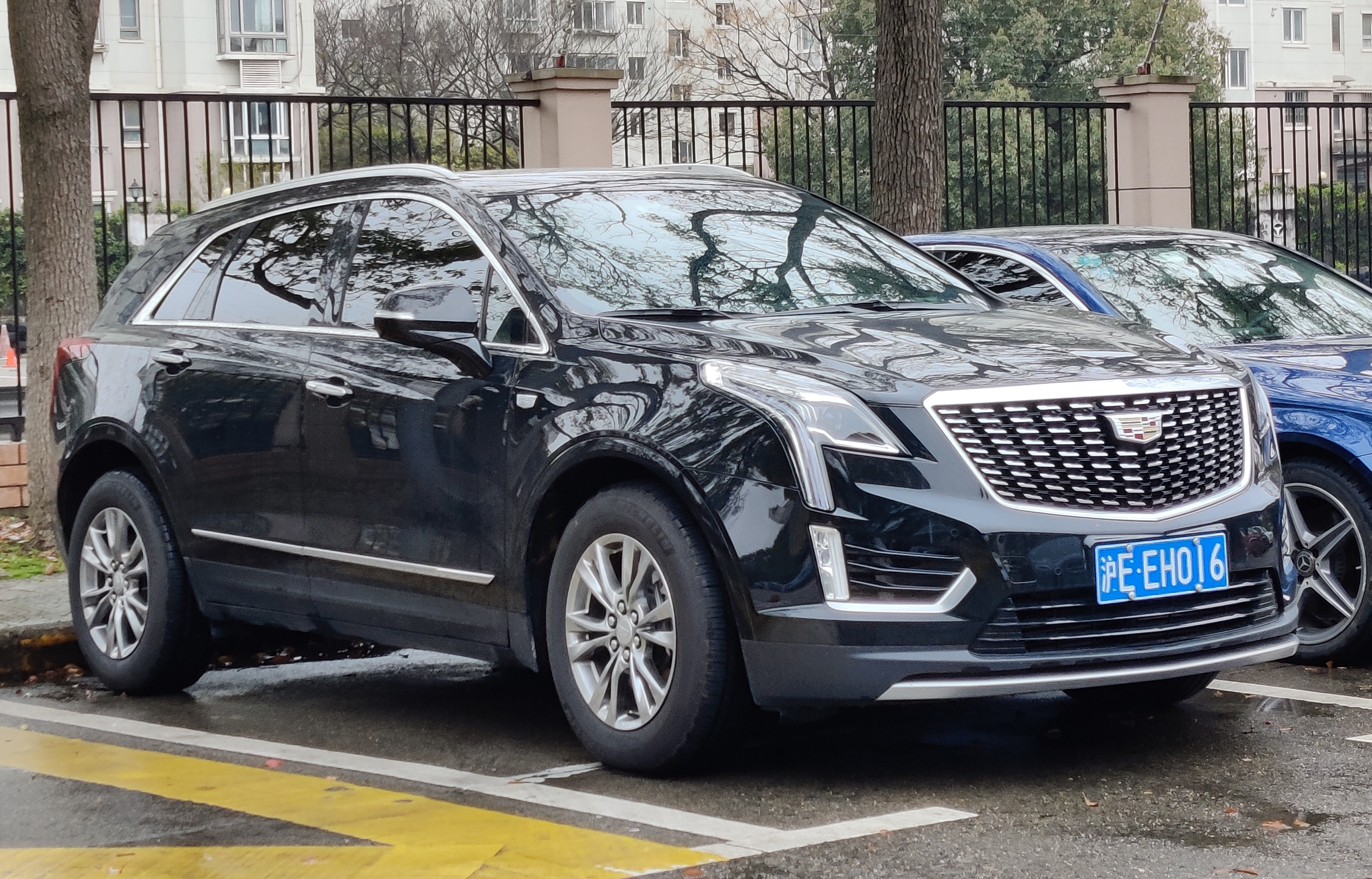
Cadillac XT5 (China)

GM's newest 2.0 L turbocharged I4 engine, producing 237 hp (177 kW) and 258 lb⋅ft (350 N⋅m) torque, replaced the previous engine in China, and became the new base engine in the North American market, joining the V6. A new rotary controller for the Cadillac CUE system was added, along with updates to the rear camera mirror and electronic precision shifter.

=== Safety ===
The 2017 model year XT5 was awarded "Top Safety Pick", by IIHS, for models equipped with optional collision prevention safety systems.

IIHS scores (2017)
Small overlap front (driver)	Good		
Moderate overlap front (original test)	Good		
Side (original test)	Good		
Roof strength	Good		
Head restraints and seats	Good		
Headlights	Marginal	Poor	
Front crash prevention: vehicle-to-vehicle	Superior	Advanced	Optional
Child seat anchors (LATCH) ease of use	Acceptable		

== Second generation (2024) ==
Second generation
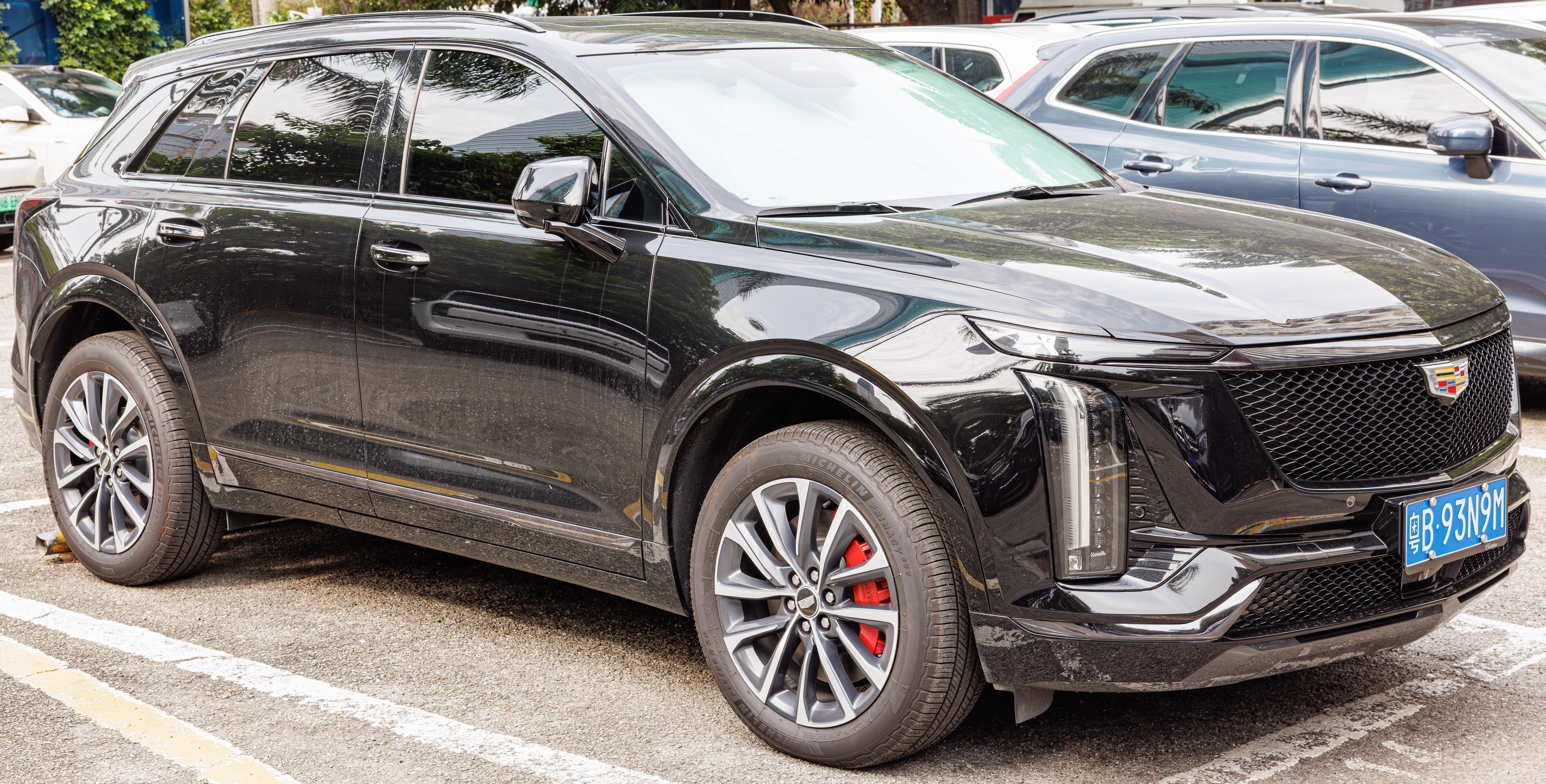

Overview
- Production: 2024–present
- Assembly: China: Shanghai (SAIC-GM)

Body and chassis
- Platform: GM VSS-S (C1-2)

Powertrain
- Engine: Gasoline: 2.0 L LXH turbo I4 mild hybrid; Petrol plug-in hybrid: 1.5 L LD3 turbo I4
- Transmission: GM 9T65 Hydramatic 9-speed automatic; 2-speed DHT (PHEV)
- Battery: 35.5 kWh Ultium NMC Zenergy
- Electric range: 155 km (96 mi) (WLTP); 215 km (134 mi) (CLTC)

Dimensions
- Wheelbase: 112.7 in (2,863 mm)
- Length: 192.4 in (4,888 mm)
- Width: 77.0 in (1,957 mm)
- Height: 66.7 in (1,694 mm); 66.5 in (1,688 mm) (PHEV)
- Curb weight: 3,985–4,113 lb (1,808–1,866 kg) (FWD); 4,257–4,356 lb (1,931–1,976 kg) (AWD); 4,784–4,850 lb (2,170–2,200 kg) (AWD)

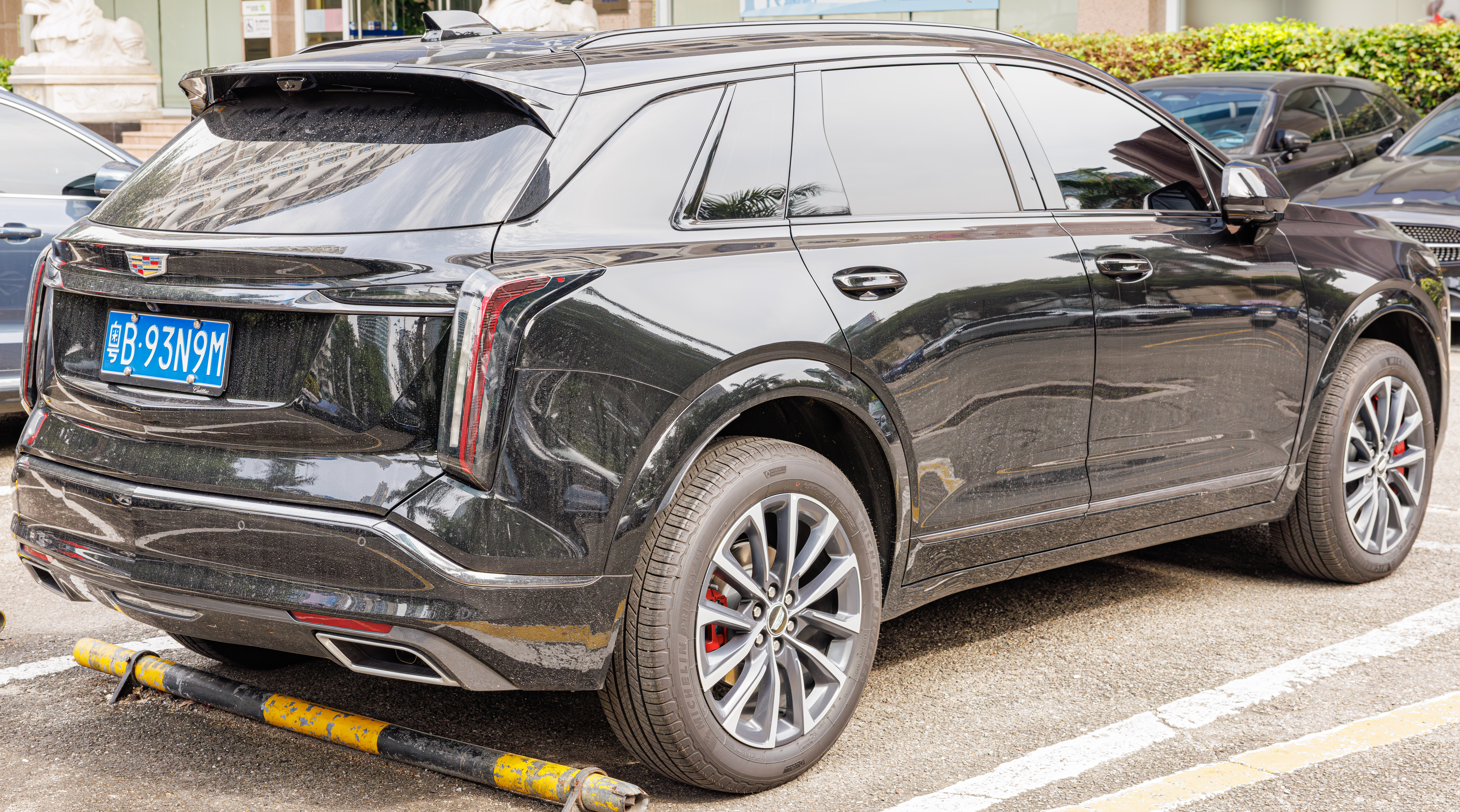
Cadillac XT5 II (rear view)

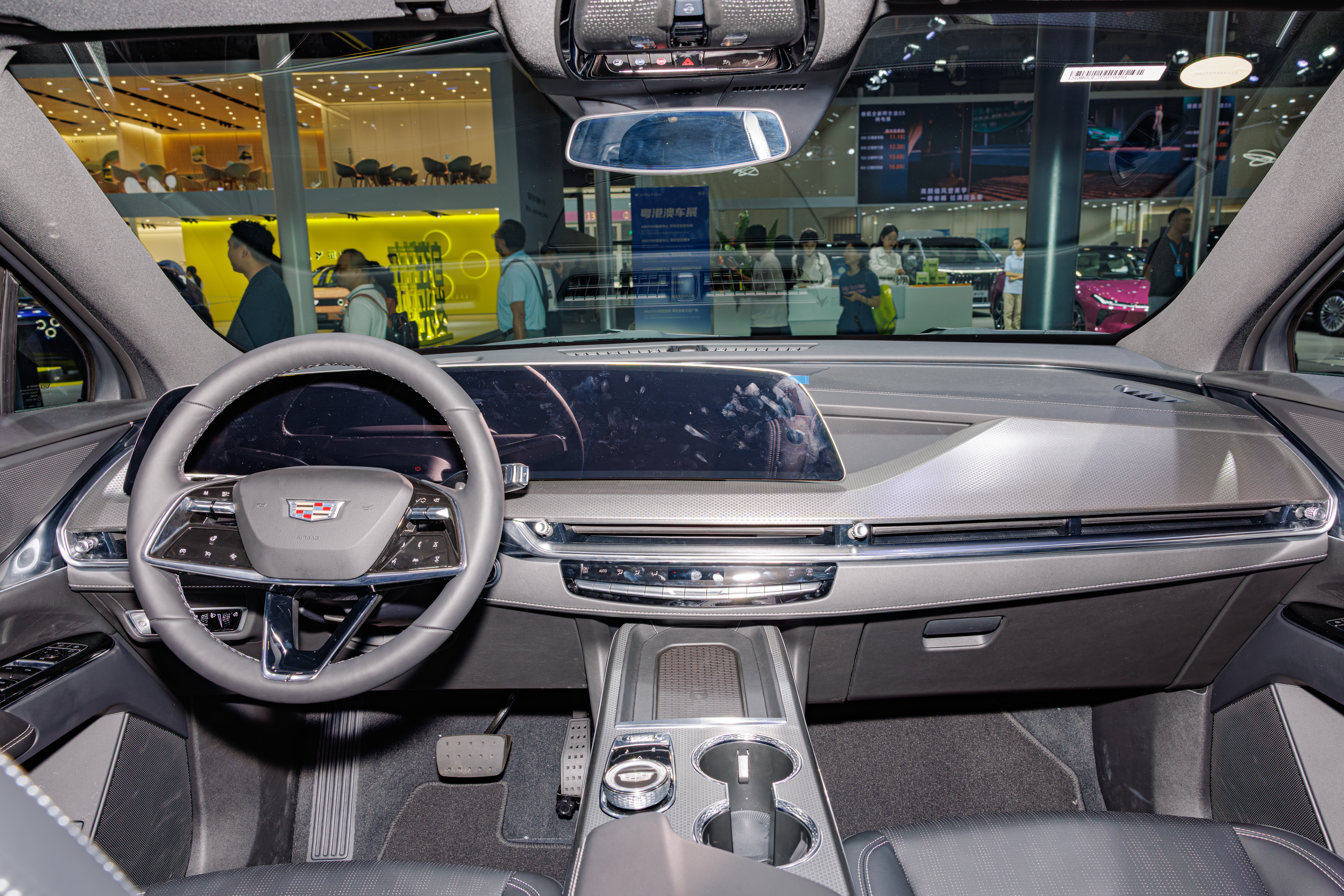
Cadillac XT5 II Interior

The second generation Cadillac XT5 was unveiled in China in August 2024. It features updated exterior styling and increased dimensions. It features updated styling in line with other Cadillac models, adaptive high-beam headlights, and a choice of 20 or 21-inch wheels. Optional six-piston Brembo brakes with red-painted calipers are available. The XT5’s suspension has continuous damping control.

The interior features a 33-inch curved instrument cluster-infotainment combination display stretching from behind the steering wheel to the center of the dashboard. The interior is finished in semi-aniline leather for seating along with wood and aluminum trim. The center console has a floating design and has an air-cooled 15W wireless charging pad, and a crystal infotainment control knob. The XT5 features 126-color ambient lighting, a panoramic sunroof, a 9.3-inch digital rearview mirror display, and a 15-speaker AKG audio system.

The XT5 is powered by a 2.0-liter turbocharged four-cylinder 48V mild hybrid system outputting 227 horsepower (169 kW; 230 PS). It drives the wheels through a nine-speed automatic transmission and an optional twin-clutch all-wheel drive system that is capable of sending 100% of rear axle power to a single wheel.

=== Plug-in hybrid ===
In May 2026, MIIT filings revealed a plug-in hybrid variant of the XT5. It made its public debut at the 2026 Chengdu Auto Show in August and launched on 7 September 2026.

The exterior is largely similar to the petrol model, with differences including a redesigned lower grille which now accommodates active grille shutters, the addition of a rooftop lidar module leading to the removal of the shark fin antenna, 21-inch wheels with low rolling resistance tires, and concealed exhaust tips. Additionally, the headlights and taillights now house teal ADAS assisted driving indicator lights.

The interior layout remains similar, but the technology has been upgraded. The infotainment system runs on a Qualcomm Snapdragon 8775P SoC and utilizes ByteDance's Doubao AI model to enable natural language voice commands from 4 seating zones. The interior is available in two additional colors and features a modified center console which now has dual 50-watt active-cooled wireless charging pads, 66-watt wired charging, and a refrigerator-heater compartment. Additionally, the rear seat space has been improved with the removal of the center hump and the rear of the center console being moved forward by 84 mm (3.3 in).

The XT5 PHEV is powered by Cadillac's in-house developed Super plug-in hybrid system, which uses a P1+P3 and P4 motor layout and a 2-speed dedicated transmission. It is powered by a 1.5-liter turbocharged petrol engine outputting 148 hp (110 kW; 150 PS) and a dual-motor all-wheel drive system consisting of a 160 kW (215 hp; 218 PS) permanent magnet synchronous motor on the front axle and 110 kW (148 hp; 150 PS) induction motor at the rear, for a total of 516 hp (385 kW; 523 PS) and 740 N⋅m (546 lb⋅ft) of torque. It has a 35.5 kWh NMC Ultium Zenergy-supplied battery weighing 194 kg (428 lb), capable of 215 km (134 mi) of CLTC electric range. The battery can be recharged from 30–80% in 15 minutes and the vehicle is capable of V2L. Cadillac claims a 0–100 km/h (62 mph) acceleration time of 4.8 seconds with the battery fully charged and 5.4 seconds with the battery fully depleted and a top speed of 210 km/h (130 mph).

It is equipped with the Momenta R7 world model for its ADAS system.

Cadillac says that 3,000 XT5 PHEVs were delivered in the first three weeks after it launched.

== Sales ==
Calendar year	United States	China
2016	39,485	34,775
2017	68,312	63,588
2018	60,565	74,761
2019	49,879	62,575
2020	35,223	62,091
2021	28,380	52,977
2022	27,340	43,093
2023	26,808	34,743
2024	26,432	36,248
2025	24,702	41,556
