= Tennessee State Route 248 =

State highway in Tennessee, United States

State Route 248
- Goose Creek Bypass
- SR 248 highlighted in red

Route information
- Maintained by TDOT
- Length: 3.7 mi (6.0 km)
- Existed: July 1, 1983–present

Major junctions
- West end: US 31 near Thompson's Station
- US 431 south of Franklin
- East end: I-65 southeast of Franklin

Location
- Country: United States
- State: Tennessee
- Counties: Williamson

Highway system
- Tennessee State Routes; Interstate; US; State
← SR 247	→ SR 249

State Route 248 (SR 248) is an east–west secondary state highway located entirely in Williamson County in Middle Tennessee.

== History ==
In the early morning of August 15, 2014, while the road and bridge over Interstate 65 were under construction, a tanker crashed into one of the bridge's support pillars, killing the driver and engulfing the bridge in flames. The bridge was damaged beyond repair and was destroyed on September 20. Construction continued as planned, and the widened bridge was opened to traffic on June 15, 2016.

== Route description ==
SR 248 begins at an interchange-style junction with U.S. Route 31 (US 31, SR 6) near Thompson's Station, and goes northeast through rural areas to have an intersection with U.S. Route 431 (US 431, SR 106) before it comes to an end at Interstate 65 (I-65) southeast of Franklin.

After the I-65 junction near the Williamson County Fairgrounds, the road continues as Peytonsville Road, a locally maintained thoroughfare connecting the interchange with the town of Peytonsville and I-840.

== Major intersections ==
The entire route is in Williamson County.

Location	mi	km	Destinations	Notes
Thompson's Station	0.0	0.0	US 31 (Columbia Pike/SR 6) – Spring Hill, Franklin	Western terminus; interchange
			US 431 (Lewisburg Pike/SR 106) – Franklin, Lewisburg	
	3.7	6.0	I-65 – Huntsville, Nashville	I-65 exit 61; eastern terminus; road continues as Peytonsville Road (end of state maintenance)
1.000 mi = 1.609 km; 1.000 km = 0.621 mi
