= Thompson Store =

- Formerly listed on the U.S. National Register of Historic Places
- Location: Duplex Rd. and Lewisburg Pike, Duplex, Tennessee
- Area: 1 acre (0.40 ha)
- Built: c.1890
- MPS: Williamson County MRA
- NRHP reference No.: 88000359

Significant dates
- Added to NRHP: April 13, 1988
- Removed from NRHP: November 25, 2009

The Thompson Store is a property in Duplex, Tennessee that was listed on the National Register of Historic Places (NRHP) in 1988. and delisted in 2009. It dates from c. 1890.

It is a one-story, wood-frame building dating from c. 1890 or c. 1900 that was the general store and post office of the crossroads community of Duplex into the mid-1900s. In a 1988 study of historic resources in the county, the Thompson Store was evaluated to be one of the "two best remaining store buildings from the early 20th century" besides in the city of Franklin (along with the Huff Store at Burwood, Tennessee, also NRHP-listed).
