= Maplewood Farm (Spring Hill, Tennessee) =

- Samuel B. Lee House; Maplewood Farm (Boundary Increase)
- U.S. National Register of Historic Places
- Location within Tennessee Location within the United States
- Location: Duplex Rd. 1/2 mi. W of Lewisburg Pike, Duplex, Tennessee, near Spring Hill, Tennessee
- Coordinates: 35°44′35″N 86°50′44″W
- Area: 470 acres (190 ha)
- Built: c. 1830, c. 1835, c. 1900, 1819
- Architectural style: Central passage plan, Greek Revival
- MPS: Williamson County MRA
- NRHP reference No.: 88000300 (original); 92001758 (increase)

Significant dates
- Added to NRHP: April 13, 1988
- Boundary increase: January 12, 1993

The Samuel B. Lee House, also known as Maplewood, is a house in Duplex, in the U.S. state of Tennessee that was listed on the National Register of Historic Places in 1988. The listed area was increased from 72 to 398 acres (29 to 161 ha) and the property listing name was changed to Maplewood Farm 1993.

When originally listed the property included five contributing buildings and one non-contributing structure on 72 acres (29 ha). The eligibility of the property for NRHP listing was addressed in a 1988 study of Williamson County historical resources.

The boundary increase listing mentions five contributing buildings, one contributing site, and two contributing structures.
