= Huff's Store =

- Huff Store
- U.S. National Register of Historic Places
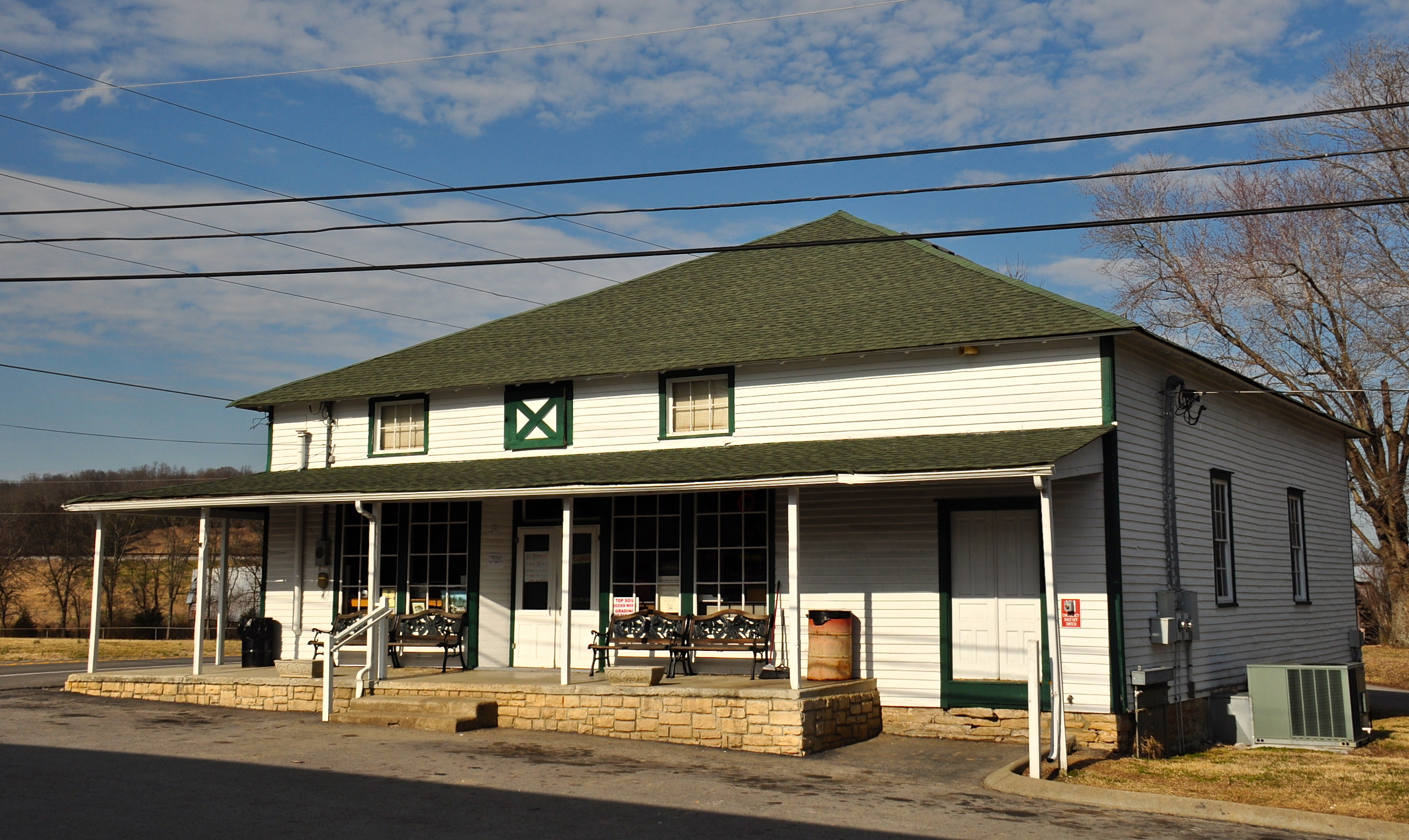
- Huff's Store, February 2014.

- Location within Tennessee Location within the United States
- Location: Carters Creek Pike, Burwood, Tennessee
- Coordinates: 35°48′44″N 86°58′59″W
- Area: less than 1 acre (0.40 ha)
- Built: 1911
- MPS: Williamson County MRA
- NRHP reference No.: 88000321
- Added to NRHP: April 13, 1988

Huff's Store is a general store in Burwood, Tennessee. It was listed on the National Register of Historic Places in 1988. It is a one-story building with a hipped roof that was built in 1911.

The store is one of the last general stores still operating in Middle Tennessee. It was owned and operated by Kenneth E. Huff, one of eight children in the Huff family, which acquired the store in 1937, until his death on May 23, 2014. His son, Charlie Huff now operates the store. A brother, Glenn Huff, operated a store in Brentwood called Huff's Grocery.

In a 1988 study of historic resources in Williamson County, Huff's Store was evaluated to be one of the "two best remaining store buildings from the early 20th century" outside of Franklin (along with the Thompson Store at Duplex). As of 1988, it was described as "remarkably unaltered."

Several television commercials have been made at Huff's Store.

According to the NRHP nomination, "The store built in 1911 by Millard and Vance Akin who ran a general store at this location until 1937. The Akin brothers used the building to sell general produce and utilized the small balcony area for the sale of shoes. In 1937 the store was purchased by R.G. Huff who operated the store into the 1960s when ownership and operation were taken over by his son, Ken Huff."
