= Tennessee State Route 441 =

State highway in Tennessee, United States

State Route 441
- Moores Lane
- TN 441 highlighted in red

Route information
- Maintained by TDOT
- Length: 3.7 mi (6.0 km)

Major junctions
- West end: US 31 in Franklin
- I-65 on the Franklin–Brentwood city line
- East end: SR 252 in Brentwood

Location
- Country: United States
- State: Tennessee
- Counties: Williamson

Highway system
- Tennessee State Routes; Interstate; US; State
← US 441	→ SR 443

State Route 441 (SR 441, also known as Moores Lane) is a 3.7-mile-long (6.0 km) east–west state highway in Williamson County, Tennessee in the central part of the U.S. state of Tennessee. It travels along the Franklin–Brentwood city line, just south of Nashville.

== Route description ==
SR 441 begins at an intersection with US 31/SR 6 (Franklin Road) in Franklin. The highway travels to the east-southeast, along the Franklin–Brentwood city line. Then, it has an approximately 0.5-mile-long (0.80 km) segment in Brentwood proper. After that, SR 441 travels along the city line again. During this stretch, it has an interchange with I-65. Inside this interchange, it enters Brentwood proper for the rest of its length. The highway passes along the northern edge of the Nashville Golf & Athletic Club and Crockett Springs Lake. Then, it curves to the northeast and meets its eastern terminus, an intersection with SR 252 (Wilson Pike).

== Major intersections ==
The entire route is in Williamson County.

Location	mi	km	Destinations	Notes
Franklin	0.0	0.0	US 31 (SR 6/Franklin Road) – Downtown, Brentwood	Western terminus
Franklin–Brentwood line	1.4	2.3	I-65 – Huntsville, Nashville	I-65, exit 69
Brentwood	3.7	6.0	SR 252 (Wilson Pike) – Arrington, Downtown	Eastern terminus
1.000 mi = 1.609 km; 1.000 km = 0.621 mi

== See also ==
- List of state routes in Tennessee
