= Tennessee State Route 252 =

State highway in Tennessee, United States

State Route 252
- Wilson Pike
- SR 252 highlighted in red

Route information
- Maintained by TDOT
- Length: 13.4 mi (21.6 km)
- Existed: July 1, 1983–present

Major junctions
- South end: SR 96 in Arrington
- North end: US 31 in Brentwood

Location
- Country: United States
- State: Tennessee
- Counties: Williamson

Highway system
- Tennessee State Routes; Interstate; US; State
← SR 251	→ SR 253

State Route 252 (SR 252) is a south–north road in Williamson County, Tennessee that connects Arrington with Brentwood.

== Route description ==
SR 252 begins as Wilson Pike in Arrington at an intersection with SR 96. It goes north through farmland to enter the Brentwood city limits before having intersections with SR 441 and SR 253. It begins paralleling I-65 before entering downtown and coming to an intersection with Church Street. SR 252 then turns west along Church Street to pass under I-65 to come to an end at US 31/SR 6 less than a half-mile away.

== Major intersections ==
The entire route is in Williamson County.

Location	mi	km	Destinations	Notes
Arrington	0.0	0.0	SR 96 (Murfreesboro Road) – Franklin, Murfreesboro	Southern terminus
Brentwood			SR 441 west (Moores Lane) to I-65 – Franklin	Eastern terminus of SR 441
Brentwood			SR 253 (Concord Road) to I-65 – Nolensville	
Brentwood	13.4	21.6	US 31 (Franklin Road/SR 6) – Franklin, Oak Hill	Northern terminus
1.000 mi = 1.609 km; 1.000 km = 0.621 mi

== See also ==
- List of state routes in Tennessee
