= Rippavilla Plantation =

Historic house in Tennessee, United States

- Rippavilla
- U.S. National Register of Historic Places
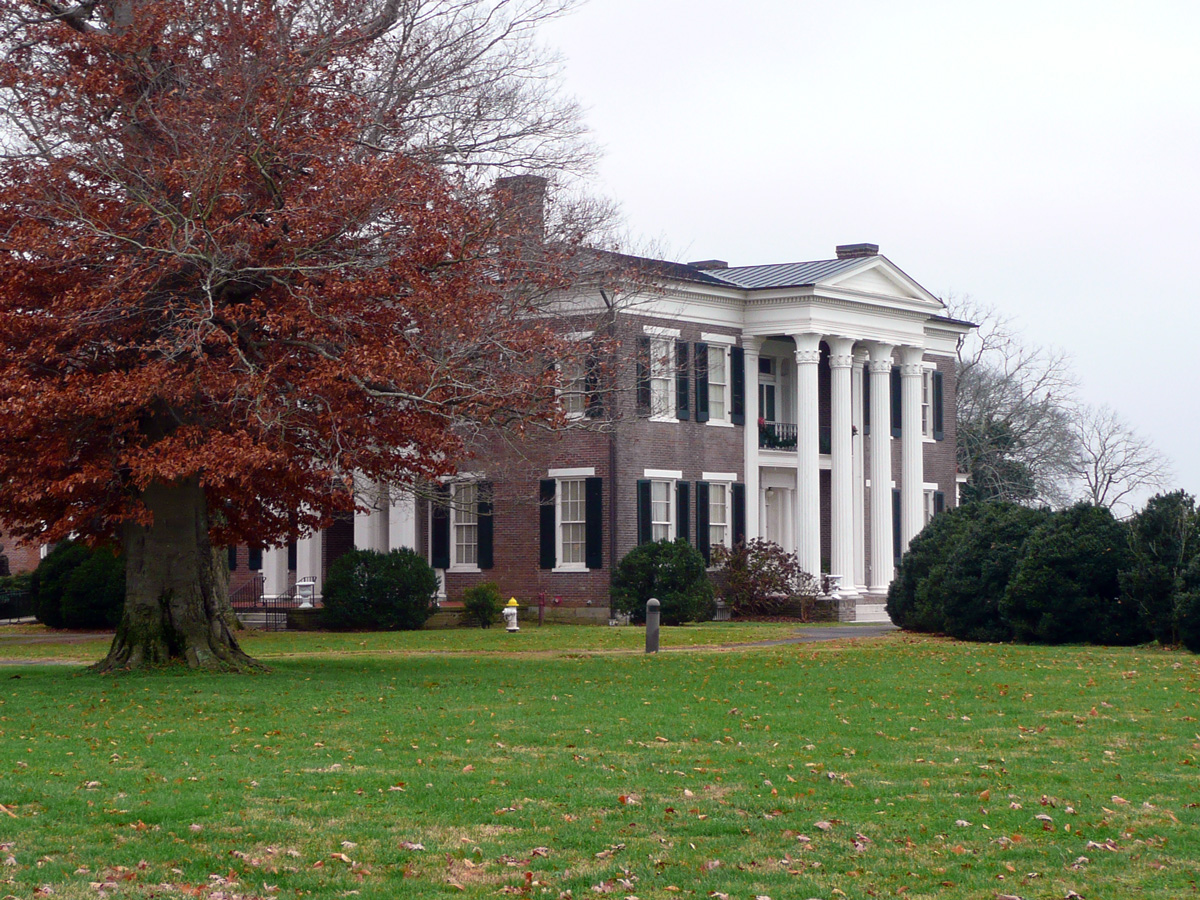

- Location within Tennessee Location within the United States
- Location: Spring Hill, Tennessee
- Coordinates: 35°43′54″N 86°57′14″W
- Built: 1852
- Architect: F. Stratton
- Architectural style: Greek Revival, Colonial Revival
- NRHP reference No.: 96000773
- Added to NRHP: July 19, 1996

Rippavilla Plantation, also known as Meadowbrook and Nathaniel Cheairs House, is a former plantation, historic house and museum, located in Spring Hill, Tennessee. This plantation had been worked by enslaved Black people for many years. It is open to visitors as a historic house museum.

It is listed on the National Register of Historic Places on July 19, 1996, for its architectural significance.

== History ==
The Cheairs family were part of a 1810 land grant awarded by President James Madison. Initially the property included a 1500-acre farm. Nathaniel Frances Cheairs IV (1818–1914) resided on the property along with his wife, Susan Peters Cheairs (née McKissack; 1821–1893) until her death. Around 1840, the Cheairs family owned 46 enslaved black people and up to 75 by 1860 (Rippa Villa, Battle of Franklin Trust). Nathaniel Frances Cheairs IV served in the Confederate Army, however the Rippavilla Plantation sustained minimal damage during the American Civil War.

The plantation house was built in several phases but was extensively remodeled between 1928 and 1932. Its architectural style was antebellum Greek Revival, however modifications to the house were done in a 20th-century Colonial Revival style.

His son, William McKissack Cheairs took ownership of the home until he sold it in 1920 to John G. Whitfield, a coal tycoon from Alabama.
