= Tennessee State Route 396 =

State highway in Tennessee, United States

State Route 396
- Saturn Parkway

Route information
- Maintained by TDOT
- Length: 4.47 mi (7.19 km)
- Existed: 1985–present
- History: Completed in 1989

Major junctions
- West end: US 31 in Spring Hill
- East end: I-65 near Spring Hill

Location
- Country: United States
- State: Tennessee
- Counties: Maury, Williamson

Highway system
- Tennessee State Routes; Interstate; US; State
← SR 395	→ SR 397

State Route 396 (SR 396), commonly referred to as Saturn Parkway, is a 4.47-mile-long (7.19 km) (Note: The SR 396 designation officially begins in the center of an interchange with US 31, and ends in the center of an interchange with I-65. The Saturn Parkway name continues for approximately 1.3 miles (2.1 km) past US 31 onto a surface street. The southernmost 0.4 miles (0.64 km) of this street are maintained by TDOT, but not given a numerical designation.) east–west primary state route located in the city of Spring Hill in the U.S. state of Tennessee. The entire route is a controlled-access highway, and provides direct access between the General Motors Spring Hill Manufacturing plant and Interstate 65, as well as the business district of Spring Hill. It takes its name from Saturn Corporation, a subsidiary of General Motors that operated the plant from 1990 to 2007 as its sole manufacturing facility.

== Route description ==
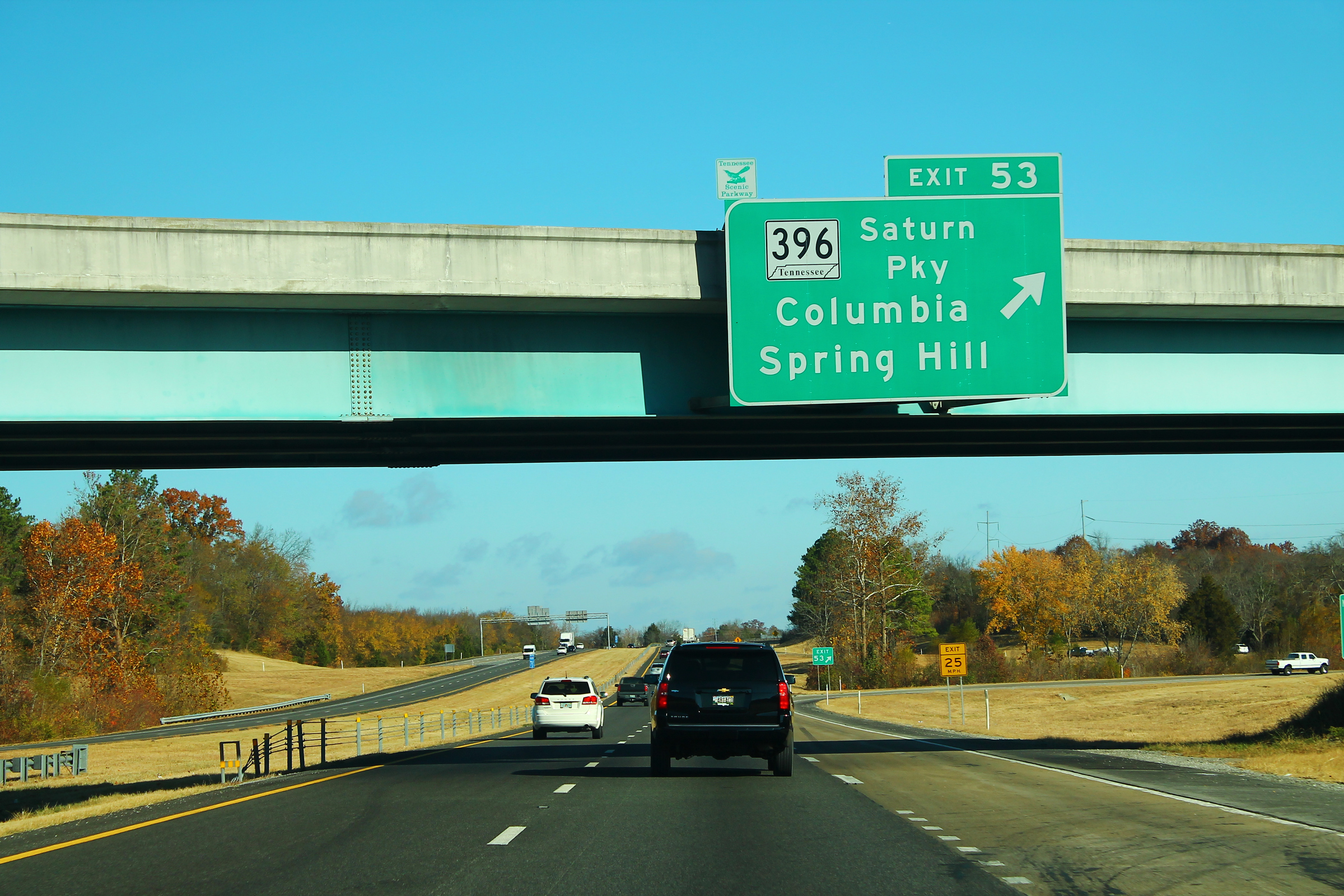
The eastern terminus of SR 396 on I-65 northbound

SR 396, most commonly known as Saturn Parkway, is a divided four-lane access-controlled facility its entire length. It is located within the southern part of the city of Spring Hill in Middle Tennessee approximately 42 miles (68 km) south of Nashville. Its primary purpose is to provide access between the General Motors (GM) automotive assembly plant and Interstate 65, as well as residential and commercial areas within Spring Hill. In 2025, annual average daily traffic (AADT) volumes on the parkway ranged from 37,084 vehicles per day at its midpoint to 39,829 vehicles per day at the western terminus. SR 396 is one of few non-Interstate Highways in the state with a 70-mile-per-hour (113 km/h) speed limit, which is allowed on all controlled-access highways in Tennessee.

SR 396 officially begins in the center of a three-level combination interchange with U.S. Route 31 (US 31) southwest of the business district of Spring Hill and west of the GM plant. This interchange contains two loop ramps and one flyover ramp, and utilizes separate ramps to provide access to and from US 31 northbound and southbound from both directions. Beyond this interchange, the roadway continues to the north for 1.3 mi (2.1 km) as an unnumbered surface street that retains the Saturn Parkway name, and provides the primary means of access to the GM plant. The highway then shifts east, where the speed limit increases from 55 to 70 miles per hour (89 to 113 km/h), and has a diamond interchange with Kedron Road directly south of the Spring Hill Battlefield. A short distance later, it has a diamond interchange with Port Royal Road, before shifting slightly northward and reaching its eastern terminus with I-65 at a trumpet interchange along the Maury-Williamson County line.

== History ==
The Tennessee Department of Transportation (TDOT) announced plans to build SR 396 on September 11, 1985, for a price of $29.3 million (equivalent to $74.4 million in 2025) as part of an effort to improve infrastructure around the then-future Saturn Plant, which had been announced three months prior. At the time, Spring Hill was a small agricultural community of approximately 1,000 residents. The environmental impact statement for the route was approved by the Federal Highway Administration (FHWA) on October 17, 1986. Contracts to construct SR 396 were awarded in November 1987, and construction began the following month. The parkway opened on August 7, 1989, in a ribbon-cutting ceremony officiated by then-Governor Ned McWherter. The final construction cost of the parkway was $37 million (equivalent to $83.5 million in 2025). The GM plant began operations the following year. TDOT considered using SR 396 for a section of Interstate 840, an outer southern bypass around Nashville, but planners ultimately chose a route approximately 6 miles (9.7 km) to the north.

Since the route's completion and the opening of the GM plant, Spring Hill has grown to contain more than 50,000 residents and continues to rapidly expand, necessitating improvements to the Saturn Parkway and other roads in the area. On May 30, 2018, work began on a 1.3-mile (2.1 km) long extension of the parkway from its western terminus at US 31 to SR 247 (Beechcroft Road). While technically not part of SR 396, this extension retains the Saturn Parkway name, and was constructed to improve traffic flow around the north end of the GM plant. The project also involved modifying the interchange with US 31 and widening and intersection improvements on SR 247. It was completed in September 2020. In 2019, traffic signals were installed at the interchange with Port Royal Road. On October 29, 2021, a ceremony was held designating the bridges over Kedron Road as the J.B. Napier and Shirley Napier Memorial Bridge, in honor of a former state representative and his wife.

== Major intersections ==
The entire route is in Spring Hill. All exits are unnumbered.

County	mi	km	Destinations	Notes
Maury	0.00	0.00	To SR 247 (GM Plant, Beechcroft Road)	Western terminus; road continues to the north as an unnumbered surface street that retains the Saturn Parkway name
Maury	0.00	0.00	US 31 (SR 6) – Spring Hill, Columbia	Combination interchange; separate exits for US 31 north and US 31 south
Maury	1.45	2.33	Kedron Road	Diamond interchange
Maury	3.18	5.12	Port Royal Road	Diamond interchange
Maury–Williamson county line	4.47	7.19	I-65 – Nashville, Huntsville	Trumpet interchange; eastern terminus; I-65 exit 53
1.000 mi = 1.609 km; 1.000 km = 0.621 mi
