= Spring Hill Manufacturing =

Automotive manufacturing facility in Spring Hill, Tennessee, United States

- Built: 1986 - 1990
- Operated: 1990 - present
- Location: 100 Saturn Parkway; Spring Hill, Tennessee, United States
- Coordinates: 35°44′24″N 86°57′54″W
- Products: Cadillac XT5; Cadillac Lyriq; Cadillac Vistiq
- Employees: 3,200
- Area: 2,000 acres (8.1 km^{2})
- Volume: 7,900,000 sq ft (730,000 m^{2})
- Owner: General Motors

Spring Hill Manufacturing is an automotive manufacturing plant in Spring Hill, Tennessee, United States, owned and operated by General Motors. The plant currently assembles the Cadillac XT5, Cadillac Lyriq and Cadillac Vistiq crossover SUVs for the North American market, and also includes powertrain, stamping and molding operations. It was developed from 1985 and launched in 1990 as the sole manufacturing facility for Saturn Corporation.

== History ==
On January 7, 1985, Saturn Corporation was formed as a subsidiary of General Motors to compete with Japanese imports, and soon searched for a site for a manufacturing facility. Governor Lamar Alexander began encouraging GM to locate the plant in Tennessee. The site in Spring Hill was officially announced on July 26, 1985. At the time, Spring Hill was a predominantly agricultural community with a population of about 1,000. A payment in lieu of taxes agreement was negotiated with the state in September 1985, and that same month the Tennessee Department of Transportation announced plans to construct State Route 396 (Saturn Parkway), a 5 mi (8.0 km) long controlled access highway that connects the plant to Interstate 65, at a cost of $29.3 million. This was completed in 1989. Preliminary site work for the plant began in May 1986, and construction activities began two months later. The plant began operation on July 31, 1990, when the first vehicle was produced.

The decision to locate one factory as the source of Saturn vehicles was based on a tradition GM was founded on in 1909 with the core brands that came together to form GM. Chevrolet, Pontiac, Oldsmobile, Buick and Cadillac each had main factories where the cars originated from, then in 1933 branch assembly plants were established in major American cities and the branch assembly locations would receive knock-down kits from the main plants and locally assemble GM products to meet demand. The main facilities were Flint, Michigan for both Buick and Chevrolet; Oldsmobile at Lansing, Michigan; Pontiac at Pontiac, Michigan; and Cadillac at Detroit, Michigan. The approach for Saturn was to have one dedicated location where vehicles originated from one location as in the past with the legacy brands.

Manufacturing continued through March 2004 as the sole assembly plant overseen by the Saturn subsidiary. After the United Auto Workers ratified a new contract in March 2004, the plant became part of General Motors, but Saturn-only manufacturing lines continued until March 2007. The facility includes a four-cylinder engine assembly plant, auto assembly plant, paint and plastics plant, a Saturn parts warehouse, and a visitors center. In 2005, the plant had a yearly production of 198,142 vehicles. Harbour Consulting rated the Ion line as the tenth most efficient auto plant in North America in 2006.

After GM considered idling or shutting down the plant as part of its restructuring effort, it idled in March 2007 for a 1-year retooling project to produce the 2009 Chevrolet Traverse after receiving incentives from the State of Tennessee. Changes include adding metal stamping and removing the plastics plant (the Saturn production lines used plastic-based panels). General Motors has stated the plant will manufacture various GM vehicles and no longer be dedicated to Saturns.

The vehicle assembly part of the Spring Hill plant was idled in late 2009 when production of the Traverse was moved to Lansing Delta Township Assembly near Lansing, MI, while production of power trains and metal stamping continued. Nearly 2,500 Spring Hill auto workers were faced with lay-offs, buy-outs and early retirement. In September 2011, it was announced that the plant would end its period of idling. In November 2011, GM announced plans for retooling of the vehicle assembly portion of the plant for use as an "ultra-flexible" plant which will initially be used to build the Chevrolet Equinox but will be designed for rapid retooling to other vehicles of similar size.

In 2015, the plant announced that it would be reopening the entire plant's facilities, and would hire locally creating thousands of jobs for the surrounding area. General Motors looks to expand the plant's facilities and influence in the North American and Global Auto industries, and as of 2021, was the company's largest plant in North America.

In January 2019, General Motors said it has invested $2 billion into the complex since 2010. In October 2020, GM announced that it was investing another $2 billion in the plant to build electric vehicles including the Cadillac Lyriq. In March 2024, production of the second generation Acura ZDX began at the facility.

== Products ==
=== Upcoming ===
- Chevrolet Blazer (crossover) (2027-)

=== Current ===
- Cadillac Vistiq (2026–present)
- Cadillac Lyriq (2023–present)
- Cadillac XT5 (2017–present)

=== Former ===
- Acura ZDX (2024–2025)
- Cadillac XT6 (2020–2025)
- GMC Acadia (2017–2023)
- Holden Acadia (2017–2021)
- Chevrolet Equinox (2013–2015)
- Chevrolet Traverse (2009–2010)
- Saturn Ion (2003–2007)
- Saturn Vue (2001–2007)
- Saturn S series (1991–2002)
