= Arrington, Tennessee =

Arrington
- Unincorporated community
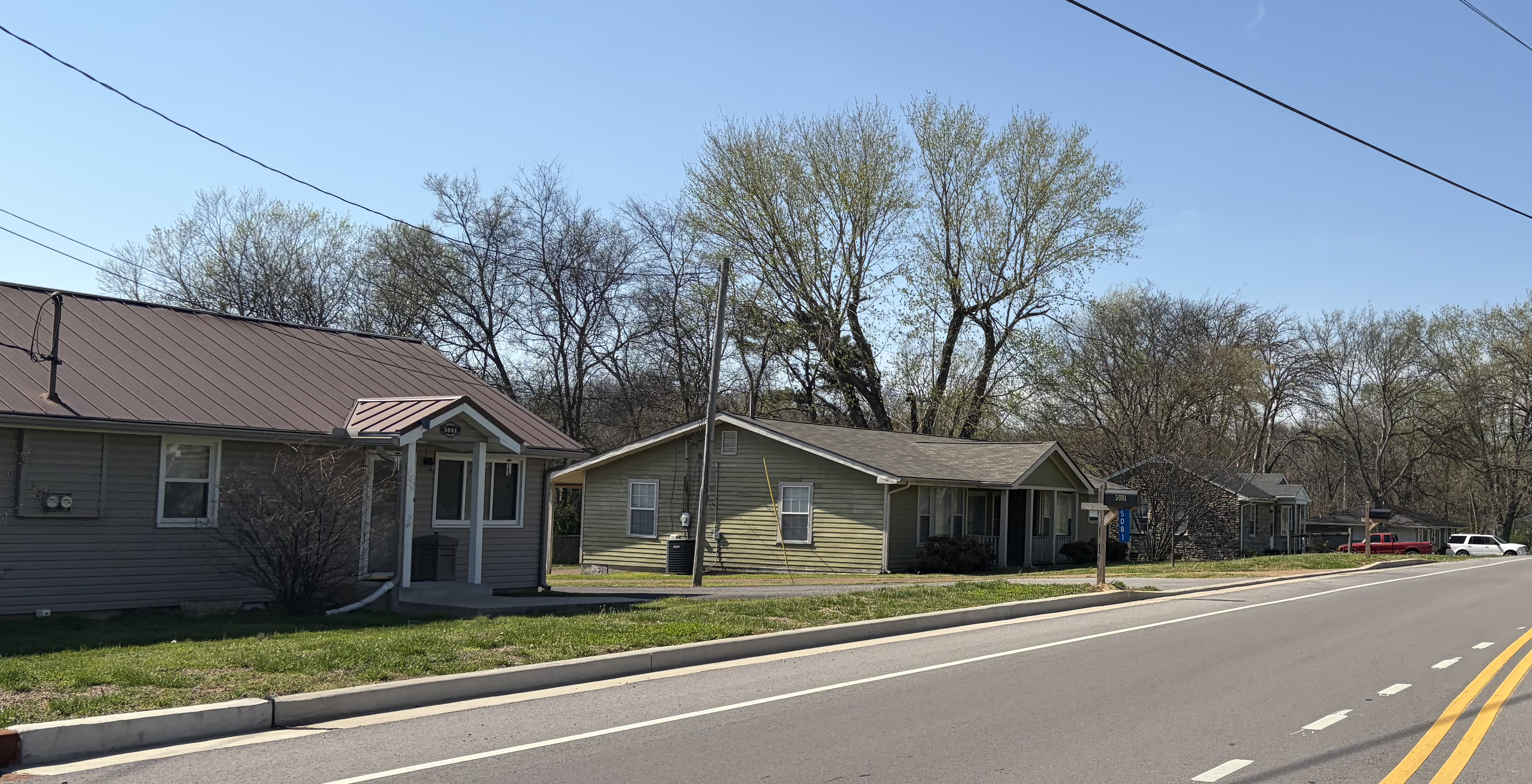
- Houses in Arrington

- Location within Tennessee Location within the United States
- Coordinates: 35°52′04.7″N 86°42′34.7″W
- Country: United States
- State: Tennessee
- Counties: Williamson
- Elevation: 696 ft (212 m)
- Time zone: UTC-6 (CST)
  - Summer (DST): UTC-5 (CDT)
- ZIP code: 37014
- Area codes: 615 and 629

Arrington is an unincorporated community near Franklin in Williamson County, Tennessee.

== History ==
The early settlement of “Petersburg” was granted a post office in 1858. At that time, the village's name was changed to Arrington for the nearby creek. Among the early families were Buchanan, Couch, Crockett, Duff, King, Morris, Paschall, Price, Roberts, and Sayers. Four churches were established; Bellview Cumberland Presbyterian (1852), Hopewell A.M.E. (1876), Patton's Chapel A.M.E. (1882), and First Baptist (1968). Arrington School and Patton's Chapel School were located on Cox Road. The original store and post office were on the west corner of Wilson Pike and Murfreesboro Road. When the railroad arrived in 1914, a depot was built. At one time, the village had two stores, a livery stable, grist mill, and blacksmith shop.

== King's Chapel ==
As early as 1804 Peter Cartwright, William McKendree, and Jacob Young were preaching the Methodist doctrine in southeastern Williamson County. In 1815 Kings' Chapel was constructed as an outgrowth of their campground meetings. In 1849, the congregation moved to a larger building, located just north of Triune, where the original cornerstone of Kings' Chapel is prominently displayed above the front door. The Union Army occupied the abandoned church during the Civil War, which became a dairy barn in the 20th Century. The families of John & Elaine Powell and William & Patricia Anton finished the reconstruction of Kings' Chapel on its original site using the same foundation stones and many of the original bricks in 2008.

Currently, a gated subdivision of the same name consisting of over 420 homes is built adjacent to the chapel.

The chapel is currently used by LifePoint Church, based in Smyrna, TN.
