= Duplex, Tennessee =

- Unincorporated community
- Location within Tennessee Location within the United States
- Coordinates: 35°44′49″N 86°50′14″W
- Country: United States
- State: Tennessee
- County: Williamson
- Elevation: 758 ft (231 m)
- Time zone: UTC-6 (Central (CST))
  - Summer (DST): UTC-5 (CDT)
- Area code: 615
- GNIS feature ID: 1314986

Duplex is an unincorporated community in Williamson County, in the U.S. state of Tennessee.

It is the location of, or nearest community to, at least two historic sites that are or once were listed on the National Register of Historic Places: the Thompson Store and Maplewood Farm.

The community itself was described as a crossroads community in a 1988 study of historic resources in the county. However, it was deemed not being worthy of listing on the National Register as a historic district, because too many of its older structures had been demolished and replaced.
