= Santa Fe, Tennessee =

- Unincorporated community
- Location within Tennessee Location within the United States
- Coordinates: 35°44′06″N 87°07′41″W
- Country: United States
- State: Tennessee
- County: Maury
- Elevation: 673 ft (205 m)
- Time zone: UTC-6 (Central (CST))
  - Summer (DST): UTC-5 (CDT)
- ZIP code: 38482
- Area code: 931
- GNIS feature ID: 1307028

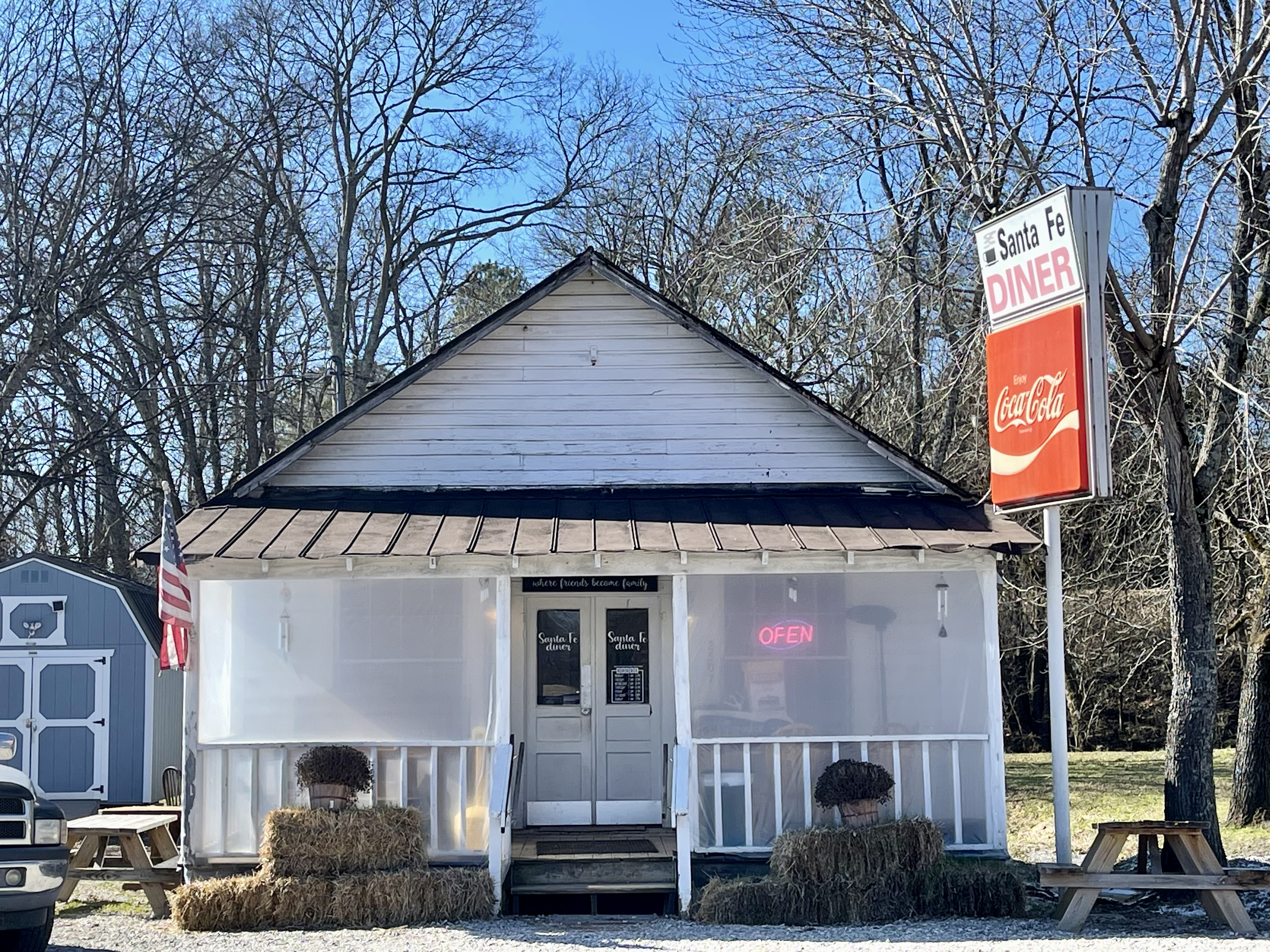
Santa Fe Diner in Santa Fe, TN

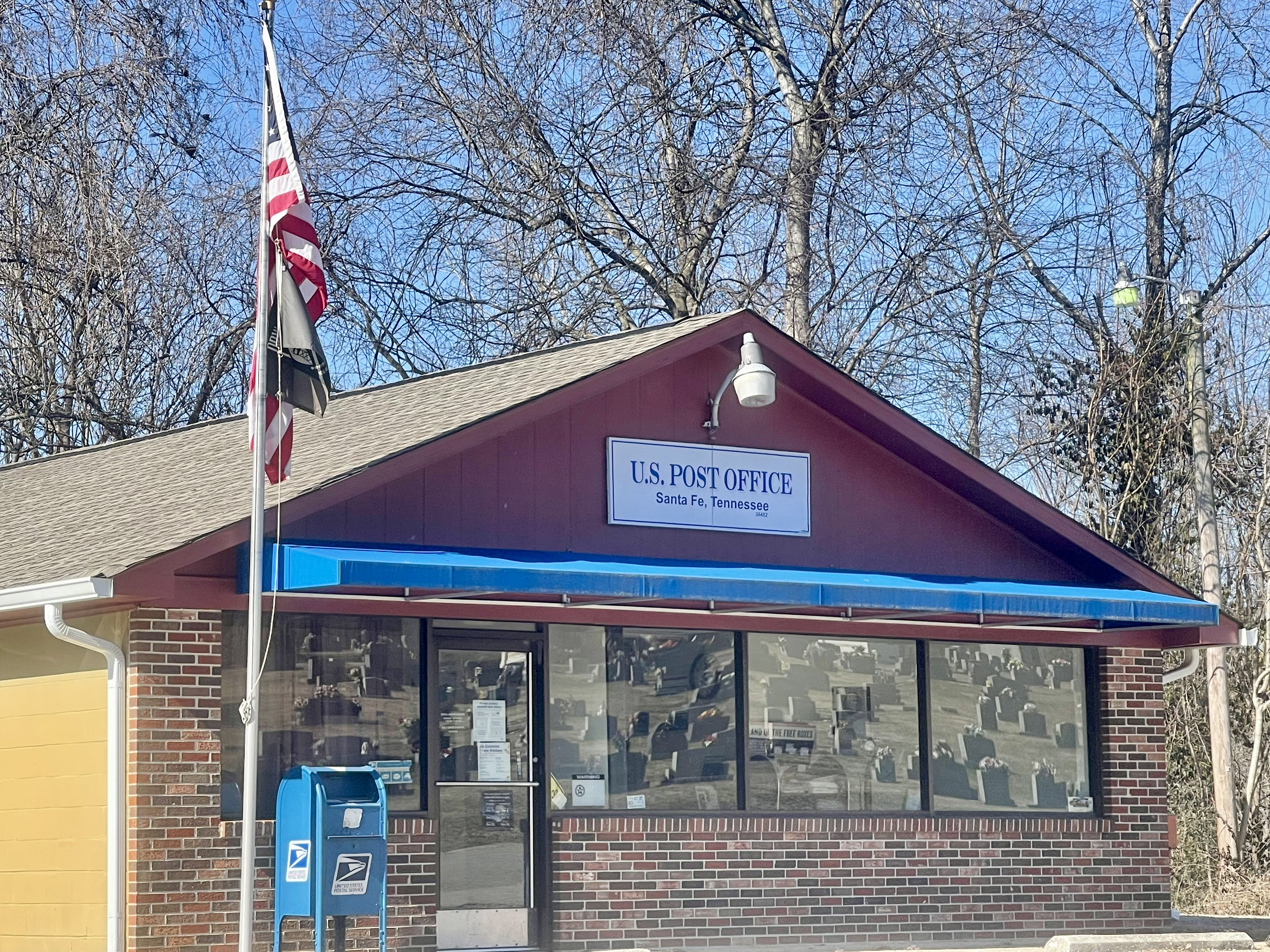
Santa Fe Post Office Built in 1849

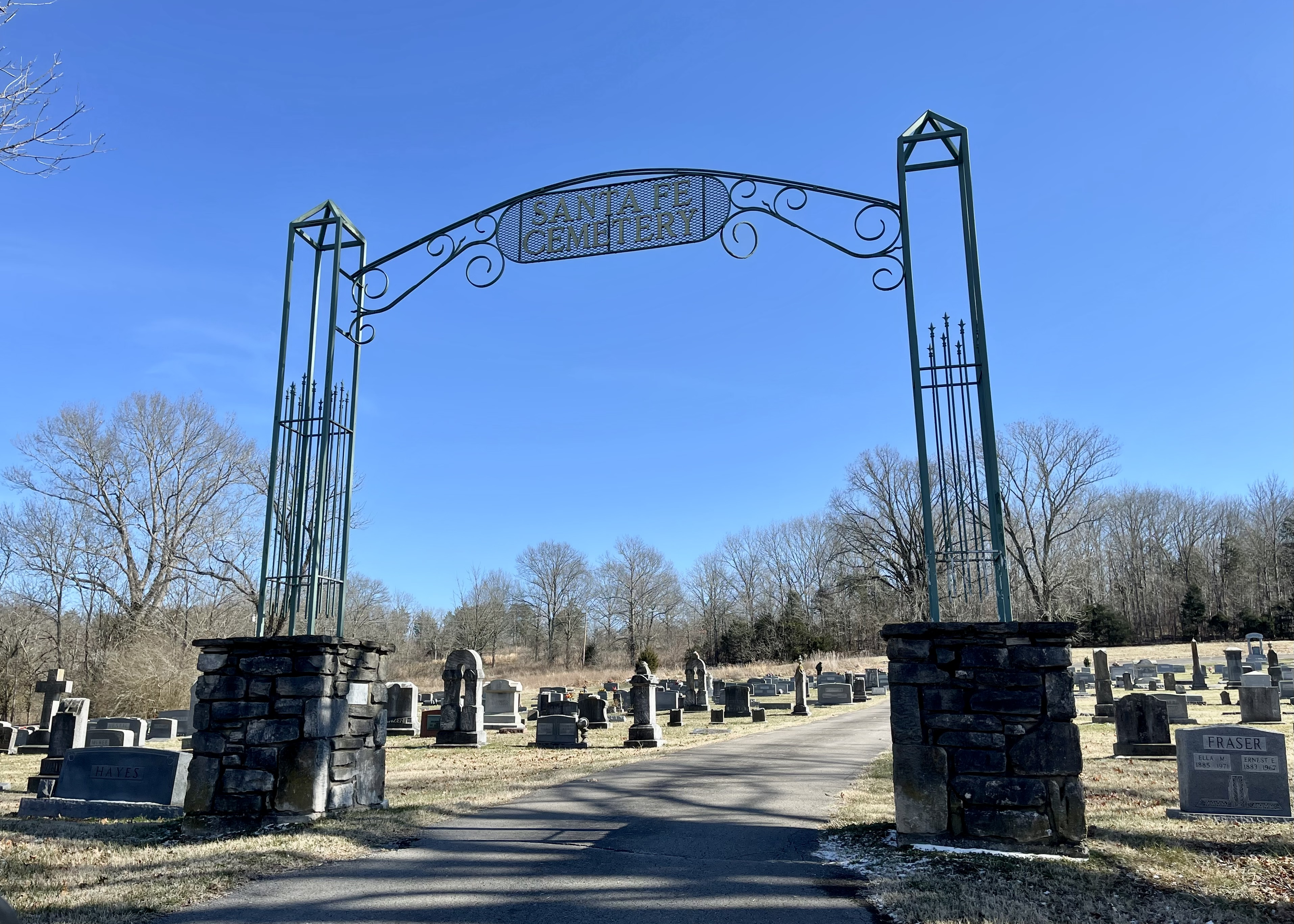
Santa Fe Cemetery entrance in Santa Fe, TN

Santa Fe (Pronounced as "SAN-tuh FEE") is an unincorporated community in Maury County, Tennessee, United States. Its ZIP code is 38482.

== History ==
A post office called Santa Fe was established in 1849. Variant names were "Benton" and "Pinhook." The name "Santa Fe" was adopted when the post office opened.
