= Burwood, Tennessee =

Unincorporated community in Tennessee, US

Coordinates: 35°48′45″N 86°59′00″W

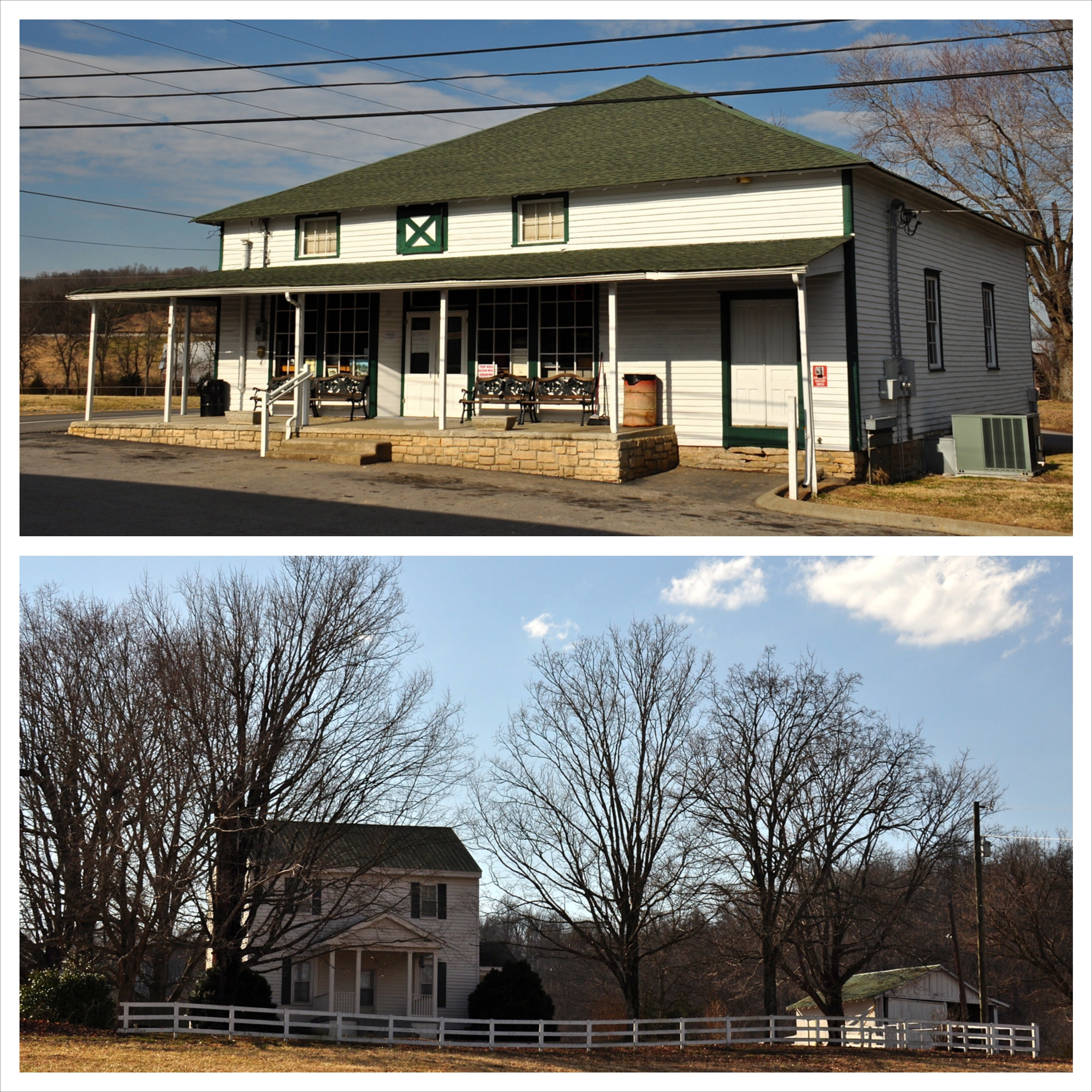
Huff's Store and the John Pope House, the two NRHP listings in Burwood, Tennessee

Burwood, Tennessee, is an unincorporated community in southwestern Williamson County, Tennessee.

== History ==
The hamlet was "originally named Williamsburg, later Shaw and ultimately Burwood."

In the middle decades of the 20th century, Burwood was a rural community that served as a trading center for area farmers, while much business moved to the city of Franklin.

Burwood is the location of the John Pope House and the Huff Store, which are listed on the National Register of Historic Places.

The opening, in 2012, of the segment of SR 840 (now signed as Interstate 840) near Burwood was expected to lead to increased economic activity in the community.
