= Spring Hill, Tennessee =

- City
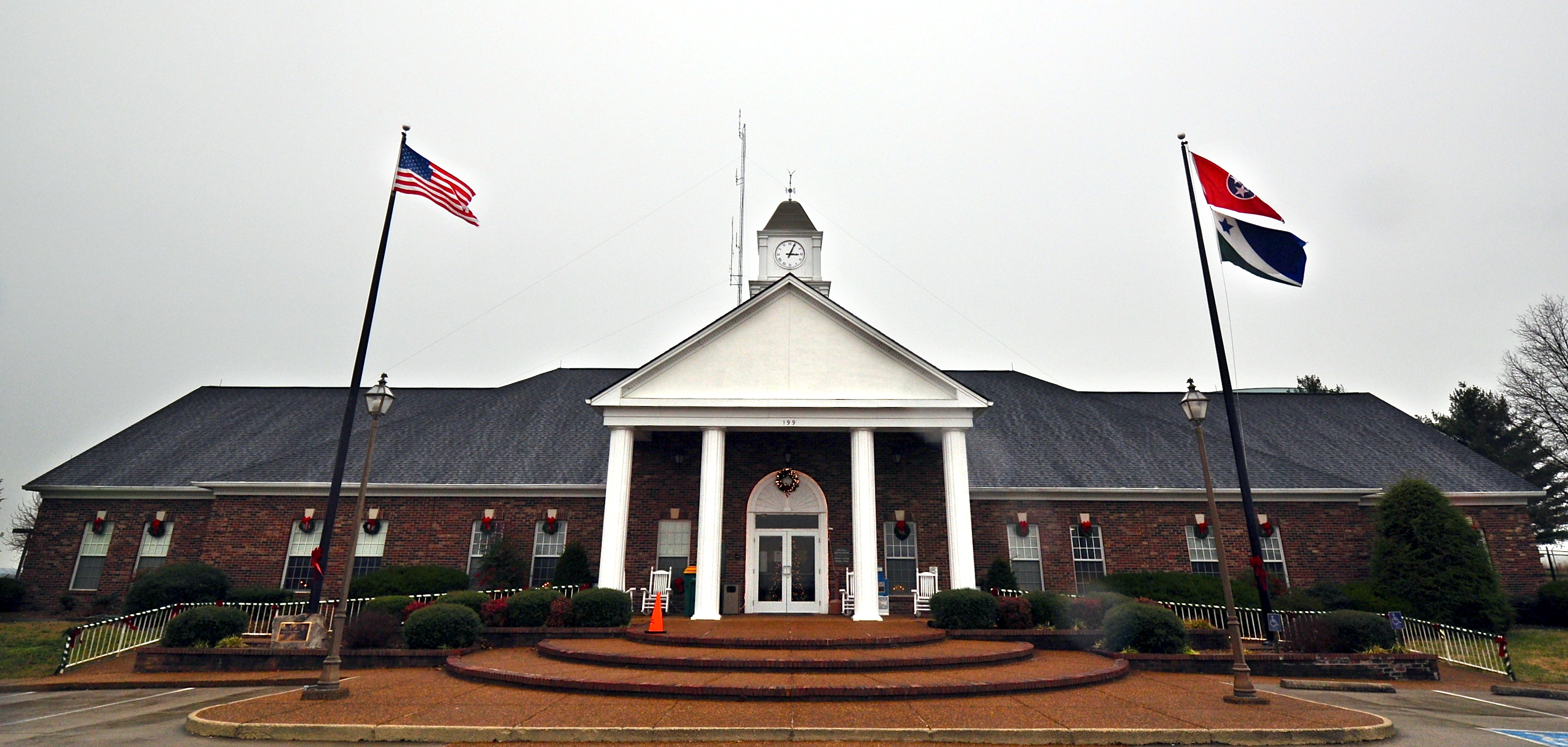
- Spring Hill City Hall in December 2013

- Flag Seal Logo
- Motto: "A blend of Commerce, History and Country Living"
- Location of Spring Hill in Williamson and Maury County, Tennessee (left) and of both counties in Tennessee (right)
- Coordinates: 35°45′9″N 86°54′50″W
- Country: United States
- State: Tennessee
- Counties: Williamson, Maury
- City: 1808

Government
  - Type: City
  - Mayor: Matt Fitterer
  - Vice Mayor: Trent Linville

Area
  - Total: 29.14 sq mi (75.47 km^{2})
  - Land: 29.09 sq mi (75.35 km^{2})
  - Water: 0.046 sq mi (0.12 km^{2})
- Elevation: 751 ft (229 m)

Population (2020)
  - Total: 50,005 ▲
  - Estimate (2024): 59,398 ▲
  - Density: 1,718.7/sq mi (663.61/km^{2})
- Time zone: UTC-6 (Central (CST))
  - Summer (DST): UTC-5 (CDT)
- ZIP code: 37174 also includes portion of 37179
- Area code: 931 615
- FIPS code: 47-70580
- GNIS feature ID: 1303764
- Website: www.springhilltn.org

Spring Hill is a city in Maury and Williamson counties in the U.S. state of Tennessee, located approximately 30 miles (48 km) south of Nashville. Its population as of 2024 is 59,398. Spring Hill is recognized as the 4th fastest growing city in Tennessee by the U.S. Census Bureau and is included in the Nashville metropolitan area.

== History ==
The first settlers of Spring Hill arrived in 1808 and the city was established in 1809. Albert Russell was the first person to build a home on the land that became Spring Hill.

Spring Hill was the site of a Civil War battle, now known as the Battle of Spring Hill, on November 29, 1864.

Later, Spring Hill was the home of a preparatory school, Branham and Hughes Military Academy, the campus of which then served as the main campus of Tennessee Children's Home, a ministry associated with the Churches of Christ.

On January 10, 1963, an F3 tornado tore through the center of the town, damaging many buildings and causing $500,000 in damage.

=== Recent growth ===
As the Nashville metro area continues to grow, Spring Hill has seen rapid growth in recent years with a population of 23,462 in 2007, a 2010 census population of 29,036 and a population of 31,140 in 2012. In 2018, Spring Hill officially hit 40,000 residents.

In November 2015, the Spring Hill Board of Mayor and Aldermen approved the ‘Spring Hill Rising: 2040’ comprehensive plan. The plan outlines the city's long-term development vision and ways to accomplish that vision. In 2016, the city hired Chicago-based planning and zoning consultant, Camiros Ltd, to oversee the creation of a new zoning code to implement the vision described in ‘Spring Hill Rising: 2040’.

On December 4, 2017, entities building a Chick-fil-A tore down a grain silo. A memorial plaque to the silo opened in 2018. The silo had no major recorded history but was perceived by the town community as a landmark that signaled the beginning of the town. The idea of the memorial was originally posited as a joke but became serious.

== Geography ==
Spring Hill is located at 35°45′9″N 86°54′50″W (35.752556, -86.914021).

According to the United States Census Bureau, the city has a total area of 29.14 square miles (75.5 km^{2}), of which 29.09 square miles (75.3 km^{2}) is land and 0.05 square miles (0.13 km^{2}) (0.17%) is water.

== Demographics ==
Historical population
Census	Pop.	Note	%±
1880	400		—
1910	695		—
1920	403		−42.0%
1930	416		3.2%
1940	543		30.5%
1950	541		−0.4%
1960	689		27.4%
1970	685		−0.6%
1980	989		44.4%
1990	1,464		48.0%
2000	7,715		427.0%
2010	29,036		276.4%
2020	50,005		72.2%
2025 (est.)	61,336	▲	22.7%

=== 2020 census ===
As of the 2020 census, Spring Hill had a population of 50,005, with 17,211 households and 10,582 families residing in the city.

There were 17,211 households in Spring Hill, of which 46.3% had children under the age of 18 living in them. Of all households, 61.9% were married-couple households, 11.9% were households with a male householder and no spouse or partner present, and 21.7% were households with a female householder and no spouse or partner present. About 18.8% of all households were made up of individuals and 6.0% had someone living alone who was 65 years of age or older.

The median age was 34.3 years. 30.8% of residents were under the age of 18 and 10.1% of residents were 65 years of age or older. For every 100 females there were 94.1 males, and for every 100 females age 18 and over there were 89.8 males age 18 and over.

97.8% of residents lived in urban areas, while 2.2% lived in rural areas.

There were 17,939 housing units, of which 4.1% were vacant. The homeowner vacancy rate was 1.3% and the rental vacancy rate was 7.1%.

Racial composition as of the 2020 census
Race	Number	Percent
White	40,708	81.4%
Black or African American	2,987	6.0%
American Indian and Alaska Native	155	0.3%
Asian	1,098	2.2%
Native Hawaiian and Other Pacific Islander	35	0.1%
Some other race	1,291	2.6%
Two or more races	3,731	7.5%
Hispanic or Latino (of any race)	3,933	7.9%

=== 2010 census ===
As of the 2010 United States census, there were 29,036 people, 9,861 households, and 7,884 families living in the city. The population density was 1,640.45 persons per square mile and the housing unit density was 557.12 units per square mile. The racial makeup of the city was 89.14% White, 5.39% Black or African American, 1.64% Asian, 0.24% Native American, 0.17% Pacific Islander, 1.53% from other races, and 1.90% from two or more races. Those of Hispanic or Latino origins were 5.65% of the population.

Of the 9,861 households, 50.34% had children under the age of 18 living in them, 67.26% were married couples living together, 2.80% had a male householder with no wife present, 9.89% had a female householder with no husband present, and 20.05% were non-families. 16.49% of all households were made up of individuals, and 3.26% had someone living alone who was 65 years of age or older. The average household size was 2.94 and the average family size was 3.33.

Of the 29,036 residents, 33.89% were under the age of 18, 61.08% were between the ages of 18 and 64, and 5.02% were 65 years of age or older. The median age was 31.9 years. 51.46% of the residents were female, and 48.54% were male.

The median household income in the city was $72,744 and the median family income was $78,125. Males had a median income of $54,905 versus $42,216 for females. The per capita income for the city was $27,709. About 2.8% of families and 3.6% of the population were below the poverty line, including 4.4% of those under the age of 18 and 2.9% of those age 65 and over.

== Economy ==
Spring Hill was the site of the Saturn Corporation production facility, which operated from 1990 to 2007. The Saturn S-Series, Saturn ION, and Saturn VUE were produced there. In 2007, General Motors Corporation (GM), the parent company of Saturn, shut down the facility to retool it for production of other GM vehicles and renamed it Spring Hill Manufacturing. The plant reopened in February 2008 and became the assembly point for the new Chevrolet Traverse. However, after a battle among plants in Spring Hill, Orion Township, Michigan and Janesville, Wisconsin, GM announced on June 26, 2009, that they had chosen to build a new small car in Orion Township. Nearly 2,500 Spring Hill auto workers were faced with lay-off, buy-out and early retirement. The vehicle assembly part of the Spring Hill plant was idled in late 2009 when production of the Traverse was moved to Lansing, Michigan, while production of power trains and metal stamping continued. In November 2011, GM announced plans for retooling of the vehicle assembly portion of the plant for use as an "ultra-flexible" plant which will initially be used to build the Chevy Equinox and GMC Terrain but will be designed for rapid retooling to other vehicles of similar size. In April 2021 General Motors and South Korean joint-venture partner LG Energy Solutions stated they would build a second Ultium Cells battery cell manufacturing plant in Spring Hill, having revealed plans for a $2.3 billion plant that is operating as of March 2024.

Spring Hill has gone through rapid development and growth in recent years, causing General Motors to reopen their auto plant and begin hiring locally again, which will hire 1,000 new people. In addition, companies such as Ryder and Goodwill have announced new facilities in the Spring Hill area.

== Government ==
Spring Hill is run by a mayor elected at-large and a board of eight aldermen.

== Education ==
The city is served by both Maury County Public Schools and the Williamson County School District, depending on which county one is located in.

Notable schools

- Spring Hill High School

== Infrastructure ==
Interstate 65 passes through the eastern part of the city. Two exits are within Spring Hill city limits. Exit 53 serves Tennessee State Route 396. Exit 55, at June Lake Blvd, opened on May 31, 2024, and serves the northern part of the city and Southern Williamson County. State Route 396, known locally as Saturn Parkway, provides an east–west freeway connection into the city with two exits before terminating at Beechcroft Road near the GM plant. U.S. Route 31 is the main north–south arterial through Spring Hill. It is alternatively called both Columbia Pike on the south side of town and Nashville Highway on the north side. State Route 247 is a major east–west road through the city.

== Arts and culture ==
Rippavilla Plantation, which is located at 5700 Main Street (US 31, Nashville Highway), offers educational activities and an annual corn maze among other attractions. The historic Battle of Spring Hill site is located off Kedron Road and is open for self-guided tours year round.

Some scenes from the 1986 movie At Close Range, starring Sean Penn, Christopher Walken, and Kiefer Sutherland, were filmed in Spring Hill.

== Notable residents ==
- Julie Hayden, a 17-year old teacher murdered by the White Man's League in 1874 in Hartsville.
- Peter Jenkins, (American travel author), (born August 7, 1951), an American travel author known for walking from New York to Oregon between October 1973 and January 1979 while writing a bestselling book, A Walk Across America. He has since written several travel related books and holds an honorary doctorate from Alfred University (2003).
- Sterling Marlin, a NASCAR driver and two-time winner of the Daytona 500.
- Chris Moneymaker, a professional poker player and winner of the main event at the 2003 WSOP.
