= Beech Hill =

Beech Hill may refer to the following places:

- Beech Hill, Berkshire, England
- Beech Hill (Dublin, New Hampshire)
- Beech Hill (Delaware County, New York), an elevation
- Beech Hill, Nova Scotia, Canada
- Beech Hill, Georgia, a ghost town
- Beech Hill, Tennessee (disambiguation), United States
- Beech Hill, West Virginia, United States
- Beech Hill (Victoria), a small mountain in West Gippsland, Victoria, Australia
