= Olivet =

Olivet may refer to:

== Places ==
=== France ===
- Olivet, Loiret, in the Loiret département
- Olivet, Mayenne, in the Mayenne département

=== Middle East ===
- The Mount of Olives, on the east side of Jerusalem

=== United States ===
- Olivet, Illinois
- Olivet, Kansas
- Olivet, Michigan
- Olivet, New Jersey
- Olivet, South Dakota
- Olivet, Tennessee
- Olivet, Giles County, Tennessee
- Olivet, Wisconsin
- Mount Olivet, Kentucky

== People ==
- Pierre-Joseph Thoulier d'Olivet (1682-1768), French abbot, writer, grammarian and translator

== Arts, entertainment, and media ==
- Dr. Elizabeth Olivet, a fictional character in the Law & Order television franchise
- The Olivet Discourse or Olivet prophecy or Little Apocalypse, a New Testament biblical passage found in the Synoptic Gospels

== Education ==
- Olivet College in Olivet, Michigan
- Olivet Nazarene University in Bourbonnais, Illinois; named for Olivet, Illinois
- Olivet University, headquartered in San Francisco, California

== Other uses ==
- Olivet, one of two tram cars on the Angels Flight funicular in Los Angeles, California

== See also ==
- Olivette (disambiguation)
