= Five Points, Tennessee =

Five Points, Tennessee may refer to the following places in Tennessee:

- Five Points, Giles County, Tennessee
- Five Points, Lawrence County, Tennessee
- Five Points, Madison County, Tennessee
- Five Points, Rhea County, Tennessee
