= Weakley =

Weakley may refer to:

== People ==
- Alan S. Weakley (born 1959), American botanist
- Dwight Weakley (born 1969), Bahamian cricketer
- Ian Weakley (born 1974), Jamaican hurdler
- Robert Weakley (1764–1845), American politician from Tennessee

== Locations ==
- Weakley, Tennessee, an unincorporated community in Giles County
- Weakley County, Tennessee

== Newspaper ==
- Weakley County Press, a newspaper in Martin, Tennessee.
