= Appleton Farm =

Historic house in New Hampshire, United States

- U.S. National Register of Historic Places
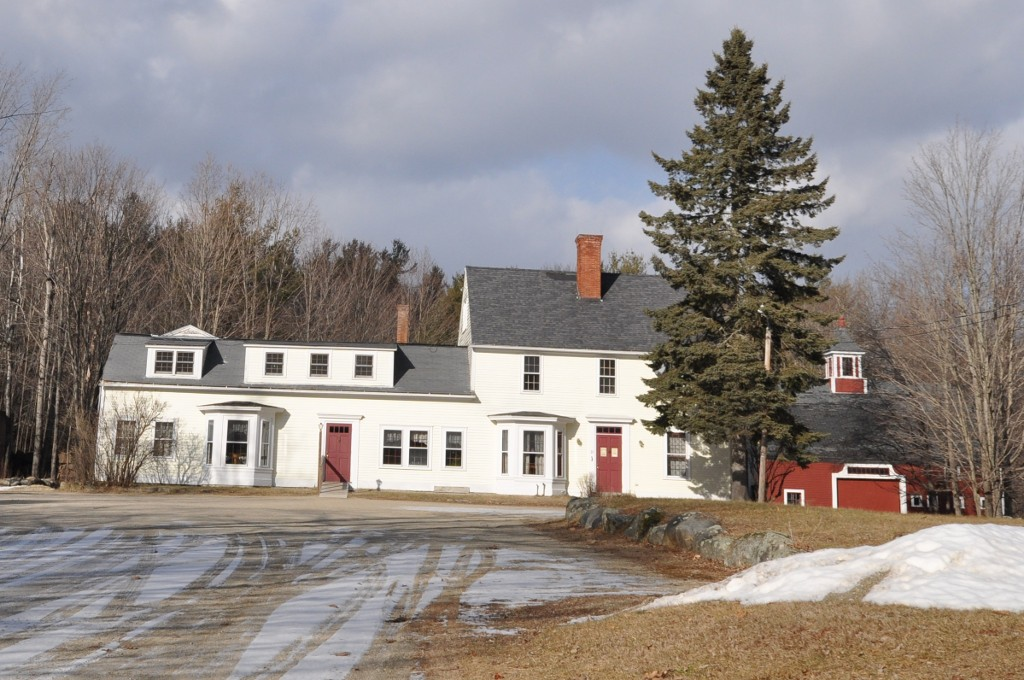

- Location within New Hampshire Location within the United States
- Location: 73 Brush Brook Rd., Dublin, New Hampshire
- Coordinates: 42°54′26″N 72°1′24″W
- Area: 1 acre (0.40 ha)
- Built: 1786
- Architectural style: Georgian
- MPS: Dublin MRA
- NRHP reference No.: 83004008
- Added to NRHP: December 18, 1983

Appleton Farm is a historic farmstead at 76 Brush Brook Road in Dublin, New Hampshire. It has housed Del Rossi's Trattoria for many years. It was built in the 1780s by the son of one of Dublin's early settlers, and remained in the family until 1950. The house and adjacent barn were listed on the National Register of Historic Places in 1983.

== Description and history ==
Appleton Farm is located on the west side of Brush Brook Road (New Hampshire Route 137), about 0.25 miles (0.40 km) north of its junction with New Hampshire Route 101. The property includes the farmhouse and a barn on about 1 acre (0.40 ha). The house is a 2½-story wood-frame structure, with a gabled roof, central chimney, and clapboarded exterior. A single-story ell extends to the left side of the main block, with shed-roof dormers on its front roof face. The main facade is three bays wide, with a center entrance flanked by sash windows, except that the one to its left has been replaced by a Victorian-era polygonal window bay. The barn is also framed in wood and finished in clapboards, and has a square cupola at the center of its roof.

The house was built c. 1786-89 by Francis Appleton Jr., and was in the Appleton family until 1950. Appleton was the son of one of the area's early proprietors. His son and grandson, both owners of this property, were active in local affairs, serving as town selectman and in the state legislature. After it was sold out of the family, it was used for a time as staff housing for an alcoholic rehabilitation facility at Beech Hill. It has housed Del Rossi's Trattoria, an Italian restaurant, since 1989.

== See also ==
- National Register of Historic Places listings in Cheshire County, New Hampshire
