= Interstate 65 in Tennessee =

Interstate Highway in Tennessee, United States

Interstate 65
- I-65 highlighted in red

Route information
- Maintained by TDOT
- Length: 121.71 mi (195.87 km)
- Existed: August 14, 1957–present
- History: Completed October 26, 1973
- NHS: Entire route

Major junctions
- South end: I-65 / US 31 at the Alabama state line in Ardmore
- US 64 near Frankewing; US 412 in Columbia; SR 396 near Spring Hill; I-840 near Franklin; I-440 in Nashville; US 70 / US 431 in Nashville; I-40 in Nashville; I-24 in Nashville; US 31E / US 41 / SR 155 in Nashville; SR 386 in Goodlettsville
- North end: I-65 at the Kentucky state line near Portland

Location
- Country: United States
- State: Tennessee
- Counties: Giles, Marshall, Maury, Williamson, Davidson, Sumner, Robertson

Highway system
- Interstate Highway System; Main; Auxiliary; Suffixed; Business; Future; Tennessee State Routes; Interstate; US; State
← SR 64	→ SR 65

Interstate 65 (I-65) is part of the Interstate Highway System that runs 887.30 miles (1,427.97 km) north–south from Mobile, Alabama, to Gary, Indiana. In Tennessee, I-65 traverses the middle portion of the state, running from Ardmore at the Alabama border to the Kentucky border near Portland. The route serves the state capital and largest city of Nashville, along with many of its suburbs. Outside of urban areas, the Interstate bypasses most cities and towns that it serves, instead providing access via state and U.S. Highways. The Interstate passes through the Highland Rim and Nashville Basin physiographic regions of Tennessee, and is often used as the dividing line between the eastern and western portions of the former.

Of the four states which I-65 runs through, the segment in Tennessee is the shortest, at 121.71 miles (195.87 km) long. I-65 parallels the older U.S. Route 31 (US 31) and US 31W corridors for its entire length in Tennessee. The first section of Interstate Highway constructed in Tennessee under the Federal-Aid Highway Act of 1956 was the southernmost section of I-65, opened in 1958. The Interstate was completed between Nashville and the Alabama state line in 1967, and the final section, located in Nashville, opened in 1973. Since its completion, the rapid growth of the Nashville metropolitan area, as well as the general increase in traffic, has necessitated many widening and reconstruction projects. I-65 contains the first high-occupancy vehicle lanes constructed in Tennessee, as well as the widest stretch of road in the state. From 1971 to 2000, the Interstate had one auxiliary route, I-265, which was decommissioned when I-65 was rerouted to reduce congestion in Nashville.

== Route description ==
I-65 is maintained by the Tennessee Department of Transportation (TDOT), along with all other Interstate, US, and state highways in Tennessee. In 2025, annual average daily traffic (AADT) counts ranged from 24,220 vehicles per day at the Alabama state line (which is one of the lowest traffic volumes on any mainline Interstate Highway in Tennessee) to 188,694 vehicles per day on the concurrent section with I-24 in Nashville, which was the busiest section of road in Tennessee.

=== Southern Highland Rim, Nashville Basin, and Nashville suburbs ===
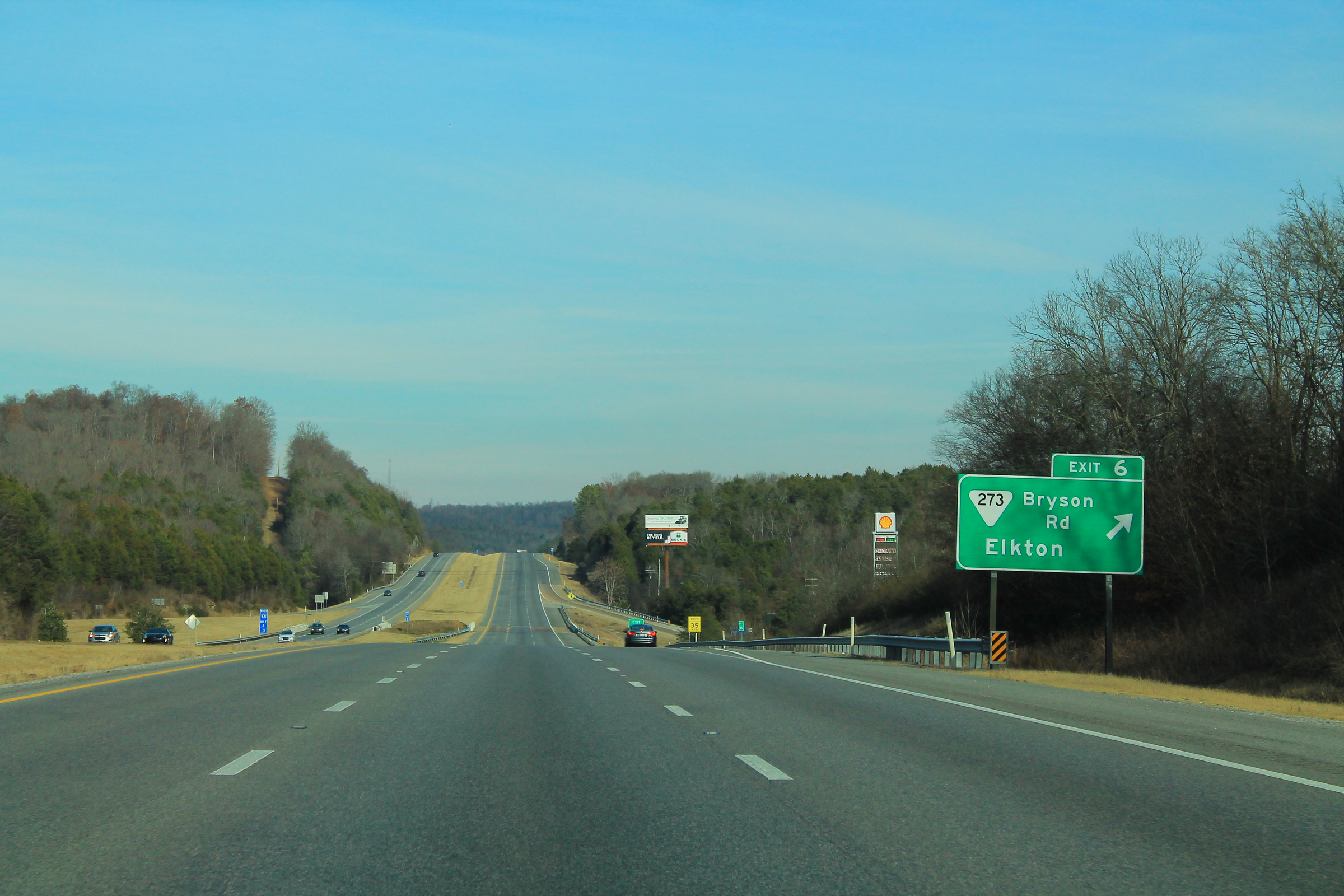
I-65 near the Alabama state line. The extra right lane serves as an acceleration lane for trucks entering from a weigh station.

I-65 enters Tennessee from Alabama in rural Giles County near the town of Ardmore, running concurrently with U.S. Route 31 (US 31). About 1.5 miles (2.4 km) later, near the town of Elkton, is an interchange with State Route 7 (SR 7), where US 31 splits off into a concurrency with that route, heading north toward Pulaski. Continuing through mostly rural territory characterized by slight rolling hills, I-65 gradually descends off of the Highland Rim into the Nashville Basin, and crosses the Elk River. About 10 miles (16 km) later, the Interstate has an interchange with US 64 near the Frankewing community, which also serves Pulaski to the west and Fayetteville to the east. I-65 meanders over the next several miles through a series of irregular hills and valleys characteristic of the region's topography, and contains several minor curves along this stretch. It then crosses into Marshall County and immediately has an interchange with US 31A near the town of Cornersville, which also serves as a connector to Lewisburg. Bypassing Lewisburg to the west, I-65 passes through an artificial cut in a ridge, and traverses additional hilly terrain that is mostly wooded before straightening out. Immediately after entering Maury County is an interchange with SR 50, which serves Columbia to the northwest and Lewisburg to the southeast. Bypassing Columbia to the east, I-65 crosses the Duck River and, after some distance, has an interchange with SR 99 and the eastern terminus of US 412.

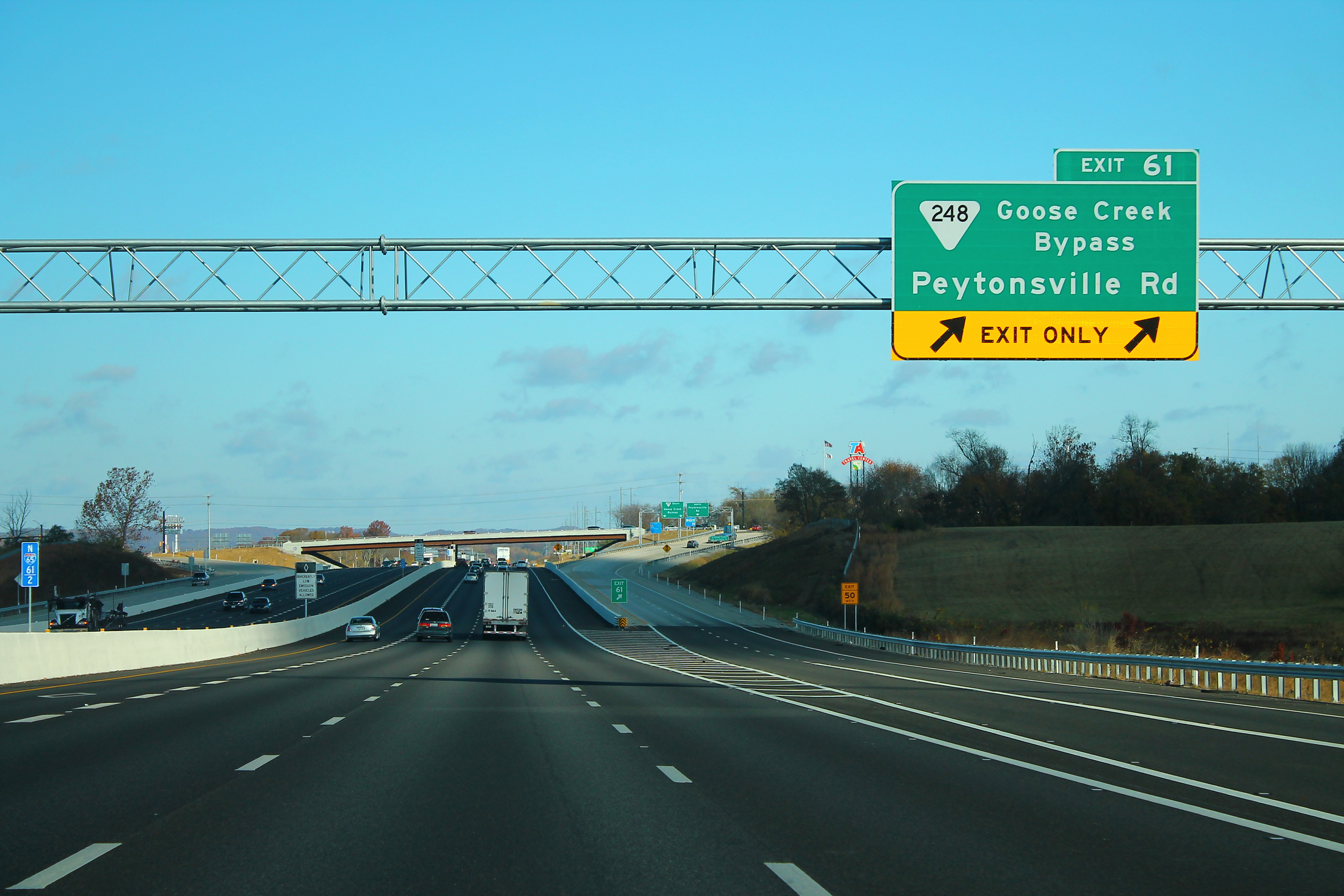
I-65 northbound near Franklin

After about seven miles (11 km), I-65 crosses into Williamson County and has an interchange with the eastern terminus of SR 396 (Saturn Parkway), a freeway spur that serves Spring Hill and the General Motors Spring Hill Manufacturing plant. After passing east of Spring Hill and the town of Thompson's Station, the freeway widens to six lanes and reaches a combination interchange with I-840, which serves as an outer southern bypass of Nashville. The Interstate receives eight lanes from this interchange, with the left lanes serving as high-occupancy vehicle lanes (HOV lanes) during rush hour. I-65 has an interchange with the eastern terminus of SR 248 (Goose Creek Bypass) southeast of Franklin, one of the principal cities of the Nashville metropolitan area. Entering the eastern part of Franklin, the Interstate crosses the Harpeth River and has interchanges with SR 96 (a major arterial route that also serves Murfreesboro to the east), McEwen Drive, Cool Springs Boulevard, and SR 441 (Moores Lane). The highway then leaves Franklin, enters Brentwood, and has an interchange with SR 253 (Concord Road) a little over two miles (3.2 km) later. Passing through the center of Brentwood, the Interstate crosses into Davidson County about three miles (4.8 km) later and immediately has an interchange with SR 254 (Old Hickory Boulevard), which is considered the second Brentwood exit due to its extreme proximity.

=== Nashville to Kentucky ===
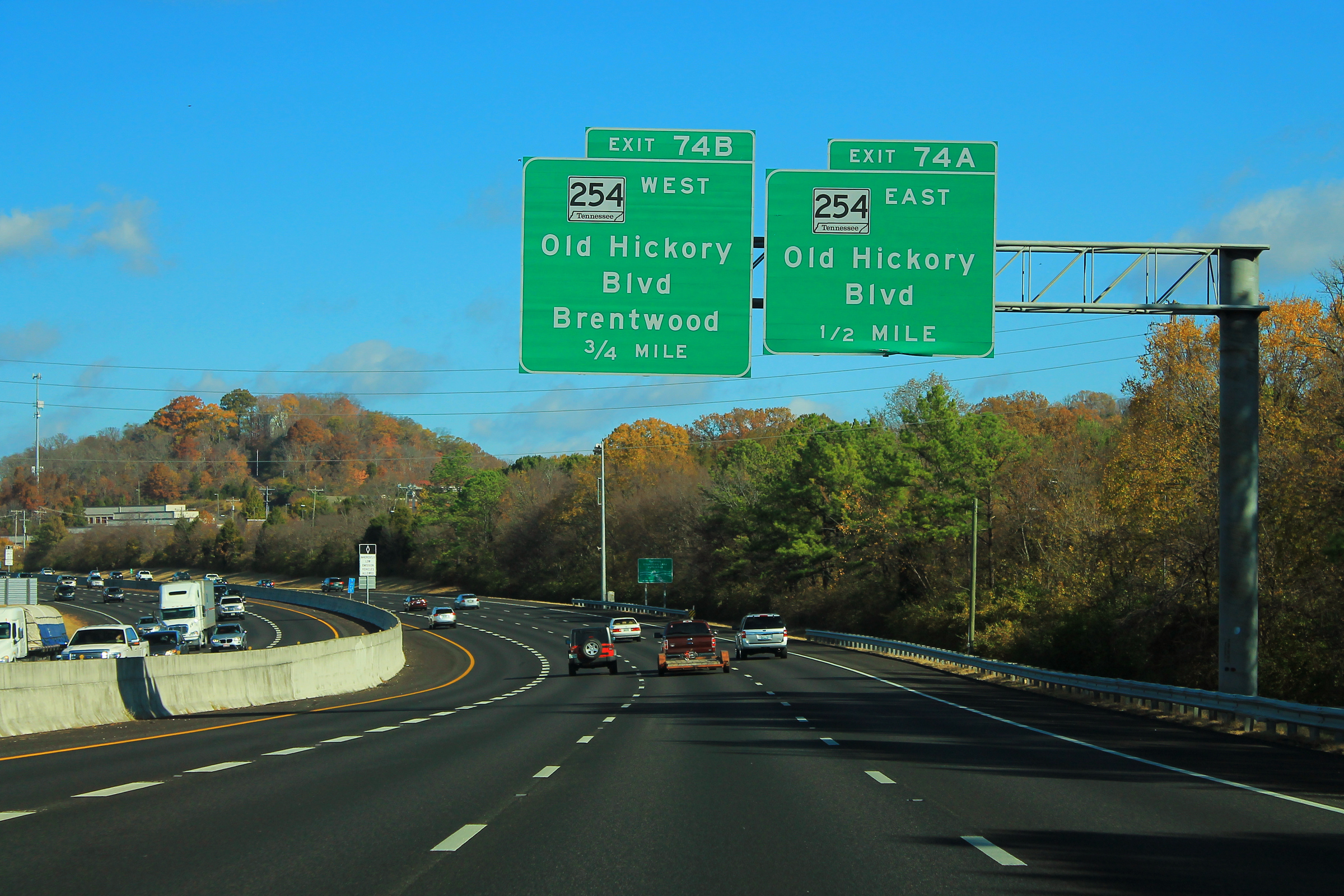
I-65 northbound in Brentwood near the Davidson County line

Serving as the boundary between Oak Hill and the southern neighborhoods of Nashville, I-65 has an interchange with SR 255 (Harding Place) about three miles (4.8 km) later. The HOV lane restrictions then end, and the freeway widens to 10 lanes. On the border between Berry Hill and Nashville is a four-level spaghetti junction stack interchange with I-440, a southern bypass of downtown Nashville. Here, I-65 reduces to six lanes, and a little over two miles (3.2 km) later, enters downtown Nashville and begins a brief concurrency with I-40. The mile and exit numbers during the concurrency are numbered using I-40's mileage. Forming part of the Downtown Loop, the set of Interstate Highways that encircle downtown Nashville, the routes pass near Music Row and the neighborhoods of The Gulch and SoBro, and shift sharply to the west, before shifting to the northwest. In short succession are interchanges with Demonbreun Street, US 70S/US 431 (Broadway), and US 70 (Charlotte Avenue). About one mile (1.6 km) later, I-40 splits off to the west, heading toward Memphis, and I-65 curves sharply to the northeast, reaching an interchange with US 41A (Rosa L. Parks Boulevard) immediately beyond.

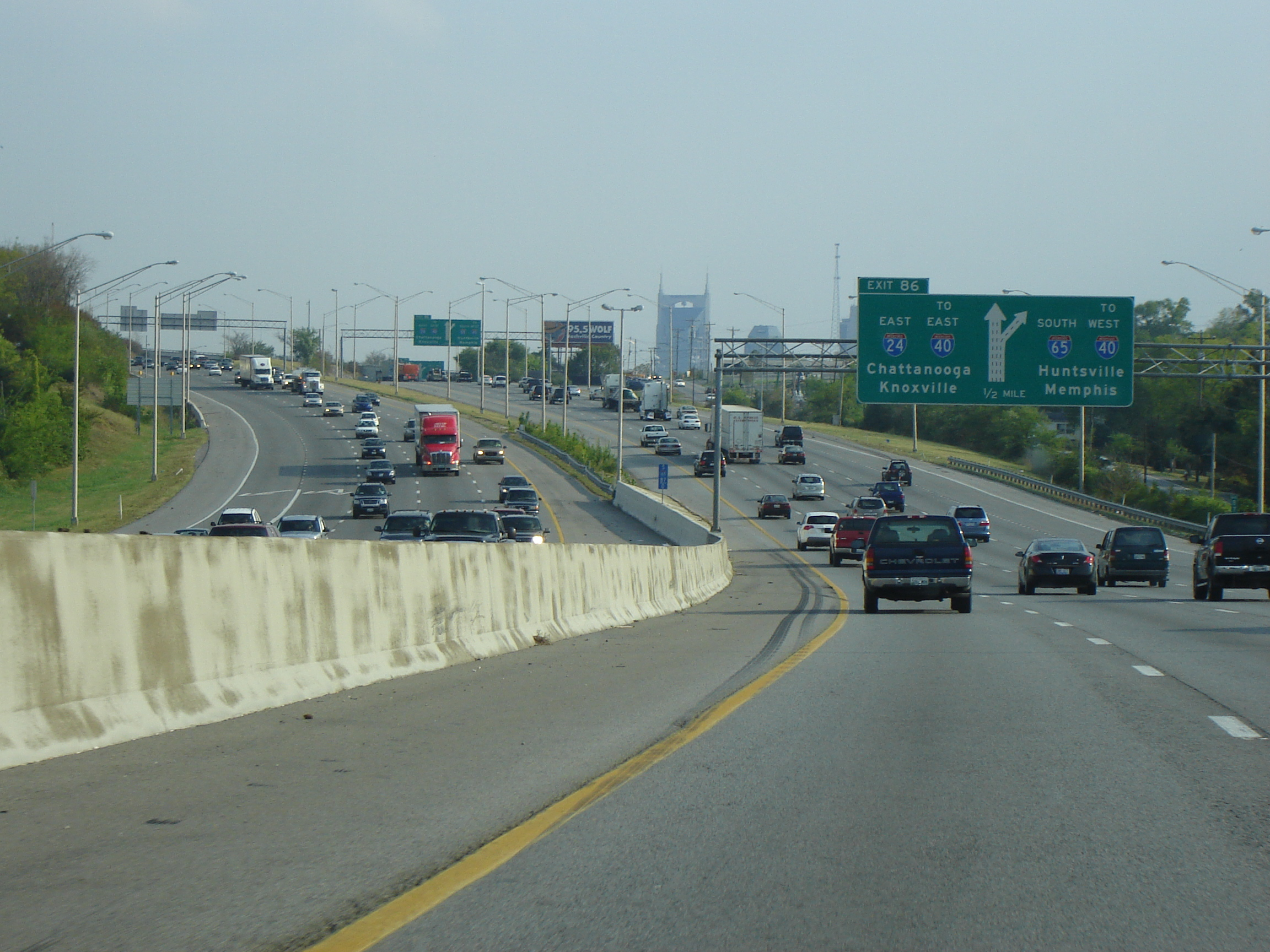
I-65 southbound in Nashville concurrent with I-24

About one mile (1.6 km) later, I-65 crosses the Cumberland River on the Lyle H. Fulton Memorial Bridge and then reaches an interchange with I-24, beginning a concurrency with that route and shifting into a northward direction. Unlike the concurrency with I-40, the I-65 mile and exit numbers are retained. Carrying eight lanes, the combined routes have an interchange with US 431 (Trinity Lane) just beyond. About 1.5 miles (2.4 km) later, I-24 splits off, heading northwest toward Clarksville, while I-65 shifts northeast, carrying a total of 10 through lanes, the left lanes once again functioning as HOV lanes during rush hour. Slightly over one mile (1.6 km) later is a complicated stack interchange with US 31W/US 41 (Dickerson Pike) and SR 155 (Briley Parkway), the latter of which is a freeway that serves as a northern bypass around Nashville. A controlled-access section of US 31E (Ellington Parkway) that parallels I-65 and I-24 south of this interchange is also directly accessible here. The widest section of highway in Tennessee is found on the north side of this interchange, where the road briefly accommodates a total of 15 lanes (eight northbound, seven southbound). The road passes through Madison and has an interchange with SR 45 (Old Hickory Boulevard) about two miles (3.2 km) later. A little over three miles (4.8 km) later, the Interstate reaches an interchange with the western terminus of SR 386 (Vietnam Veterans Boulevard) in Goodlettsville, a freeway spur which serves the Nashville suburbs of Hendersonville and Gallatin. Here, I-65 reduces to six lanes, and the HOV restrictions terminate.

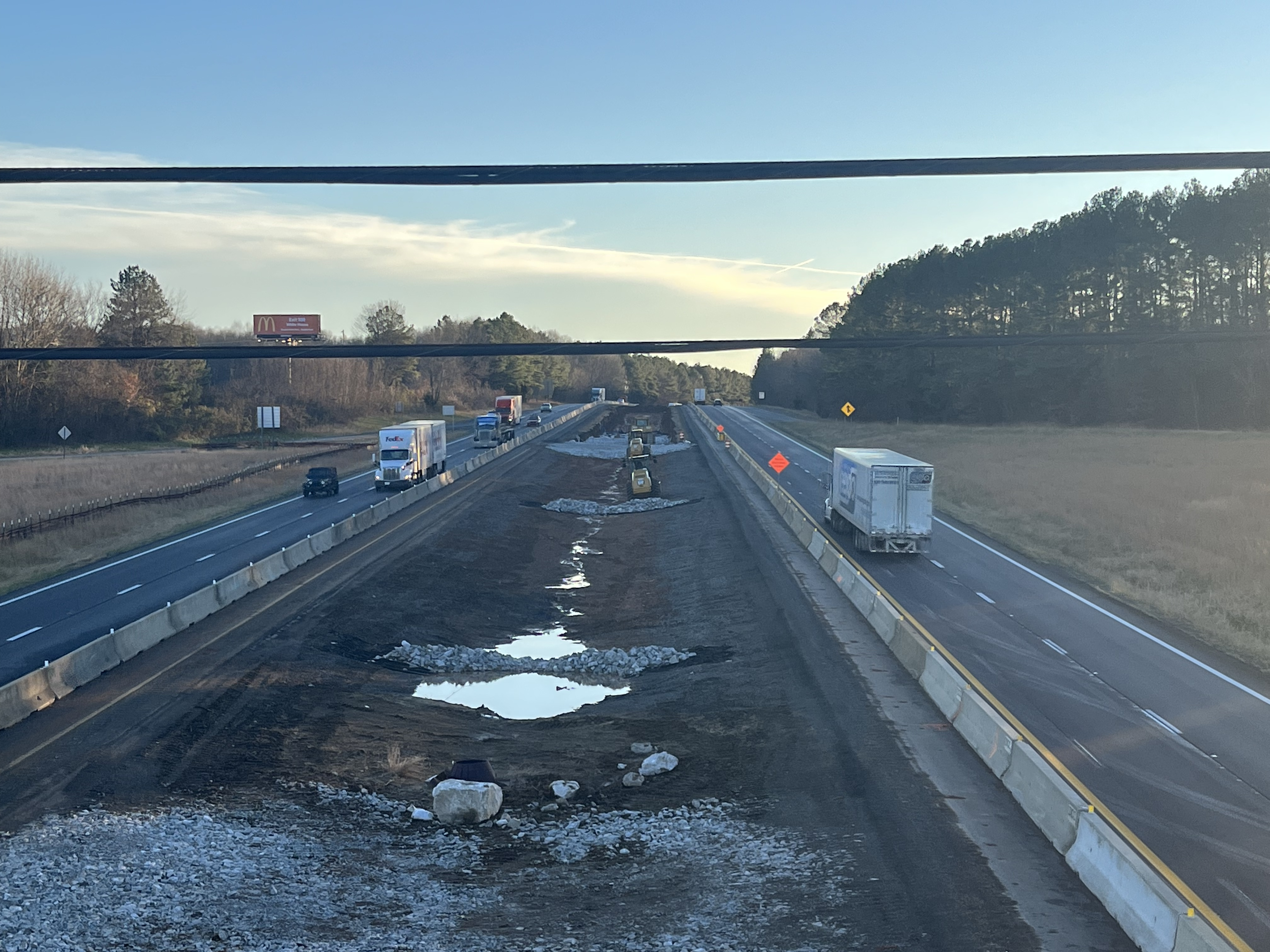
I-65 in Cross Plains, facing south.

Leaving the urban Nashville area, I-65 reduces back to four lanes at SR 174 (Long Hollow Pike) and enters Sumner County. Immediately beyond is an interchange with US 31W near the city of Millersville, where the Interstate begins a temporary ascent, utilizing a truck climbing lane. The freeway then enters a predominantly rural area and a few miles later begins a steep ascent out of the Nashville Basin onto the northern part of the Highland Rim with the northbound lanes utilizing a truck climbing lane over a distance of about two miles (3.2 km). The Interstate crosses into Robertson County at the top of this ascent. Four miles (6.4 km) later is an interchange with SR 76 in White House, which also serves Springfield to the west. Passing through rural terrain characterized mostly by farmland, I-65 expands back to six lanes and reaches an interchange with SR 25 about five miles (8.0 km) later near the town of Cross Plains, which also connects to Springfield and Gallatin. The Interstate crosses the Red River twice in short succession, and, bypassing Portland to the west, reaches an interchange with SR 52. A few miles beyond this point, I-65 reaches an interchange with SR 109 northwest of Portland and then crosses into Kentucky about 1/2 mile (0.80 km) later.

== History ==
=== Predecessor highways ===
When Middle Tennessee was first settled by European Americans in the late 18th century, a series of Native American trails existed within what is now the I-65 corridor. These gradually evolved into stagecoach paths which were used extensively by early settlers and travelers through the region. In 1816, Congress approved the construction of a road between Nashville and New Orleans that also passed through Franklin and Columbia. Completed four years later, the road was named Jackson's Military Road after President Andrew Jackson, who had advocated for its construction during the Creek War. It ran east of the Natchez Trace, another Native American trail used by early settlers. In the 1830s and 1840s, two toll roads were constructed between Nashville and Louisville. These two roads were designated as the Louisville and Nashville Turnpike, also known as the L&N Turnpike, and roughly followed existing Native American trails.

In 1911, Jackson's Military Road and the eastern branch of the L&N Turnpike were designated as part of the Jackson Highway, an auto trail. A branch route running between Nashville and Selma, Alabama, was designated the Alabama-Jackson Highway. A portion of the Dixie Highway, another auto trail, was established along the western branch of the L&N turnpike in 1915. That same year the Tennessee Department of Highways and Public Works, the predecessor agency to TDOT, was established and tasked with establishing a state highway system. In 1923, with the formation of the Tennessee State Route System, the Jackson Highway was designated as part of SR 6, and SR 7 was applied to the road between Ardmore and Columbia. SR 6 was also applied to the eastern branch of the L&N Turnpike, with the western branch designated as part of SR 11 and 75. When the United States Numbered Highway System was established by Congress in 1926, SR 6 and 7 between Nashville and Alabama were designated as part of US 31, and the L&N Turnpike was designated as US 31E and 31W.

=== Planning and construction ===
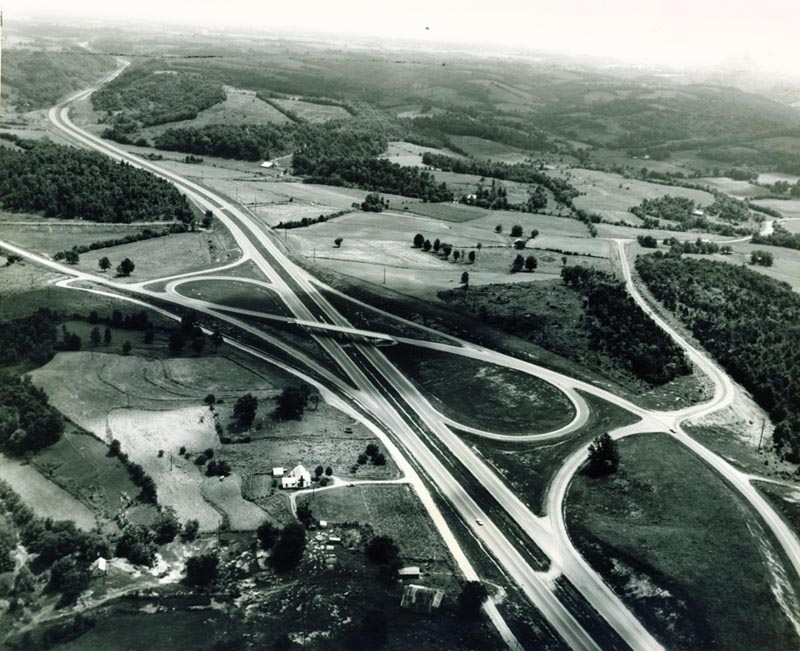
I-65 near the Alabama state line was the first stretch of Interstate Highway in Tennessee, opened on November 15, 1958.

The general alignment for the freeway that became I-65 was included in the National Interregional Highway Committee's 1944 report, titled Interregional Highways, and a subsequent 1947 plan produced by the Public Roads Administration of the now-defunct Federal Works Agency. The freeway was reportedly originally planned to pass west of Franklin until 1955, when it was moved to the east to provide a better link to Nashville. This alignment was affirmed in a map produced by the Bureau of Public Roads, the predecessor agency to the Federal Highway Administration, in September of that year, and I-65 was part of 1,047.6 miles (1,685.9 km) of Interstate Highways allocated to Tennessee by the Federal-Aid Highway Act of 1956, commonly known as the Interstate Highway Act. The numbering was subsequently approved by the American Association of State Highway Officials on August 14, 1957. A planned interchange with US 431 in southern Williamson County was moved 4 miles (6.4 km) north to SR 248 (Peytonsville Road/Goose Creek Bypass) in October 1960 at the urging of the state highway department. Critics charged that this was done to financially benefit then-Governor Buford Ellington, who was investing in adjacent land at the time. Both Ellington and the state denied these allegations, claiming the decision was made after the location was determined to be more suitable to relieve congestion in downtown Franklin.

The southernmost 1.8 miles (2.9 km) of I-65 was the first section of Interstate Highway in Tennessee to begin construction and open to traffic after the passage of the Federal-Aid Highway Act. (Note: While TDOT refers to this section as the first section of Interstate Highway in Tennessee, three sections—a short freeway in Knoxville that is now part of I-40, a short four-lane divided highway near Chattanooga that is now part of I-75, and the Memphis & Arkansas Bridge in Memphis—were constructed prior and later integrated into the Interstate Highway System.) Work began on this stretch on May 23, 1957, and it was dedicated and opened to traffic on November 15, 1958. Contractor McDowell and McDowell Construction built this stretch, including the figure-eight interchange with US 31 and SR 7, at a cost of $1.3 million (equivalent to $11.1 million in 2025). The next section to be constructed was the original alignment of I-65 in Nashville concurrent with I-24, stretching from the western I-24/I-40 interchange to US 41 (First Street). This section includes the Silliman Evans Bridge over the Cumberland River, which began construction in late April 1960, and was partially opened in late December 1963. Contracts for the remainder of this stretch were awarded between February and September 1961, and the entire stretch was opened on January 14, 1964, with a dedication ceremony on the bridge officiated by then-Governor Frank G. Clement and then-Nashville Mayor Beverly Briley.

The 19.4-mile (31.2 km) section between US 412/SR 99 in Columbia and SR 96 in Franklin was contracted in four smaller segments between December 1960 and August 1961, and completed in November 1964. On July 27, 1965, the 1.2-mile (1.9 km) Nashville section between US 41 (First Street) and US 431 (Trinity Lane) was opened; this section included provisions for the present-day southern exchange with I-24, which had not been constructed yet. The section between US 31/SR 7 and US 64 in Giles County was awarded in two separate sections in April 1961 and March 1963, and completed on December 1, 1965. The stretch between SR 96 in Franklin and SR 254 (Old Hickory Boulevard) in south Nashville was let in two separate segments in September 1961 and August 1963, and was completed on December 17, 1965. The contract for the 13.5-mile (21.7 km) section between SR 373 (then SR 50A) and US 412/SR 99 was awarded in August 1963, and the section opened to traffic on December 20, 1966. The section between US 64 and US 31A was awarded in December 1963, and completed by the end of 1966. In Nashville, the section between SR 254 and SR 255 (Harding Place) was awarded in April 1964 and completed by February 1967. The last segment between the Alabama state line and Nashville, 9.7 miles (15.6 km) between US 31A near Cornersville and SR 373, was let to contract on September 11, 1964, and opened on November 22, 1967. This was the second major stretch of Interstate Highway to be completed in Tennessee, after I-40 between Memphis and Nashville, completed the previous year.

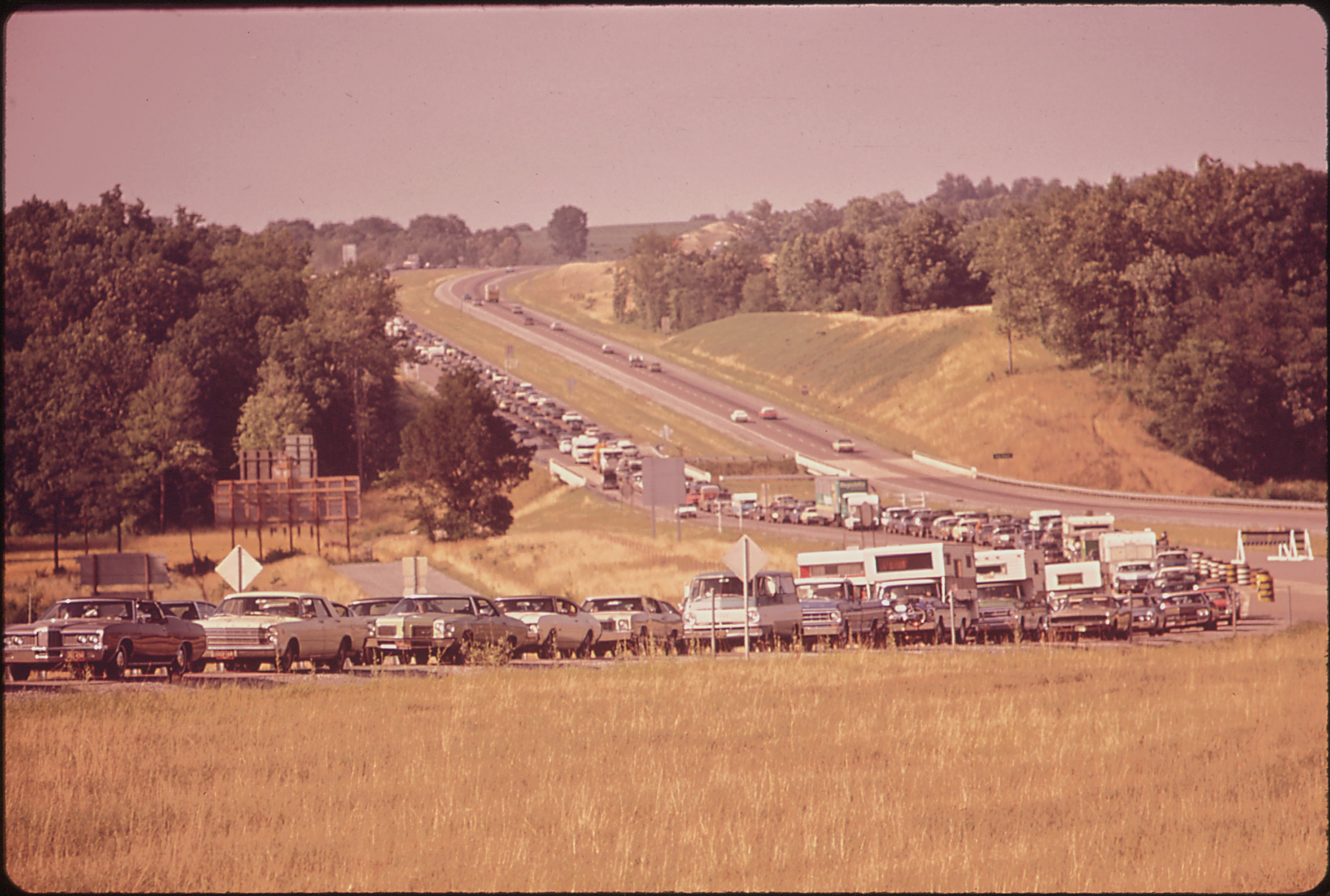
I-65 at the SR 25 interchange in September 1972, looking north. The section south of this interchange was completed three months later.

Contracts for the construction of I-65 from north of downtown Nashville to Goodlettsville were let in June 1966, and the 2.5-mile (4.0 km) section between US 431 (Trinity Lane) and US 41 (Dickerson Pike) in north Nashville was opened to traffic on December 23, 1968. The adjacent 9-mile (14 km) section extending north to US 31W in Millersville opened on October 10, 1969. On June 22, 1970, the 8.8-mile (14.2 km) section between SR 25 near Cross Plains and the Kentucky state line, along with the southernmost 2.5 miles (4.0 km) in Kentucky, was opened. Work on the Lyle H. Fulton Memorial Bridge across the Cumberland River in Nashville began in June 1967, and the section between I-40 and I-24, which was then I-265, opened on March 15, 1971, along with the adjacent stretch of I-40 to the west. Work on the section in Nashville concurrent with I-40, along with the original alignment concurrent with that route, began in May 1969 and was dedicated and opened on March 3, 1972. The two-mile (3.2 km) segment between Berry Road, near the present location of the I-440 interchange, and the split with I-40 south of downtown Nashville was opened on October 25, 1972. The 14-mile (23 km) segment between US 31W in Millersville and SR 25 near Cross Plains was let to contract in April 1970, and dedicated and opened by then-Governor Winfield Dunn on December 15, 1972. The final section of I-65 completed in Tennessee was the approximately 2.5-mile (4.0 km) section between SR 255 and Berry Road, which was dedicated and opened to traffic by Governor Dunn and Mayor Briley on October 26, 1973.

=== Nashville and suburban projects ===
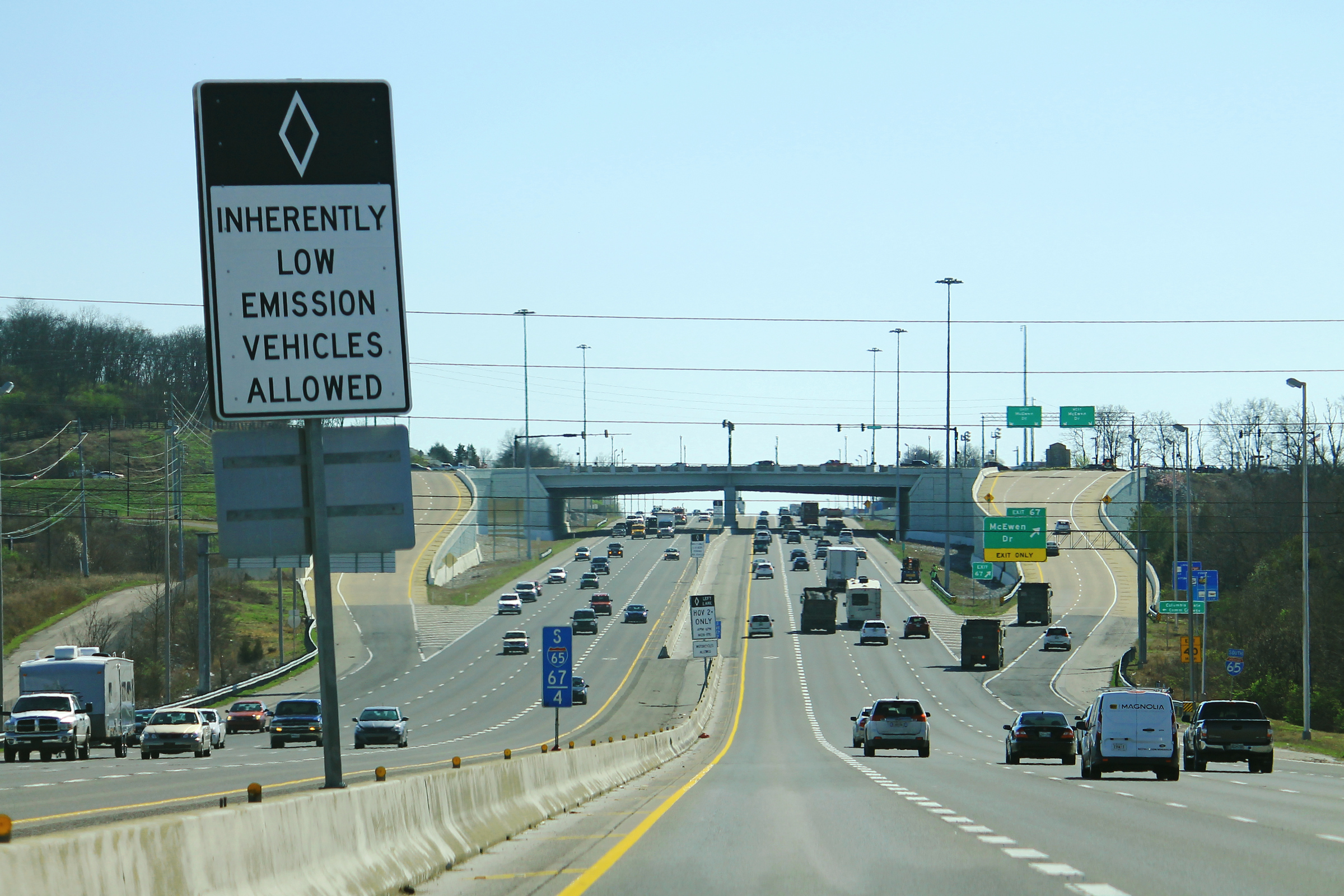
The southbound HOV lane on I-65 in Franklin

The stretch between SR 255 and I-440 was widened from six to eight lanes between August 1985 and November 1987 in a project that also involved the construction of a new interchange with Armory Drive. The 9.7-mile (15.6 km) section between US 431 (Trinity Lane) in Nashville and SR 174 in Goodlettsville was widened to six lanes between December 1987 and November 1989. The first HOV lanes in Tennessee opened on September 10, 1993, on the approximately eight-mile (13 km) section of I-65 between SR 255 in south Nashville and south of SR 253 in Brentwood with the completion of a project, begun on March 19, 1992, that widened that segment from four to eight lanes. Widening of the adjacent seven-mile (11 km) segment extending south to SR 96 in Franklin from two to four lanes in each direction began in May 1996 and was completed in September 1997. Between September 1997 and December 1998, the concurrent section with I-24 through the cloverleaf interchange with US 431 was widened from six to eight lanes in a project that also converted this interchange into a partial cloverleaf interchange. The section between SR 255 and I-440 was expanded to five lanes in each direction between April 1998 and March 2000 as part of a project that also expanded the interchange with SR 255.

In an effort to reduce congestion on the Inner Loop in Nashville, I-65 was rerouted from the eastern to the western leg, eliminating I-265. Traffic studies had shown higher volumes and congestion on the eastern leg, and this action was undertaken to mitigate this problem and divert through traffic on I-65 onto the less-traveled route. In addition, the local government had advocated for the designation to be changed in order to help alleviate congestion caused by motorists following I-65 through the city. This reroute moved the concurrency with I-40 to the west, and significantly shortened the I-24 concurrency. The change was announced on May 1, 2000, and the new designation officially went into effect on October 1 of that year, with new signage complete by the end of that month. As a result of this change, I-65 was lengthened by approximately 0.8 miles (1.3 km), but mile markers and exit numbers north of this realignment were not renumbered.

I-65 in northern Nashville was reconstructed and widened in three phases. The first phase, which began in early 2001, reconstructed and widened the segment between US 41 (Dickerson Pike) and SR 45 from three to five lanes in each direction and improved the interchange with SR 155 (Briley Parkway), adding new flyover bridges and straightening ramps. It was completed in early 2005, more than a year behind schedule. The second phase, which began in early 2002, widened the section between SR 45 and SR 386 near Goodlettsville from three to five lanes in each direction. It was completed in early 2006, which was also more than a year behind schedule. The final phase widened the section between US 431 through the split with I-24 and US 41. It began in October 2012 and was completed in May 2016 after multiple delays. In 2005, a project to widen the six miles (9.7 km) of I-65 from four to eight lanes between SR 96 and I-840 was moved from low to high priority upon the urging of local legislators and the city of Franklin. This project was accomplished in two phases. The first, which began in November 2010 and was completed in April 2013, widened the two-mile (3.2 km) section south of SR 96. The second phase, which began on October 20, 2013, also included reconstruction of the interchange with SR 248, which widened the route and lengthened the ramps. On August 15, 2014, a gasoline tanker truck crashed into the partially-rebuilt SR 248 overpass and exploded, killing the driver and necessitating the replacement of this bridge. Despite this setback, the project was completed and dedicated on schedule on June 15, 2016.

=== Outer suburban and exurban widening projects ===
Although the area along I-65 north of Nashville has not grown as fast as the suburbs to the south, this stretch of highway is part of a major north–south freight corridor between Atlanta and Chicago, and in addition to trucks, also receives a large volume of tourist traffic. As Kentucky widened their rural stretches of I-65 in the 2000s and 2010s, TDOT began to receive criticism for not widening their adjacent stretch to the south. As part of a project to construct a new interchange with an extension of the northern terminus of SR 109, the northernmost one mile (1.6 km) of I-65 in Tennessee was widened to six lanes. The interchange opened on November 27, 2019, and final work was completed in the spring of 2020. Preliminary engineering for the remaining 23-mile (37 km) segment, which extends to SR 174 in Goodlettsville, first received funding under the IMPROVE Act, passed by the Tennessee General Assembly in 2017. This legislation increased the state's fuel taxes and vehicle registration fees for the purpose of funding a backlog of 962 needed transportation projects. This stretch will be widened in four separate phases.

The first phase, which began on September 30, 2021, widened the approximately 9.7-mile (15.6 km) segment between south of SR 25 and south of SR 109, and converted a northbound weigh station into a truck parking area. At a cost of $160 million, this project was the most expensive individual contract ever awarded by TDOT at the time. In 2022, more than 340 crashes occurred along this stretch, making it the most dangerous work zone in the state. In response, TDOT implemented additional safety measures along this stretch in May 2023, including stationing additional state troopers, installing additional warning signs and radar speed signs, and a reduction of the speed limit from 60 to 55 miles per hour (97 to 89 km/h). Construction on this phase was completed on September 19, 2024. The next phase, which began on March 28, 2025, widens the four-lane section between SR 174 and US 31W, constructs auxiliary lanes on the six-lane section between Rivergate Parkway and SR 174, and reconstructs the US 31 interchange into a diverging diamond interchange. Completion is expected by November 30, 2027.

Since the completion of the widening of I-65 to I-840, the continued rapid growth of southern Williamson County and Maury County has resulted in congestion hotspots developing on the six-mile (9.7 km) four-lane section extending from I-840 to SR 396. This problem has been particularly exacerbated by the rapid growth of Spring Hill, which expanded from approximately 1,500 residents in 1990 to a population of 50,000 in 2020, and consistently ranks as one of the fastest growing cities in the United States. Despite the IMPROVE Act in 2017, and additional legislation in 2023 and 2025 providing increased transportation funding, TDOT had no plans to widen this section of I-65. This decision received significant criticism, particularly from residents and government officials who live along this corridor. In April and May of 2025, the Williamson and Maury County commissions and the city of Spring Hill passed a joint resolution asking TDOT to widen the 13-mile (21 km) section between US 412/SR 99 and I-840, with prioritization of the section between SR 396 and I-840. In April 2026, TDOT updated their ten-year project plan to include a widening project on the latter section, which is tentatively scheduled to start in 2028.

== Honorary designations and commemorations ==
The Lyle H. Fulton Memorial Bridge in Nashville is named for a political candidate from Nashville who received the Democratic nomination for a seat in the Tennessee Senate in 1954, but died of cancer before the general election. Fulton's brother Richard, who later became Mayor of Nashville, was subsequently seated in his place. The bridge was dedicated in honor of Fulton on July 9, 1971. In addition, a number of short sections, interchanges, and bridges along the Interstate are named in honor of state troopers and other law enforcement personnel killed in the line of duty, as well as local politicians and other prominent citizens.

In November 1998, the state commemorated the 40th anniversary of the completion of the first stretch of I-65 in Tennessee. On June 29, 2006, a historical marker celebrating the opening of this section as the first section of Interstate Highway in Tennessee was dedicated at the northbound Tennessee Welcome Center near Ardmore as part of a statewide observance of the 50th anniversary of the establishment of the Interstate Highway System. As part of the celebration, TDOT also produced a postcard with an aerial photograph of this section taken around the time of its completion.

== Exit list ==
County	Location	mi (Note: Mileposts on I-65 are numbered according to the original routing prior to 2000, which is approximately 0.8 miles (1.3 km) shorter than current alignment. As a result, mileposts and exits are offset between the I-24 concurrency and the Kentucky state line.)	km	Exit	Destinations	Notes
Giles	Ardmore	0.00	0.00		I-65 south / US 31 south – Huntsville	Continuation into Alabama
Giles	Ardmore	1.48	2.38	1	US 31 / SR 7 (Elkton Highway) – Ardmore, Pulaski, Lawrenceburg, Huntsville	Northern end of US 31 concurrency
Giles	Elkton	6.23	10.03	6	SR 273 (Bryson Road) – Elkton	
Giles	Frankewing	14.14	22.76	14	US 64 (SR 15) – Pulaski, Fayetteville	
Giles–Marshall county line		22.52	36.24	22	US 31A (SR 11) – Lewisburg, Cornersville, Pulaski	
Marshall		27.21	43.79	27	SR 129 (Lynnville Road) – Lynnville, Cornersville	
Marshall	Lewisburg	32.66	52.56	32	SR 373 (Mooresville Highway) – Lewisburg	
Maury	Columbia	37.54	60.41	37	SR 50 (New Lewisburg Highway) – Columbia	
Maury	Columbia	46.24	74.42	46	US 412 west / SR 99 – Columbia, Chapel Hill	Eastern terminus of US 412
Williamson	Spring Hill	53.18	85.58	53	SR 396 west (Saturn Parkway) – Spring Hill	Eastern terminus of SR 396; trumpet interchange; opened on August 7, 1989
Williamson	Spring Hill	55.59	89.46	55	June Lake Boulevard	Diverging diamond interchange; opened on May 31, 2024
Williamson	Franklin	59.15	95.19	59	I-840 – Memphis, Dickson, Knoxville, Murfreesboro	I-840 exit 31; signed as exits 59A (east) and 59B (west); combination interchange; former SR 840; opened on October 18, 2001
Williamson	Franklin	61.81	99.47	61	SR 248 west (Goose Creek Bypass) / Peytonsville Road	Eastern terminus of SR 248
Williamson	Franklin	65.64	105.64	65	SR 96 (Murfreesboro Road) – Franklin	
Williamson	Franklin	67.05	107.91	67	McEwen Drive	Opened on September 14, 2007
Williamson	Franklin	68.01	109.45	68	Cool Springs Boulevard	Signed as exits 68A (east) and 68B (west)
Williamson	Brentwood	69.34	111.59	69	SR 441 (Moores Lane)	Southbound exit to Galleria Boulevard
Williamson	Brentwood	71.60	115.23	71	SR 253 (Concord Road) – Brentwood	Opened on November 18, 1988
Davidson	Nashville–Oak Hill line	74.73	120.27	74	SR 254 (Old Hickory Boulevard) – Brentwood	Signed as exits 74A (east) and 74B (west)
Davidson	Nashville–Oak Hill line	78.01	125.54	78	SR 255 (Harding Place)	Signed southbound as exits 78A (east) and 78B (west)
Davidson	Nashville–Oak Hill line	79.33	127.67	79	Armory Drive	Trumpet interchange; opened on November 6, 1987
Davidson	Nashville–Berry Hill line	80.45	129.47	80	I-440 – Memphis, Knoxville	One of two four-level stack interchanges in Tennessee; I-440 exit 5; access to Nashville International Airport
Davidson	Nashville	81.75	131.56	81	Wedgewood Avenue	
Davidson	Nashville	82.75	133.17	82B	I-40 east to I-24 east – Knoxville, Chattanooga	Southern end of I-40 concurrency; left exit and entrance southbound; I-40 exit 210; access to Nashville International Airport
Davidson	Nashville	83.43	134.27	209B	US 70S / US 431 (Broadway/SR 1) / Demonbreun Street	Exit numbers follow I-40; northbound signed as "Demonbreun St." only
Davidson	Nashville	83.59– 83.78	134.53– 134.83	209A	US 70 / US 70S / US 431 (Broadway/SR 1/SR 24)	Signed as "Church Street" southbound
Davidson	Nashville	84.01	135.20	209	US 70 (Charlotte Avenue/SR 24) / Church Street	Church St. not signed southbound
Davidson	Nashville	84.93	136.68	84B	I-40 west – Memphis	Northern end of I-40 overlap; left entrance northbound, left exits; I-40 exit 208
Davidson	Nashville	85.77	138.03	85	US 41A (Rosa L. Parks Boulevard/SR 12) – State Capitol	
Davidson	Nashville			Lyle H. Fulton Memorial Bridge over the Cumberland River		
Davidson	Nashville	87.21	140.35	86	I-24 east to I-40 east – Chattanooga, Knoxville	Southern end of I-24 concurrency; left exit and entrance southbound; signed as exit 86B northbound; I-24 west exit 46B
Davidson	Nashville	88.10	141.78	87	US 431 (Trinity Lane/SR 65)	
Davidson	Nashville	89.28	143.68	88	I-24 west – Clarksville	Northern end of I-24 concurrency; left exit and entrance northbound; I-24 east exit 44B
Davidson	Nashville	90.71– 91.11	145.98– 146.63	90	US 31W / US 41 (Dickerson Pike/SR 11) / SR 155 (Briley Parkway) / US 31E south (Ellington Parkway) – Opryland	Split into exits 90A (SR 155 west/US 31W/US 41) and 90B (SR 155 east); US 31E not signed northbound, access via exit 90A south; exit 90B provides access to Nashville International Airport
Davidson	Nashville	93.03	149.72	92	SR 45 (Old Hickory Boulevard) – Madison	
Davidson	Goodlettsville	96.32	155.01	95	SR 386 east (Vietnam Veterans Boulevard) – Hendersonville, Gallatin	Western terminus of SR 386; northbound exit and southbound entrance; opened on October 4, 1990
Davidson	Goodlettsville	96.69	155.61	96	Rivergate Parkway – Goodlettsville, Hendersonville	
Davidson	Goodlettsville	97.82	157.43	97	SR 174 (Long Hollow Pike) – Goodlettsville, Gallatin	Opened on June 3, 1980
Sumner	Goodlettsville	99.57	160.24	98	US 31W (SR 41) – Millersville, Springfield, Goodlettsville	
Robertson	Millersville	104.72	168.53	104	SR 257 (Bethel Road) – Ridgetop	
Robertson	White House	108.79	175.08	108	SR 76 – Springfield, White House	
Robertson	Cross Plains	113.47	182.61	112	SR 25 (Main Street) – Cross Plains, Springfield, Gallatin	
Robertson	Orlinda	118.49	190.69	117	SR 52 (Maple Street) – Portland, Orlinda	
Robertson		121.71	195.87	121	SR 109 south (Vaughn Parkway) – Portland, Welcome Center	Southbound collector-distributor lane provides access to and from interchange and Welcome Center, and begins in Kentucky; opened on November 27, 2019
Robertson		122.27	196.77		I-65 north – Louisville	Continuation into Kentucky
1.000 mi = 1.609 km; 1.000 km = 0.621 mi: Concurrency terminus; Incomplete access; Unopened

== Special route ==
Interstate 65 Alternate
- Location: Robertson and Sumner counties
- Length: 14.34 mi (23.08 km)
- Existed: 2023–present

Interstate 65 Alternate is an alternate route of I-65 running through Robertson and Sumner counties. It was formed to divert traffic from the widening project between Nashville and the Kentucky state line. It mostly runs along US 31W. Signs were first posted in early February 2023, with additional signs installed in March.

Major intersections

County	Location	mi	km	Destinations	Notes
Robertson	White House	0.00	0.00	I-65 / SR 76 west – Louisville, Nashville, Springfield	Southern end of SR 76 concurrency; I-65 exit 108; southern terminus
Robertson	White House	0.96	1.54	SR 258 south (Raymond Hirsch Parkway) – Hendersonville	
Robertson	White House	1.63	2.62	US 31W south – Millersville	Southern terminus of US 31W concurrency
Sumner–Robertson county line	White House	1.79	2.88	SR 76 east – Portland	Northern terminus of SR 76 concurrency
Sumner–Robertson county line	Cross Plains	5.88	9.46	SR 25 to I-65 – Springfield, Gallatin	
Sumner–Robertson county line	Portland	10.92	17.57	SR 52 (College Street) to I-65 – Orlinda, Portland	
Sumner–Robertson county line	Portland	13.84	22.27	SR 109 (Vaughn Parkway) to I-65 – Portland	
Sumner–Robertson county line	Portland	14.33	23.06	SR 259 east (Main Street) – Mitchellville	
Sumner–Robertson county line	Portland	14.34	23.08	US 31W north (Nashville Road) to I-65 – Franklin	Northern end of US 31W concurrency; northern terminus; Kentucky state line
1.000 mi = 1.609 km; 1.000 km = 0.621 mi: Concurrency terminus

== Notes ==
Interstate 65
Previous state: Alabama	Tennessee	Next state: Kentucky
