= Lyle H. Fulton Memorial Bridge =

Highway bridge in Nashville, Tennessee, United States

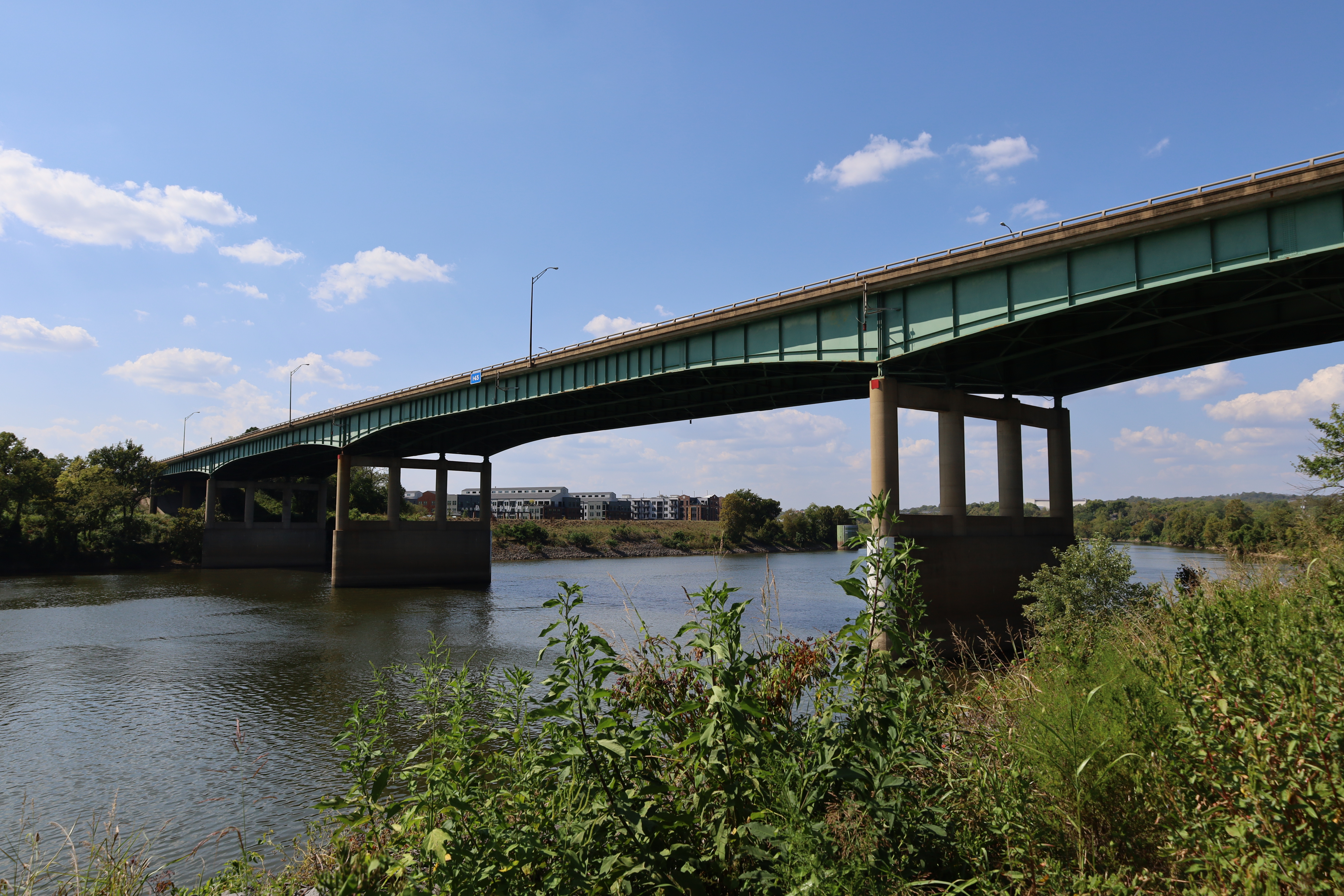
- The bridge in 2025
- Coordinates: 36.1918°N 86.7831°W
- Carries: 6 lanes of I-65
- Crosses: Cumberland River
- Locale: Nashville, Tennessee

Characteristics
- Design: Plate girder bridge
- Total length: 994 ft (303 m)
- Width: 90 feet (27 m)

History
- Construction start: June 1967
- Construction end: March 15, 1971

Statistics
- Daily traffic: 102,343 (2025)

Location
- Interactive map of Lyle H. Fulton Memorial Bridge

The Lyle H. Fulton Memorial Bridge is a steel plate girder bridge in Nashville, Tennessee that carries Interstate 65 across the Cumberland River. Between the bridge's completion in 1971 and 2000, the route that the bridge carries was designated as Interstate 265, until I-65 was rerouted onto the bridge, replacing that route.

== Description ==
The Lyle H. Fulton Memorial Bridge carries I-65 across the Cumberland River about 2 miles (3.2 km) north of downtown Nashville. The segment of I-65 that the bridge is located on is part of a loop of Interstate Highways that completely encircle downtown Nashville, known locally as the Downtown Loop or Inner Loop. The bridge carries six lanes, separated by a jersey barrier, and has no shoulders, unlike the nearby Silliman Evans Bridge on I-24. Directly east of the bridge I-65 splits off into a concurrency with I-24, with the lanes on I-65 splitting off into this interchange less than 200 feet (61 m) beyond the eastern end of the bridge. While I-65 is a north-south route, the bridge is almost directly aligned in an east-to-west direction. West of the bridge, I-65 gradually curves to the south. In addition to the Cumberland River, the bridge also crosses the Cumberland River Greenway at its western end and a surface street at its eastern end.

== History ==
Work began on the bridge in June 1967. This was essentially completed in 1969, but the bridge could not open until the adjacent stretch of Interstate to the west was completed. On March 15, 1971 the bridge was opened to traffic, along with the entirety of I-265 to the southwest and a short segment of I-40 west of downtown Nashville. Construction of the bridge cost $2,645,508 (equivalent to $15.7 million in 2024). The bridge was officially dedicated on July 9, 1971 in a ceremony officiated by then-governor Winfield Dunn which partially closed the bridge to traffic. It was named in honor of a state politician who died in 1954 from liver cancer at the age of 31 shortly after receiving the Democratic nomination for state senate. As a result, his brother Richard was elected in his place.

In an effort to relieve traffic congestion on I-24 east of downtown Nashville, I-65 was rerouted from a concurrency with that route to the western freeway loop around downtown Nashville in May 2000, replacing I-265.
