= Beech Hill, Tennessee =

Beech Hill, Tennessee may refer to:

- Beech Hill, Franklin County, Tennessee
- Beech Hill, Giles County, Tennessee
- Beech Hill, Macon County, Tennessee
