= Frankewing, Tennessee =

- Unincorporated community
- Location within Tennessee Location within the United States
- Coordinates: 35°11′33″N 86°51′04″W
- Country: United States
- State: Tennessee
- County: Giles

Area
  - Total: 0.94 sq mi (2.44 km^{2})
  - Land: 0.94 sq mi (2.44 km^{2})
  - Water: 0 sq mi (0.00 km^{2})
- Elevation: 673 ft (205 m)

Population (2020)
  - Total: 124
  - Density: 131.5/sq mi (50.78/km^{2})
- Time zone: UTC-6 (Central (CST))
  - Summer (DST): UTC-5 (CDT)
- ZIP code: 38459
- Area code: 931
- GNIS feature ID: 1284814

Frankewing is an unincorporated community in Giles County, Tennessee, United States. It is named for Frank Ewing who used his influence with state legislators to secure rail service to the area. A depot was built. It has a post office, with a ZIP code of 38459. It is located 1 mile east of the interchange between Interstate 65 (I-65, exit 14) and U.S. Route 64 (US 64). There is a Bank of Frankewing. Bradshaw Creek flows through the area.

== Demographics ==
Historical population
Census	Pop.	Note	%±
2020	124		—
U.S. Decennial Census
