= Interstate 265 (Tennessee) =

Former Interstate Highway in Nashville, Tennessee, United States

Interstate 265
- I-265 highlighted in red

Route information
- Auxiliary route of I-65
- Maintained by TDOT
- Length: 2.25 mi (3.62 km)
- Existed: 1965–April 7, 2000
- NHS: Entire route

Major junctions
- South end: I-40 in Nashville
- US 41A in Nashville
- North end: I-24 / I-65 in Nashville

Location
- Country: United States
- State: Tennessee

Highway system
- Interstate Highway System; Main; Auxiliary; Suffixed; Business; Future; Tennessee State Routes; Interstate; US; State
← SR 265	→ SR 266

Interstate 265 (I-265) was an auxiliary Interstate Highway in Nashville, Tennessee. It ran on the northern part of the Nashville downtown loop from 1965 to April 7, 2000. It was replaced by a reroute of its parent highway, I-65. It ran for only 2.25 miles (3.62 km).

== Route description ==
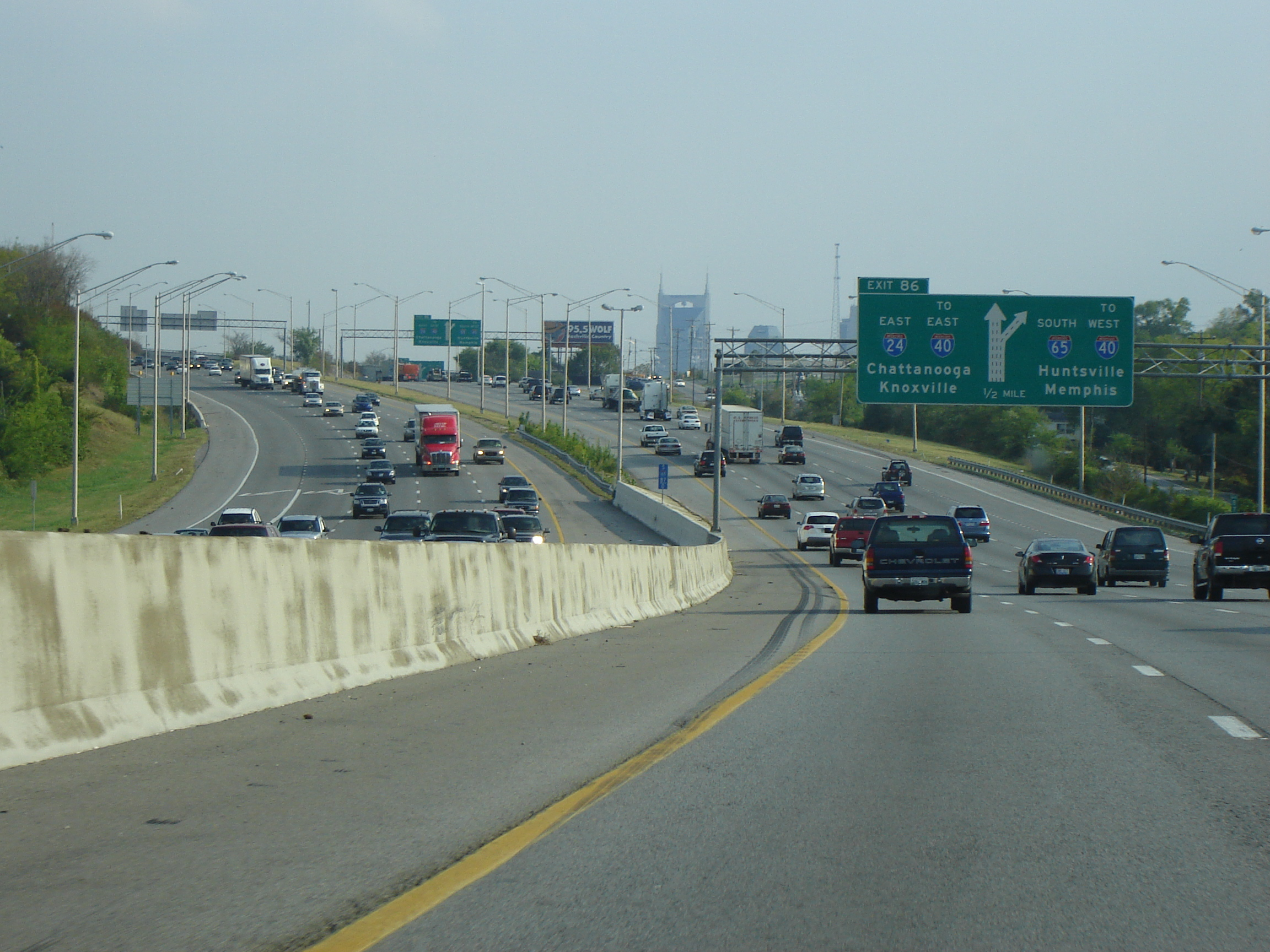
Former exit to I-265

The highway started at the western end of the I-40 portion of the downtown loop, at I-40 exit 208. It went north and intersected U.S. Route 41A (US 41A; Rosa L. Parks Boulevard [then-called 8th Avenue North, and later MetroCenter Boulevard]), which was the only exit. It then crossed the Cumberland River on the Lyle H. Fulton Memorial Bridge and ended at an interchange with I-65 and I-24.

== History ==
I-265 opened to traffic on March 15, 1971. It formed a route between I-65 and I-40 and consisted of the northwest portion of the downtown loop. The auxiliary route contributed to traffic problems on the loop as many drivers preferred to remain on I-65, which ran concurrently with I-24 on the eastern side of the loop, over the auxiliary I-265. In 2000, the designation was eliminated as I-65 was rerouted on the northwest and southwest parts of the downtown loop in an attempt to address traffic issues.

== Exit list ==
The entire route was in Nashville, Davidson County.

mi	km	Exit	Destinations	Notes
0.00	0.00		I-24 / I-65 – Clarksville, Louisville	Northern terminus
1	1.6	1	US 41A (Rosa L. Parks Boulevard) / SR 12 – Clarksville	
2.25	3.62	-	I-40 – Memphis, Knoxville	Southern terminus
1.000 mi = 1.609 km; 1.000 km = 0.621 mi
