= Olivette =

Olivette may refer to:

- Olivette, Missouri
- Olivette (opera)
- Olivette (grape), another name for the French wine grape Poulsard

== People ==
- Olivette Bice (born 1968), Vanuatuan sprinter
- Olivette Miller (1914–2003), American musician
- Olivette Otele (born 1970), historian at Bristol University
- Olivette Thibault (1914–1995), Canadian stage, film and television actress
- Nina Olivette (1910–1993), American actress and dancer

== See also ==
- Olivet (disambiguation)
