= Goodspring, Tennessee =

- Unincorporated community
- Location within Tennessee Location within the United States
- Coordinates: 35°08′36″N 87°06′05″W
- Country: United States
- State: Tennessee
- County: Giles
- Elevation: 830 ft (250 m)
- Time zone: UTC-6 (Central (CST))
  - Summer (DST): UTC-5 (CDT)
- ZIP code: 38460
- Area code: 931
- GNIS feature ID: 1285655

Goodspring is an unincorporated community in Giles County, Tennessee, United States. Its ZIP code is 38460.
