= Aspen Hill, Tennessee =

Unincorporated community in Tennessee, US

Coordinates: 35°06′02″N 87°00′14″W

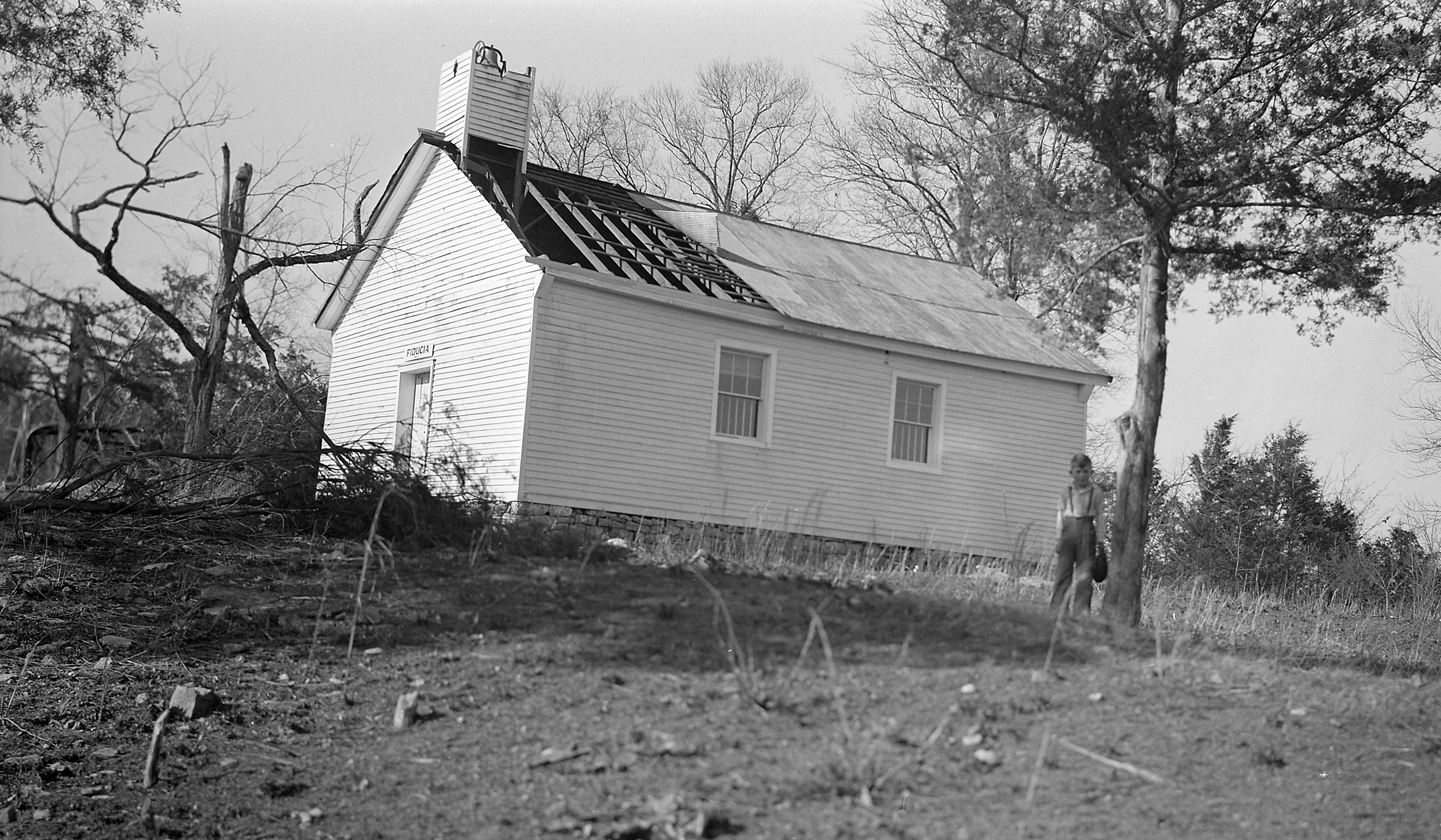
Fiducia Church, after wind damaged it, and a local boy, 1939

Aspen Hill (also, Aspenhill) is an unincorporated community in Giles County, Tennessee, United States. It lies at an elevation of 653 feet (199 m).

== History ==
A post office called Aspen Hill was established in 1860, and remained in operation until it was discontinued in 1952. The community was named from the presence of aspen trees in the area.
