= Berea, Giles County, Tennessee =

Unincorporated community in Tennessee, US

Coordinates: 35°15′30″N 86°58′06″W

Berea is an unincorporated community in Giles County, in the U.S. state of Tennessee.

== History ==
The community was named after the biblical place of Berea.
