= Giles County, Tennessee =

County in Tennessee, United States

- County
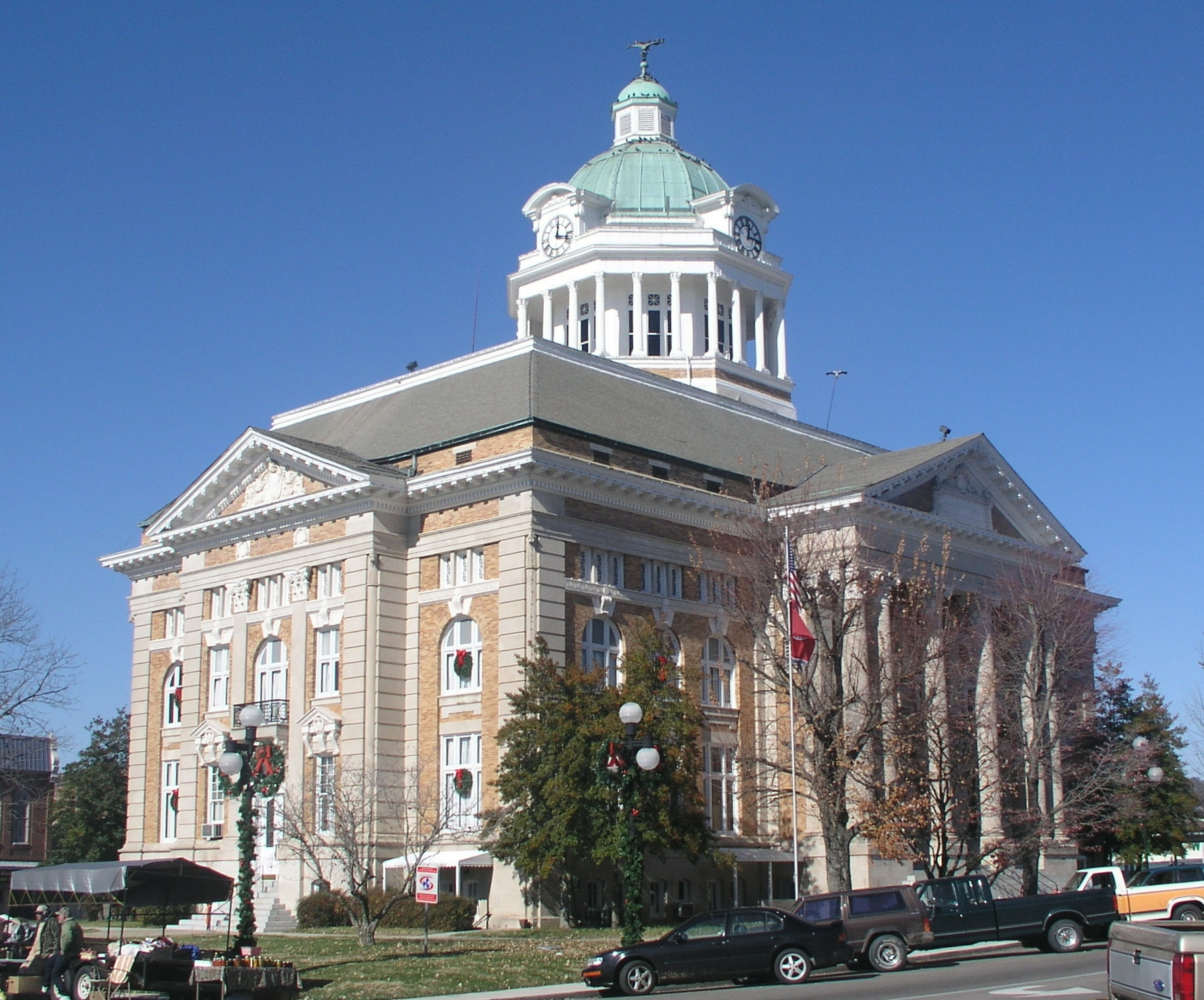
- Giles County Courthouse in Pulaski

- Flag Seal

- Location within the U.S. state of Tennessee
- Coordinates: 35°12′N 87°02′W
- Country: United States
- State: Tennessee
- Founded: November 14, 1809
- Named for: William B. Giles
- Seat: Pulaski
- Largest city: Pulaski

Area
  - Total: 611 sq mi (1,580 km^{2})
  - Land: 611 sq mi (1,580 km^{2})
  - Water: 0.2 sq mi (0.52 km^{2}) 0.04%

Population (2020)
  - Total: 30,346
  - Estimate (2025): 31,433 ▲
  - Density: 51/sq mi (20/km^{2})
- Time zone: UTC−6 (Central)
  - Summer (DST): UTC−5 (CDT)
- Congressional district: 4th
- Website: gilescountytn.gov

Giles County is a county located in the U.S. state of Tennessee. As of the 2020 census, its population was 30,346. Its county seat is Pulaski.

== History ==
Giles County is named after William Branch Giles, a senator from Virginia who sponsored the admission of Tennessee as the 16th state into the Union. He also sponsored the building of the city and courthouse, which has burned four times. The current courthouse was built in 1909. One of Giles County's local heroes is James McCallum, who served as grandmaster of the Tennessee Masons, a member of the Confederate Congress, and mayor. He lived in Giles County for 70 years.

Until Maury County was established in November 1807, the area of the future Giles County was part of Williamson County. Two years after the formation of Maury County, Giles County was created from southern Maury County on November 14, 1809, by an act of the state legislature. Nearly half of the new county lay in Chickasaw territory until September 1816.

== Geography ==
According to the U.S. Census Bureau, the county has a total area of 611 square miles (1,580 km^{2}), of which 0.2 square miles (0.52 km^{2}) (0.04%) is covered by water.

=== Adjacent counties ===
- Maury County (north)
- Marshall County (northeast)
- Lincoln County (east)
- Limestone County, Alabama (south)
- Lauderdale County, Alabama (southwest)
- Lawrence County (west)

== Demographics ==
Historical population
Census	Pop.	Note	%±
1810	4,546		—
1820	12,558		176.2%
1830	18,703		48.9%
1840	21,494		14.9%
1850	25,949		20.7%
1860	26,166		0.8%
1870	32,413		23.9%
1880	36,014		11.1%
1890	34,957		−2.9%
1900	33,035		−5.5%
1910	32,629		−1.2%
1920	30,948		−5.2%
1930	28,016		−9.5%
1940	29,240		4.4%
1950	26,961		−7.8%
1960	22,410		−16.9%
1970	22,138		−1.2%
1980	24,265		9.6%
1990	25,741		6.1%
2000	29,447		14.4%
2010	29,485		0.1%
2020	30,346		2.9%
2025 (est.)	31,433	▲	3.6%
U.S. Decennial Census; 1790-1960 1900-1990; 1990-2000 2010-2014 2020 2023

=== 2020 census ===
Giles County racial composition
Race	Number	Percentage
White (non-Hispanic)	24,920	82.12%
Black or African American (non-Hispanic)	2,927	9.65%
Native American	113	0.37%
Asian	176	0.58%
Pacific Islander	9	0.03%
Other/Mixed	1,473	4.85%
Hispanic or Latino	728	2.4%

As of the 2020 census, the county had a population of 30,346 and 7,807 families residing in the county. The median age was 44.0 years. 21.0% of residents were under the age of 18 and 20.5% of residents were 65 years of age or older. For every 100 females there were 95.0 males, and for every 100 females age 18 and over there were 93.8 males age 18 and over.

The racial makeup of the county was 82.9% White, 9.7% Black or African American, 0.4% American Indian and Alaska Native, 0.6% Asian, <0.1% Native Hawaiian and Pacific Islander, 0.9% from some other race, and 5.5% from two or more races. Hispanic or Latino residents of any race comprised 2.4% of the population.

26.9% of residents lived in urban areas, while 73.1% lived in rural areas.

There were 12,327 households in the county, of which 27.6% had children under the age of 18 living in them. Of all households, 47.0% were married-couple households, 19.3% were households with a male householder and no spouse or partner present, and 27.0% were households with a female householder and no spouse or partner present. About 29.3% of all households were made up of individuals and 13.8% had someone living alone who was 65 years of age or older.

There were 13,915 housing units, of which 11.4% were vacant. Among occupied housing units, 72.2% were owner-occupied and 27.8% were renter-occupied. The homeowner vacancy rate was 1.5% and the rental vacancy rate was 7.8%.

=== 2000 census ===
As of the census of 2000, there were 29,447 people, 11,713 households, and 8,363 families residing in the county. The population density was 48 people per square mile (19 people/km^{2}). There were 13,113 housing units at an average density of 22 units per square mile (8.5/km^{2}). The racial makeup of the county was 86.44% White, 11.80% Black or African American, 0.30% Native American, 0.35% Asian, 0.01% Pacific Islander, 0.21% from other races, and 0.89% from two or more races. 0.90% of the population were Hispanic or Latino of any race.

There were 11,713 households, out of which 31.40% had children under the age of 18 living with them, 55.80% were married couples living together, 11.90% had a female householder with no husband present, and 28.60% were non-families. 25.70% of all households were made up of individuals, and 11.20% had someone living alone who was 65 years of age or older. The average household size was 2.47 and the average family size was 2.96.

In the county, the population was spread out, with 24.50% under the age of 18, 8.30% from 18 to 24, 27.90% from 25 to 44, 24.80% from 45 to 64, and 14.50% who were 65 years of age or older. The median age was 38 years. For every 100 females there were 94.40 males. For every 100 females age 18 and over, there were 91.20 males.

The median income for a household in the county was $34,824, and the median income for a family was $41,714. Males had a median income of $31,221 versus $22,221 for females. The per capita income for the county was $17,543. About 9.00% of families and 11.70% of the population were below the poverty line, including 14.50% of those under age 18 and 14.80% of those age 65 or over.

== Crime ==
On November 15, 1995, Giles County received minor notoriety after a shooting occurred at Richland High School in the community of Lynnville. A senior student named Jamie Rouse shot two teachers and a student in the north entrance of the school. One teacher (Carolyn Foster) and the student (Diane Collins) were killed, while teacher Carolyn Yancey was wounded in the crime. Rouse was convicted of the shooting and sentenced to life in prison without parole.

In 2000, there were 1,268 arrests made in Giles County, with 781 arrests in the city of Pulaski. One homicide occurred in that year. Based on a 2003 recording conducted by the Uniform Crime Report, the delinquency rate dropped to 71 arrests being made, with 8.8 percent of the county population being arrested that year. No homicides occurred in Giles County in 2003.

== Transportation ==
=== Airport ===
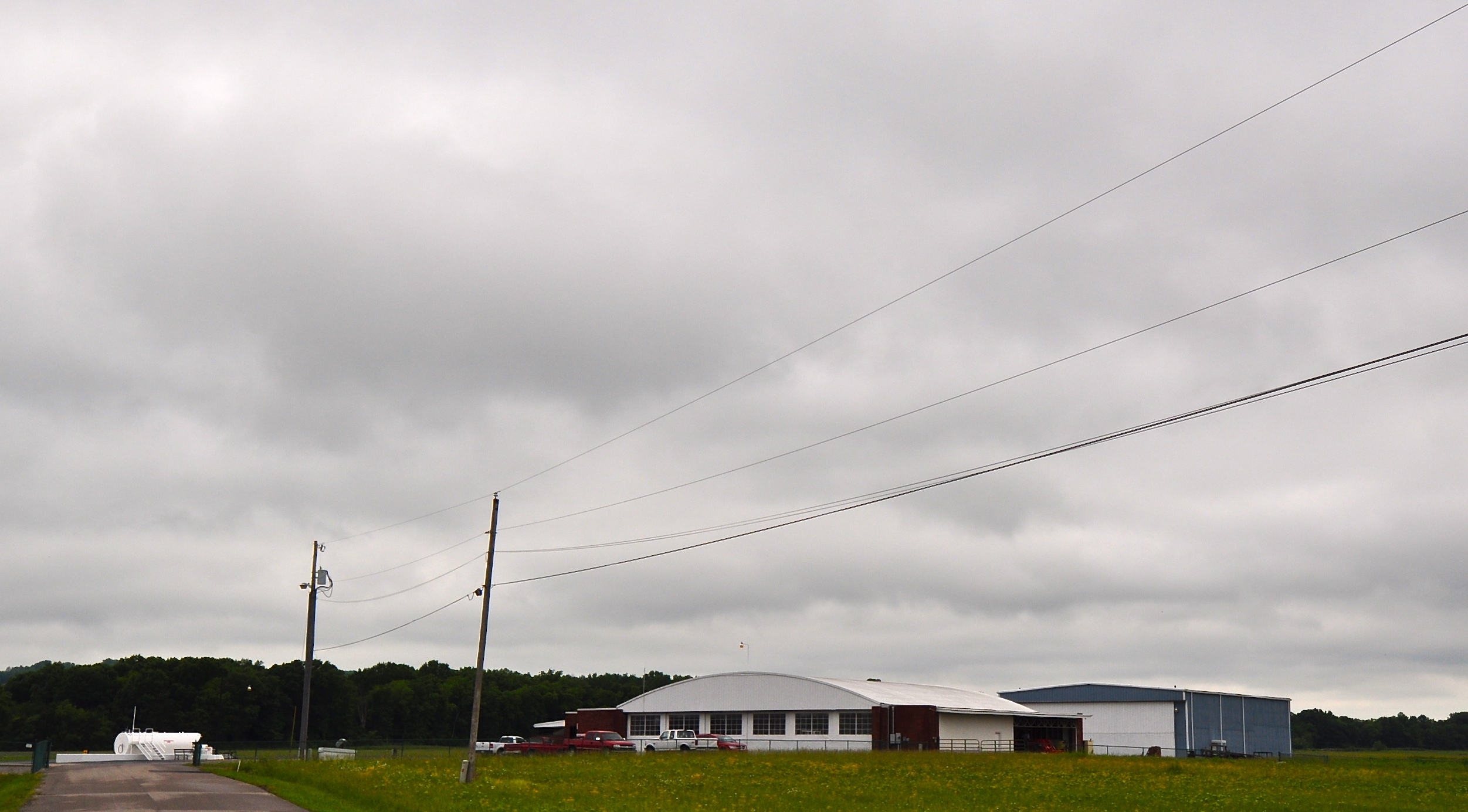
Abernathy Field, May 2014. ICAO Code: KGZS.

Abernathy Field is a public use airport owned by Giles County and the City of Pulaski. It is located three nautical miles (6 km) southwest of the central business district of Pulaski.

=== Major highways ===
- I-65
- US 31
- US 31A
- US 64
- SR 11
- SR 15
- SR 129
- SR 166
- SR 245
- SR 273

== Communities ==
=== Cities ===
- Ardmore (partial)
- Elkton
- Minor Hill
- Pulaski (county seat)

=== Town ===
- Lynnville

=== Census-designated places ===
- Frankewing
- Prospect

=== Unincorporated communities ===
- Aspen Hill
- Aymett Town
- Beech Hill
- Berea
- Campbellsville
- Five Points
- Goodspring
- Liberty Hill
- Olivet
- Waco
- Weakley

== Politics ==
United States presidential election results for Giles County, Tennessee
Year	Republican		Democratic		Third party(ies)	
Year	No.	%	No.	%	No.	%
1912	1,596	31.31%	3,081	60.44%	421	8.26%
1916	1,488	31.65%	3,207	68.22%	6	0.13%
1920	2,224	41.50%	3,129	58.39%	6	0.11%
1924	677	20.76%	2,509	76.94%	75	2.30%
1928	1,032	27.94%	2,661	72.06%	0	0.00%
1932	619	18.12%	2,773	81.15%	25	0.73%
1936	600	13.70%	3,760	85.88%	18	0.41%
1940	692	15.37%	3,796	84.34%	13	0.29%
1944	751	15.02%	4,249	84.98%	0	0.00%
1948	717	14.72%	3,676	75.45%	479	9.83%
1952	1,649	25.98%	4,640	73.11%	58	0.91%
1956	1,401	22.65%	4,750	76.79%	35	0.57%
1960	1,598	24.54%	4,879	74.91%	36	0.55%
1964	1,378	21.81%	4,940	78.19%	0	0.00%
1968	1,264	17.01%	2,203	29.64%	3,966	53.36%
1972	2,914	57.69%	1,875	37.12%	262	5.19%
1976	1,952	26.93%	5,225	72.09%	71	0.98%
1980	2,757	36.58%	4,653	61.74%	127	1.69%
1984	3,875	50.07%	3,812	49.26%	52	0.67%
1988	3,518	47.04%	3,918	52.39%	42	0.56%
1992	2,827	28.90%	5,601	57.26%	1,353	13.83%
1996	3,269	36.20%	4,948	54.80%	813	9.00%
2000	4,377	43.48%	5,527	54.91%	162	1.61%
2004	6,163	53.42%	5,273	45.71%	101	0.88%
2008	6,902	59.05%	4,614	39.47%	173	1.48%
2012	6,915	64.03%	3,760	34.82%	124	1.15%
2016	7,970	71.56%	2,917	26.19%	250	2.24%
2020	9,784	74.10%	3,298	24.98%	121	0.92%
2024	10,394	77.07%	2,974	22.05%	119	0.88%

Although historically part of overwhelmingly Democratic and secessionist Middle Tennessee, Giles County has, like much of the rural white South, become overwhelmingly Republican since 2000 due to opposition to the Democratic Party's liberal views on social issues.

== Notable people ==
- Walter Herschel Beech, co-founder of Beechcraft Aircraft; born in Giles County.
- Aaron V. Brown, Governor of Tennessee from 1845 to 1847; resident of Giles County, Tennessee.
- Neill S. Brown, Governor of Tennessee from 1847 to 1849; born in Giles County.
- John C. Brown, Governor of Tennessee from 1871 to 1875; born in Giles County.
- James McCallum, Grandmaster of the Tennessee Masons, a member of the Confederate Congress, and mayor. He lived in Giles County for 70 years.
- John Crowe Ransom, educator, scholar, literary critic, poet, essayist and editor; born in Giles County.
- Tyree R. Rivers, US Army brigadier general, raised in Giles County
- William C. Rivers, US Army major general, raised in Giles County
- James David Vaughan, music teacher, composer, song book publisher, the founder of the Vaughan Conservatory of Music and the James D. Vaughan Publishing Company; born in Giles County.
- Archibald Wright, Justice of the Tennessee Supreme Court from 1858 to 1885; raised in Giles County.

== See also ==
- Giles County High School
- National Register of Historic Places listings in Giles County, Tennessee
