= Aymett Town, Tennessee =

Unincorporated community in Tennessee, US

Coordinates: 35°10′34″N 86°57′35″W

Aymett Town is an unincorporated community in Giles County, Tennessee, in the United States.

== History ==
A post office called Aymett was established in 1894, and remained in operation until it was discontinued in 1902. The community was named for Allen Aymett, an early settler.
