= Olivet, Giles County, Tennessee =

- Unincorporated community
- Location within Tennessee Location within the United States
- Coordinates: 35°17′39″N 87°01′38″W
- Country: United States
- State: Tennessee
- County: Giles
- Elevation: 689 ft (210 m)
- Time zone: UTC-6 (Central (CST))
  - Summer (DST): UTC-5 (CDT)
- Area code: 931
- GNIS feature ID: 1315652

Olivet is an unincorporated community in Giles County, Tennessee. Olivet is located along U.S. Route 31 and State Route 7 6.5 miles (10.5 km) north of Pulaski.
