= Beech Hill, Georgia =

Coordinates: 32°49′21″N 83°00′33″W

Beech Hill is an extinct town in Wilkinson County, in the U.S. state of Georgia. The GNIS classifies it as a populated place.

== History ==
A variant name was "Beechhill". A post office called Beech Hill was established in 1889, and remained in operation until 1912. The community had a depot on the Central of Georgia Railroad.
