= Five Points, Giles County, Tennessee =

- Unincorporated community
- Location within Tennessee Location within the United States
- Coordinates: 35°10′57″N 86°56′03″W
- Country: United States
- State: Tennessee
- County: Giles
- Elevation: 715 ft (218 m)
- Time zone: UTC-6 (Central (CST))
  - Summer (DST): UTC-5 (CDT)
- Area code: 931
- GNIS feature ID: 1315058

Five Points is an unincorporated community in Giles County, Tennessee. Five Points is located along U.S. Route 64 and Tennessee State Route 15 5.6 miles (9.0 km) east-southeast of Pulaski.
