= Weakley, Tennessee =

Unincorporated community in Tennessee, US

Coordinates: 35°15′52″N 87°11′19″W

Weakley is an unincorporated community in Giles County, in the U.S. state of Tennessee.

== History ==
A post office called Weakley was established in 1882, and remained in operation until it was discontinued in 1910.
