= Beech Hill, Giles County, Tennessee =

Unincorporated community in Tennessee, U.S.

Coordinates: 35°13′47″N 86°53′21″W

Beech Hill is an unincorporated community in Giles County, in the U.S. state of Tennessee.

== History ==
The community was likely named from the presence of beech trees near the town site.
