= Beech Hill (Dublin, New Hampshire) =

Historic house in New Hampshire, United States

- U.S. National Register of Historic Places
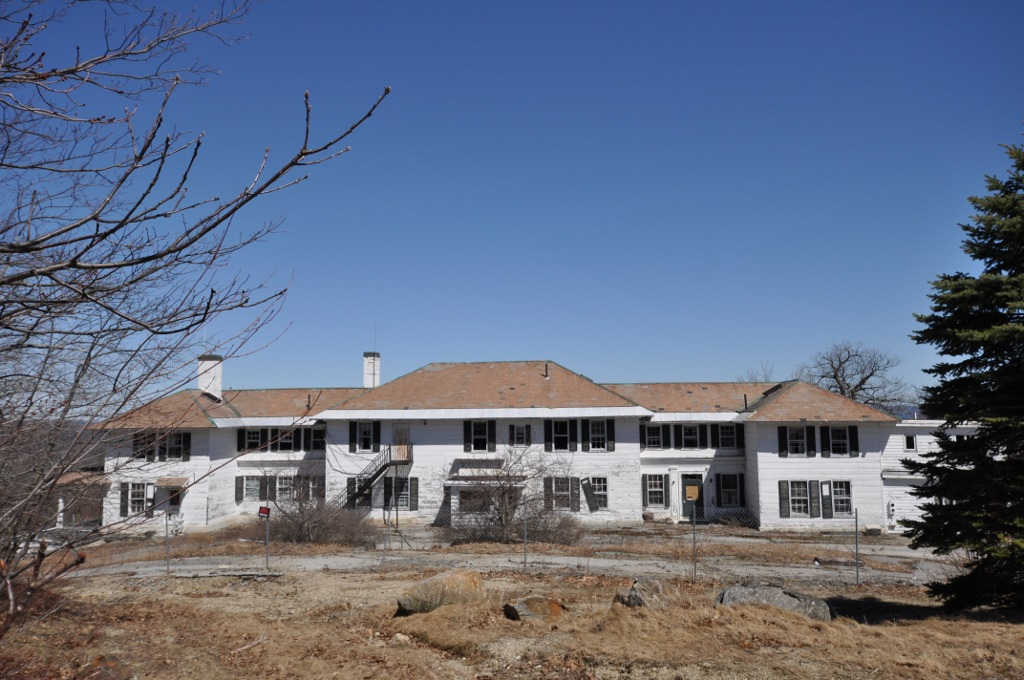

- Location within New Hampshire Location within the United States
- Location: Off New Harrisville Rd., Dublin, New Hampshire
- Coordinates: 42°54′39″N 72°4′0″W
- Area: 1.4 acres (0.57 ha)
- Built: 1902
- Architectural style: Georgian Revival
- Demolished: 2021
- MPS: Dublin MRA
- NRHP reference No.: 83004012
- Added to NRHP: December 15, 1983

Beech Hill is a historic former summer estate off New Harrisville Road in Dublin, New Hampshire. The centerpiece of the estate was a large Georgian Revival mansion with hip roof and wide projecting eaves, which had views of the surrounding area. The mansion was listed on the National Register of Historic Places in 1983. The property remains in private hands, but most of the surrounding estate is now local conservation land, with public hiking trails.

== Description and history ==
Beech Hill is located on a hilltop just north of the town center of Dublin, on the west side of New Harrisville Road. Sited prominently near the crest of the hill was the main house, a sprawling two-story structure whose main section was covered by a hip roof. Its exterior trim included corner pilasters and a dentillated cornice. The main block was extended by wings, including a more modern one that extended to one side of the swimming pool sited just east of the building. The building was demolished in 2021 due to excessive vandalism and safety concerns.

The house was designed by Charles A. Platt for his sister and brother-in-law, and built in 1902–3. From 1949 until 2001 the property was used for a variety of medical and substance abuse treatment purposes. The entire estate was acquired by a local conservation land trust in 2007, which sold the house into private hands and built walking trails on the rest of the estate.

== See also ==
- National Register of Historic Places listings in Cheshire County, New Hampshire
