= National Register of Historic Places listings in Maury County, Tennessee =

Location of Maury County in Tennessee

This is a list of the National Register of Historic Places listings in Maury County, Tennessee.

This is intended to be a complete list of the properties and districts on the National Register of Historic Places in Maury County, Tennessee, United States. Latitude and longitude coordinates are provided for many National Register properties and districts; these locations may be seen together in a map.

There are 70 properties and districts listed on the National Register in the county, including 2 National Historic Landmarks. There are two former listings.

Contents: Counties in Tennessee
Anderson – Bedford – Benton – Bledsoe – Blount – Bradley – Campbell – Cannon – Carroll – Carter – Cheatham – Chester – Claiborne – Clay – Cocke – Coffee – Crockett – Cumberland – Davidson – Decatur – DeKalb – Dickson – Dyer – Fayette – Fentress – Franklin – Gibson – Giles – Grainger – Greene – Grundy – Hamblen – Hamilton – Hancock – Hardeman – Hardin – Hawkins – Haywood – Henderson – Henry – Hickman – Houston – Humphreys – Jackson – Jefferson – Johnson – Knox – Lake – Lauderdale – Lawrence – Lewis – Lincoln – Loudon – Macon – Madison – Marion – Marshall – Maury – McMinn – McNairy – Meigs – Monroe – Montgomery – Moore – Morgan – Obion – Overton – Perry – Pickett – Polk – Putnam – Rhea – Roane – Robertson – Rutherford – Scott – Sequatchie – Sevier – Shelby – Smith – Stewart – Sullivan – Sumner – Tipton – Trousdale – Unicoi – Union – Van Buren – Warren – Washington – Wayne – Weakley – White – Williamson – Wilson

This National Park Service list is complete through NPS recent listings posted May 1, 2026.

== Current listings ==
| | Name on the Register | Image | Date listed | Location | City or town | Description |
|---|---|---|---|---|---|---|
| 1 | Jonathan Amis House | | April 26, 1984 (#84003620) | Covey Hollow Rd. 35°29′27″N 87°02′43″W | McCains | |
| 2 | Ashwood Rural Historic District | | February 10, 1989 (#88003247) | Spans U.S. Route 43 between Columbia and Mount Pleasant; 35°34′24″N 87°08′18″W | Columbia | |
| 3 | The Athenaeum | The Athenaeum | April 24, 1973 (#73001809) | 808 Athenaeum St. 35°36′51″N 87°02′29″W | Columbia | |
| 4 | Beechlawn Advance and Retreat | | May 14, 1971 (#71000824) | South of Columbia on U.S. Route 31; 35°34′08″N 87°02′32″W | Columbia | |
| 5 | Blythewood | Blythewood | April 11, 1973 (#73001810) | Trotwood and Hatcher Lane; 35°36′18″N 87°03′49″W | Columbia | |
| 6 | Merritt H. Booker House | Merritt H. Booker House | July 18, 1985 (#85001561) | Scott Hollow Rd. 35°28′15″N 87°00′33″W | Culleoka | |
| 7 | Breckenridge Hatter's Shop | Breckenridge Hatter's Shop | December 13, 1984 (#84000613) | N. Main St. 35°32′07″N 87°12′23″W | Mount Pleasant | |
| 8 | Martin Cheairs House | Martin Cheairs House | December 12, 1976 (#76001787) | U.S. Route 31; 35°44′53″N 86°55′54″W | Spring Hill | |
| 9 | Church House | Church House | October 19, 1978 (#78002609) | 312 W. 7th St. 35°36′56″N 87°02′19″W | Columbia | Also known as "Barrow House" |
| 10 | Cleburne Jersey Farm | | November 22, 2000 (#00001430) | 2319 Sugar Ridge Rd. 35°46′32″N 86°56′19″W | Spring Hill | Established in 1872 and home to that is home to one of the oldest milking Jersey herds in the nation. |
| 11 | Clifton Place | Clifton Place | July 8, 1970 (#70000613) | Southwest of Columbia on the Mt. Pleasant Highway; 35°34′40″N 87°06′52″W | Columbia | |
| 12 | Columbia Arsenal | Columbia Arsenal | September 19, 1977 (#77001281) | W. 7th St. 35°36′53″N 87°03′30″W | Columbia | |
| 13 | Columbia Central High School | Columbia Central High School | April 21, 1980 (#80003848) | W. 8th St. 35°36′49″N 87°02′29″W | Columbia | |
| 14 | Columbia Commercial Historic District | Columbia Commercial Historic District | August 16, 1984 (#84003625) | Roughly bounded by 7th, 8th, Woodland, and High St. 35°36′50″N 87°02′04″W | Columbia | |
| 15 | Columbia Hydroelectric Station | Columbia Hydroelectric Station | February 9, 1990 (#89002364) | Riverside Park, Riverside Dr., and the Duck River; 35°36′56″N 87°00′53″W | Columbia | |
| 16 | Columbia West End Historic District | Columbia West End Historic District | March 13, 1986 (#86000394) | Roughly along W. 7th St. between Frierson St. and the former Seaboard System railroad line 35°36′58″N 87°02′49″W | Columbia | |
| 17 | Culleoka Methodist Episcopal Church, South | Culleoka Methodist Episcopal Church, South | May 22, 1986 (#86001134) | Quality St. 35°28′53″N 86°59′06″W | Culleoka | |
| 18 | Elm Springs | Elm Springs | March 13, 1986 (#86000402) | Mooresville Pike; 35°35′05″N 87°01′50″W | Columbia | |
| 19 | Ewell Farm | Ewell Farm | May 24, 1976 (#76001788) | Depot Lane; 35°45′38″N 86°56′37″W | Spring Hill | |
| 20 | Fairmont | Fairmont | September 1, 1983 (#83003052) | Mooresville Pike; 35°35′10″N 87°01′31″W | Columbia | |
| 21 | First United Methodist Church of Columbia | First United Methodist Church of Columbia | August 30, 1984 (#84003628) | 222 W. 7th St. 35°36′55″N 87°02′11″W | Columbia | |
| 22 | Lucius Frierson House | | September 1, 1978 (#78002610) | W. 7th St. 35°36′57″N 87°02′25″W | Columbia | |
| 23 | John Gordon House | John Gordon House | April 18, 1974 (#74000333) | Northwest of Williamsport off State Route 50; 35°43′11″N 87°15′38″W | Williamsport | |
| 24 | Grace Episcopal Church | Grace Episcopal Church | May 17, 1976 (#76001789) | U.S. Route 31; 35°45′09″N 86°55′45″W | Spring Hill | |
| 25 | Hamilton Place | | July 16, 1973 (#73001812) | Mt. Pleasant Pike, west of Columbia off U.S. Route 43; 35°34′18″N 87°09′11″W | Columbia | |
| 26 | Hardison Mill Farm | | November 13, 2017 (#100001826) | 4554 US 431; 35°36′53″N 86°49′24″W | Columbia vicinity | |
| 27 | Haynes Haven Stock Farm | | July 6, 2023 (#100009094) | US 31/Nashville Hwy. between Northfield and Denning Lns. 35°43′36″N 86°57′41″W | Spring Hill | |
| 28 | James Kennedy House | | November 6, 1987 (#87001780) | Rogers Ford Rd. 35°39′25″N 86°59′45″W | Columbia | |
| 29 | Patrick Maguire House | Patrick Maguire House | December 15, 1983 (#83004270) | 105 N. Campbell Boulevard; 35°37′34″N 87°02′28″W | Columbia | |
| 30 | Dr. Samuel Mayes House | | October 25, 1993 (#93000345) | Junction of Zion Ln. and Canaan Rd. 35°36′00″N 87°10′53″W | Columbia | |
| 31 | Mayes-Hutton House | Mayes-Hutton House | July 8, 1970 (#70000614) | 306 W. 6th St. 35°37′01″N 87°02′17″W | Columbia | |
| 32 | Mercer Hall | Mercer Hall | December 16, 1982 (#82001730) | 902 Mercer Ct. 35°36′35″N 87°02′46″W | Columbia | |
| 33 | Washington Miller House | | November 14, 2012 (#12000944) | 1450 Frye Rd. 35°42′04″N 86°59′25″W | Columbia | |
| 34 | Mount Pleasant Commercial Historic District | | November 13, 2003 (#03001160) | Roughly bounded by N. and S. Main Sts., Public Sq., and Hay Long Ave. 35°32′05″N 87°12′26″W | Mount Pleasant | |
| 35 | North Main Street Historic District | | August 8, 1989 (#89000263) | Roughly N. Main St. from Shofner St. to 3rd St. 35°32′24″N 87°12′14″W | Mount Pleasant | |
| 36 | Old Natchez Trace | Old Natchez Trace | May 30, 1975 (#75002125) | From the Alabama/Tennessee border to State Route 100 in Davidson County | Santa Fe | Extends into Davidson, Hickman, Lawrence, Lewis, Wayne, and Williamson counties |
| 37 | Old Stone Creamery | | August 1, 2025 (#100012065) | 2301 Sugar Ridge Road; 35°45′45″N 86°56′32″W | Spring Hill | Creamery located on and operated by the Cleburne Jersey Farm |
| 38 | Pillow Place | | December 8, 1983 (#83004271) | Campbellsville Pike; 35°34′17″N 87°04′52″W | Columbia | |
| 39 | Pillow-Bethel House | | December 12, 1976 (#76001785) | Southwest of Columbia off U.S. Route 43; 35°34′05″N 87°06′56″W | Columbia | |
| 40 | Pine Hill | Pine Hill | December 15, 1983 (#83004272) | Old Zion Lane; 35°35′11″N 87°07′39″W | Ashwood | |
| 41 | Pleasant Historic District | | August 8, 1989 (#89000264) | Roughly bounded by Haylong Ave., Pleasant, Bond, Wheeler, Adams, and Cherry Sts., Washington Ave., and College St. 35°32′06″N 87°12′48″W | Mount Pleasant | |
| 42 | Pleasant Mount Cumberland Presbyterian Church | Pleasant Mount Cumberland Presbyterian Church | August 16, 1977 (#77001282) | Southeast of Columbia off State Route 50; 35°32′32″N 86°58′08″W | Columbia | |
| 43 | Polk Sisters' House | Polk Sisters' House | May 21, 1975 (#75001770) | 305 W. 7th St. 35°36′54″N 87°02′16″W | Columbia | |
| 44 | James K. Polk Home | James K. Polk Home | October 15, 1966 (#66000728) | W. 7th and S. High Sts. 35°36′54″N 87°02′14″W | Columbia | |
| 45 | Pottsville General Store | Pottsville General Store | November 14, 2017 (#100001827) | 4205 US 431; 35°38′16″N 86°49′31″W | Columbia vicinity | |
| 46 | Prewitt-Amis-Finney House | Prewitt-Amis-Finney House | December 1, 1997 (#97001503) | 2629 Pullen Mill Rd. 35°27′44″N 87°00′02″W | Culleoka | |
| 47 | Rally Hill | Rally Hill | August 16, 1984 (#84003638) | 319 W. 8th St. 35°36′48″N 87°02′20″W | Columbia | |
| 48 | Rattle and Snap | Rattle and Snap | November 11, 1971 (#71000825) | Andrew Jackson Highway (State Route 43); 35°33′38″N 87°09′12″W | Columbia | |
| 49 | Rippavilla | Rippavilla | July 19, 1996 (#96000773) | U.S. Route 31, approximately 1.5 miles south of its junction with Kedron Rd. 35°43′54″N 86°57′14″W | Spring Hill | |
| 50 | Ritter-Morton House | Ritter-Morton House | December 12, 1976 (#76001790) | McLemore Ave. 35°45′02″N 86°55′45″W | Spring Hill | |
| 51 | Rockdale Furnace Historic District (40MU487) | | July 21, 1988 (#88001100) | Address Restricted | Rockdale | |
| 52 | St. John's Episcopal Church | St. John's Episcopal Church | July 8, 1970 (#70000615) | West of Columbia on U.S. Route 43; 35°34′27″N 87°08′20″W | Columbia | |
| 53 | St. Mark United Primitive Baptist Church | St. Mark United Primitive Baptist Church | July 14, 2000 (#00000811) | Maury Hill St. 35°45′01″N 86°55′58″W | Spring Hill | |
| 54 | St. Peter's Episcopal Church | St. Peter's Episcopal Church | June 27, 1979 (#79002448) | 311 W. 7th St. 35°36′52″N 87°02′18″W | Columbia | |
| 55 | Andrew Scott House | Andrew Scott House | August 4, 1995 (#95000976) | 3991 Pulaski Highway; 35°27′57″N 87°02′31″W | Culleoka | |
| 56 | Shelby Bend Archeological District | | February 1, 1990 (#89001760) | Address Restricted | Greenfield Bend | Extends into Hickman County |
| 57 | Skipwith Hall | Skipwith Hall | November 23, 1977 (#77001283) | West of Columbia on State Route 50; 35°38′29″N 87°08′35″W | Columbia | |
| 58 | Spring Hill Presbyterian Church | Spring Hill Presbyterian Church | July 19, 1984 (#84003640) | S. Main St. 35°44′56″N 86°55′52″W | Spring Hill | |
| 59 | State Bank of Tennessee | | November 2, 1978 (#78002611) | 201 W. 7th St. 35°36′53″N 87°02′09″W | Columbia | |
| 60 | Absalom Thompson House | | September 11, 1979 (#79002449) | South of Spring Hill on Denning Rd; 35°43′19″N 86°55′47″W | Spring Hill | |
| 61 | Union Station | Union Station | October 23, 1986 (#86002908) | Depot St. 35°36′29″N 87°02′14″W | Columbia | |
| 62 | United States Post Office and Court House | | September 11, 2018 (#100002938) | 815 S Garden St. 35°36′50″N 87°02′09″W | Columbia | |
| 63 | Vine Hill | Vine Hill | July 15, 1983 (#83003053) | Sawdust Rd. 35°38′47″N 87°12′47″W | Cross Bridges | |
| 64 | Walnut Grove | Walnut Grove | March 8, 1984 (#84003641) | 510 N. Main St. 35°32′25″N 87°12′11″W | Mount Pleasant | |
| 65 | William Watkins House | | October 23, 1986 (#86002901) | Canaan Rd. 35°33′53″N 87°11′39″W | Mount Pleasant | |
| 66 | Webster Farm | Webster Farm | July 19, 1996 (#96000770) | 3166 Hampshire Pike; 35°37′19″N 87°13′15″W | Cross Bridges | |
| 67 | George Webster House | | April 5, 1984 (#84003646) | Sawdust Rd. 35°38′02″N 87°12′44″W | Williamsport | |
| 68 | West Sixth Street and Mayes Place Historic District | | February 25, 1978 (#78002612) | W. 6th St. and Mayes Pl. 35°37′00″N 87°02′18″W | Columbia | |
| 69 | White Hall | White Hall | April 5, 1984 (#84003661) | Duplex Rd. 35°45′08″N 86°55′32″W | Spring Hill | |
| 70 | Zion Presbyterian Church | Zion Presbyterian Church | June 13, 1972 (#72001245) | 6.3 miles west of Columbia off State Route 99; 35°35′56″N 87°08′42″W | Columbia | |

== Former listings ==
| | Name on the Register | Image | Date listed | Date removed | Location | City or town | Description |
|---|---|---|---|---|---|---|---|
| 1 | Cherry Glen | | July 2, 1973 (#73002243) | June 10, 1985 | SW of Columbia off US 43 | Columbia | Destroyed by fire on April 13, 1985. |
| 2 | Derryberry House | | November 7, 1990 (#90001656) | June 10, 2022 | New Lasea Rd. east of its junction with Interstate 65; 35°40′21″N 86°52′40″W | Spring Hill | |
| 3 | Polk Manor | | September 7, 1973 (#74002326) | October 1, 1974 | W of Columbia on US 43 | Columbia | Destroyed by fire on August 31, 1974. |

== See also ==
- List of National Historic Landmarks in Tennessee
- National Register of Historic Places listings in Tennessee
