= Blythewood (disambiguation) =

Blythewood is a town in South Carolina.

Blythewood may also refer to:

- Blythewood (Amite City, Louisiana), a National Register of Historic Places listing in Tangipahoa Parish, Louisiana
- Blythewood (Columbia, Tennessee), a National Register of Historic Places listing in Maury County, Tennessee
- Blythewood, Western Australia, a locality in Western Australia

== See also ==
- Woodlands and Blythewood, Clarkesville, GA, listed on the NRHP in Georgia
