= Special routes of U.S. Route 412 =

Special routes of U.S. Route 412

Highway system
- United States Numbered Highway System; List; Special; Divided

Eight special routes of U.S. Route 412 exist.

== Eastern Oklahoma alternate route ==
U.S. Highway 412 Alternate
- Location: Locust Grove–West Siloam Springs, Oklahoma
- Length: 33.81 mi (54.41 km)

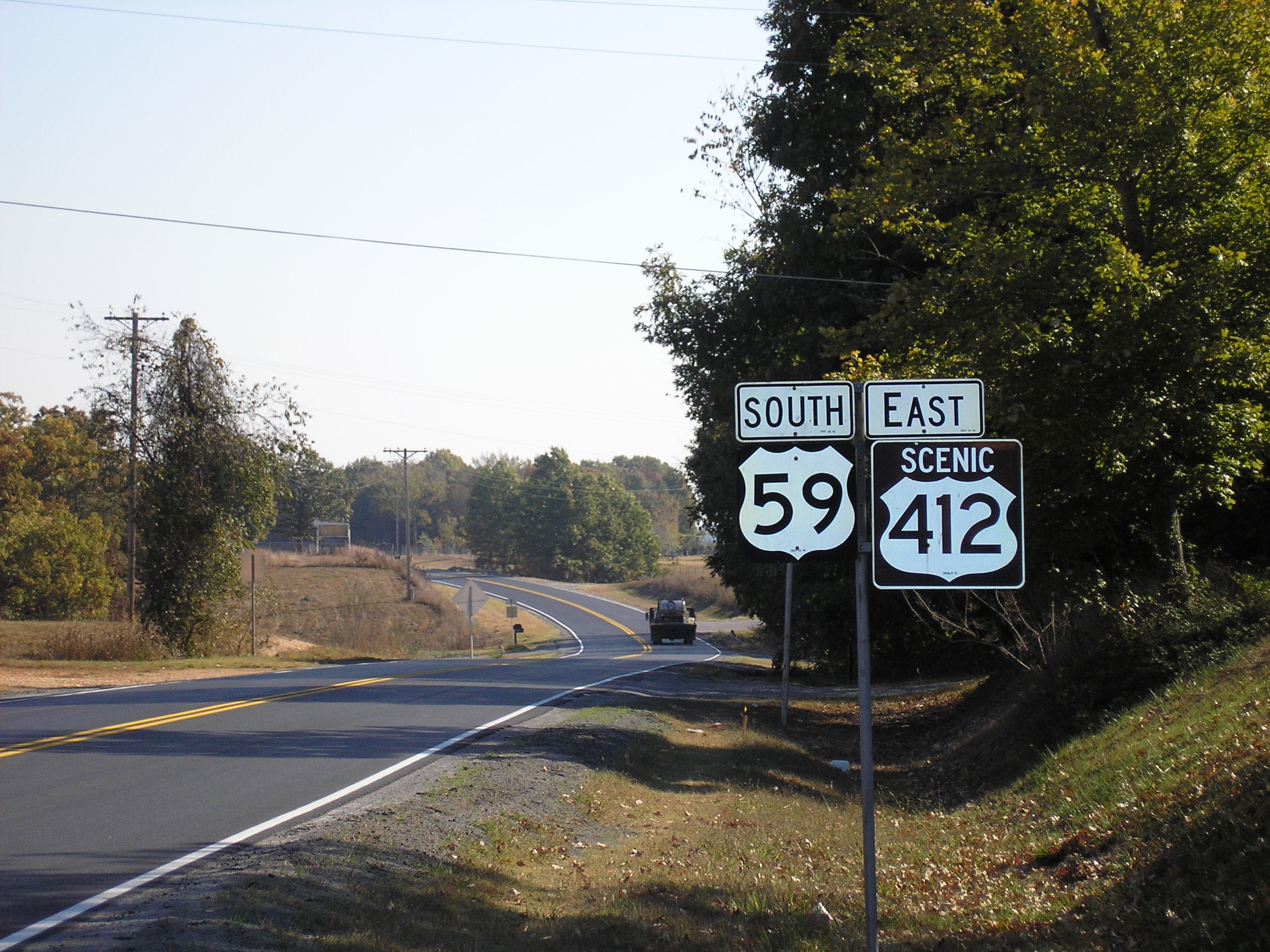
Sign for former Scenic US-412 designation in Kansas, Oklahoma, concurrent with US-59.

U.S. Route 412 Alternate (formerly Scenic US-412) is a special route of U.S. Route 412 in eastern Oklahoma. It serves as a free bypass route to the toll Cherokee Turnpike, which carries US-412.

It begins about 7 miles (11 km) east of Chouteau near Locust Grove and ends about 12 miles (19 km) west of West Siloam Springs near Kansas.

Alternate US-412 was marked as "Scenic US-412" prior to 2012. This was one of only two scenic special routes in the country, the other being U.S. Route 40 Scenic in Maryland. Maps usually still marked the road as "Alternate US-412", however. Scenic US-412 was originally part of State Highway 11 and later State Highway 33.

== Hindsville business route ==
U.S. Highway 412B
- Location: Hindsville, Arkansas
- Length: 2.65 mi (4.26 km)
- Existed: 2007–present

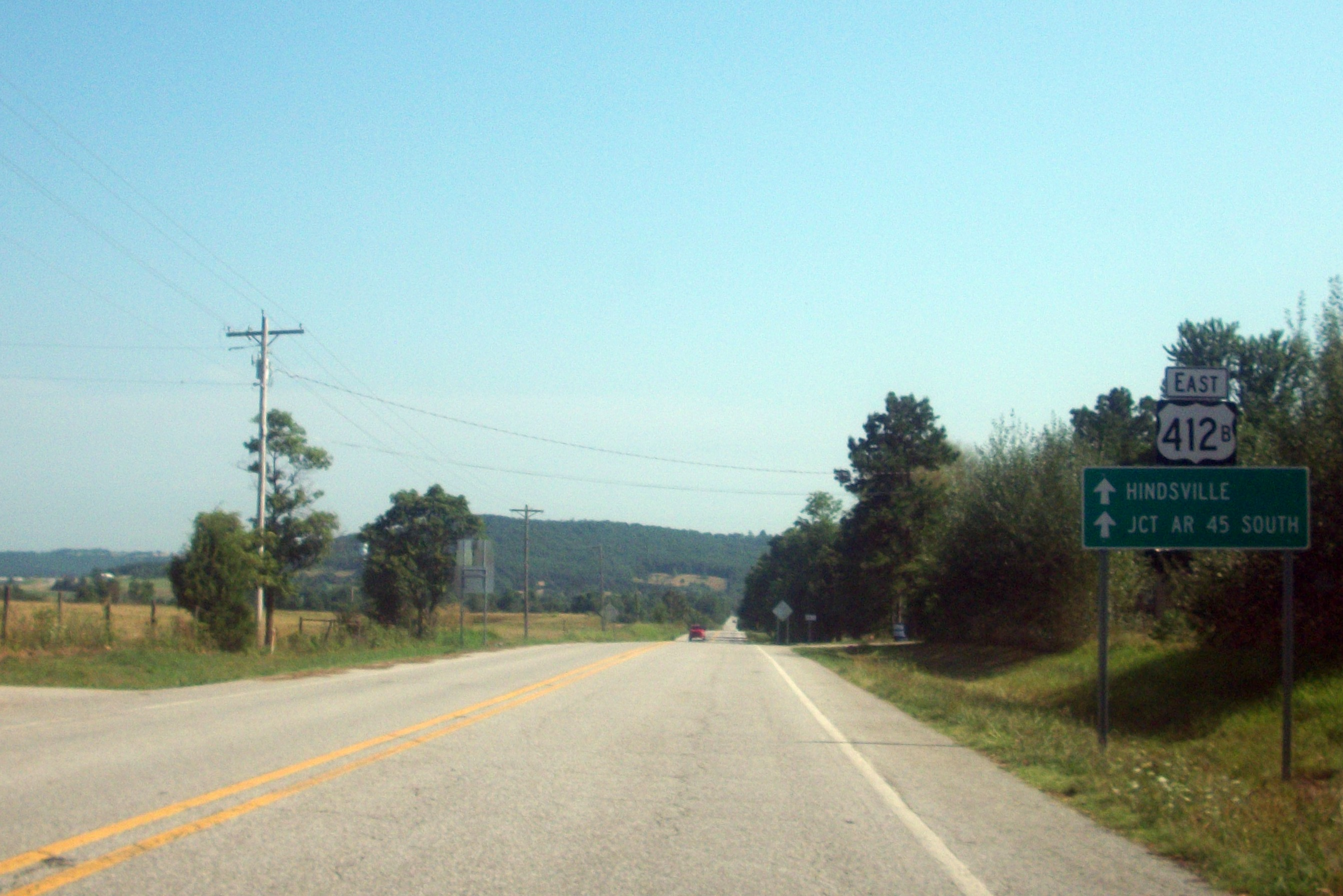
US 412B near its northern terminus at US 412.

US Route 412 Business (US 412B) is a business route of 2.65 miles (4.26 km) in Hindsville, Arkansas. The route has its northern terminus is at US 412/Arkansas Highway 45 north of Hindsville. Posted as US 412B, the route runs through Hindsville, meeting AR 45 south before terminating at US 412 southeast of Hindsville. It was created in 2007 following completion of a 4 lane bypass around the east side of town.

Major intersections

The entire route is in Madison County.

Location	mi	km	Destinations	Notes
	0.00	0.00	US 412 – Huntsville, Springdale	Southern terminus
	0.51	0.82	AR 45 south – Fayetteville	South end of AR 45 overlap
	2.65	4.26	US 412 / AR 45 north – Huntsville, Springdale	Northern terminus; north end of AR 45 overlap
1.000 mi = 1.609 km; 1.000 km = 0.621 mi: Concurrency terminus

== Mountain Home business route ==
US Route 412 Business (US 412B) is a business route of Mountain Home, Arkansas. It follows the former alignment of U.S. Route 412 and U.S. Route 62. It was created when US Route 412 and 62 was relocated onto a 4-lane bypass.

== Huntsville business route ==
U.S. Highway 412B
- Location: Huntsville, Arkansas
- Length: 5.48 mi (8.82 km)

U.S. Route 412 Business (US 412B) is a business route of 5.48 miles (8.82 km) in Huntsville, Arkansas. The route begins at US 412 west of Huntsville and runs east through town as Main Street. US 412B has a junction with AR 74 before it passes the Madison County Courthouse. The road continues east, forming a concurrency with Arkansas Highway 23 north for 0.5 miles (0.80 km) before the two roads diverge. The highway continues another 1.87 miles (3.01 km) before terminating at US 412 east of Huntsville.

== Walnut Ridge business route ==
U.S. Highway 412B
- Location: Walnut Ridge, Arkansas
- Length: 6.12 mi (9.85 km)
- Existed: 2023–present

U.S. Route 412 Business (US 412B) is a business route of 6.12 miles (9.85 km) in Walnut Ridge, Arkansas. The route begins at US 412/63 near Portia and runs 6.1 miles (9.8 km) before terminating at an interchange with US 412/US 67 (Future I-57).

=== Major intersections ===
The entire route is in Walnut Ridge, Lawrence County.

mi	km	Destinations	Notes
0.00	0.00	US 412 / US 63	Western terminus
4.71	7.58	US 67B (4th Street)	Southern terminus of US 67B
4.93	7.93	AR 367 / AR 34 (Front Street) – Hoxie, O'Kean	Western terminus of AR 34, Northern terminus of AR 367
5.34	8.59	AR 91 south – Egypt	AR 91 Northern terminus
6.12	9.85	US 412 east / US 67 / Future I-57 – Paragould, Pocahontas, Little Rock	Eastern terminus
1.000 mi = 1.609 km; 1.000 km = 0.621 mi

== Light business route ==
U.S. Highway 412B
- Location: Light, Arkansas
- Length: 2.12 mi (3.41 km)
- Existed: 2021–present

U.S. Route 412 Business (US 412B) is a business route of 6.62 miles (10.65 km) in Paragould, Arkansas. It was created in 2021 after US 412 bypassed the community while widening into a 4-lane from Walnut Ridge to Arkansas Highway 141.

== Paragould business route ==
U.S. Highway 412B
- Location: Paragould, Arkansas
- Length: 6.62 mi (10.65 km)
- Existed: 2020–present

U.S. Route 412 Business (US 412B) is a business route of 6.62 miles (10.65 km) in Paragould, Arkansas. It was created in 2020 after US 412 was rerouted onto a bypass of the city and consists of its former alignment through the city's downtown. The route begins at US 412 near Paragould's western boundary and runs 4.1 miles (6.6 km) before intersecting the short spur route U.S. Route 49Y (US 49Y) along with U.S. Route 49/Arkansas Highway 1 and forming a concurrency with U.S. Route 49 Business (US 49B), which turns north after approximately 1 mile (1.6 km). The road also meets Arkansas Highway 69 (AR 69) before terminating 1.6 miles (2.6 km) east of the city center at another intersection with US 412.

=== Major intersections ===
The entire route is in Paragould, Greene County.

mi	km	Destinations	Notes
0.00	0.00	US 412	Western terminus
4.19	6.74	US 49Y to US 49 north – Piggott	Western terminus of US 49Y
4.59	7.39	US 49 / AR 1 – Jonesboro, Piggott	Western end of US 49B concurrency
5.59	9.00	US 49B north / AR 135 north – Business District	Eastern end of US 49B concurrency, western end of AR 135 concurrency
5.79	9.32	AR 69 south (South 2nd Avenue)	Northern terminus of AR 69
6.62	10.65	US 412 east / AR 135 south – Cardwell, MO	Eastern terminus; eastern end of AR 135 concurrency
6.62	10.65	US 412 west – Jonesboro	Eastern terminus; eastern end of AR 135 concurrency
1.000 mi = 1.609 km; 1.000 km = 0.621 mi: Concurrency terminus

== Kennett alternate route ==
U.S. Route 412 Alternate
- Location: Kennett, Missouri
- Existed: 2015

A temporary alternate route was assigned to parts of Route O and Route VV during road construction in converting US 412 into a four lane highway in 2015.

== Jackson business loop ==
U.S. Route 412 Business
- Location: Jackson, Tennessee

U.S. Route 412 Business (US 412 Bus.) is a business route in Jackson, Tennessee, that is overlapped with State Route 20 (SR 20). The road runs from US 412 at Exit 79 on Interstate 40 along Hollywood Drive to North Parkway, and later joins an overlap with US-70 at Whitehall Street, until it ends at the eastern terminus of another overlap with US 70/412, just southwest of Exit 87 on I-40.

== Columbia business loop ==
U.S. Route 412 Business
- Location: Columbia, Tennessee

U.S. Route 412 Business (US 412 Bus.) is a business route and former section of mainline US 412 in Columbia, Tennessee. The route begins at the interchange with US 43 and the western terminus of its concurrency with US 412, as Hampshire Pike. State Route 50 (SR 50) intersects the route from Williamsport Pike, and joins the route in a concurrency until after they cross a bridge over Bigby Creek, and SR 50 turns south onto James Campbell Boulevard West. From there, the name of Hampshire Pike becomes West Seventh Street. From there the route runs along the north side of the historic Columbia Arsenal, and several blocks after a railroad crossing it serves as the northern terminus of SR 243. Closer to downtown Columbia, the road becomes line with more historic sites along with some locally notable ones, such as the West Seventh Church of Christ and the Oakes and Nichols Funeral Home, then the NRHP-listed Robert Church House, and across from that the headquarters for WKRM-AM/WKOM-FM. This is followed by the St. Peter's Episcopal Church across from the local Knights of Columbus chapter, and then the James K. Polk Home and Sisters' House across from the Maury County Visitor Center.

Entering the Columbia Commercial Historic District, West Seventh Street approaches Maury County Courthouse Square, but one block before that street circles around the courthouse, US 412 Bus. joins a northbound concurrency with US 31 (North Garden Street). Beginning at Third Street, US 31/US 412 Bus. curves from straight north to northeast and after the intersection with Tennessee State Route 7 crosses a bridge over Duck River, then curves even more towards the northeast as it becomes the Nashville Highway, a standard four-lane divided commercial strip. US 412 Business ends at the northern terminus of US 43, while US 31 continues north along Tennessee State Route 6, as US 412/SR 99 continues east towards I-65.
