= George Webster House =

Historic house in Tennessee, United States

- U.S. National Register of Historic Places
- Location within Tennessee Location within the United States
- Nearest city: Williamsport, Tennessee
- Area: 13.8 acres (5.6 ha)
- Built: 1844
- Built by: George Pope Webster
- Architectural style: Federal
- NRHP reference No.: 84003646
- Added to NRHP: April 5, 1984

The George Webster House is a historic mansion in Williamsport, Tennessee, USA.

== History ==
The two-storey mansion was completed in 1844 for George Pope Webster. It was designed in the Federal architectural style. Webster was the owner of 75 African slaves.

The house was inherited by Mary Camp Webster and her husband, Hinton S. Frierson. It was later inherited by Adelaide Queener. It was purchased by Jane H. Babcock in 1980.

== Architectural significance ==
The house has been listed on the National Register of Historic Places since April 5, 1984.
