= Glen Oak (Nashville, Tennessee) =

Historic house in Tennessee, United States

- U.S. National Register of Historic Places
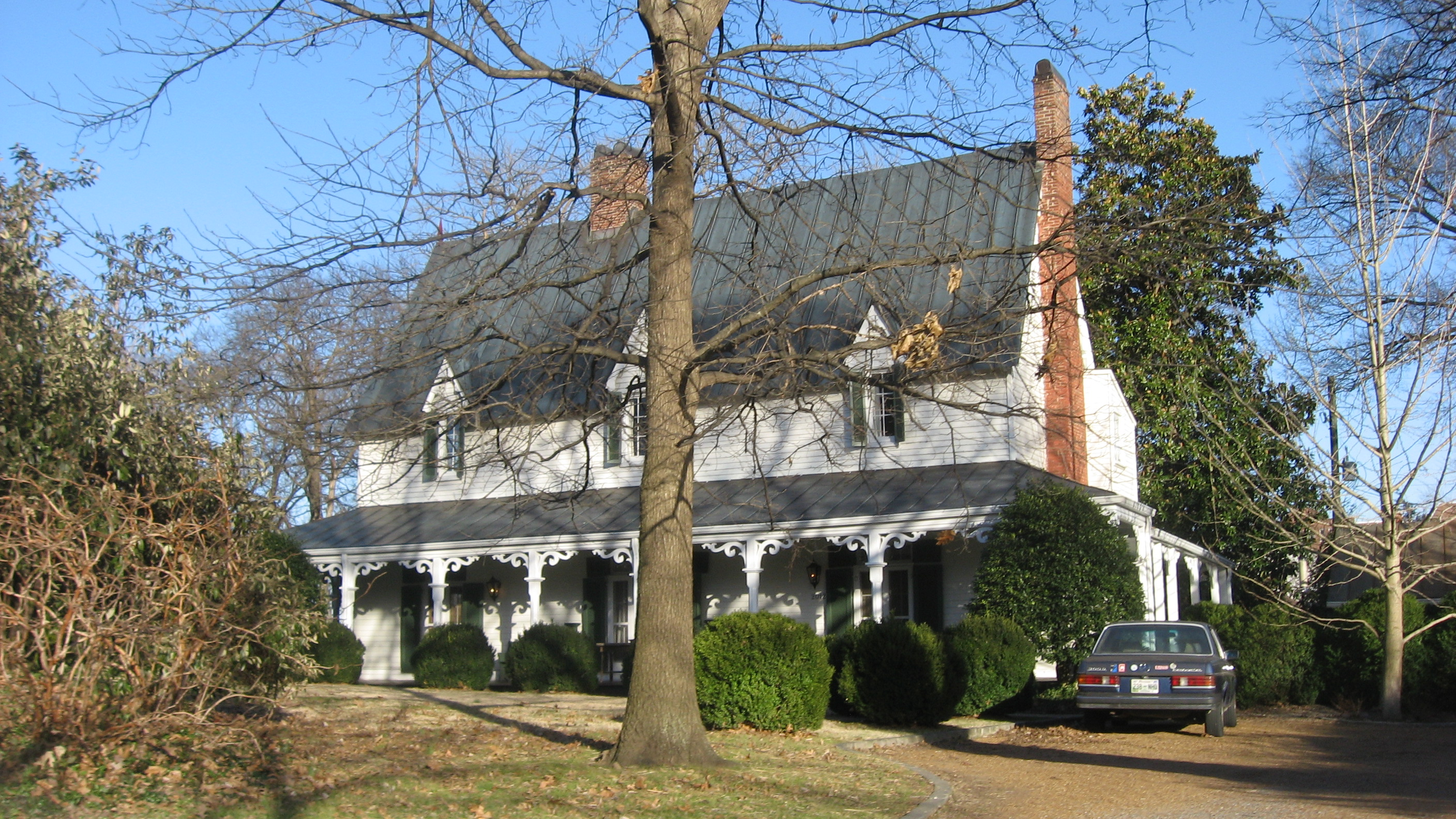
- Glen Oak in 2014

- Location within Tennessee
- Location: 2012 25th Avenue, South, Nashville, Tennessee
- Coordinates: 36°7′57″N 86°48′25″W
- Area: 0.5 acres (0.20 ha)
- Built: 1854
- Architectural style: Gothic Revival
- NRHP reference No.: 83004235
- Added to NRHP: November 17, 1983

Glen Oak is a historic mansion in Nashville, Tennessee, U.S..

== History ==
The house was built for English-born Reverend Charles Tomes and his wife Henrietta, the daughter of Bishop James Hervey Otey. Its construction was completed in 1854. Three years later, in 1857, it was purchased by Lizinka Campbell Brown, the daughter of Senator George W. Campbell.

In 1862, in the midst of the American Civil War of 1861–1865, the house was occupied by the Union Army. After the war, Brown had married Confederate General Richard S. Ewell in Richmond, Virginia, and they moved to Ewell Farm in Spring Hill, Tennessee.

The house was purchased by Edgar Jones, a banker, in 1867. With his neighbor, George Reid Calhoun, the brother of silversmith William Henry Calhoun, Jones decided to subdivide his land in 1911, and it became known as Hillsboro Village.

== Architectural significance ==
The house was designed in the Gothic Revival architectural style. It has been listed on the National Register of Historic Places since November 17, 1983.
