= Merritt H. Booker House =

Historic house in Tennessee, United States

- U.S. National Register of Historic Places
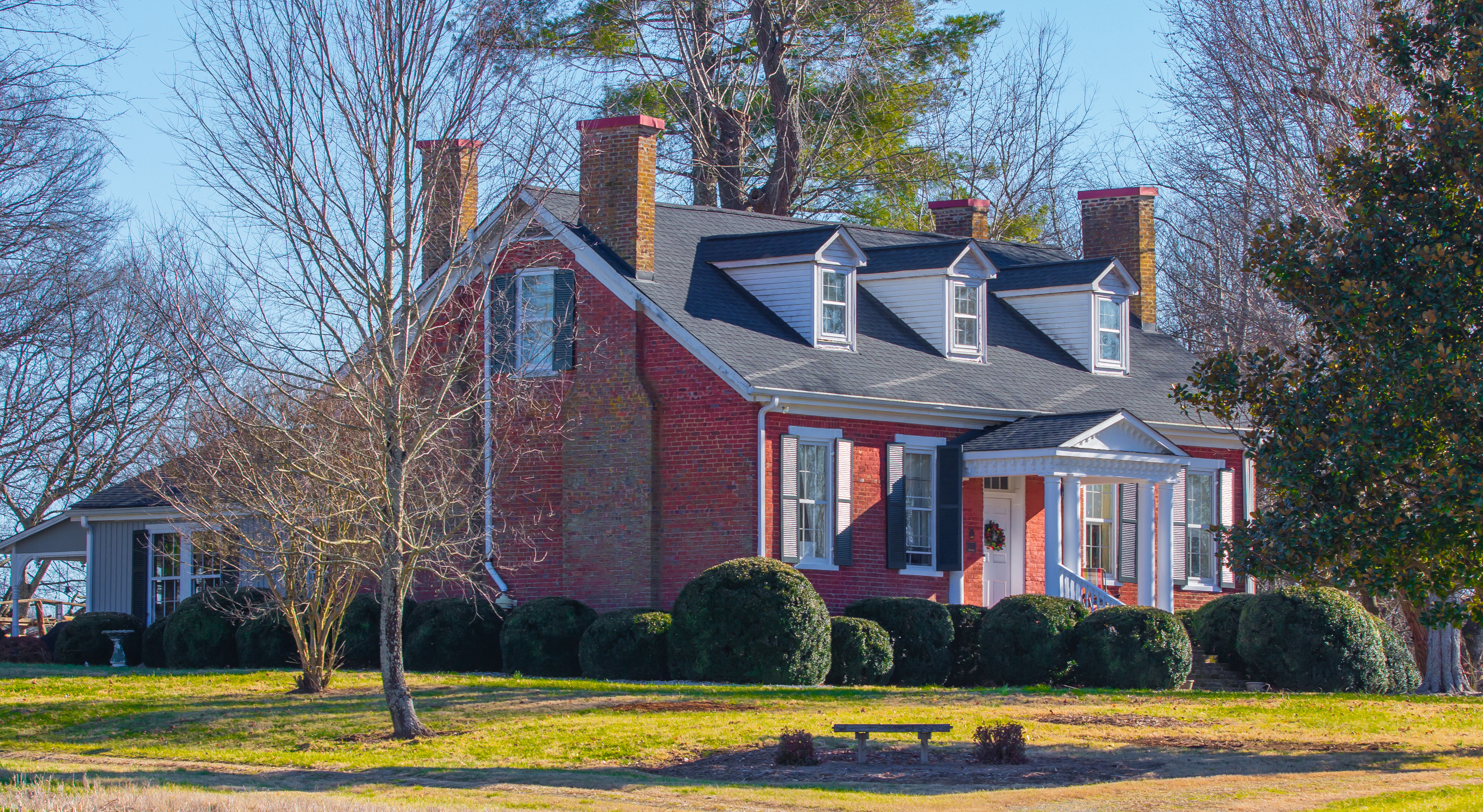

- Location within Tennessee Location within the United States
- Nearest city: Culleoka, Tennessee
- Coordinates: 35°28′15″N 87°0′33″W
- Area: 4 acres (1.6 ha)
- Built: 1828
- Built by: Merritt H. Booker
- Architectural style: Federal
- NRHP reference No.: 85001561
- Added to NRHP: July 18, 1985

The Merritt H. Booker House is a historic house in Culleoka, Tennessee, USA.

The house was completed in 1828 for Merrit H. Booker, a Virginia native. It was designed in the Federal architectural style.

In 1880, the house was purchased by Jonas Ingram. It was restored by his grandson, Dan Ingram, in 1963.

It was added to the National Register of Historic Places on July 18, 1985.
