= Derryberry =

Derryberry is a surname. Notable people with the surname include:

- Debi Derryberry (born 1960), American voice actress
- Elizabeth Derryberry, American ornithologist
- Larry Derryberry (1939–2016), American politician
- William Everett Derryberry (1906–1991) was an American football player and coach, and university president

== See also ==
- Alder & Derryberry A, American monoplane
- Derryberry House, also known as Pineview, mansion in Spring Hill, Tennessee, US
