= Vine Hill =

Vine Hill may refer to:

in the United States

(by state)

- Vine Hill, California
- Vine Hill (Centerville, North Carolina), listed on the NRHP in North Carolina
- Vine Hill (Cross Bridge, Tennessee), listed on the NRHP in Tennessee
