= Columbia Hydroelectric Station =

- U.S. National Register of Historic Places
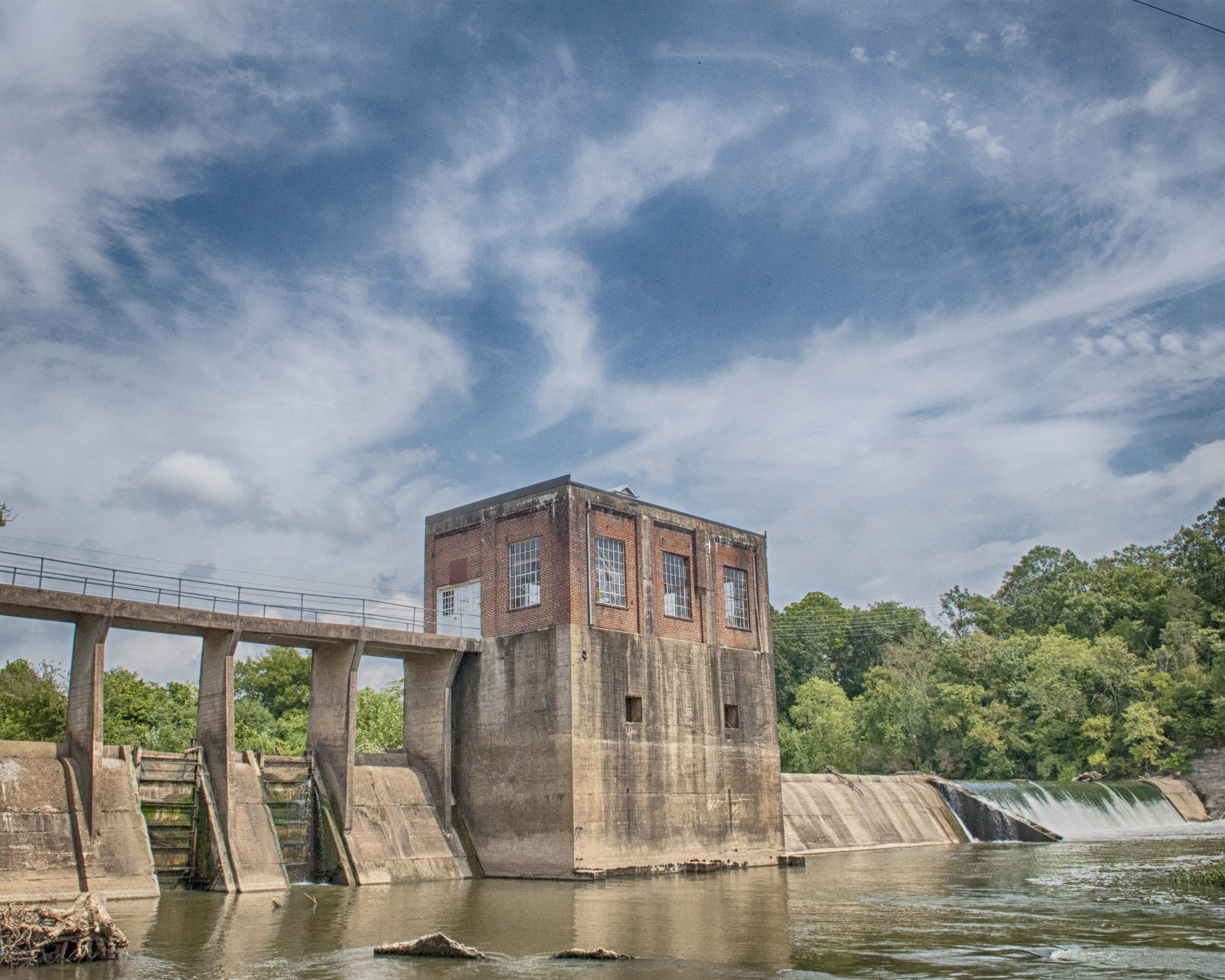
- The Columbia Hydroelectric Station in 2014

- Location within Tennessee Location within the United States
- Location: Riverwalk Park, Riverside Dr. and Duck River, Columbia, Tennessee
- Coordinates: 35°36′56″N 87°0′53″W
- Area: less than one acre
- Built: 1925
- Built by: Foster & Creighton
- Engineer: Freeland, Roberts & Co.
- MPS: Pre-TVA Hydroelectric Power Development in Tennessee MPS
- NRHP reference No.: 89002364
- Added to NRHP: February 9, 1990

The Columbia Hydroelectric Station is a hydroelectric station in Columbia, Tennessee, United States.

== History ==
The construction of the hydroelectric station was completed in 1925. It was designed by Freeland, Roberts and Co. and built by Foster & Creighton for the Southern Cities Corporation.

It has been listed on the National Register of Historic Places since February 9, 1990.
