= Mayes-Hutton House =

Historic house in Tennessee, United States

- U.S. National Register of Historic Places
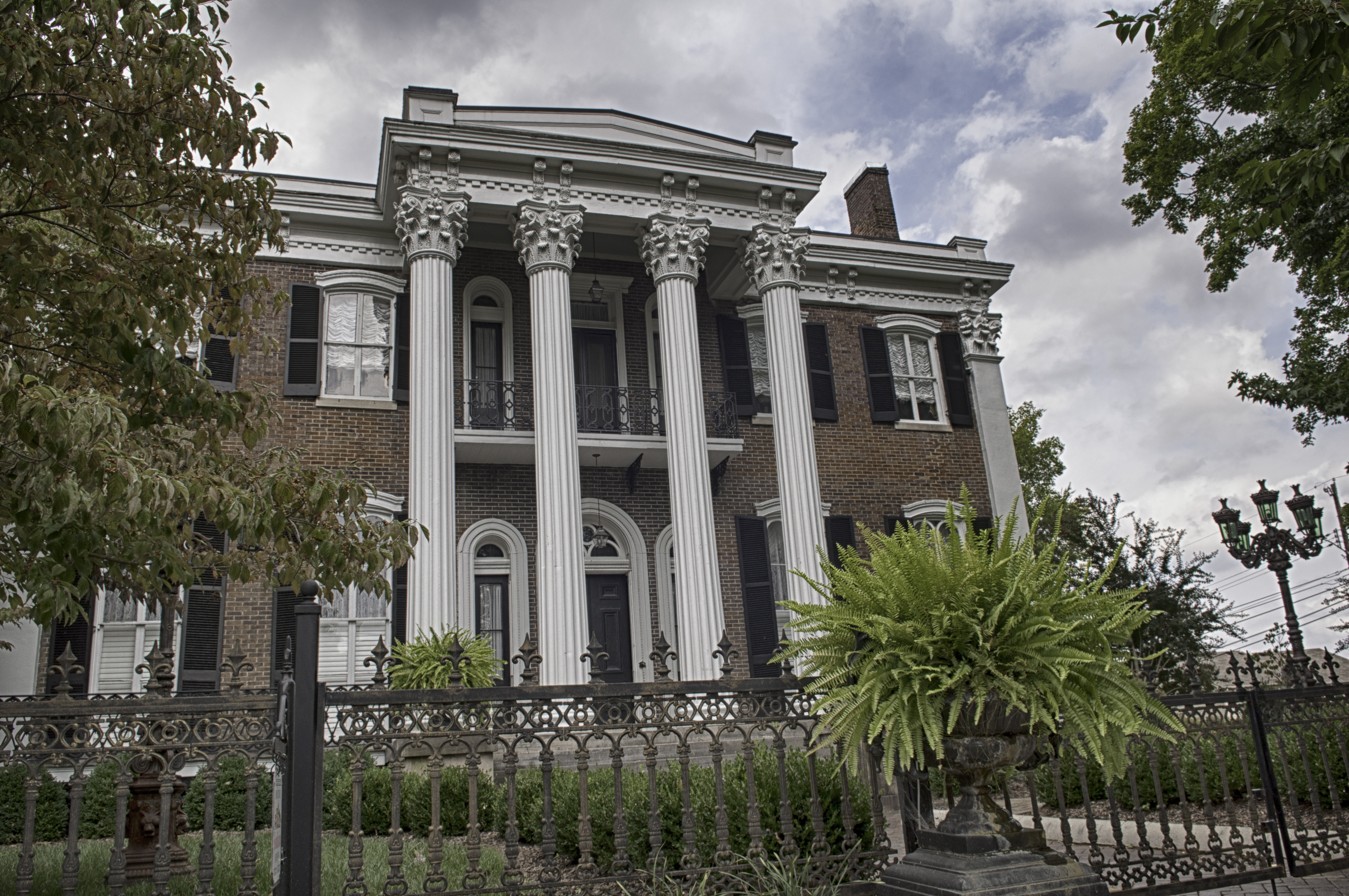
- The Mayes-Hutton House in 2014

- Location within Tennessee Location within the United States
- Location: 306 W. 6th St., Columbia, Tennessee
- Coordinates: 35°37′1″N 87°2′17″W
- Area: 9.9 acres (4.0 ha)
- Built: 1854
- Architectural style: Greek Revival
- NRHP reference No.: 70000614
- Added to NRHP: July 8, 1970

The Mayes-Hutton House is a historic house in Columbia, Maury County, Tennessee, USA.

== History ==
The house was built in 1854 for Samuel Mayes, who sold his slaves as he believed slavery would come to an end, and re-invested his money in this house.

== Architecture ==
The original portion of the house has a large 54 foot by 58 foot section with an 18 by 18 foot attached wing on the west of the back side. The brown brick house sits on a stucco-covered limestone foundation. The front of the house, probably heavily modified in the 1870s, includes four fluted Corinthian columns supporting a pediment, and a parapet, presenting a massive front facade. The interior is less ostentatious. but well designed, with a central hall that continues through the house, a free-standing stair, and balcony.

== Heritage significance ==
It was added to the National Register of Historic Places for its architectural qualities on July 8, 1970.
