= Jonathan Amis House =

Historic house in Tennessee, United States

- U.S. National Register of Historic Places
- Location within Tennessee Location within the United States
- Location: Covey Hollow Rd., McCains, Tennessee
- Coordinates: 35°29′27″N 87°2′43″W
- Area: 6.9 acres (2.8 ha)
- Built: 1857
- Built by: William J. Williams
- Architectural style: Greek Revival
- NRHP reference No.: 84003620
- Added to NRHP: April 26, 1984

The Jonathan Amis House is a historic house in McCains, Tennessee, USA.

== History ==
The land was granted to William Pillow in 1820. By 1837, he sold some of it to Jonathan Amis. The latter built this house with yellow poplar in 1857–1858. It was designed in the Greek Revival architectural style.

== Architectural significance ==
It has been listed on the National Register of Historic Places since April 26, 1984.
