= William Watkins House =

Historic house in Tennessee, United States

- U.S. National Register of Historic Places
- Location within Tennessee Location within the United States
- Nearest city: Mount Pleasant, Tennessee
- Coordinates: 35°33′53″N 87°11′39″W
- Area: 2 acres (0.81 ha)
- Built: 1830
- Architect: William Watkins
- Architectural style: Vernacular Federal
- NRHP reference No.: 86002901
- Added to NRHP: October 23, 1986

The William Watkins House, also known as the Sugar Bend Farm, is a historic house in Mount Pleasant, Tennessee, USA.

== History ==
The house was built in the early 1830s for William Watkins, a Virginia native. It was designed in the Federal architectural style. Watkins was the owner of six African slaves in 1836. At the outbreak of the American Civil War in 1861, he was "one of the largest slaveholders in Maury County."

It has been listed on the National Register of Historic Places since October 13, 1986.
