= Culleoka Methodist Episcopal Church, South =

Historic church in Tennessee, United States

- U.S. National Register of Historic Places
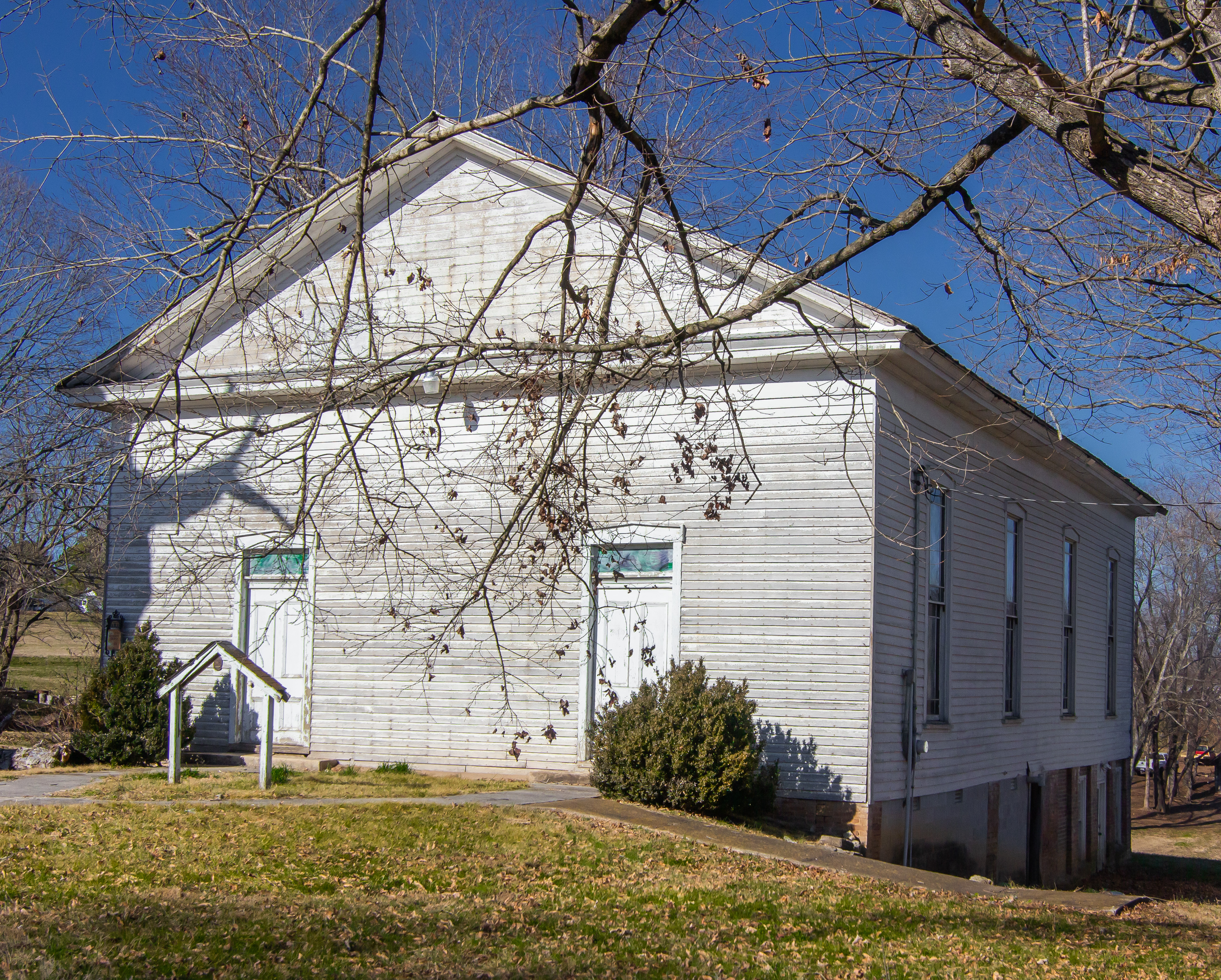

- Location within Tennessee Location within the United States
- Location: Quality St., Culleoka, Tennessee
- Coordinates: 35°28′53″N 86°59′6″W
- Area: less than one acre
- Built: 1868
- Architectural style: Greek Revival, Vernacular Greek Revival
- NRHP reference No.: 86001134
- Added to NRHP: May 22, 1986

Culleoka Methodist Episcopal Church, South is a historic church on Quality Street in Culleoka, Tennessee.

It was built in 1868. In 1870 it became the first location of what was to become the Webb School, when W. R. "Sawney" Webb and his brother taught classes in the church basement. The church was added to the National Register of Historic Places in 1986.
