= Cleburne Jersey Farm =

Historic house in Tennessee, United States

- U.S. National Register of Historic Places
- U.S. Historic district
- Location within Tennessee Location within the United States
- Nearest city: Spring Hill, Tennessee
- Area: 107 acres (43 ha)
- Built: 1872
- Architectural style: Italianate
- MPS: Historic Family Farms in Middle Tennessee MPS
- NRHP reference No.: 00001430
- Added to NRHP: November 22, 2000

Cleburne Jersey Farm is a historic farmhouse in Spring Hill, Tennessee, United States.

== History ==
The two-storey house was completed in 1872. It was built McCoy Campbell. It was named "Cleburne" in honor of General Patrick Cleburne, who served in the Confederate States Army during the American Civil War.

It was the second Jersey cattle farm in the United States.

== Architectural significance ==
The house has been listed on the National Register of Historic Places since November 22, 2000.
