= James Kennedy House =

Historic house in Tennessee, United States

- U.S. National Register of Historic Places
- Location within Tennessee Location within the United States
- Nearest city: Columbia, Tennessee
- Coordinates: 35°39′25″N 86°59′45″W
- Area: 1.9 acres (0.77 ha)
- Built: 1840
- Built by: James Kennedy
- Architectural style: Classical Revival, Greek Revival
- NRHP reference No.: 87001780
- Added to NRHP: November 6, 1987

The James Kennedy House, also known as the Seven Springs Farm, is a historic house in Columbia, Tennessee, United States.

== History ==
The house was completed in 1840 for James Kennedy, a Kentucky native. It was purchased by Flavius J. Ewing in 1870.

== Architectural significance ==
It has been listed on the National Register of Historic Places since November 6, 1987.
