= Lucius Frierson House =

Historic house in Tennessee, United States

- U.S. National Register of Historic Places
- Location within Tennessee Location within the United States
- Location: W. 7th St., Columbia, Tennessee
- Coordinates: 35°36′57″N 87°2′25″W
- Area: 0.5 acres (0.20 ha)
- Built: 1876
- Architectural style: Second Empire, Italianate
- NRHP reference No.: 78002610
- Added to NRHP: September 1, 1978

The Lucius Frierson House is a historic mansion in Columbia, Tennessee, USA.

== History ==
The house was completed in 1876. It was built for Lucius Frierson, a local businessman, and his wife, Sarah Catherine Morgan.

== Architectural significance ==
It has been listed on the National Register of Historic Places since September 1, 1978.
