= Dr. Samuel Mayes House =

Historic house in Tennessee, United States

- U.S. National Register of Historic Places
- Location within Tennessee Location within the United States
- Nearest city: Columbia, Tennessee
- Area: 13.9 acres (5.6 ha)
- Built: 1818
- Architectural style: Federal, Vernacular, I-house
- NRHP reference No.: 93000345
- Added to NRHP: October 25, 1993

The Dr Samuel Mayes House is a historic house in Columbia, Tennessee, USA.

== History ==
The house was built in 1818 for Dr. Samuel Mayes, a physician. It was designed in the Federal architectural style.

== Architectural significance ==
It has been listed on the National Register of Historic Places since October 25, 1993.
