= Beechlawn Advance and Retreat =

- U.S. National Register of Historic Places
- Location within Tennessee Location within the United States
- Nearest city: Columbia, Tennessee
- Coordinates: 35°34′08″N 87°02′32″W
- Area: 10.49 acres (4.25 ha)
- Built: 1853
- Architectural style: Greek Revival
- NRHP reference No.: 71000824
- Added to NRHP: May 14, 1971

The Beechlawn Advance and Retreat is a historic mansion in Columbia, Tennessee, U.S..

== History ==
The house was built as a house for A. W. Warfield in 1853. During the American Civil War of 1861–1865, Warfield served as a Major in the Confederate States Army. His wife remained in the house, and she let Confederate generals John Bell Hood and Nathan Bedford Forrest, and Union general John Schofield use it as army command on November 24, 1864, and December 20, 1864, respectively.

== Architectural significance ==
The house was designed in the Greek Revival architectural style. It has been listed on the National Register of Historic Places since May 14, 1971.
