= Mercer Hall =

Historic house in Tennessee, United States

- U.S. National Register of Historic Places
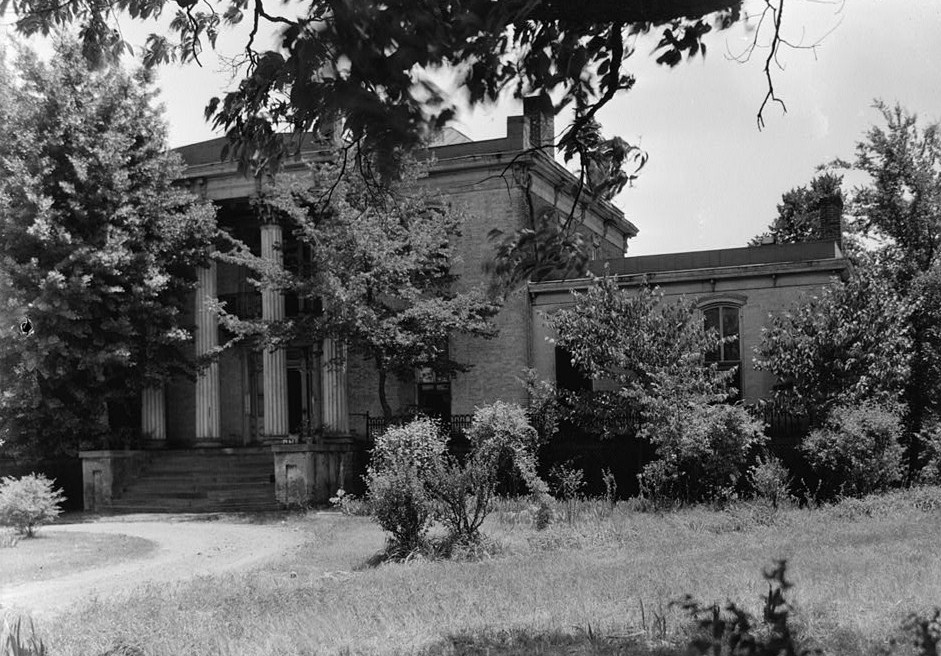
- Mercer Hall in 1936
- Built: 1838
- NRHP reference No.: 82001730
- Added to NRHP: December 16, 1982

Mercer Hall is a historic mansion in Columbia, Maury County, Tennessee, USA.

== History ==
The mansion was built in 1838 for William Leacock, an Episcopal pastor.

== Heritage significance ==
It has been listed on the National Register of Historic Places since December 16, 1982.
