= Prewitt-Amis-Finney House =

Historic house in Tennessee, United States

- Prewitt--Amis--Finney House
- U.S. National Register of Historic Places
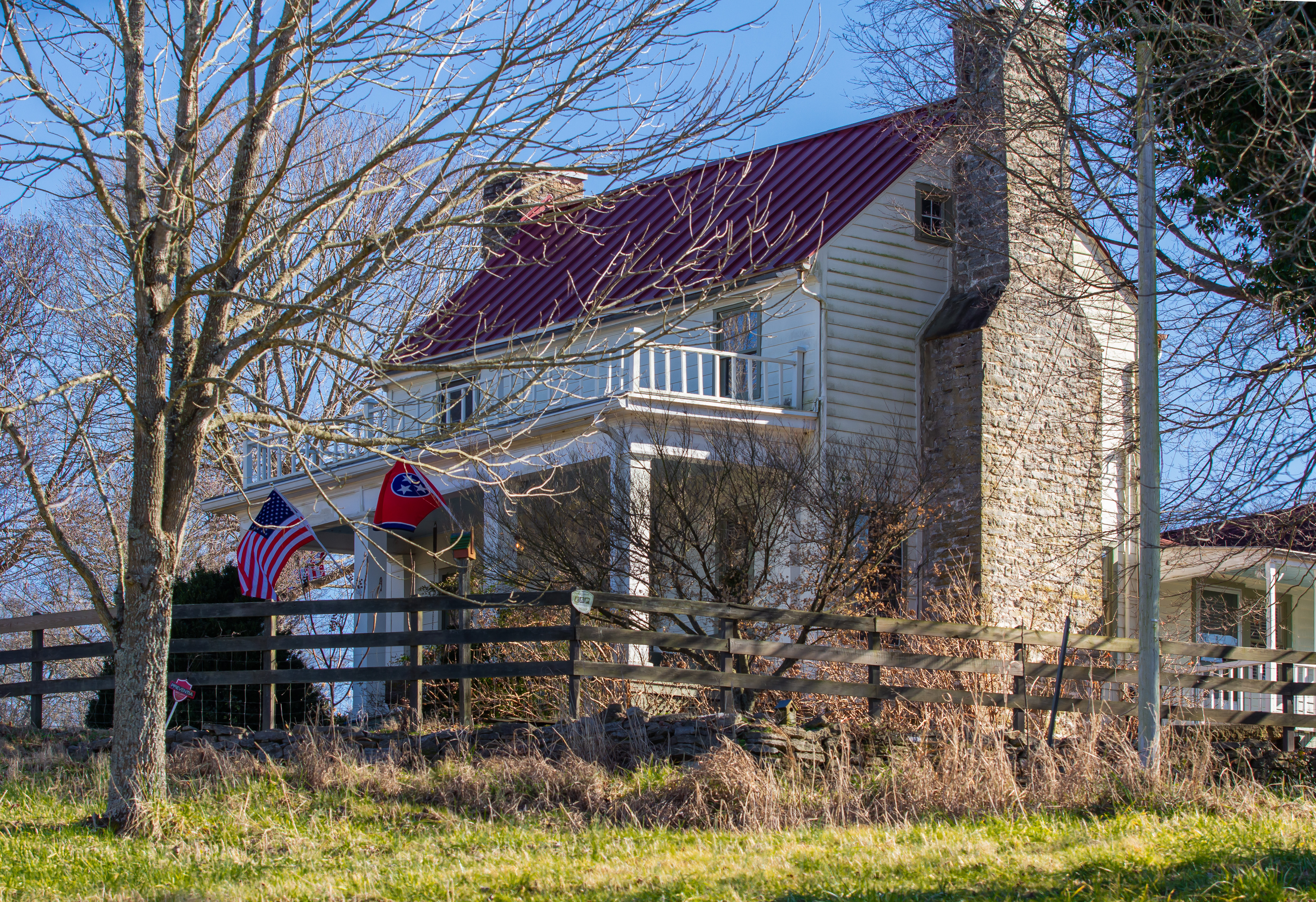
- Prewitt-Amis-Finney House

- Location within Tennessee
- Interactive map showing the location of Prewitt-Amis-Finney House
- Location: 2629 Pullen Mill Road, Culleoka, Tennessee
- Coordinates: 35°27′44″N 87°0′2″W
- Area: 92 acres (37 ha)
- Built: 1810
- Architectural style: Colonial Revival, Hall-and-Parlor
- NRHP reference No.: 97001503
- Added to NRHP: December 1, 1997

The Prewitt-Amis-Finney House, also known as Turnhill Farm, is a historic three-story house in Culleoka, Tennessee, U.S.. Built for the slaveholding Prewett family in 1810, it was established as a mule farm. It is located a few miles away from Columbia, and it overlooks Fountain Creek.

== History ==
The house was built in 1810 by Lemuel Prewett, his wife Elizabeth and their 12 children. The Prewett raised mules on their farm; they also owned African slaves. After the Creek War of 1813–1814, the house was inherited by Lemuel Prewett's son Abner, and the Prewetts moved to Mississippi in the 1820s.

The house was purchased by John Amis, his wife and their six children, in 1821. Amis, the owner of 16 slaves, served on the county court. In 1852, he died of cholera alongside his wife and his son John; the three of them were buried on the farm. The house was inherited by their daughter, Elizabeth Amis Cheatham, and her husband, John Cheatham.

The house was purchased by James I. Finney, Sr. in 1935. He redesigned it in the Colonial Revival architectural style, and he renamed it Turnhill Farm.

The house has been listed on the National Register of Historic Places since December 1, 1997.
