= Patrick Maguire House =

Historic house in Tennessee, United States

- U.S. National Register of Historic Places
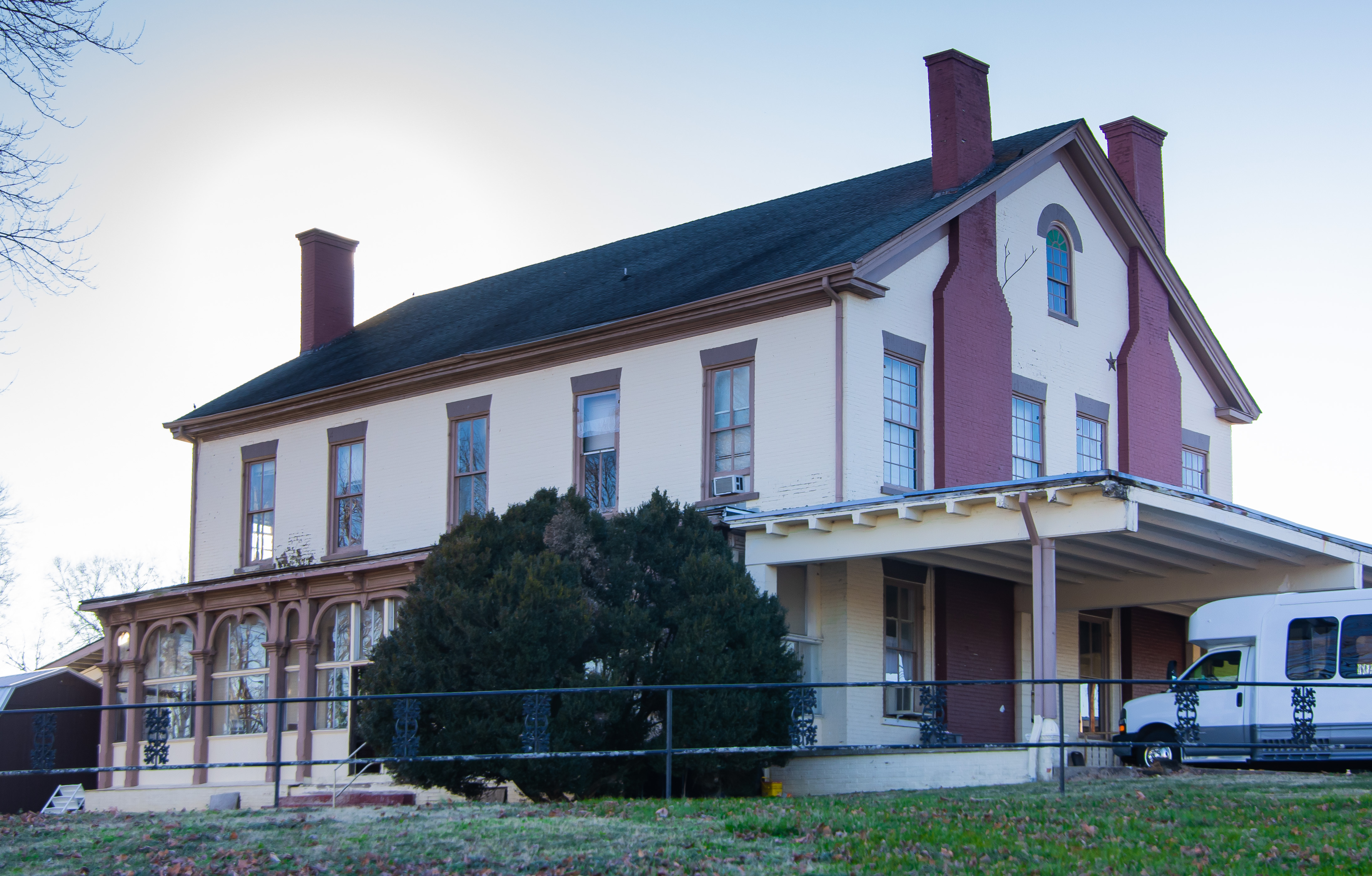
- Patrick Maguire House

- Location within Tennessee Location within the United States
- Location: 105 N. Campbell Blvd., Columbia, Tennessee
- Coordinates: 35°37′34″N 87°2′28″W
- Area: 3.3 acres (1.3 ha)
- Built: 1830
- Architectural style: Federal
- NRHP reference No.: 83004270
- Added to NRHP: December 15, 1983

The Patrick Maguire House is a historic house in Columbia, Tennessee, USA.

== History ==
The two-storey house was completed in 1830. It was designed in the Federal architectural style. It was built for Patrick Maguire, an Irish immigrant. In 1849, President James K. Polk had dinner in this house.

== Architectural significance ==
The Patrick Maguire illustrates the early adoption of nationally emerging architectural forms in Tennessee before the rise of Greek Revival design. It has been listed on the National Register of Historic Places since December 15, 1983.
