= Ritter-Morton House =

Historic house in Tennessee, United States

- U.S. National Register of Historic Places
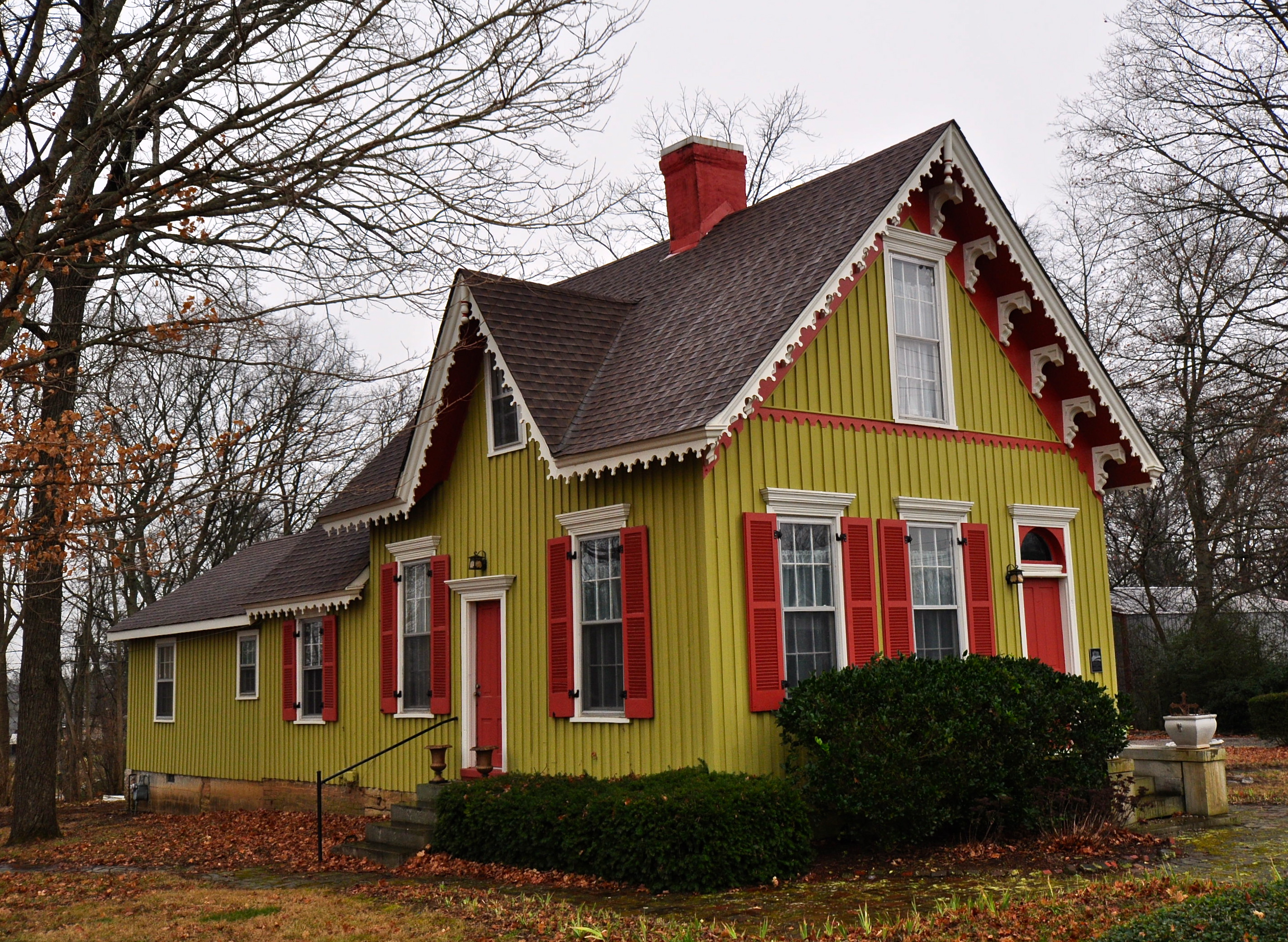
- The Ritter-Morton House in 2013

- Location within Tennessee
- Location: McLemore Avenue, Spring Hill, Tennessee
- Coordinates: 35°45′2″N 86°55′45″W
- Area: 1 acre (0.40 ha)
- Built: 1878
- Architectural style: Gothic, Carpenter Gothic
- NRHP reference No.: 76001790
- Added to NRHP: December 12, 1976

The Ritter-Morton House is a historic two-story house in Spring Hill, Tennessee, U.S..

== History ==
The Ritter-Morton house was built in 1878 for Peter Ritter and his wife, Elizabeth. It was designed in the Carpenter Gothic architectural style. It was acquired by John C. Witt on March 1, 1886. By January 1899, it was purchased by A. P. Odil.

The house has been listed on the National Register of Historic Places since December 12, 1976.
