= Skipwith Hall (Tennessee) =

Historic house in Tennessee, United States

- U.S. National Register of Historic Places
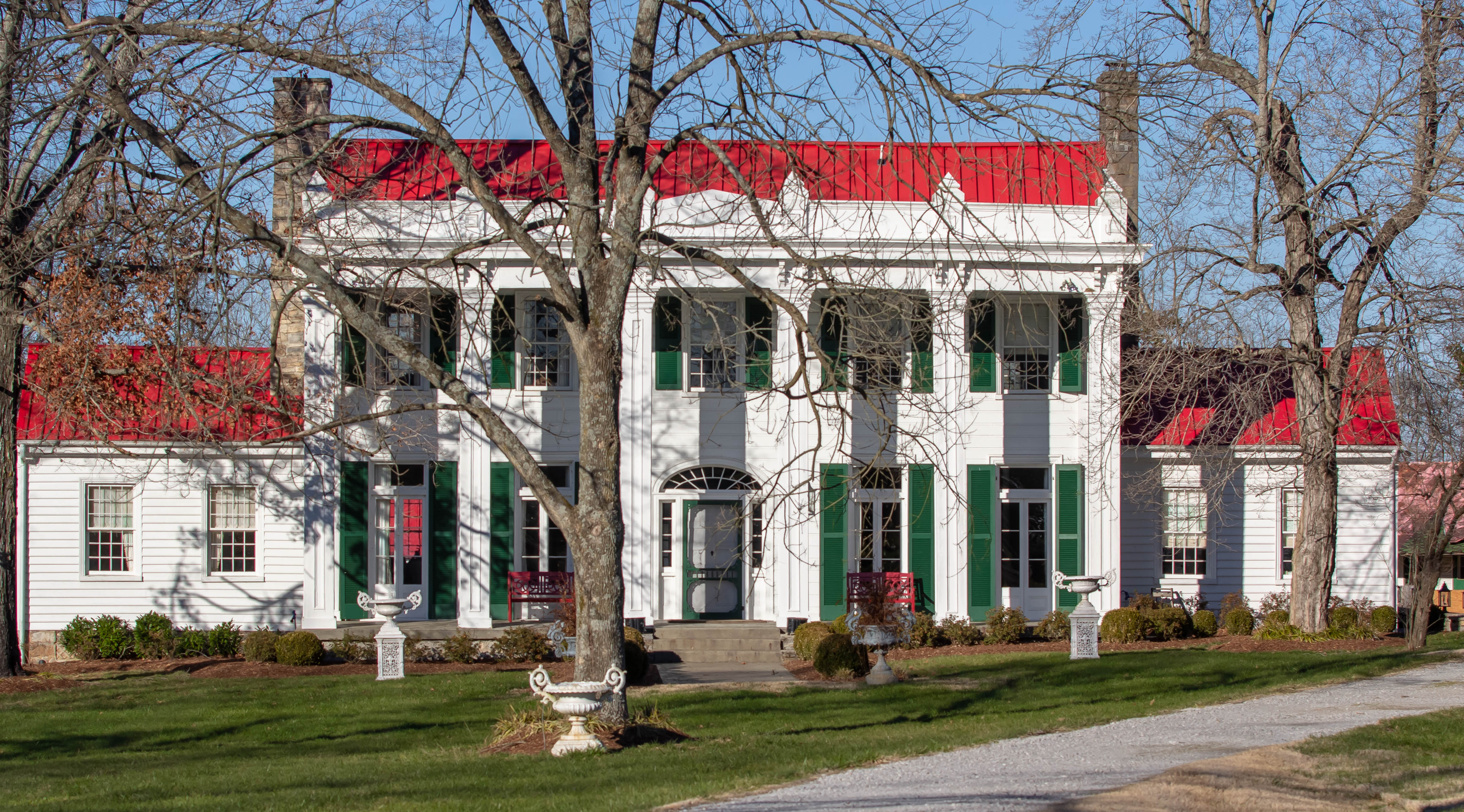
- Skipwith Hall

- Location within Tennessee Location within the United States
- Location: Columbia, Tennessee, U.S.
- Coordinates: 35.6410°N 87.1416°W
- Area: 13 acres (5.3 ha)
- Built: 1815-1816
- NRHP reference No.: 77001283
- Added to NRHP: November 23, 1978

Skipwith Hall, also known as Skipwith Place, Oakwood Farm, Skipwith Harlan Hill, and Oakwood Hall, is a former plantation and plantation house located in Maury County, Tennessee. It was initially built by Edward Brinley Littlefield and Cornelia Lott Skipwith (née Greene) as their residence.

It has been listed on the National Register of Historic Places since November 23, 1978, for architectural significance.

== History ==
=== Littlefield and Skipwith family ===
The 25,000-acre land was granted by George Washington to war general Nathanael Greene in 1807. Greene let his brother-in-law, Captain William Littlefield, settle the land. Skipwith Hall was once a 950-acre farm.

When Littlefield's son, Newport, Rhode Island-native, Edward Brinley Littlefield, married Greene's daughter, Cornelia Lott Greene, recently widow of Peyton Skipwith (c.1779–1808, third child of Sir Peyton Skipwith, 7th Baronet), the new couple decided to build a mansion for their plantation. The mansion was built with timber in 1815–1816. It was home to the first piano in Maury County and had the first "coffin room”, where they displayed each of the personal family coffins.

Edward lost the property, when he won Lucius J. Polk's seat in the Tennessee Senate, Littlefield moved to Nashville and left the mansion to his stepsons, George Greene Skipwith (1803–1852) and Peyton Horatio Skipwith (1805–1898). They formally inherited the site in 1836. By 1849, George Greene Skipwith passed the property on to the Planters Bank through a deed of trust.

=== Harlan family ===
Shortly after, the bank sold it to Benjamin Harlan. Harlan renamed it Oakwood Farm and turned it into a stock farm, importing stock from Spain and selling it in the south. Harlan hired architect Nathan Vaught to redesign the mansion. Vaught added "six white pillars and a grand veranda." According to local historian Reid Smith, Harlan added his "own special trademark of hospitality" with "A little Negro slave boy [who], stationed in the shade of a mighty oak along the pike, stood ever ready with a drink of spring water for each and every passerby."

The property was later inherited by Harlan's descendants, who were still the owners of the mansion in the 1970s.

== See also ==
- Prestwould, the Skipwith family plantation and plantation house in Virginia
