= Webster Farm =

- U.S. National Register of Historic Places
- U.S. Historic district
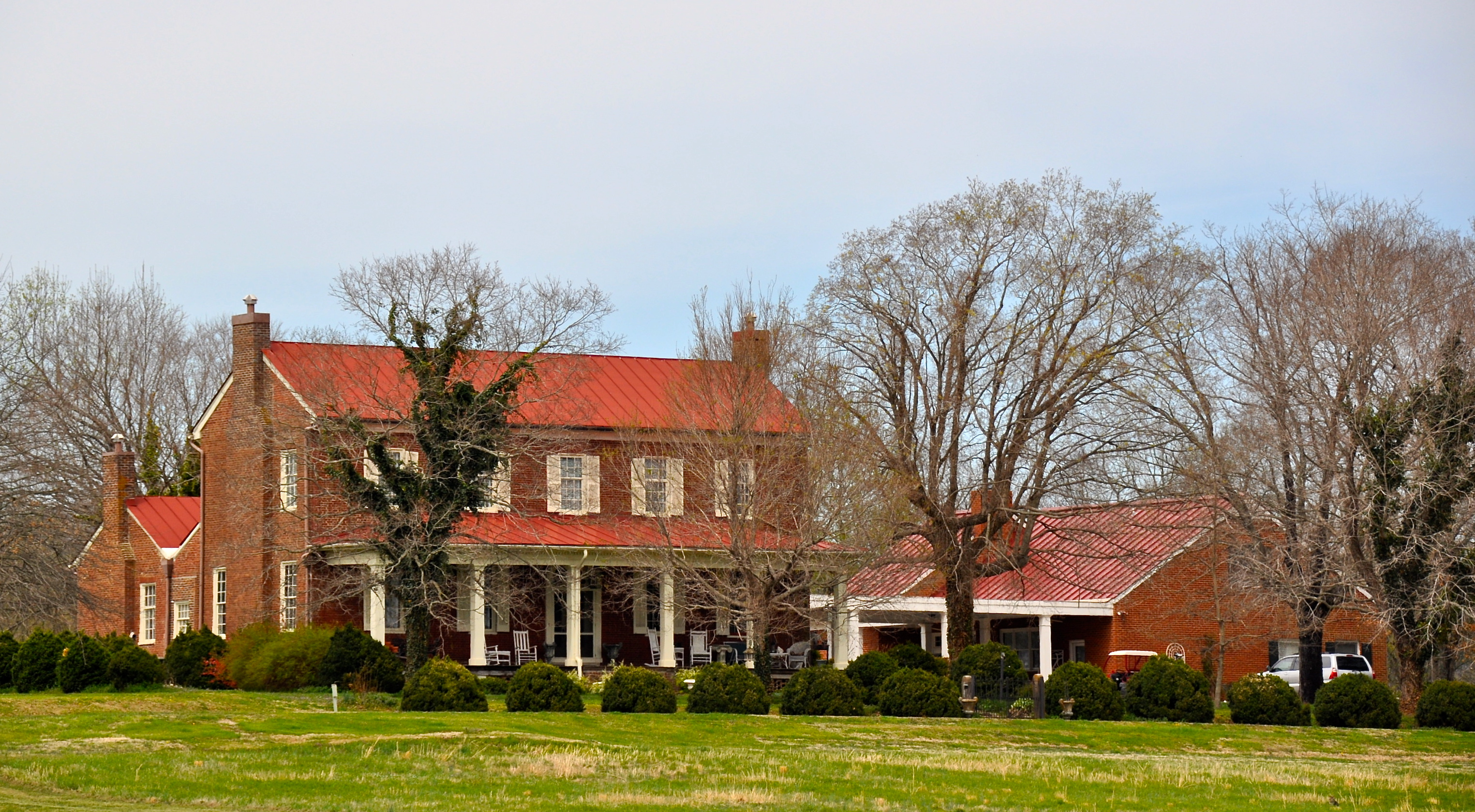
- The Webster Farm house in 2014

- Location within Tennessee Location within the United States
- Nearest city: Cross Bridges, Tennessee
- Area: 96.5 acres (39.1 ha)
- Built: 1810
- Architectural style: Federal
- MPS: Historic Family Farms in Middle Tennessee MPS
- NRHP reference No.: 96000770
- Added to NRHP: July 19, 1996

Webster Farm is a historic farmhouse in Cross Bridges, Tennessee, USA.

== History ==
The two-storey farmhouse was completed circa 1826. It was designed in the Federal architectural style.

== Architectural significance ==
It has been listed on the National Register of Historic Places since July 19, 1996.
