= Andrew Scott House =

Historic house in Tennessee, United States

- U.S. National Register of Historic Places
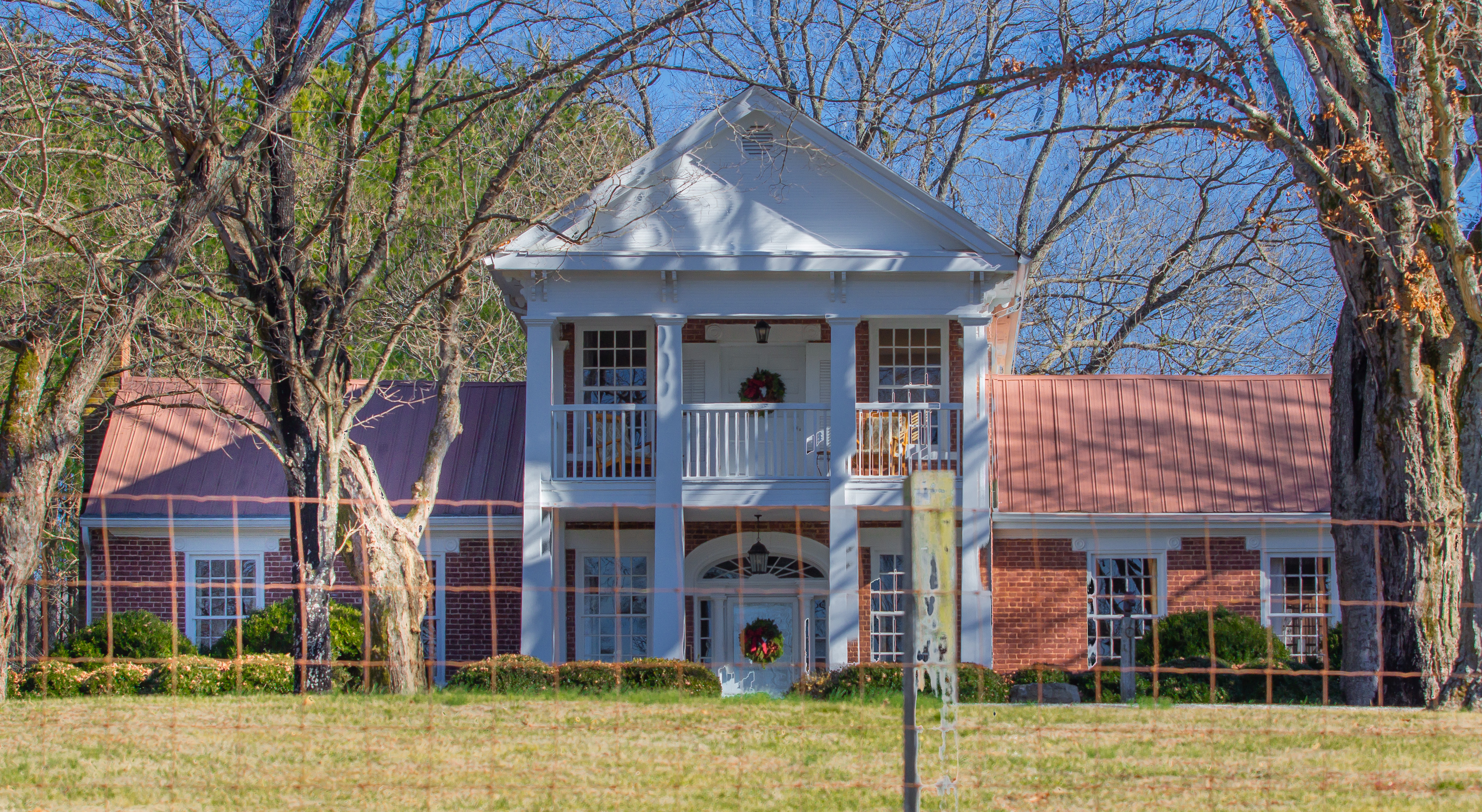

- Location within Tennessee
- Location: 3991 Pulaski Highway, Culleoka, Tennessee
- Coordinates: 35°27′57″N 87°2′31″W
- Area: 3 acres (1.2 ha)
- Built: 1820
- Architectural style: Georgian, Palladian
- NRHP reference No.: 95000976
- Added to NRHP: August 4, 1995

The Andrew Scott House is a historic two-story farmhouse in Culleoka, Tennessee, U.S.

== History ==
The house was built circa 1820 for Andrew Scott and his wife, Mary Doak Matthews. It was designed in the Georgian architectural style, with touches of Palladian architecture. After Andrew Scott's death in 1870, it was inherited by his son, Robert Miles Scott, who lived in the house with his wife, Sarah M. Walker, and their nine children. It became a horse farm.

After Robert M. Scott's 1897 death, it was purchased by J. T. Petty. By January 1939, it was purchased by Allan Matthews and his wife Mary. It was inherited by her nephew, Elliott Matthews, in 1978, and purchased by Philip M. Wendts in 1991.

The house has been listed on the National Register of Historic Places since August 4, 1995.
