= Rally Hill =

- U.S. National Register of Historic Places
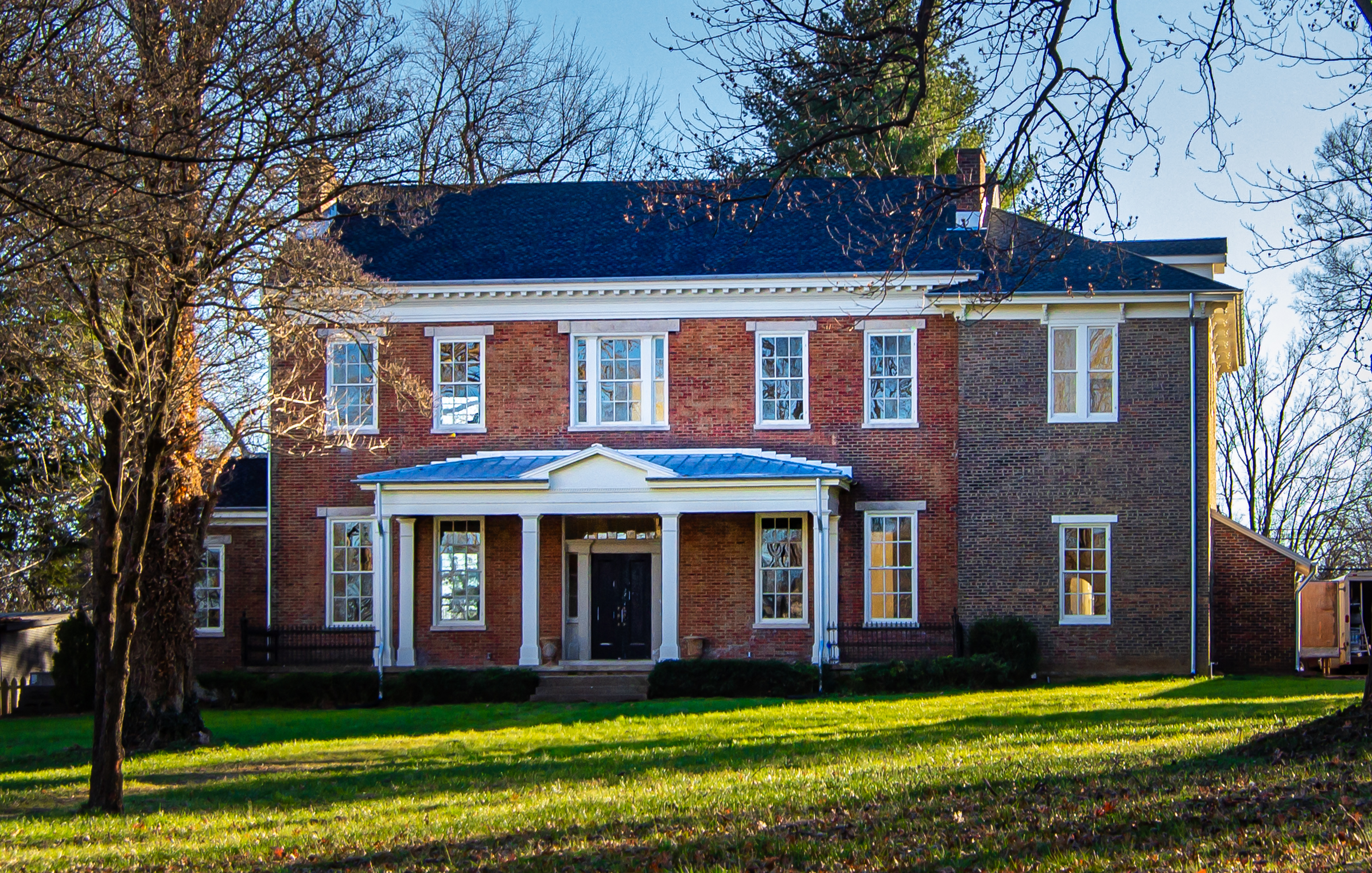
- Rally Hill

- Location within Tennessee Location within the United States
- Location: 319 W. 8th St., Columbia, Tennessee
- Coordinates: 35°36′48″N 87°02′20″W
- Area: 1.6 acres (0.65 ha)
- Built: c. 1830
- Architectural style: Federal
- NRHP reference No.: 84003638
- Added to NRHP: August 16, 1984

Rally Hill is a historic mansion in Columbia, Tennessee, U.S.. It has been listed on the National Register of Historic Places since August 16, 1984.

== History ==
The house was built c. 1848 for James Walker, President James K. Polk's brother-in-law. Walker was the publisher of The Western Chronicle, a Columbia newspaper, and chancellor of Maury County. Walker lived in the house with his wife, née Jane Maria Polk, and their three sons, including Lucius M. Walker, who served as a general in the Confederate States Army during the American Civil War.

From 1900 to 1912, the house belonged to William M. Biddle, a physician who served as the mayor of Columbia.

== Architecture ==
It is a two-and-a-half-story house and claimed to be designed in a transitional style between Federal and Greek Revival architectural styles by late 20th century sources. However, what remains of the original house bares no indication of Greek Revival influences; the house, with a plain brick facade, large pocket doors, and simple interior trim work, is strictly federal in appearance.

== Renovations ==
Rally Hill was partitioned into apartments then cheaply retrofitted for commercial use. A proper renovation that restored the home to its original federal appearance was completed in 2022.
