= Ewell Farm =

- U.S. National Register of Historic Places
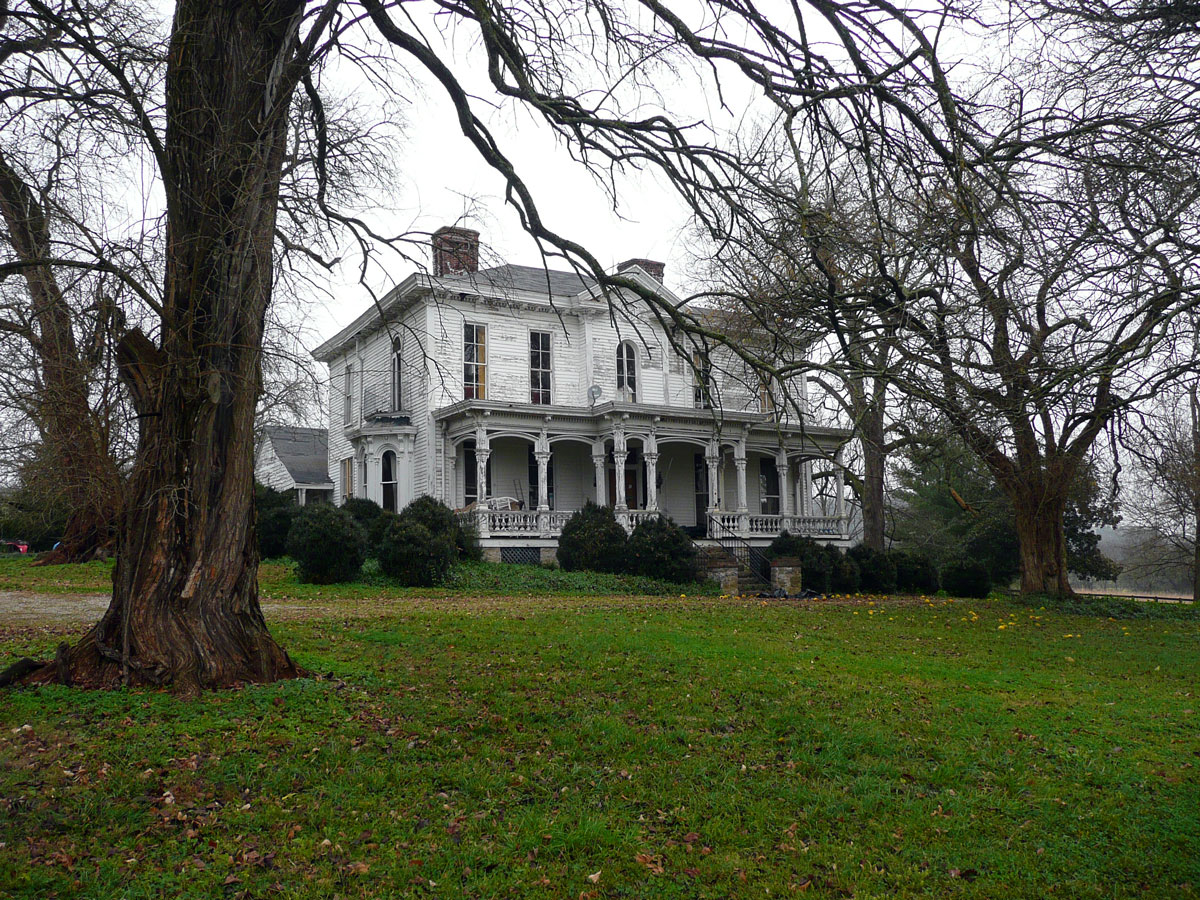
- The Ewell Farm in 2009

- Location within Tennessee Location within the United States
- Location: Depot Lane, Spring Hill, Tennessee
- Coordinates: 35.760556°N 86.943611°W
- Area: 28 acres (11 ha)
- Built: 1867
- Architectural style: Italianate
- NRHP reference No.: 76001788
- Added to NRHP: May 24, 1976

The Ewell Farm is a historic farmhouse in Spring Hill, Tennessee, United States.

== History ==
The two-story farmhouse was built in 1867. It was the residence of General Richard S. Ewell, who served in the Confederate States Army during the American Civil War, and his wife, George W. Campbell's daughter. The farm was used for raising cattle and sheep.

== Significance ==
The farmhouse has been listed on the National Register of Historic Places since May 24, 1976.
