= Blythewood (Columbia, Tennessee) =

Historic house in Tennessee, United States

- U.S. National Register of Historic Places
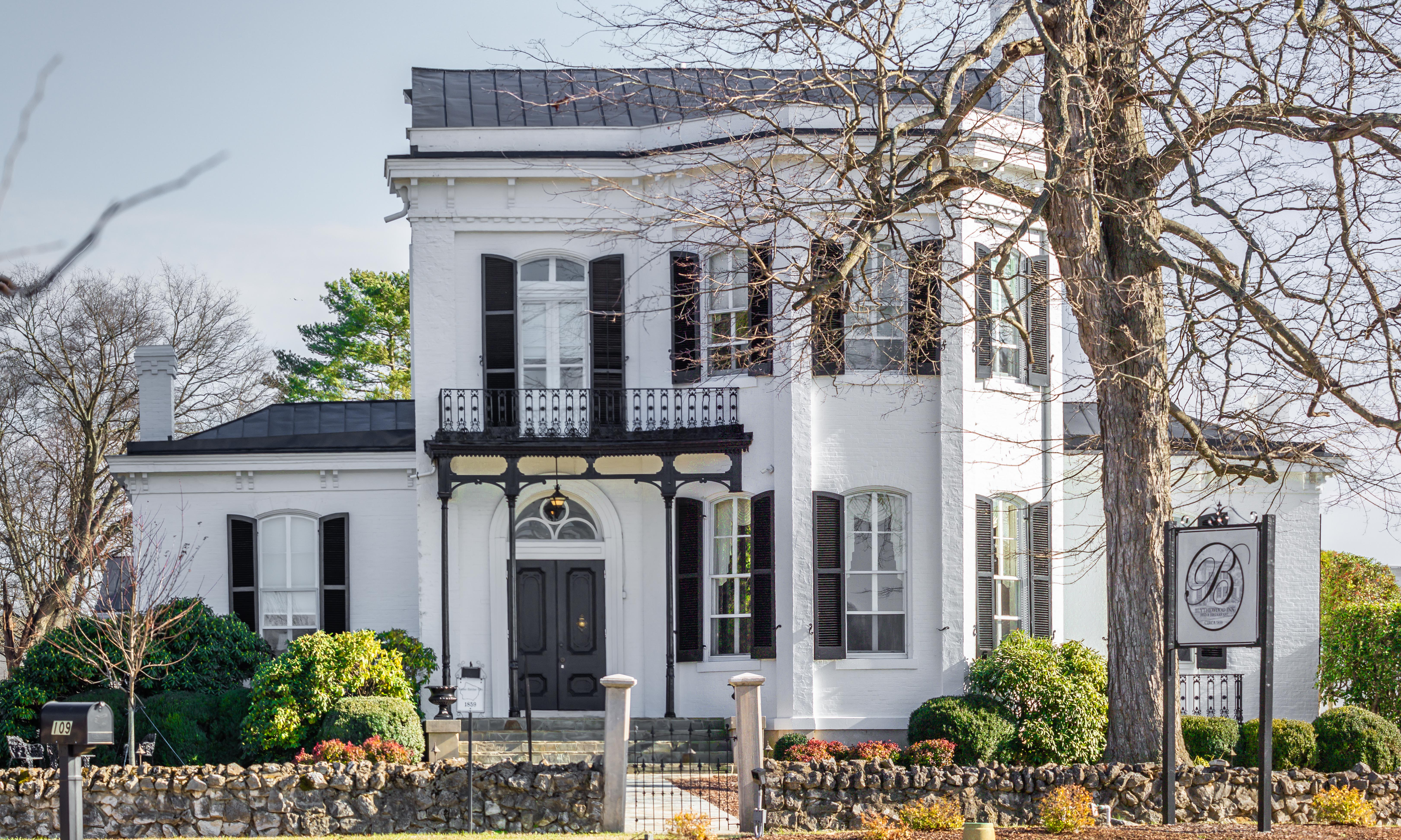
- Blythewood

- Location within Tennessee Location within the United States
- Interactive map showing the location of Blythewood
- Location: Trotwood and Hatcher Lane, Columbia, Tennessee
- Coordinates: 35°36′17.8″N 87°3′49.5″W
- Area: 9 acres (3.6 ha)
- Built: 1859
- Architectural style: Colonial, French Colonial
- NRHP reference No.: 73001810
- Added to NRHP: April 11, 1973

Blythewood is a historic house in Columbia, Maury County, Tennessee, United States.

== History ==
The house was built in the Antebellum Era for Thomas Keesee, a carriage maker. Completed c. 1859, the house is in the French Colonial style, unusual for this part of Tennessee.

During the American Civil War of 1861–1865, it belonged to the Wilson family. It was later acquired by Colonel P. C. Bethell, followed by Colonel R. E. Rivers, and finally by Colonel E. H. Hatcher.

== Heritage significance ==
It has been listed on the National Register of Historic Places since April 11, 1973.
