= Columbia Arsenal =

- U.S. National Register of Historic Places
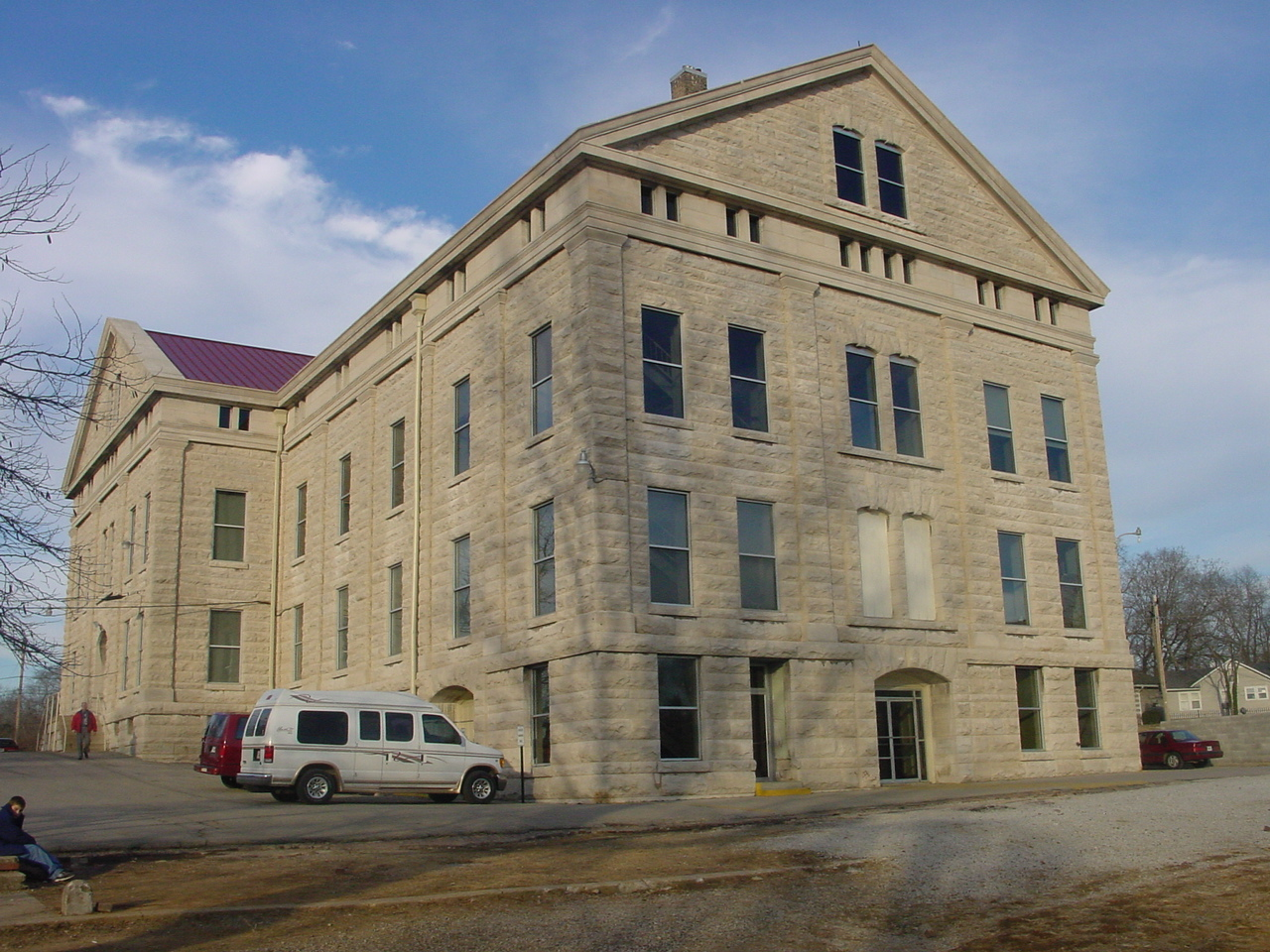
- The Columbia Arsenal in 2001

- Location within Tennessee Location within the United States
- Location: W. 7th St., Columbia, Tennessee
- Area: 67 acres (27 ha)
- Built: 1891
- Built by: Frank Goodwin
- Architectural style: Colonial Revival, Romanesque, Georgian Revival
- NRHP reference No.: 77001281
- Added to NRHP: September 19, 1977

The Columbia Arsenal, also known as the Columbia Military Academy, comprises nine historic buildings in Columbia, Tennessee, United States.

== History ==
The nine buildings of the Columbia Arsenal were built from 1890 to 1891 by the United States federal government.

== Architectural significance ==
The buildings were listed on the National Register of Historic Places in 1977.
