= Vine Hill (Cross Bridge, Tennessee) =

Historic house in Tennessee, United States

- U.S. National Register of Historic Places
- Location within Tennessee Location within the United States
- Nearest city: Cross Bridges, Tennessee
- Area: 29.5 acres (11.9 ha)
- Built: 1836
- Architectural style: Greek Revival
- NRHP reference No.: 83003053
- Added to NRHP: July 15, 1983

Vine Hill is a historic house in Cross Bridges, Tennessee, USA.

== History ==
The house was built in 1836 for James Henry Webster, the first white man born in Maury County after the county was created. It was designed in the Greek Revival architectural style. He grew cotton and wheat and raised thoroughbreds and mules.

== Architectural significance ==
It has been listed on the National Register of Historic Places since July 15, 1983.
