= Polk Sisters' House =

Historic house in Tennessee, United States

- U.S. National Register of Historic Places
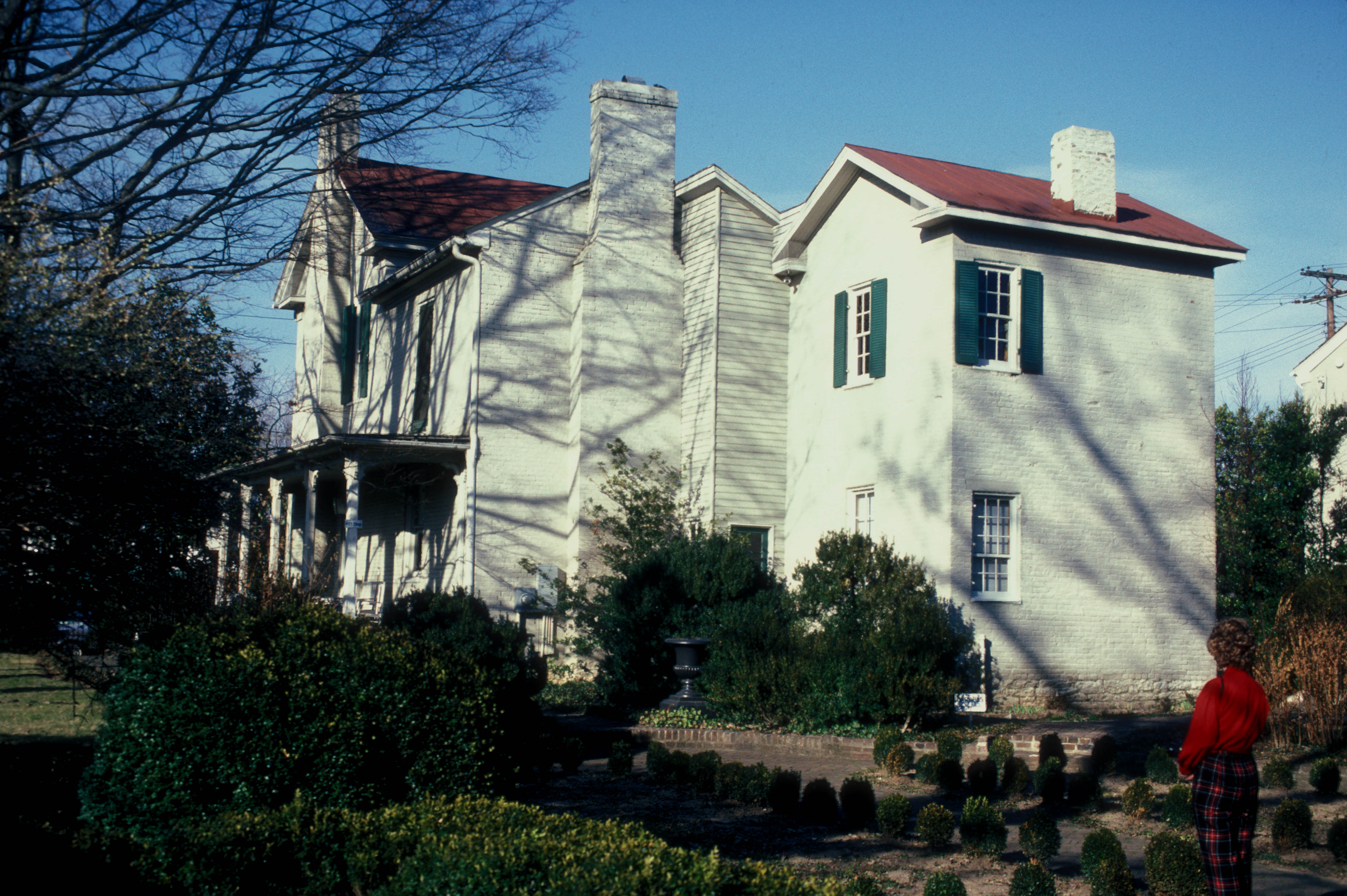

- Location within Tennessee Location within the United States
- Location: 305 W. 7th St., Columbia, Tennessee
- Coordinates: 35°36′54″N 87°2′16″W
- Area: 2 acres (0.81 ha)
- Built: 1818
- Architect: Purcell, James
- Architectural style: Federal
- NRHP reference No.: 75001770
- Added to NRHP: May 21, 1975

The Polk Sisters' House is a historic house in Columbia, Tennessee, that was the home of two sisters of U.S. President James K. Polk.

== History ==
The Polk Sisters' House was built in 1818 by Samuel Polk for his oldest daughter Jane Maria Polk Walker, she lived in the home until her eleventh child. Rally Hill would then be constructed for her family. Ophelia Polk Hayes would move into the home after her older sister moved.

Ophelia Polk Hayes was born September, 6 1812 in Maury County, and married Dr. John B. Hayes on September, 25 1829 in Columbia, TN. She died on April 18, 1850. The Hays/Hayes family has lived in middle Tennessee since moving from Virginia (following the Revolutionary War).

The Polk Sisters' House is next door to the James K. Polk Home and houses its visitors' center, museum room, and gift shop.
