= Derryberry House =

Historic house in Tennessee, United States

- Formerly listed on the U.S. National Register of Historic Places
- Location within Tennessee Location within the United States
- Nearest city: Spring Hill, Tennessee
- Area: 23 acres (9.3 ha)
- Built: 1803
- Built by: Adam and Jacob Derryberry
- Architectural style: Greek Revival, Hall and parlor
- NRHP reference No.: 90001656

Significant dates
- Added to NRHP: November 7, 1990
- Removed from NRHP: June 10, 2022

The Derryberry House, also known as Pineview, is a historic mansion in Spring Hill, Tennessee, USA.

== History ==
The two-storey mansion was completed in 1803. It was built for Adam Derryberry and his son Jacob. Later, it was redesigned in the Greek Revival architectural style. By the 1990s, the mansion still belonged to Derryberry's descendants.

== Architectural significance ==
It was listed on the National Register of Historic Places in 1990, and was delisted in 2022.
