= St. Mark United Primitive Baptist Church =

Historic church in Tennessee, United States

- U.S. National Register of Historic Places
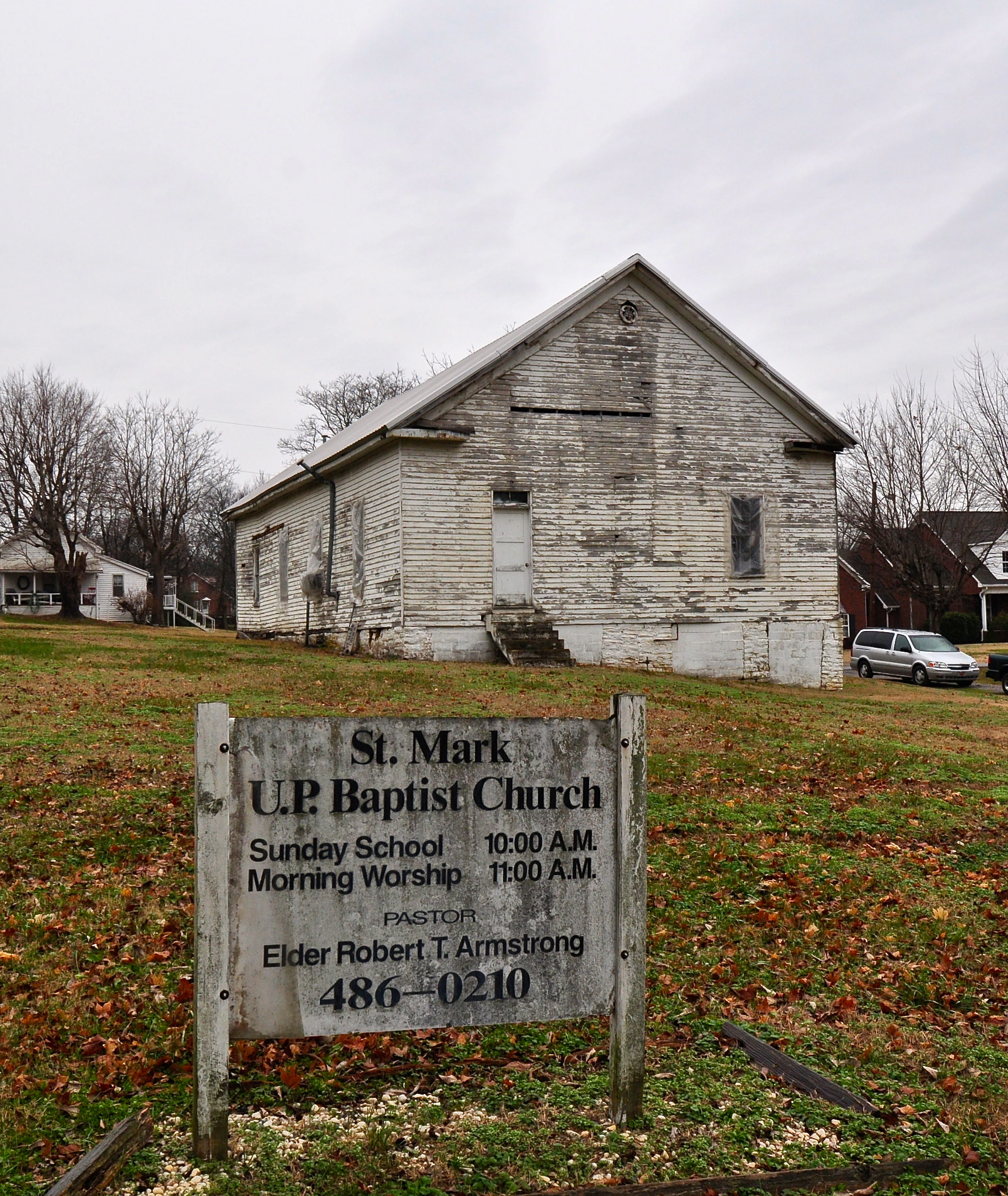
- St. Mark United Primitive Baptist Church, December 2013.

- Location within Tennessee Location within the United States
- Location: Maury Hill St., Spring Hill, Tennessee
- Coordinates: 35°45′1″N 86°55′58″W
- Area: less than one acre
- Built: 1900
- MPS: Rural African-American Churches in Tennessee MPS
- NRHP reference No.: 00000811
- Added to NRHP: July 14, 2000

St. Mark United Primitive Baptist Church is a historic Primitive Baptist church on Maury Hill Street in Spring Hill, Tennessee, United States. It was built in 1900 and added to the National Register of Historic Places in 2000.
