= Blythewood (Amite City, Louisiana) =

Historic house in Louisiana, United States

- U.S. National Register of Historic Places
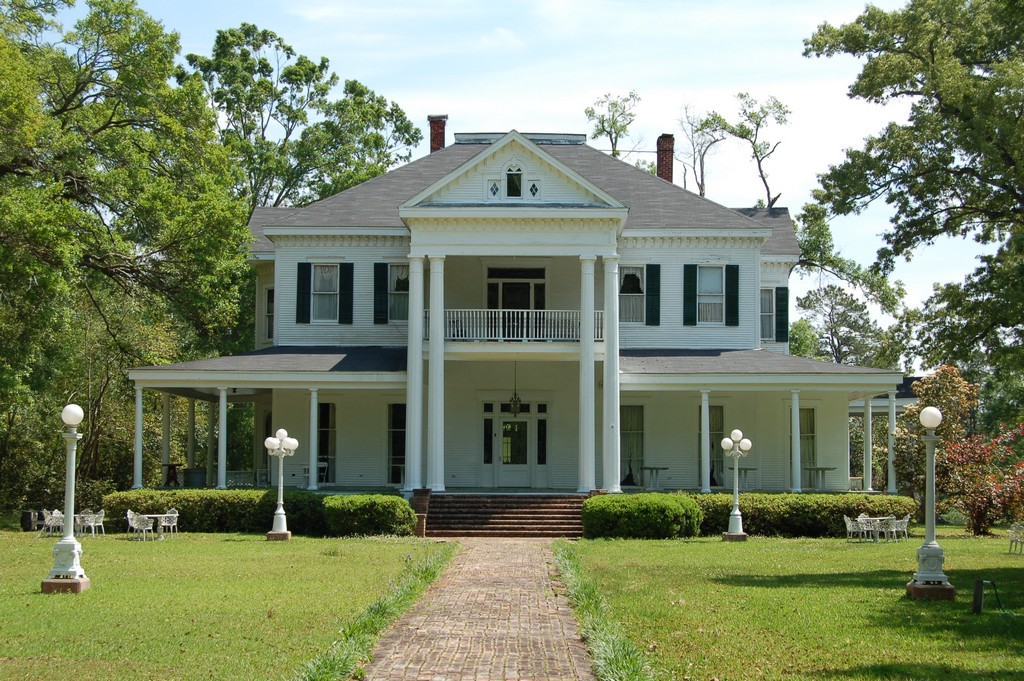

- Location within Louisiana
- Location: 205 Elm St., Amite, Louisiana
- Coordinates: 30°43′51″N 90°29′55″W
- Area: 0.6 acres (0.24 ha)
- Built: 1888
- Architectural style: Colonial Revival
- NRHP reference No.: 82002795
- Added to NRHP: June 25, 1982

Blythewood is a historic mansion in Amite City, Louisiana, U.S..

== History ==
The land was granted by New Spain to Reliegh Self. A cotton plantation with a mansion was built prior to the American Civil War of 1861–1865. However, the mansion was subsequently burned down.

A new mansion was built for Daniel Hardy Sanders from 1885 to 1888. It was designed in the Colonial Revival architectural style by Drake & Anderson. It has been listed on the National Register of Historic Places since June 25, 1982. It serves as a bed & breakfast.
