= Spring Hill Presbyterian Church =

Historic church in Tennessee, United States

- First Presbyterian Church of Spring Hill
- U.S. National Register of Historic Places
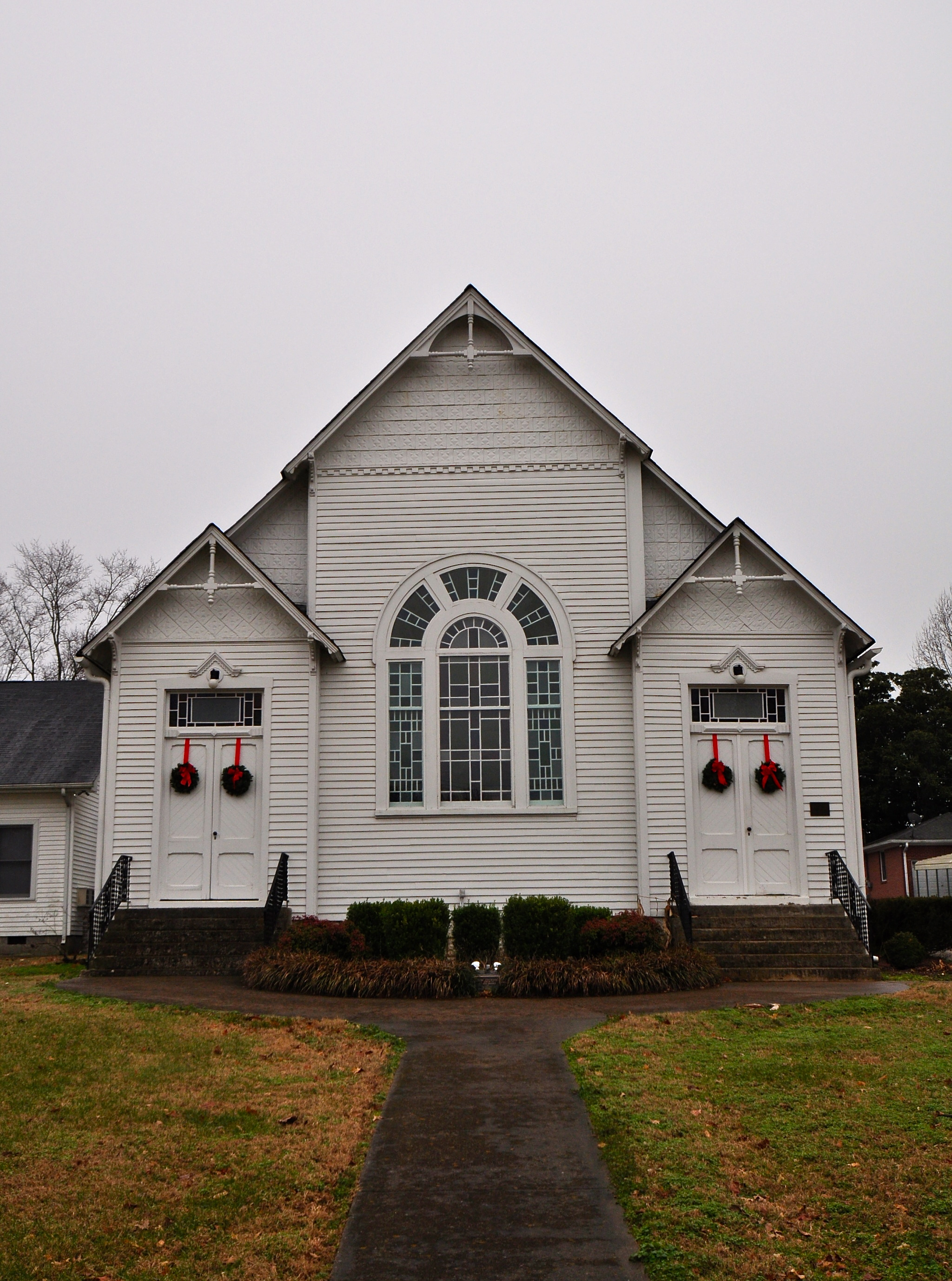
- First Presbyterian Church of Spring Hill, December 2013.

- Location within Tennessee Location within the United States
- Location: S. Main St., Spring Hill, Tennessee
- Coordinates: 35°44′56″N 86°55′52″W
- Area: 1.9 acres (0.77 ha)
- Built: 1888
- NRHP reference No.: 84003640
- Added to NRHP: July 19, 1984

First Presbyterian Church of Spring Hill (The New School Presbyterian Church at Spring Hill) is a historic church on S. Main Street in Spring Hill, Tennessee.

It was built in 1888 and added to the National Register in 1984.
