= Williamsport, Tennessee =

- Unincorporated community
- Location within Tennessee Location within the United States
- Coordinates: 35°41′12″N 87°13′10″W
- Country: United States
- State: Tennessee
- County: Maury
- Elevation: 627 ft (191 m)
- Time zone: UTC-6 (Central (CST))
  - Summer (DST): UTC-5 (CDT)
- ZIP code: 38487
- Area code: 931
- GNIS feature ID: 1274730

Williamsport is an unincorporated community in Maury County, Tennessee, United States. Its ZIP code is 38487.

Williamsport was platted in 1817, and named after Edward Williams, a pioneer settler.
