= Church House (Columbia, Tennessee) =

Historic house in Tennessee, United States

- U.S. National Register of Historic Places
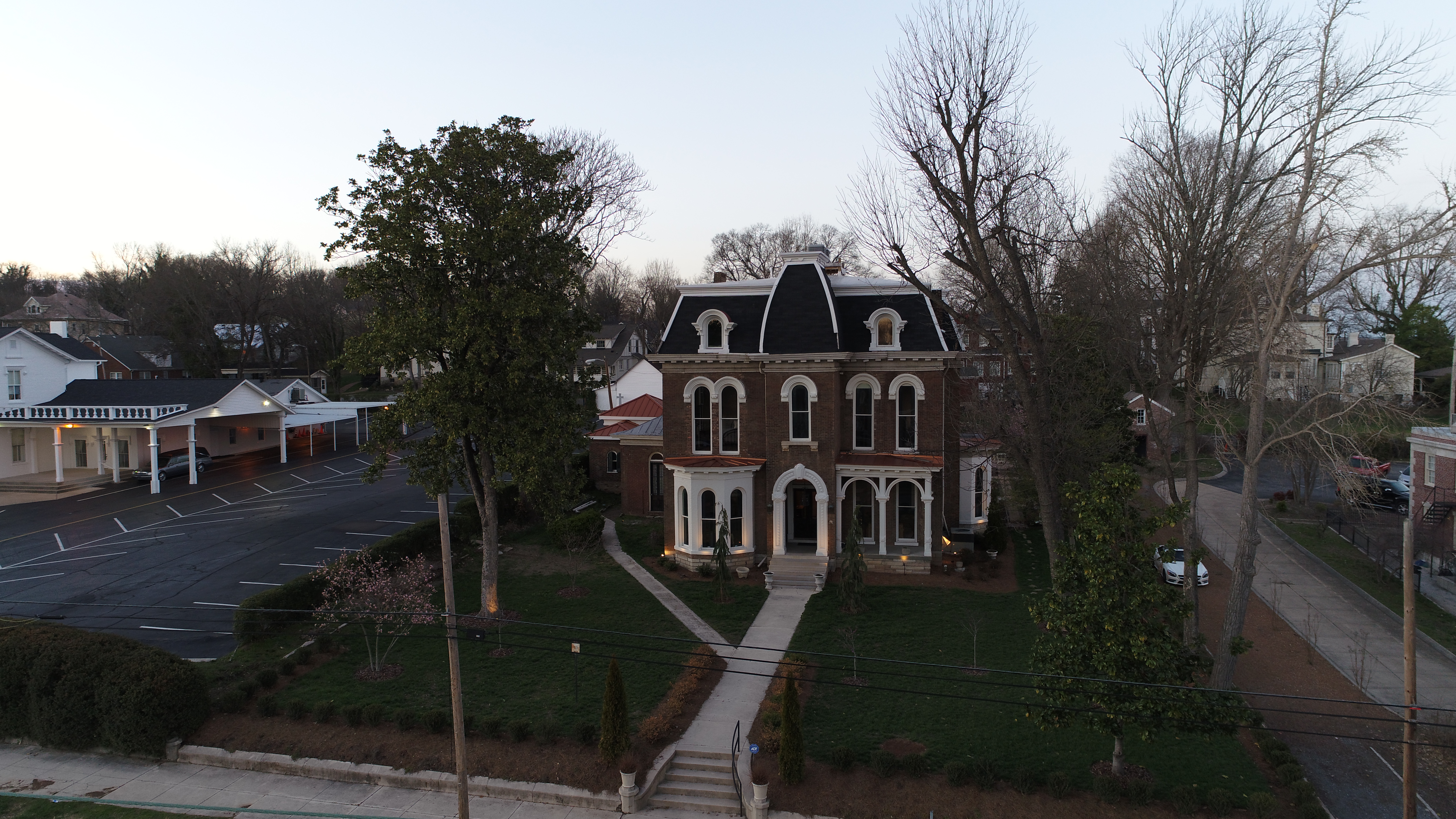
- The Church House in 2013

- Location within Tennessee Location within the United States
- Location: 312 W. 7th St., Columbia, Tennessee
- Coordinates: 35°36′56″N 87°2′19″W
- Area: 0.6 acres (0.24 ha)
- Built: 1873
- Architectural style: Second Empire
- NRHP reference No.: 78002609
- Added to NRHP: October 19, 1978

Church House, also known as the Barrow House, is a historic mansion in Columbia, Tennessee. It was listed on the National Register of Historic Places in 1978. Nominated for the National Register on 10/19/78, The Barrow House, which was built in ca. 1873, is one of the best examples the Second Empire style of architecture in Columbia and one of the grandest late-nineteenth-century houses in the city. Its decidedly three-dimensional massing, profuse ornamentation, and the combination of attached and semi-detached dependencies are distinctive. The façade porch, with its effusive decorative elements, and the bay windows in the east and south elevations emphasize the horizontal lines of the building and in part balance the predominant verticality of the tower and mansard roof. Three blocks west of the court square, the Barrow House is located in a formerly prestigious neighbourhood, an area which still contains a number of large late-nineteenth century houses. The wealthy and prominent of Columbia reside here.

Although the rear of the building has been modified somewhat to add a kitchen, the façade retains its original appearance. The current owner has gone through extensive renovations. Block-like in its staggered form and irregular plan, and highlighted with massive detailing, this impressive brick house epitomizes the Second Empire style of architecture at its most imposing best. Three stories tall and three bays wide, and resting on a cut and coursed stone foundation, the house is topped with a characteristic Second Empire mansard roof which is covered with decorative slate shingles. Except for the façade (south elevation), which was laid in stretcher bond, the walls were laid in common bond. The centre bay of the façade projects forward and has a tower, another design element typical of the Second Empire style. A heavily ornamented round arch defines the entrance to the enclosed porch at the base of the tower section. The east and west bays are set back one more than the other; the former has a covered one-story porch with carved posts, spandrels, and balustrade while the later has bay windows with round-head, one-over-one windows. This type of window is found throughout, and those in the second story of the façade have heavy hoods and in the centre bay an ornate sill. In the story above the second are round and round-arched windows in dormers with unusually decorative lintels.

Chimneys with flared tops above the east and west walls frame the mansard roof; a third chimney rises above the north wall. The cornice has bracket-like elements, and this design appears above the façade bay window and porch. The two-sectioned east elevation has a bay window unit which duplicates the one in the façade; this element is located in the projecting rear (northernmost) bay. A single-story brick kitchen, with a hip roof, is attached to the eastern section of the north wall by a covered porch, and a small, one-story, frame wing projects from the northern end of the west elevation. The kitchen appears to have been built in the nineteenth century, but the frame wing is probably a fairly recent addition. Another section of the covered porch near the northwest corner connects a second, one-story brick. building with a hip roof to the house; quite possibly, this was originally a completely detached outbuilding; for many years it was used as servant's quarters. Northwest of the house is a parking area for the homeowners and guests.

== History ==
Maury County Sheriff Latta . reputedly built the Barrow House. Robert Church, a banker and land speculator purchased it in ca. 1885. Including Robert and his descendants, the Church House was a family home for about 100 years. It was designed in the Second Empire architectural style.

The house was purchased by Robert Church, a banker, in 1885. It was later inherited by his grandson, Robert Church Barrow.

== Architectural significance ==
Information collected by Matt Locke, current owner of the Church Barrow House. According to The Columbia Daily Herald printed on November 7, 1873 'Mr. Williamson of Nashville', (Peter J. Williamson) was the architect of Sheriff Latta's new home.
