= Culleoka, Tennessee =

- Unincorporated community
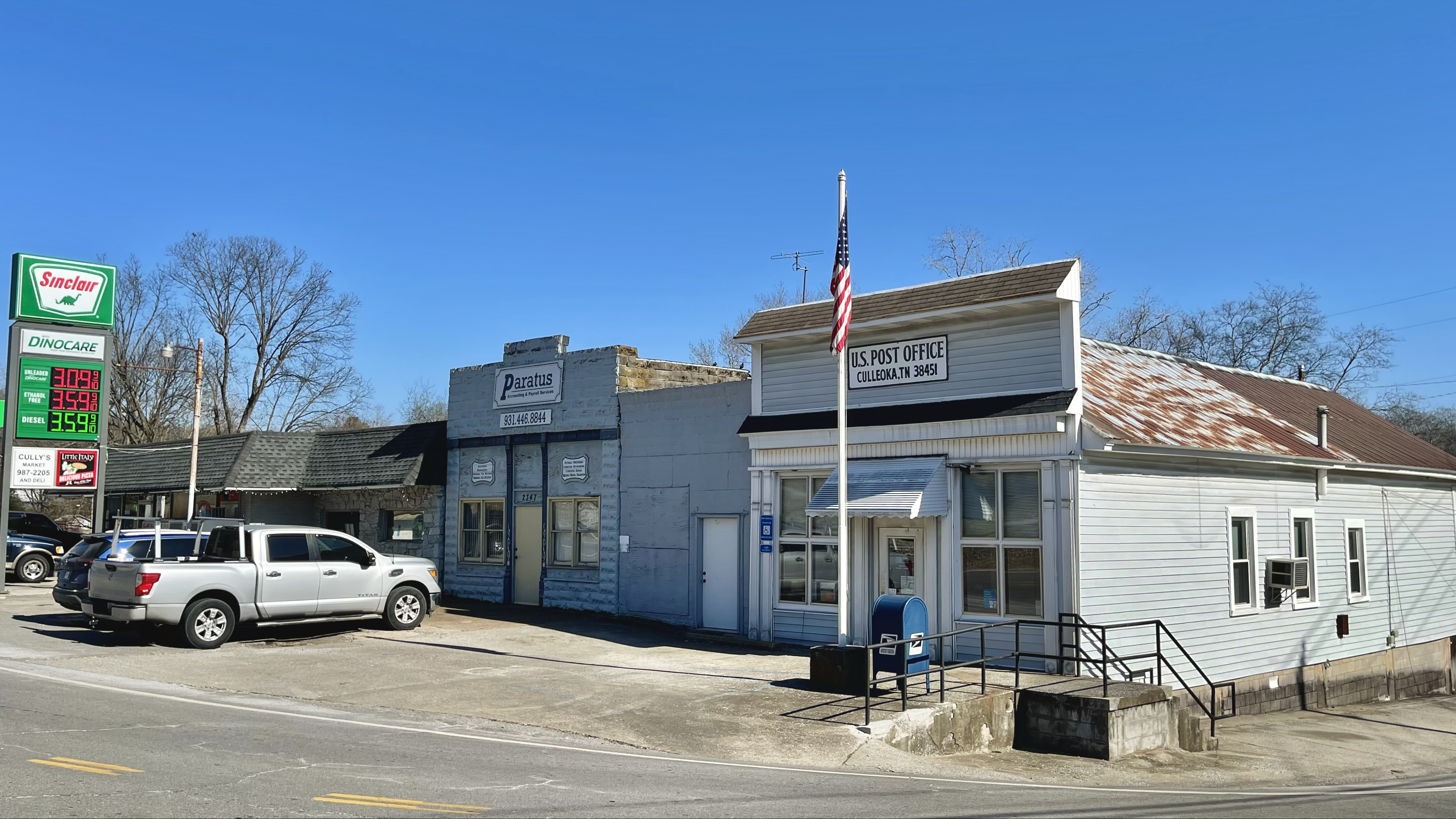
- Downtown Culleoka

- Location within Tennessee Location within the United States
- Coordinates: 35°28′46″N 86°58′59″W
- Country: United States
- State: Tennessee
- County: Maury
- Elevation: 689 ft (210 m)
- Time zone: UTC-6 (Central (CST))
  - Summer (DST): UTC-5 (CDT)
- ZIP code: 38451
- Area code: 931
- GNIS feature ID: 1306220

Culleoka is an unincorporated community in the southeastern corner of Maury County, Tennessee, United States. located southeast of Columbia. The population was 4,964 in 2010 and in 2016, the estimated population was 5,078.

Culleoka is a Native American word meaning. 'Sweet Water'. Culleoka was established in 1857 in anticipation of the construction of the Nashville and Decatur Railroad, which reached the site in 1859. Culleoka was the original site of Webb School, which is now located in the historic town of Bell Buckle.

== Demographics ==
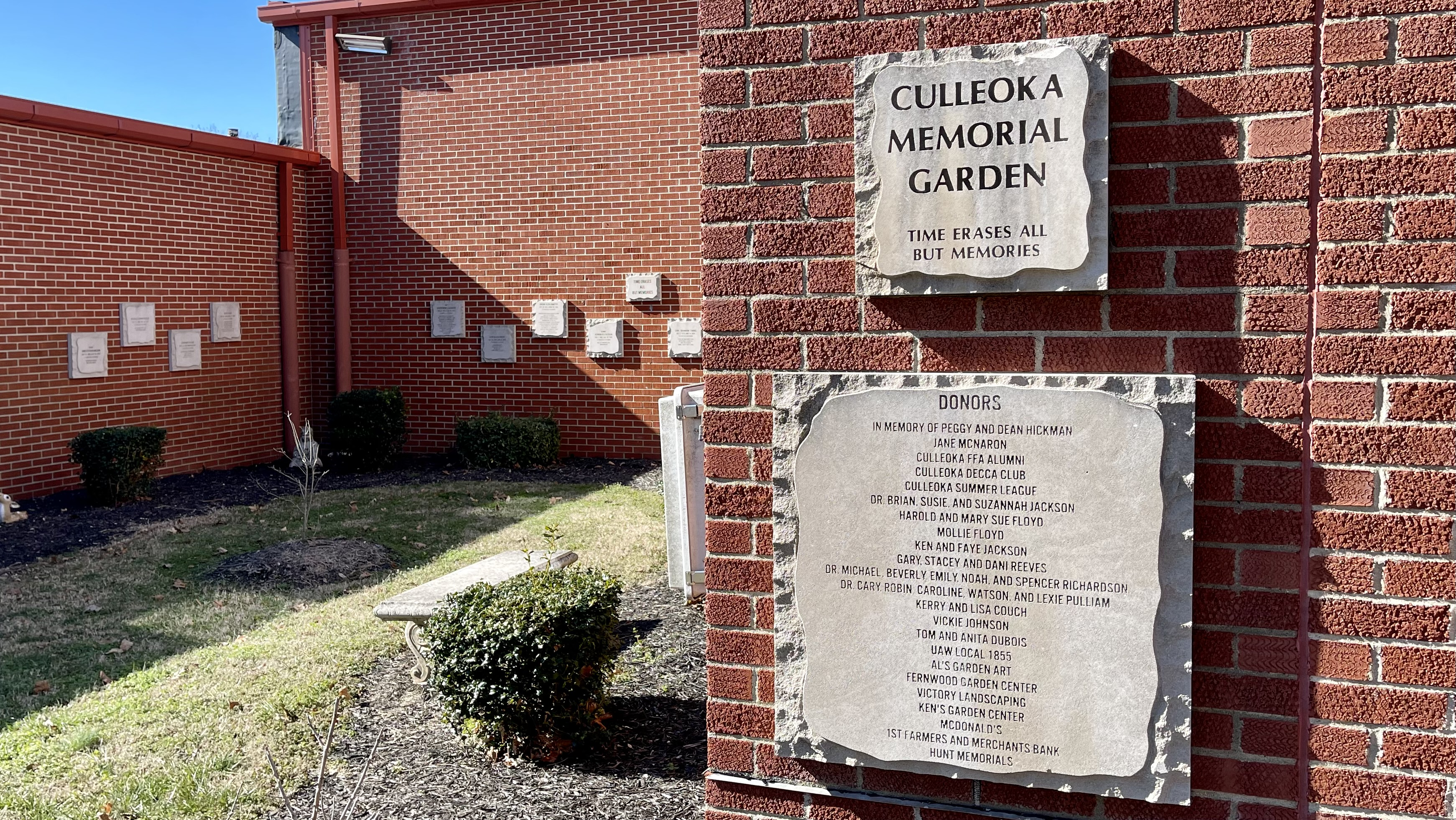
Culleoka Memorial Garden

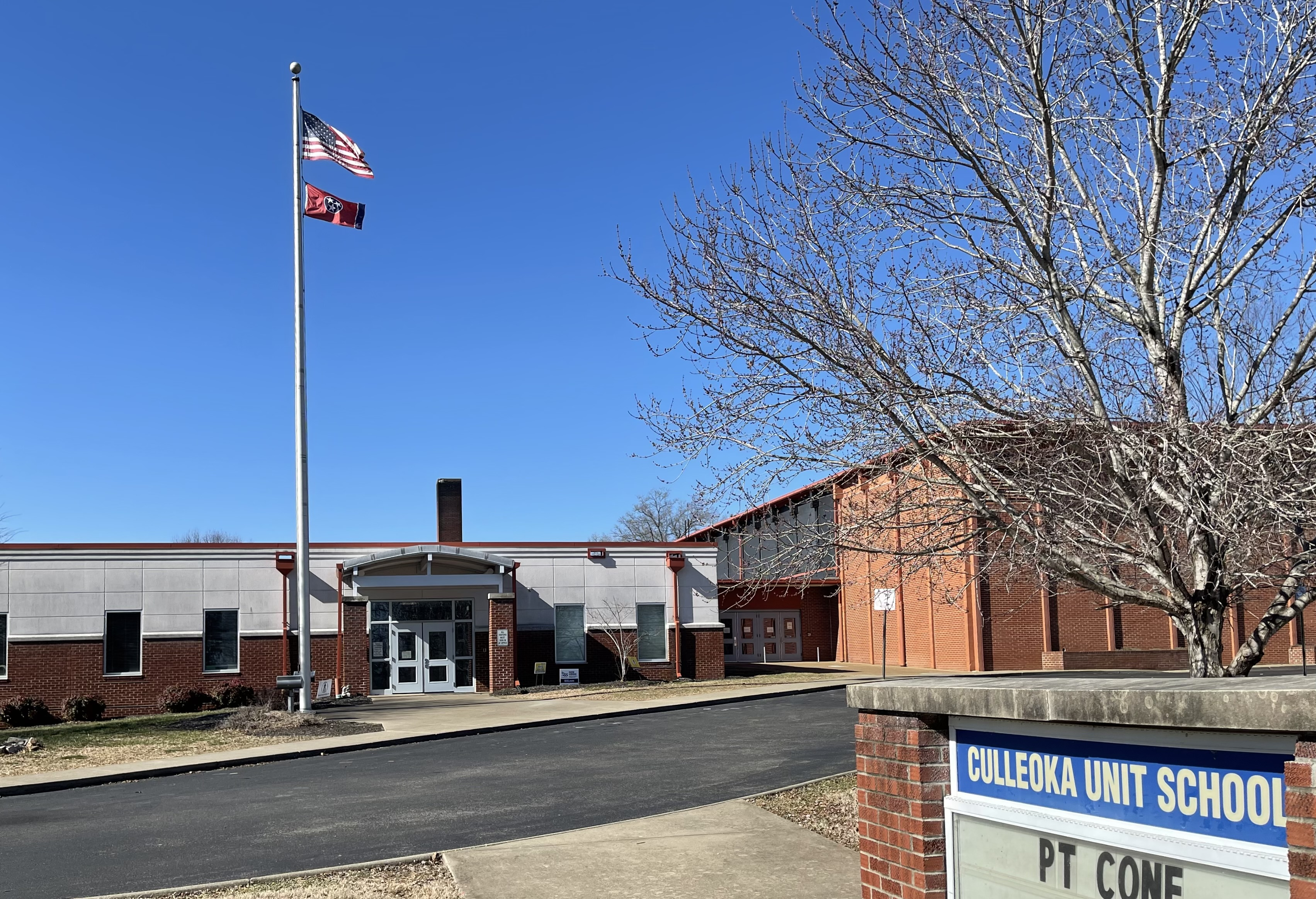
Culleoka Public School in 2022

Culleoka's population is 94.6% white, 2.6% African-American, and 1.2% Latino.

== Politics ==
The Culleoka area has voted consistently Republican since the 2004 United States presidential election.

== Religion statistics for Culleoka (based on Maury County data) ==
- Evangelical Protestant 30.4%
- Mainline Protestant 7.2%
- Black Protestant 4.8%
- Catholic 22.5%
- Other 2.4%
- None 52.6%

== Notable people ==
Andy Ogles, U.S. Representative from Tennessee's 5th congressional district
