= Tennessee State Route 243 =

American Highway

State Route 243
- SR 243 highlighted in red

Route information
- Maintained by TDOT
- Length: 12.9 mi (20.8 km)
- Existed: July 1, 1983–present

Major junctions
- South end: US 43 in Mount Pleasant
- SR 166 in Mount Pleasant; SR 50 in Columbia
- North end: US 412 Bus. in Columbia

Location
- Country: United States
- State: Tennessee
- Counties: Maury

Highway system
- Tennessee State Routes; Interstate; US; State
| ← SR 242 | → SR 244 |

State Route 243 (SR 243) is a 12.9 miles (20.8 km) north-south state highway in Maury County, Tennessee. It connects Mount Pleasant with Columbia, while also providing access to Maury County Airport.

== Route description ==
SR 243 begins at the southern edge of Mount Pleasant at an intersection with US 43/SR 6. It heads northeast along Main Street to become concurrent with SR 166 before passing through downtown, where SR 166 splits off and heads west. The highway then passes through before crossing a creek and passing by some businesses and the Maury County Airport, where it has an interchange with US 43/SR 6. SR 243 begins passing through rural areas and the community of Ashwood, where it has an intersection with Zion Road (connector to US 43), and crosses into the Columbia city limits as Trotwood Avenue. It continues northeast to pass through neighborhoods before coming to an intersection with SR 50. The highway then passes through mix of neighborhoods and businesses before coming to an end at an intersection with US 412 Business/SR 99. The entire route of SR 243 is a two-lane highway.

== History ==
The entire route of SR 243 represents the former two-lane alignment of US 43 between Mount Pleasant and Columbia.

== Major intersections ==
The entire route is in Maury County.

| Location | mi | km | Destinations | Notes |
|---|---|---|---|---|
| Mount Pleasant | 0.0 | 0.0 | US 43 (Lawrenceburg Highway / SR 6) – Lawrenceburg, Ethridge, Columbia | Southern terminus |
| Mount Pleasant | 1.2 | 1.9 | SR 166 south (Enterprise Road) – Campbellsville, Pulaski | Southern end of SR 166 concurrency |
| Mount Pleasant | 2.2 | 3.5 | SR 166 north (1st Avenue) – Hampshire | Northern end of SR 166 concurrency |
| Mount Pleasant | 4.0 | 6.4 | US 43 (Lawrenceburg Highway / SR 6) – Lawrenceburg, Columbia; Maury County Airport main entrance | Connector to US 43; access road into airport |
| Ashwood | 6.7 | 10.8 | Zion Road to US 43 | Connector to US 43 |
| Columbia | 11.4 | 18.3 | SR 50 (James Campbell Boulevard West) | |
| Columbia | 12.9 | 20.8 | US 412 Bus. (West 7th Street / SR 99) | Northern terminus |
1.000 mi = 1.609 km; 1.000 km = 0.621 mi: Concurrency terminus
