= Tennessee State Route 166 =

State highway in Tennessee, United States

State Route 166
- SR 166 highlighted in red

Route information
- Maintained by TDOT
- Length: 51.60 mi (83.04 km)

Major junctions
- South end: SR 127 at the Alabama state line in Bethel
- US 64 near Pulaski; SR 11 in Pulaski; SR 15 in Pulaski; US 43 in Mount Pleasant
- North end: US 412 in Hampshire

Location
- Country: United States
- State: Tennessee
- Counties: Giles, Maury

Highway system
- Tennessee State Routes; Interstate; US; State
← SR 165	→ SR 167

State Route 166 (SR 166) is a north–south state highway in southern Middle Tennessee, traversing Giles and Maury counties.

== Route description ==
=== Giles County ===
Alabama State Route 127 becomes SR 166 at the Alabama state line in the Bethel community of southern Giles County. SR 166 goes north as a 2-lane highway and intersects SR 273, and then goes north through rural and hilly terrain before coming to an intersection with US 64 and entering Pulaski. SR 166 then becomes concurrent with SR 11, widens to an undivided 4-lane highway, and crosses a bridge over Richland Creek to enter downtown and come to an intersection with SR 15, where SR 166 splits from SR 11 to follow SR 15 west as a 2-lane. They then leave downtown and comes to another intersection with US 64, where they become concurrent with US 64 and SR 15 becomes unsigned. They then leave Pulaski and continue west as a 4-lane undivided highway for a little over one mile (1.6 km). SR 166 splits off from US 64/SR 15 and turns northward as a 2-lane highway. SR 166 then passes through rural areas before passing through Campbellsville and having an intersection with SR 245. It then continues north to cross into Maury County.

=== Maury County ===
SR 166 continues northwest to enter Mount Pleasant, where it intersects and becomes concurrent with SR 243. They then enter downtown, where SR 166 splits off and goes west to have an intersection with US 43 (SR 6). SR 166 then turns northwest to leave Mount Pleasant and pass through rural areas before entering Hampshire and coming to an end at an intersection with US 412 (SR 99).

== Major intersections ==
County	Location	mi	km	Destinations	Notes
Giles	Bethel	0.0	0.0	SR 127 south – Athens	Southern terminus at the Alabama state line
Giles				SR 273 east (Case Road) – Prospect, Elkton	Western terminus of SR 273
Giles	Pulaski			US 64 (Lawrenceburg Highway) to I-65 – Lawrenceburg, Fayetteville	
Giles	Pulaski			SR 11 south (Minor Hill Highway) – Minor Hill	Southern end of SR 11 concurrency
Giles	Pulaski			C. E. Depriest Bridge over Richland Creek	
Giles	Pulaski			SR 15 east / SR 11 north (W College Street) – downtown, Fayetteville	Northern end of SR 11 concurrency; southern end of SR 15 concurrency
Giles	Pulaski			US 64 east (Lawrenceburg Highway) to I-65 – Fayetteville	Southern end of US 64 concurrency; SR 15 becomes unsigned
Giles				US 64 west (Lawrenceburg Highway/SR 15 west) – Fayetteville	Northern end of US 64 and unsigned SR 15 concurrency
Giles				SR 245 north (Yokley Creek Road) – Columbia	Southern terminus of SR 245
Maury	Mount Pleasant			SR 243 south (S Main Street) – Summertown, Ethridge, Lawrenceburg	Southern end of SR 243 concurrency; former US 43
Maury	Mount Pleasant			SR 243 north (N Main Street) – Columbia	Northern end of SR 243 concurrency; former US 43; provides access to Maury County Airport
Maury	Mount Pleasant			US 43 (Lawrenceburg Highway/SR 6) – Lawrenceburg, Columbia	Interchange under construction
Maury	Hampshire	51.6	83.0	US 412 (Hampshire Pike/SR 99) – Columbia, Hohenwald	Northern terminus
1.000 mi = 1.609 km; 1.000 km = 0.621 mi: Concurrency terminus
