= Tennessee State Route 245 =

State highway in southern Tennessee

State Route 245
- SR 245 highlighted in red

Route information
- Maintained by TDOT
- Length: 18.6 mi (29.9 km)
- Existed: July 1, 1983–present

Major junctions
- South end: SR 166 near Campbellsville
- North end: SR 50 in Columbia

Location
- Country: United States
- State: Tennessee
- Counties: Giles, Maury

Highway system
- Tennessee State Routes; Interstate; US; State
← SR 244	→ SR 246

State Route 245 (SR 245) is an 18.6 miles (29.9 km) long north-south state highway in southern Middle Tennessee. It connects the community of Campbellsville with the city of Columbia.

== Route description ==
SR 245 begins as Yokley Creek Road in Giles County at an intersection with SR 166 just north of Campbellsville. It winds its way north through hilly terrain for several miles to cross into Maury County, becoming Campbellsville Pike, before passing through farmland. The highway then enters the city of Columbia and winds its way northeast through neighborhoods before coming to an end at an intersection with SR 50. The entire route of SR 245 is a two-lane highway.

== Major intersections ==
County	Location	mi	km	Destinations	Notes
Giles		0.0	0.0	SR 166 (Campbellsville Road) – Mount Pleasant, Campbellsville, Pulaski	Southern terminus
Maury	Columbia	18.6	29.9	SR 50 (S James Campbell Boulevard)	Northern terminus
1.000 mi = 1.609 km; 1.000 km = 0.621 mi
