= Charles McDowell =

Charles McDowell may refer to:

- Charles McDowell (North Carolina militiaman) (1743–1815), American Revolutionary War general and politician
- Charles McDowell Jr. (journalist) (1926–2010), political writer and columnist
- Charles S. McDowell (Charles Samuel McDowell Jr., 1871–1943), interim governor of Alabama
- Charles T. McDowell (1921–2007), professor at the University of Texas at Arlington
- Charlie McDowell (born 1983), film director and screenwriter

== See also ==
- Charles McDowall (1862–1916), Australian politician
