= Sawdust (disambiguation) =

Sawdust is the material composed of fine particles of wood.

Sawdust may also refer to:

- Sawdust (album), a 2007 compilation album by the Killers
- Sawdust Hughes or Hugh "Sawdust" Hughes, Welsh rugby player

== Places ==
In the United States

- Sawdust, Georgia, unincorporated community
- Sawdust, Tennessee, unincorporated community
- Sawdust Art Festival, art festival in Laguna Beach, California

== See also ==
- Sawdust brandy, a type of alcohol made from wood products
- Serradura ("sawdust"), a Portuguese dessert
- Dust (disambiguation)
