= Felix Zollicoffer =

American newspaperman, politician, and soldier (1812 – 1862)

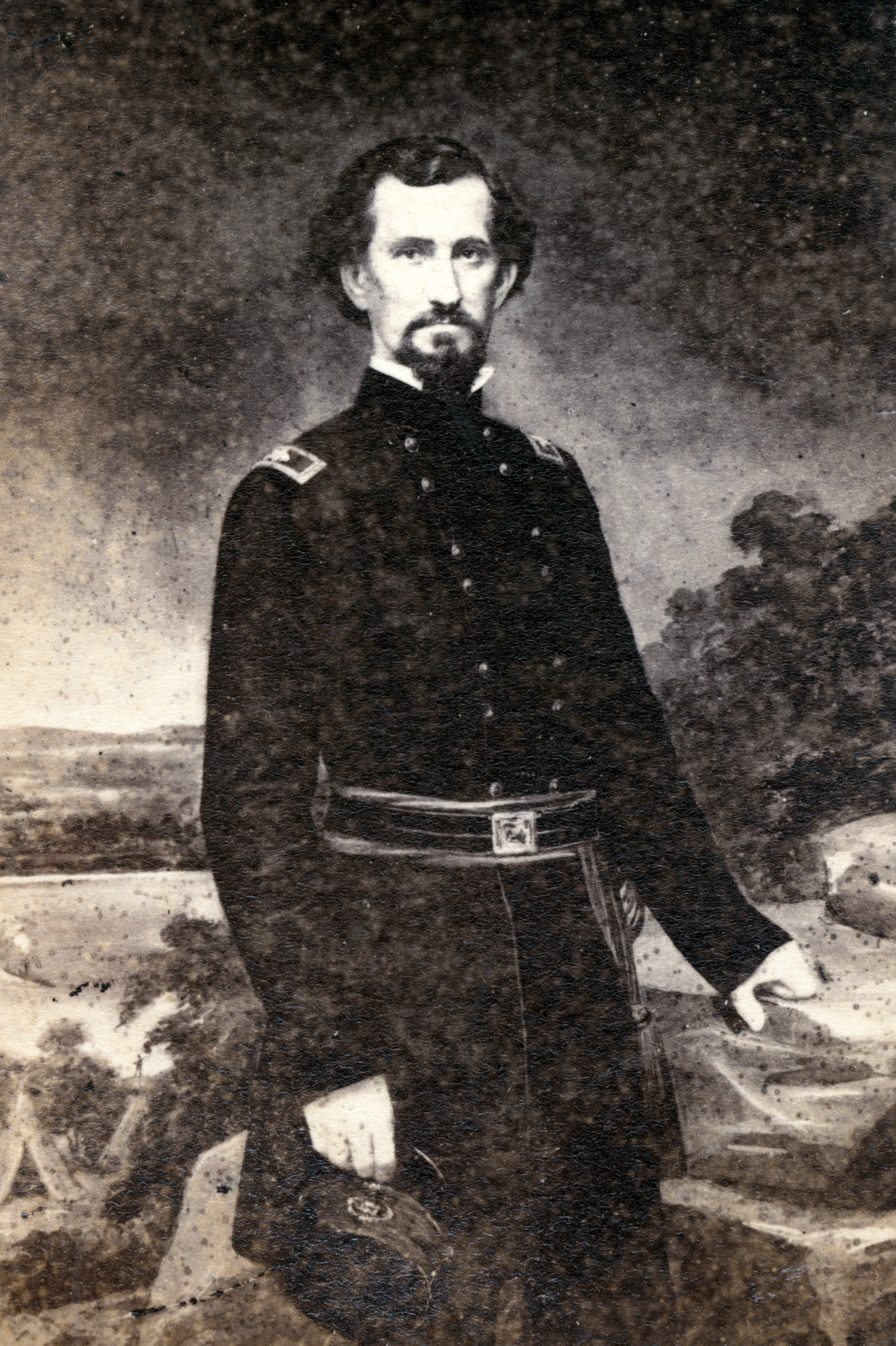

Member of the U.S. House of Representatives from Tennessee's 8th district
- In office March 4, 1853 – March 3, 1859
- Preceded by: William Cullom
- Succeeded by: James Minor Quarles

Personal details
- Born: May 19, 1812 Bigbyville, Maury County, Tennessee, U.S.
- Died: January 19, 1862 (aged 49) near present-day Nancy, Kentucky, U.S.
- Resting place: Nashville City Cemetery, Nashville, Tennessee
- Party: Whig (until 1855); Know Nothing (from 1855)
- Education: Jackson College
- Occupation: Newspaper printer and editor

Military service
- Allegiance: United States of America; State of Tennessee; Confederate States of America
- Branch/service: United States Army; Confederate States Army
- Years of service: 1836–37 (USA); 1861–62 (CSA)
- Rank: First Lieutenant (USA); Brigadier General (Tennessee); Brigadier General (CSA)
- Battles/wars: Second Seminole War; American Civil War; Battle of Barbourville; Battle of Wildcat Mountain; Battle of Mill Springs †

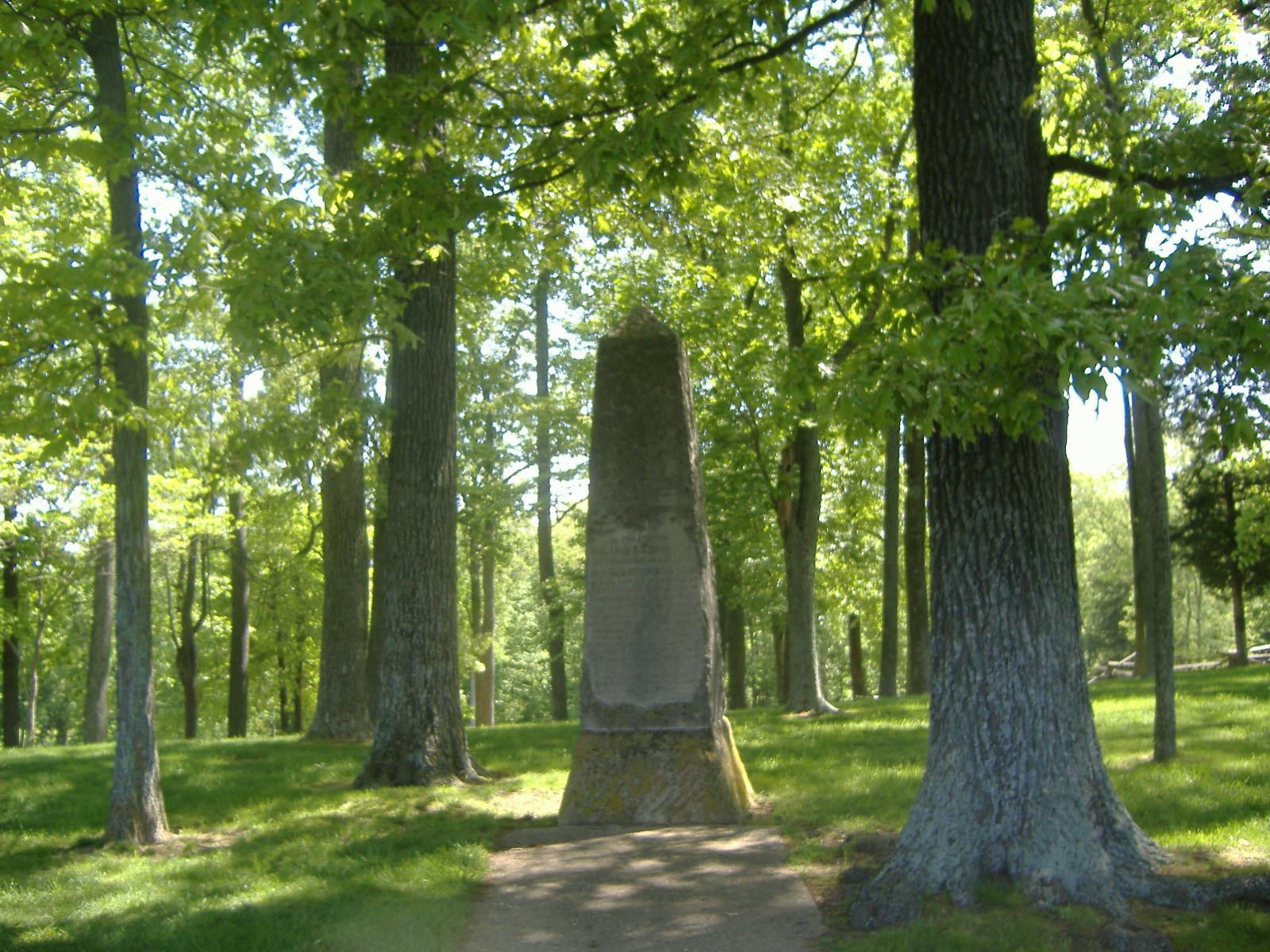
Site of Zollicoffer's death at Mill Springs Battlefield, Nancy, Kentucky.

Felix Kirk Zollicoffer (May 19, 1812 – January 19, 1862) was an American newspaperman, slave owner, politician, and soldier. He was three-term U.S. representative from Tennessee, an officer in the United States Army, and a Confederate brigadier general during the American Civil War; he led the first Confederate invasion of eastern Kentucky and was killed in action at the Battle of Mill Springs. Zollicoffer was the first Confederate general to die in the Western Theater.

== Early life and career ==
Zollicoffer was born on a plantation in Bigbyville in Maury County, Tennessee, a son of John Jacob and Martha (Kirk) Zollicoffer. He descended from a noble patrician family from Switzerland (Zollikofer) who had settled in North Carolina in 1710. His grandfather George Zollicoffer had served as a captain in the Revolutionary War and had been granted a tract of land in Tennessee as payment for his military service.

Zollicoffer attended the local schools and studied for a year at Jackson College in Columbia, Tennessee. He left at age 16, became an apprentice printer, and was engaged in newspaper work in Paris, Tennessee, from 1828 to 1830. When the newspaper closed, he moved to Knoxville in 1831 and worked for two years as a journeyman printer at the Knoxville Register. Three years later, he became editor and part owner of the Columbia Observer. Zollicoffer was elected state printer of Tennessee in 1835.

On September 24, 1835, he married Louisa Pocahontas Gordon, with whom he had 14 children, of whom only six survived infancy. Gordon was the daughter of Captain John Gordon whom it is alleged that he had fought alongside Andrew Jackson at Horseshoe Bend and Pensacola. She was a direct descendant of Pocahontas through her mother Dolly. Louisa Zollicoffer died in 1857.

Zollicoffer edited the Mercury for a time in Huntsville, Alabama. He volunteered for the army in 1836 and served as a second lieutenant in the Tennessee militia in the Second Seminole War in Florida. He then returned to Tennessee and became owner and editor of the Columbia Observer and the Southern Agriculturist and in 1843 the editor of the Republican Banner, the state organ of the Whig Party.

This brought Zollicoffer into political circles, and he was comptroller of the State Treasury from 1845 to 1849, as well as adjutant general for the state. He was a member of the State Senate from 1849 until 1852 and was a delegate to the Whig National Convention in 1852, supporting General Winfield Scott. Zollicoffer was elected as a Whig to the 33rd United States Congress and was reelected as a candidate of the American Party to the 34th and 35th Congresses (1853 – 1859). During his first term, he fought a duel with the editor of the rival Nashville Union newspaper. He declined to be a candidate for renomination in 1858 and retired to private life. He supported fellow Tennessee moderate John Bell for president in the election of 1860.

Following the secession of the Deep South in 1861, Zollicoffer served as a delegate the peace conference in Washington, D.C. in an attempt to prevent the approaching civil war. A strong supporter of states' rights, Zollicoffer nevertheless opposed Tennessee's secession from the Union.

== Civil War ==
Tennessee voters rejected the call for a secession convention in February 1861. Tennessee Governor Isham Harris soon began to maneuver the state into a position where secession would be inevitable. On May 6, 1861, the Tennessee General Assembly, urged on by Harris, adopted a "Declaration of Independence and Ordinance." The people were to vote on the ratification of this measure on June 8. A separate vote on the same date would determine if Tennessee should join the Confederacy if the voters approved the measure asserting independence of the State. On May 9, a joint committee of the legislature issued an explanation sponsored by Harris of the military alliance Tennessee had entered into with the Confederacy on May 7.

During the period between April and July, Harris organized a state army, the Provisional Army of Tennessee. Upon the announcement, Zollicoffer offered his service to the state army. Despite only having brief combat experience, he was appointed as a brigadier general. The Confederate States Army began to absorb the Provisional Army of Tennessee in July, and Zollicoffer's troops were mustered into Confederate service in October.

Harris initially tried to sway the pro-Union population in East Tennessee with a lenient policy, and he stationed only 15 companies of troops in the region. On July 26, 1861, Harris, who was still in charge of the Tennessee state force, ordered Zollicoffer and 4,000 raw recruits to Knoxville to be in position to suppress resistance to secession in East Tennessee, appointing him to command the District of East Tennessee. Harris was re-elected governor on August 8, and on August 18 he ordered Zollicoffer to arrest and, if necessary, banish leaders of pro-Union factions from the state, changing his policy from leniency to force.

=== Invasion of Kentucky ===
==== Cumberland Gap ====
In an effort to prevent a Union Army incursion into East Tennessee, Zollicoffer took the initiative and occupied Cumberland Gap on September 14. Zollicoffer was responsible for guarding the 128 miles (206 km) of Confederate line between Cumberland Gap and Tompkinsville, Kentucky. For 71 miles, this line crossed the Cumberland Mountains. On September 15 General Albert Sidney Johnston assumed command of Confederate forces in the Western theater between the Appalachian Mountains and the Mississippi River. He retained Zollicoffer as district commander in East Tennessee.

On September 17 Zollicoffer sent a force through the Cumberland Gap along the Wilderness Road to drive the Union Army from Barbourville, Kentucky, relieve pressure on the recently established Confederate line at Bowling Green and thwart an expected drive by Union Brigadier General George H. Thomas into East Tennessee and the Cumberland Gap by forcing him to retain his force in Kentucky. On September 19, 800 of Zollicoffer's men under Colonel Joel Battle ambushed the Union force of about 150 home guards while they were foraging and pushed them out of Barbourville at the Battle of Barbourville. Another detachment of Zollicoffer's force under Colonel James Rains dispersed an encampment of Union recruits at Laurel Bridge, Kentucky, on September 26, while the Goose Creek Salt Works were attacked by a second Confederate unit under Colonel D. H. Cummings, which carried off 200 barrels of salt. Zollicoffer's force was essentially on a raid and soon withdrew.

In mid-October, a large part of Zollicoffer's force marched 40 miles (64 km) from Cumberland Gap to London, Kentucky. At the Battle of Wildcat Mountain on October 21, Zollicoffer's force was stymied by a prepared Union force fighting on rugged terrain, and he retreated into rural East Tennessee, which remained rife with Union sentiment.

==== Encampment at Mill Springs ====
In November Zollicoffer changed strategy and advanced westward, then back into southeastern Kentucky to strengthen Confederate control in the area just south of Somerset. He hoped this would put him in a position to be reinforced by Confederate forces from Bowling Green and to drive Thomas's force from the area. Before he moved west, Zollicoffer left forces to guard the Cumberland Gap and three other approaches to East Tennessee.

Zollicoffer moved west and established an encampment at Mill Springs, Kentucky, (near present-day Nancy) on the south bank of the Cumberland River. By December 6, he had moved his force to the north bank of the river, where he thought he could better support the supply of his men, build fortifications and keep watch on Thomas's force. This was a risky tactic because Zollicoffer's men were poorly equipped, ill-trained and ill-disciplined. They were not properly prepared to meet the growing Union threat, and Zollicoffer's expectation that he would solve this problem by receiving supplies and reinforcements at Beech Grove, opposite Mill Springs, was too optimistic. Many of the men in Confederate service in Tennessee who could have reinforced Zollicoffer remained unarmed. Zollicoffer's own reserve force at Knoxville was mostly unarmed.

Under the circumstances in December 1861, without needed supplies or reserves, Zollicoffer was in no position to move against the Union force. On December 20 Zollicoffer did not respond to a movement by a force under Brigadier General Albin F. Schoepf, who was attempting to provoke Zollicoffer to commit his force to an engagement in the open. Colonel William H. Carroll did not leave Knoxville with his brigade to join Zollicoffer until January 16, 1862. Ultimately, he could bring only a single regiment to Mill Springs, having been ordered to send the rest of his men to Bowling Green.

Unaware of the situation in East Tennessee and of Zollicoffer's plan, on December 8, 1861, Confederate President Jefferson Davis appointed Major General George B. Crittenden to command the district of East Tennessee in order to lead a force into Kentucky. Crittenden assumed command of the district only to find that the 10 regiments he expected to find there did not exist. Crittenden retained Zollicoffer as commander of the 1st Brigade in his army. On December 15, Zollicoffer sent word to Crittenden that Thomas had 10 regiments under his command. While lingering at Knoxville for two more weeks, Crittenden sent word to Zollicoffer to move back to the south side of the Cumberland River. Zollicoffer had only two rafts to cross the swollen river which was nearly at flood stage, so he stayed at Beech Grove on the north side of the river.

On January 1, 1862, Thomas moved from his camp at Lebanon, Kentucky, to join with Schoepf's troops from Somerset. On January 2, Crittenden arrived at Mill Springs and decided the Confederates should attack Thomas before he could join with Schoepf. The Confederate force of about 6,500 men might have withstood an attack within their fortifications, but Thomas's larger force would have the advantage in the open field. Because of the incessant rain and resulting mud, Thomas needed 18 days to move his force and equipment from Lebanon to Logan's Crossroads.

==== Battle of Mill Springs ====
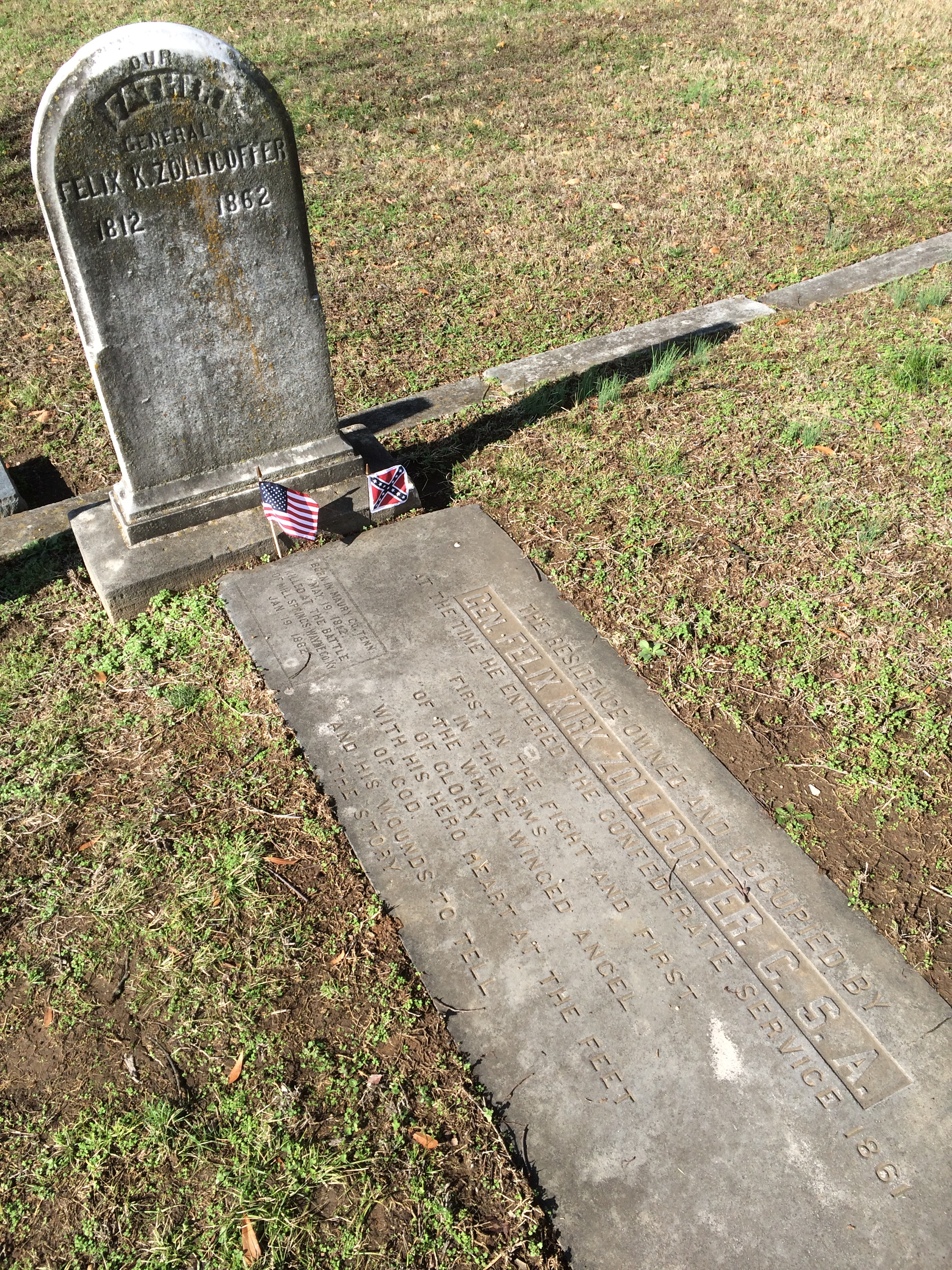
"First in the fight and first in the arms of the white winged angel of glory, with his hero heart at the feet of God and his wounds to tell the story" —grave of General Felix K. Zollicoffer at Nashville City Cemetery.

On January 18 Crittenden ordered an advance at midnight, while the two Union forces under Thomas and Schoepf were separated by the rain-swollen Fishing Creek. Zollicoffer led the first brigade toward Logan's Crossroads, while Carroll commanded the following brigade.

After marching 8 miles (13 km) in a driving rain, Zollicoffer's skirmishers attacked the Union pickets 1 mile (1.6 km) south of the intersection of the Mill Springs and Columbia-Somerset roads. The Battle of Mill Springs was a three-hour fight in driving rain, fog and the smoke of battle over thickly wooded ground. The untrained Confederates were confused in this situation, and their organization was lost. Adding to the confusion, some of the Confederates were wearing blue uniforms.

The 15th Mississippi Infantry Regiment mistook the Union 4th Kentucky Infantry Regiment for blue-clad Confederates. In the confusion, the near-sighted Zollicoffer, wearing a white raincoat, rode into the lines of the 4th Kentucky and began to discuss the problem with Union Colonel Speed S. Fry. A Confederate aide then rode out of the fog firing at the Union force. Union soldiers returned fire, killing Zollicoffer who had begun to ride away as the incident unfolded. Historian Larry J. Daniel follows some other accounts which claim that Fry recognized and shot Zollicoffer. He further states that Fry, not Zollicoffer, had ridden into the enemy lines and had begun the conversation, only turning upon Zollicoffer when the Confederate aide rode up. Historian Stuart W. Sanders quotes a subsequent account by Colonel Fry. He states that both officers rode out from their lines and that Fry initially thought Zollicoffer was a Union officer. Fry claimed to have shot Zollicoffer. Other accounts state that Fry also called to a few of his men to fire, although Fry later denied this.

Many of the old Confederate flintlock weapons would not fire in the wet conditions, and Zollicoffer's death caused his demoralized men to start a retreat. Thomas sent six regiments against the weak Confederate flank, causing the Confederate line to collapse and retreat to Beech Grove. Crittenden moved the remaining force across the Cumberland River overnight on a small steamboat and a few barges. He left his artillery, mules, equipment and most of his food supply on the north bank, shattering his ordnance and logistical strength

== Interment ==
Federal officials treated Zollicoffer's body with respect. He was embalmed by a Union surgeon and was returned to Tennessee and interred in the Old City Cemetery in Nashville.

== Zollicoffer Park ==
Zollicoffer Park, a Confederate cemetery containing a mass grave of the Confederate fallen, lies just outside Nancy. The Union Mill Springs National Cemetery is also located in Nancy. The park receives at least two memorial events each year, one on January 19 and the other on Memorial Day. There have also been re-enactments of the Battle of Mill Springs.

== See also ==
- List of American Civil War generals (Confederate)

== Notes ==
U.S. House of Representatives
Preceded by William Cullom	Member of the U.S. House of Representatives from Tennessee's 8th congressional district March 4, 1853 – March 3, 1859	Succeeded by James Minor Quarles
