= Fountain Heights, Tennessee =

Unincorporated community in Tennessee, US

Coordinates: 35°32′41″N 86°57′59″W

Fountain Heights is an unincorporated community in Maury County, Tennessee, with an elevation of 607 feet (185 m).
