= Baseball (TV series) =

1994 American television documentary miniseries

- Genre: Documentary film
- Created by: Ken Burns
- Written by: Geoffrey C. Ward; Ken Burns
- Directed by: Ken Burns
- Starring: see text
- Narrated by: John Chancellor
- Country of origin: United States
- Original language: English
- No. of episodes: 9

Production
- Producers: Ken Burns; Lynn Novick
- Running time: approx. 18.5 hours total
- Production company: National Endowment for the Humanities

Original release
- Network: PBS
- Release: September 18 – September 28, 1994

Related
- The Tenth Inning

Baseball is a 1994 American television documentary miniseries created by documentary filmmaker Ken Burns about the history of the sport of baseball.

First broadcast on PBS, this was Burns' ninth documentary and won the 1995 Primetime Emmy Award for Outstanding Informational Series. It was funded in part by the National Endowment for the Humanities.

== Format ==
Baseball, like Burns' previous documentaries such as The Civil War, used archived pictures and film footage mixed with interviews for visual presentation. Actors provide voice over reciting written work (letters, speeches, etc.) over pictures and video. Episodes are interspersed with the music of the times taken from previous Burns series, original played music, or recordings ranging from Louis Armstrong to Elvis Presley. John Chancellor, anchor of the NBC Nightly News from 1970 to 1982, narrated the series.

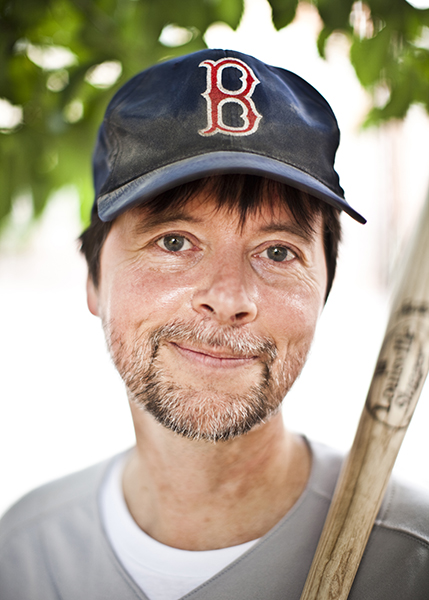
Ken Burns in 2010

The documentary is divided into nine parts, each referred to as an "inning", following the division of a baseball game. Each "inning" reviews an era, mentioning notable moments in the world and in America itself, and begins with a brief prologue acting as an insight to the game during that era. The prologue ends with the playing of "The Star-Spangled Banner" just as a real baseball game would begin, being performed usually by a brass band, with a couple of exceptions: The 1920s, where the rendition is played by a piano of the era, and the 1960s, where the rendition is the version played by Jimi Hendrix at Woodstock. In some "inning" episodes, a period version of the baseball anthem "Take Me Out to the Ball Game" is used. Roughly halfway through each "inning", a title card appears, reading "Bottom of" the inning, dividing the episode into two parts in a manner also recalling the game; in the seventh "inning", the "Bottom" is immediately preceded by the "seventh-inning stretch", which consists of several of the documentary's contributors singing "Take Me Out to the Ball Game". Within these halves of the episode, there are smaller segments also highlighted with a simple title card that often highlights various important parts of baseball's history. These often include player highlights, important or eventful games, or the creation of various brands that are now well known throughout baseball such as Louisville Slugger.

== The Nine Innings ==
1st Inning – Our Game
This inning serves as an introduction to the game and the series, and covers baseball's origins and the game as it evolved prior to the 20th century, to where professional leagues make the game grow in popularity, and notoriety, throughout the growing nation.

Original airdate: Sunday, September 18, 1994.

2nd Inning – Something Like A War
This inning covers approximately 1900 to 1910, and includes the formation of the American League and its integration with the National League, culminating in the establishment of the World Series, as well as the emergence of the game's first great stars, Christy Mathewson and Honus Wagner, who help to clean up baseball's previously bad reputation as a rowdy, brawling game. Ty Cobb is discussed in-depth (the title of this inning comes from one of his many quotes). Many of the quotes used in this inning and of the other early innings are taken from Lawrence S. Ritter's best selling The Glory of Their Times.

Original airdate: Monday, September 19, 1994.

3rd Inning – The Faith of Fifty Million People
This inning covers approximately 1910 to 1920, and follows baseball as it goes through its greatest era of popularity yet. It heavily focuses on the Black Sox Scandal, taking its title from a line in the novel The Great Gatsby. The line refers to how easy it was for gamblers to tamper with the faith people put in the game's fairness.

Original airdate: Tuesday, September 20, 1994.

4th Inning – A National Heirloom
This inning covers approximately 1920 to 1930, and focuses on baseball's recovery from the Black Sox Scandal, giving much of the credit to the increase in power hitting throughout the game, led by its savior Babe Ruth. The title comes from what sports writers called Ruth. During an interview given to MLB Network during the series' re-airing in 2009, Burns stated he originally wanted to title the 4th Inning "That Big Son-of-a-Bitch", a name given to Ruth by many in the game during that era. However, the companion book uses this title.

Original airdate: Wednesday, September 21, 1994.

5th Inning – Shadow Ball
This inning covers approximately 1930 to 1940. A great deal of this inning covers the Negro leagues, and the great players and organizers who were excluded from the Major Leagues. Also, the episode deals with organized Baseball's response to the Great Depression, as well as the sad decline of its most iconic star, Babe Ruth, and the emergence of new heroes, like Bob Feller, Hank Greenberg, and Joe DiMaggio.

Original airdate: Thursday, September 22, 1994.

6th Inning – The National Pastime
This inning covers approximately 1940 to 1950. The emphasis here is on baseball finally becoming what it had always purported to be: a national game, as African-Americans are finally permitted to play Major League Baseball, led by Jackie Robinson. This inning also looks at how the game responded to World War II and how the game became, more than ever, a symbol of America itself.

Original airdate: Sunday, September 25, 1994.

7th Inning – The Capital of Baseball
This inning covers approximately 1950 to 1960. Burns emphasizes the greatness of the three teams based in New York (the New York Yankees, the New York Giants, and Brooklyn Dodgers). This inning also covers one of baseball's golden eras and how America's own changes, such as leaving urban areas and heading west to more open suburbs, caused baseball to follow.

Original airdate: Monday, September 26, 1994.

8th Inning – A Whole New Ballgame
This inning covers approximately 1960 to 1970. As the nation underwent turbulent changes, baseball was not immune, as Babe Ruth's beloved record of 60 home runs in a season is threatened by a sullen and complicated player, Roger Maris, and for the first time in decades, pitchers, led by stars Sandy Koufax and Bob Gibson, dominate the game. The loss of home run power and betrayal to the game's past, combined with the meteoric rise of football, cause many to turn their back on baseball. Expansion and labor are major topics in this inning.

Original airdate: Tuesday, September 27, 1994.

9th Inning – Home
The final inning covers approximately 1970 to 1992. While baseball survived the 1960s, the changes were not over, and in some ways, its most bitter conflicts were just beginning. Major topics included the formation of the players' union, the owners' collusion, free agency, and drugs, as well as gambling, scandals. However, the game manages to win back the hearts of many with such moments as the excitement of the 1975 World Series and the return of the New York Yankees to dominance. The documentary ends with an ironic boast baseball (and indirectly the World Series) had survived wars, depressions, pandemics, and numbers of scandals and thus could never be stopped. The 1994 World Series, the series to be played the year the film first aired on PBS, was cancelled due to a players' strike. This marked the first time since 1904 the World Series was not played.

Original airdate: Wednesday, September 28, 1994.

10th Inning – (Episode 1, Top of the 10th)
This two part, four hour encore presentation covers stories from 1992 to 2010. The first part discusses the labor stoppage of the 1990s, which disgruntles fans as well as Mark McGwire's and Sammy Sosa's pursuit of the home run record in 1998.

Original airdate: Tuesday, September 28, 2010.

10th Inning – (Episode 2, Bottom of the 10th)
This two part, four hour encore presentation covers stories from 1992 to 2010. The second part spends a fair amount of time covering the steroid scandal in the 2000s, as well as the role baseball played in helping the nation heal from 9/11, and how the game, even in the midst of America's greatest economic crisis since the Great Depression continue to become as popular as it has ever been.

Original airdate: Wednesday, September 29, 2010.

== Interview subjects ==
The following is a non-exhaustive list of people not involved in baseball who were interviewed in the documentary:

- Arthur Ashe, tennis player
- Roger Angell, editor and writer, The New Yorker
- Mike Barnicle, writer
- Thomas Boswell, Washington Post columnist.
- Howard Bryant, writer, ESPN
- Mario Cuomo, former governor of New York (and a former prospect in the Pittsburgh Pirates system)
- Robert Creamer, writer, Sports Illustrated
- Billy Crystal, actor, comedian
- Gerald Early, Professor of Modern Letters, Washington University in St. Louis
- Shelby Foote, writer and historian
- Doris Kearns Goodwin, writer and historian
- Stephen Jay Gould, evolutionary biologist
- Donald Hall, poet and 14th U.S. Poet Laureate
- Gary Hoenig, journalist
- Manuel Marquez-Sterling, historian
- Charley McDowell, journalist
- Willie Morris, writer
- Daniel Okrent, public editor, The New York Times
- Keith Olbermann, broadcaster
- Thomas Phillip "Tip" O'Neill, Jr., former Speaker of the United States House of Representatives
- George Plimpton, writer
- Shirley Povich, sports writer, Washington Post
- John Sayles, filmmaker (most notably Eight Men Out)
- Studs Terkel, writer and journalist
- John Thorn, historian
- Tom Verducci, writer, Sports Illustrated and television commentator on TBS and the MLB Network
- George Will, political commentator

The following is a non-exhaustive list of people who were more involved in the game of baseball, and were interviewed in the documentary:

- Hank Aaron
- Red Barber, broadcaster
- A.B. "Happy" Chandler, Commissioner of Baseball
- Bob Costas, broadcaster
- Charles "Chub" Feeney, executive, New York/San Francisco Giants
- Donald Fehr, MLBPA President
- Bob Feller
- Curt Flood
- Milt Gaston
- Billy Herman
- Bill "the Spaceman" Lee
- Mickey Mantle
- Pedro Martínez
- Marvin Miller, union organizer for Major League players
- Buck O'Neil
- Double Duty Radcliffe
- Jimmie Reese
- Rachel Robinson, widow of Jackie Robinson
- Mamie Ruth, sister of Babe Ruth
- Bud Selig, Commissioner
- Vin Scully, broadcaster
- Clyde Sukeforth, scout and manager, Brooklyn Dodgers
- Ichiro Suzuki
- Joe Torre
- Omar Vizquel
- Ted Williams

== Voices ==
The following provided voice-over readings in Baseball:

- Adam Arkin as Joe Medwick
- Philip Bosco, as Albert Spalding and Ban Johnson
- Keith Carradine as "Shoeless Joe" Jackson
- David Caruso
- Billy Crystal
- John Cusack
- Ossie Davis
- Loren Dean
- Doris Kearns Goodwin
- Stephen Jay Gould
- Ed Harris
- Julie Harris
- John Hartford
- Gregory Hines
- Anthony Hopkins as Henry Chadwick and George Bernard Shaw
- Jesse Jackson
- Derek Jacobi
- Gene Jones
- Garrison Keillor as Walt Whitman
- Alan King
- Stephen King
- Delroy Lindo as Rube Foster
- Al Lewis
- Stephen Lang
- Amy Madigan
- Charley McDowell
- Arthur Miller
- Michael Moriarty
- Paul Newman
- Tip O'Neill
- Gregory Peck as Kid Gleason and Connie Mack
- Jody Powell as Ty Cobb
- George Plimpton
- Aidan Quinn
- LaTanya Richardson
- Jason Robards as John McGraw, Kenesaw Mountain Landis and Harry Frazee
- John Sayles as Ring Lardner
- Jerry Stiller
- Studs Terkel as Hugh Fullerton
- John Turturro
- Eli Wallach
- M. Emmet Walsh
- Paul Winfield as Satchel Paige and W.E.B. Du Bois

== Reception ==
Critics and audiences praised the series but criticized its length and detail. At 18.5 hours, the runtime of the series is one of Burns' longest.

The first episode more than doubled PBS's average primetime ratings with a Nielsen rating of 5.1 and an audience share of 7% but did not do as well as Civil War's 9 rating and 13% share.

== The Tenth Inning ==
At a preview screening of his 2007 documentary The War, Ken Burns spoke of the possibility of coming up to date in the history of baseball with a "Tenth Inning" episode of his Baseball documentary. This was officially confirmed by Burns in an MLB Network interview, and later to the NBC LA web site during the winter Television Critics Association media tour January 8. It aired in Fall 2010 and covered the period from 1992 through the 2009 season.

During in-game coverage of a Texas Rangers game during July 2009, Burns was interviewed, and said The Tenth Inning would air "about a year from now" on PBS. He also stated that it would be two two-hour programs. One would be the "top of the 10th", and the other would be the "bottom of the 10th". He also said that "the good Lord willing", there would be an 11th Inning and a 12th Inning in the future. His aim was to air the 11th Inning in 2020 opening with Armando Galarraga. Burns also said that Baseball is the only one of his documentaries to which he was ever interested in doing a "sequel" (of sorts).

The Tenth Inning premiered on PBS on September 28, 2010, narrated by Keith David. The Inning was broken into two halves airing on September 28 and 29, 2010. The documentary discussed the major stories that covered the period from 1992 through the 2009 season. It focuses heavily on examining the Steroid era and the many players who got caught up in it, but also discusses other major issues in baseball, such as how baseball rebounded from the 1994 strike largely thanks to the selflessness of Cal Ripken Jr. and other players, the return to prominence of the Yankees, the influence of international players (specifically Dominican and Japanese players) on the game, and the drama of the 2003 and 2004 American League Championship Series, which helped baseball, even in the midst of America's greatest economic crisis since the Great Depression, become as popular as it has ever been.

=== Critical reception ===
David Hinckley of New York Daily News wrote, "Ken Burns hits another one out of the park."

== 2020 reairing ==
The complete series (including the Tenth Inning segments) was streamed online for free by PBS during the shortened 2020 Major League Baseball season, starting on what would have been the regular opening day for the season, hoping to "fill the void" left by the lack of baseball. In a video message posted the Sunday prior, Ken Burns confirmed the following: "As we hunker down in the days ahead, it’s important that we find things that bring us together and show us our common humanity. That’s why, in the absence of many of our favorite sports, I’ve asked PBS — that’s the Public Broadcasting Service — to stream my film about America’s pastime, ‘Baseball.’ Stay healthy and let’s look after each other. Play ball."

== See also ==
- List of baseball films
