= Battle of Barbourville =

Battle of the American Civil War

Coordinates: 36°51′40″N 83°52′46″W

- Part of the American Civil War
Date	September 19, 1861
Location	Barbourville, Knox County, Kentucky
Result	Confederate victory

Belligerents
United States of America (Union): Home Guard	(Confederate States of America) CSA (Confederacy)

Commanders and leaders
Isaac J. Black	Felix Zollicoffer, Joel A. Battle, commanding engaged detachment

Strength
300 Home Guardsmen	800 men engaged

Casualties and losses
1 dead 1 wounded 13 captured	7 dead

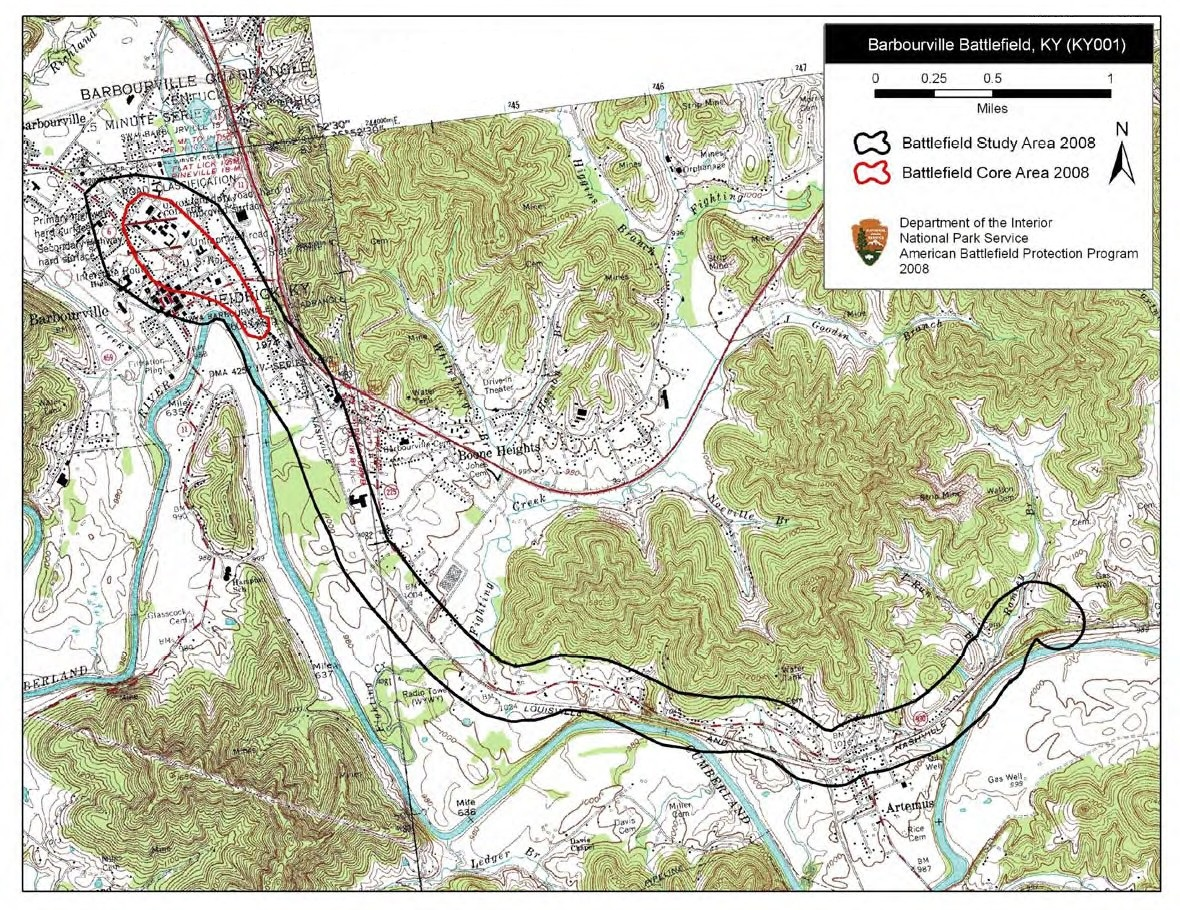
Map of Barbourville Battlefield core and study areas by the American Battlefield Protection Program.

The Battle of Barbourville was one of the early engagements of the American Civil War. It took place on September 19, 1861, in Knox County, Kentucky during the campaign known as the Kentucky Confederate Offensive. The battle is considered the first Confederate victory in the commonwealth, and threw a scare into Federal commanders, who rushed troops to central Kentucky to try to repel the invasion, which was finally stopped at the Battle of Camp Wildcat in October.

== Background ==
=== Kentucky neutrality ===
During April 15, 1861, the day after the U.S. Army surrendered Fort Sumter to the Confederates, President Abraham Lincoln called upon the States remaining in the Union to provide volunteers to suppress the insurrection in the seven States which had seceded from the Union by that date. Pro-Confederate Kentucky Governor Beriah Magoffin refused to send troops, but since the majority of the members of the Kentucky General Assembly were pro-Union, Lincoln's call for volunteers did not prompt the State to secede. On May 16, a Kentucky legislative committee recommend that the State remain neutral in the conflict and Governor Magoffin proclaimed the State's neutrality on May 20.

In elections on August 5, 1861, Kentucky voters returned a veto-proof majority of pro-Union members to the Kentucky House of Representatives and Kentucky Senate. On August 6, 1861, Camp Dick Robinson, a Union camp, was established near Lexington, Kentucky. On September 2, 1861, the Kentucky General Assembly raised the U.S. flag over the Kentucky State Capitol at Frankfort, Kentucky.

=== Confederate movements ===
On September 3, 1861, Confederate Maj. Gen. Leonidas Polk ordered Brig. Gen. Gideon Pillow to seize Columbus, Kentucky on the Mississippi River before Union forces could do so. This ended Kentucky's neutrality, led to Union Brig. Gen. Ulysses S. Grant's seizure of Paducah, Kentucky on September 6, 1861, and other military movements and actions by both Union and Confederate armies in Kentucky soon afterwards.

Brig. Gen. Felix Zollicoffer's Confederates had moved from Tennessee to push from the Cumberland Gap into central Kentucky in an effort to gain control of that important border state. On September 14, 1861, ten days after his 5,400-man force left their base, Zollicoffer occupied the Cumberland Gap and took position at the Cumberland Ford (near present-day Pineville, Kentucky) to counter Unionist activity in the area. For much of the summer, Union sympathizers had been organizing and training recruits from Kentucky and eastern Tennessee at Camp Andrew Johnson near Barbourville, Kentucky. Zollicoffer was determined to seize this camp and eliminate the threat to the Confederate position. He also wanted to relieve pressure on the army of Albert S. Johnston and divert Union troops away from Johnston's command.

== Battle ==
In a heavy morning fog on September 19, 1861, Zollicoffer sent forward about 800 men under Col. Joel A. Battle. Camp Andrew Johnson had largely been vacated, with the recruits moved to nearby Camp Dick Robinson, where several thousand Federal troops were gathered under the command of Brig. Gen. George H. Thomas. As Battle's men approached the Camp Johnson, they encountered a force of 300 pro-Union Home Guards under Capt. Isaac J. Black, who hastily removed the planking from the bridge to prevent the Confederates from crossing it. Sharp skirmishing broke out, but Battle's superior numbers prevailed and Zollicoffer won a victory. His men seized the camp, destroyed the buildings, and captured the arms and equipment left behind by the retreating recruits.

== Aftermath ==
Black reported his casualties as 1 man killed, 1 wounded, and 13 captured. Fighting in the open, the attacking Confederates lost 7 men killed in the encounter.

Although Zollicoffer briefly withdrew to his camp at Cumberland Gap, he sent a detachment of his men to drive off another Union Home Guard force at a camp at Laurel Bridge, in Laurel County, Kentucky soon after the Battle of Barbourville. On September 28, another detachment seized 200 barrels of salt and destroyed the Goose Creek Salt Works in Clay County, Kentucky.

In response to Zollicoffer's actions, Union Brig. Gen. Thomas sent troops under Col. Theophilus T. Garrard to set up Camp Wildcat at Rockcastle Hills, near London, Kentucky, at Wildcat Mountain 30 miles (48 km) north of the salt works, to secure the ford on the Rockcastle River, and obstruct the Wilderness Road passing through the area. This set the stage for the Battle of Camp Wildcat on October 21, 1861 after Zollicoffer returned to the offensive on October 16.

== See also ==
- List of battles fought in Kentucky
