= Pleasant Grove, Tennessee =

Unincorporated community in Tennessee, US

Coordinates: 35.4867408°N 86.9855603°W

Pleasant Grove is an unincorporated community in Maury County, in the U.S. state of Tennessee.

== History ==
A post office called Pleasant Grove was established in 1827, and remained in operation until 1860. A variant name was "Pleasant Grove Depot". Besides the train depot, Pleasant Grove contained several commercial buildings including a gristmill.
