= Charles McDowell Jr. (journalist) =

American political writer, syndicated columnist (1926–2010)

Charles Rice McDowell Jr. (June 24, 1926 – November 5, 2010) was a long-time political writer and nationally syndicated columnist for the Richmond Times-Dispatch and panelist on PBS-TV's Washington Week in Review. McDowell appeared in an interview in Ken Burns' documentary The Congress; provided the character voice for Sam R. Watkins in Burns' documentary The Civil War; and provided character voice as well as consultation for Burns' documentary Baseball. McDowell was a Washington and Lee University alumnus and a member of Columbia's Graduate School of Journalism.

== Life ==
McDowell was born in Danville, Kentucky, on June 24, 1926. He was the son of Charles Rice McDowell Sr. and Catherine Frazier Feland. When he was young, the family moved to Lexington, Virginia, where the elder McDowell was a professor of law at Washington and Lee University. (His mother was the long-time secretary to the law dean; eventually, she was said to wield so much power that she effectively "was the dean of law.") The younger McDowell became an undergraduate there, majoring in English and graduating in 1948. He also graduated from the Columbia University School of Journalism.

== Journalism career ==
McDowell was a writer for the university student newspaper, The Columns (published during the summer session after World War II). He became editor-in-chief in his sophomore year. He wrote a weekly column called "Reporter at Large" and on July 31, 1946, wrote his first-ever column on national politics — reporting on a single day of a visit to the U.S. Senate Office Building. There he saw "the gentlemen of the press" "glancing significantly at one another" during a discussion of how a Democratic Congressman's gift of a $2,500 contribution from a Republican businessman had nothing to do with a "juicy war contract" which a constituent of the latter had received — as well as a speech about "the great injustice being done" to Wyoming's wool growers without federal subsidies. The student journalist's column had all the tone and style of McDowell's career to follow.Link to download The Columns, Aug. 2, 1946:

After graduate school, McDowell moved to Richmond, Virginia, and joined the staff of the Richmond Times-Dispatch, where he would remain his entire career, retiring in 1998. He covered local news and was then assigned to the State Capitol, where he reported on the General Assembly and state politics. In 1954, McDowell began to write a syndicated column that appeared three or four times per week and would span the remainder of his career. He was assigned to Washington, D.C., in 1965, and relocated to Alexandria. McDowell wrote three books: Campaign Fever, a journal of the 1964 presidential election; and two collections of humor columns, One Thing After Another (1960) and What Did You Have in Mind? (1963). He was also a panelist on PBS' "Washington Week in Review" for 18 years, beginning in 1978, and was a writer, narrator and host for other PBS programs, including "Summer of Judgment: The Watergate Hearings," "Richmond Memories" and "For the Record." McDowell also provided voice-overs for the productions The Civil War and Baseball by Ken Burns.

McDowell was inducted into the Virginia Communications Hall of Fame in 1988, and awarded the Fourth Estate Award by the National Press Club in 1996. He married Ann G. Webb of Ashland, Virginia. McDowell lived with his wife in Alexandria, Virginia, until they moved to Virginia Beach after his retirement. He died on November 5, 2010, at age 84, due to complications of a stroke, and is buried at Oak Grove Cemetery (Lexington, Virginia) in Lexington, Virginia.
