= Screamer, Tennessee =

Unincorporated community in Tennessee, US

Coordinates: 35°26′38″N 87°09′35″W

Screamer is an unincorporated community in Maury County, in the U.S. state of Tennessee.

Screamer was so named in the 1840s on account of the frequent screaming of cougars.
