= Bigbyville, Tennessee =

Unincorporated community in Tennessee, US

Bigbyville
- unincorporated community
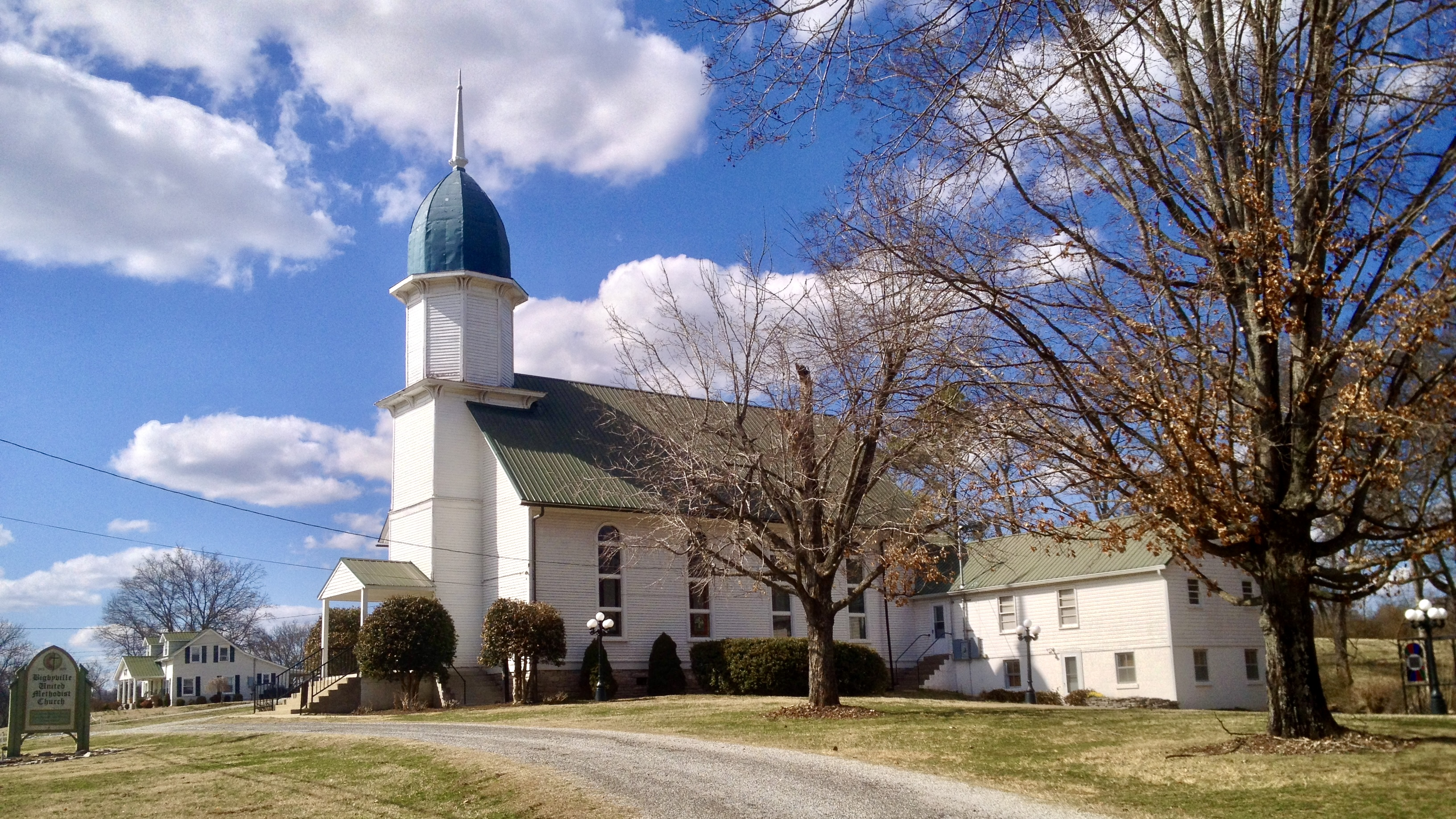
- Bigbyville United Methodist Church

- Location within the state of Tennessee Bigbyville (the United States)
- Coordinates: 35°31′14″N 87°04′48″W
- Country: United States
- State: Tennessee
- County: Maury
- Settled: 1807
- Time zone: UTC−6 (Central (CST))
  - Summer (DST): UTC−5 (CDT)

Bigbyville is an unincorporated community in Maury County, in the U.S. state of Tennessee.

== History ==
The first settlement at Bigbyville was made about 1807. A post office called Bigbyville was established in 1829, and remained in operation until 1903.

== Notable person ==
Felix Zollicoffer, a United States Congressman from Tennessee, was born in Bigbyville in 1812.
