= William Andrew Quarles =

American politician

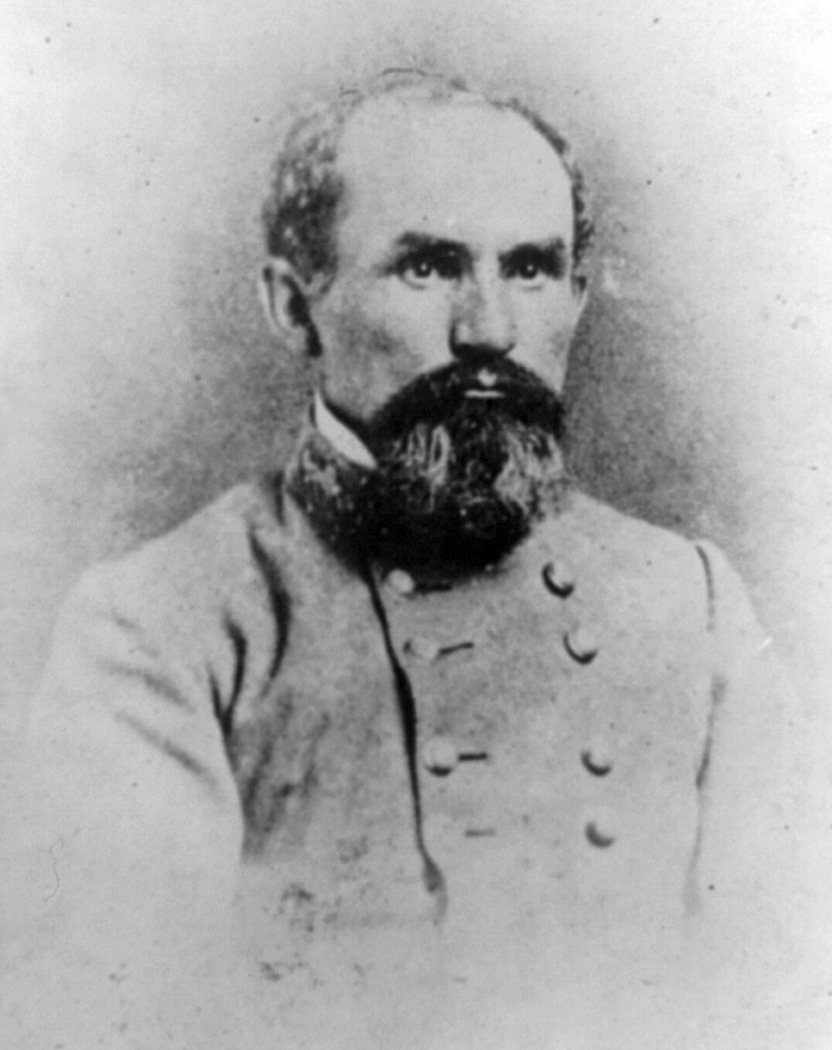
- Born: July 4, 1825; Louisa County, Virginia, US
- Died: December 28, 1893 (aged 68); Todd County, Kentucky, US
- Burial place: Flat Lick Cumberland Presbyterian Church Cemetery, Herndon, Kentucky
- Military career
- Allegiance: Confederate States of America
- Branch: Confederate States Army
- Service years: 1861–1865
- Rank: Brigadier General
- Conflicts: American Civil War Battle of Fort Donelson Battle of Pickett's Mill Second Battle of Franklin

William Andrew Quarles (July 4, 1825 – December 28, 1893) was a Tennessee lawyer, politician, railroad executive, and a general in the Confederate States Army during the American Civil War.

== Early life ==
William A. Quarles, the son of Garrett and Mary J. (Poindexter) Quarles, was born near Louisa Court House in Louisa County, Virginia. When he was five years old, his family moved to rural Christian County, Kentucky, and then later to Clarksville, Tennessee. He was educated at home as a youth and attended the University of Virginia until his father's untimely death forced him to return home to manage the family estate. He studied law and was admitted to the bar in 1848, and established a law practice in Clarksville. Interested in politics, he was a Democratic presidential elector in 1852, supporting Franklin Pierce's candidacy.

Quarles helped incorporate Stewart College in 1856. He was the state's bank inspector in 1858 and was judge of the circuit court for a year, filling in for an ill incumbent. Quarles was an unsuccessful candidate for the United States Congress from Tennessee in 1858. He was a delegate to the Democratic National Convention in both 1856 and 1860. Quarles joined the Freemasons and became a Master Mason in 1856. He was appointed President of the Memphis, Clarksville and Louisville Railway Company, and helped oversee the construction of railroad lines in Tennessee and Kentucky.

His brother, James Minor Quarles, was a United States Congressman representing Tennessee from 1859 until 1861 when the state seceded from the Union.

== Civil War ==
With the outbreak of the Civil War, Quarles organized the 42nd Tennessee Infantry and was commissioned on November 28, 1861, as its first colonel. His brother James would serve under Quarles for the rest of the war. In February 1862, Quarles and his men were present at the Battle of Fort Donelson, where they were among the thousands of men forced to surrender. He was sent north to the Johnson's Island prisoner-of-war camp in Ohio. After being sent to Vicksburg, Mississippi, in early August 1862 and formally exchanged, Quarles resumed command of his regiment.

Quarles was promoted on August 25, 1863, to brigadier general and given command of a brigade initially consisting of the 42nd, 46th, 48th, and 53rd Tennessee infantry regiments, serving in the division of Edward C. Walthall. Later augmented by two regiments from Louisiana, another from Tennessee, and an artillery battery, Quarles' brigade missed the Chattanooga Campaign as his brigade did not arrive in time for the defense of Missionary Ridge. He was ordered back to Mississippi after it seemed certain that Braxton Bragg's army would not be attacked again after retreating to Dalton, Georgia, but he and his men returned to Georgia after the start of the Atlanta campaign. At Pickett's Mill, Quarles was severely wounded.

After recovering, Quarles led his brigade into Tennessee when army commander John Bell Hood moved northward from Atlanta. He was wounded on November 30, 1864, at the Battle of Franklin while leading his brigade against the Union works, and two weeks later captured while recuperating from his wound in a nearby field hospital. Quarles spent the rest of the war as a Union prisoner. He was finally paroled and exchanged at Nashville in May 1865 following the cessation of hostilities.

== Postbellum ==
Quarles in 1887

Following the war, Quarles resumed his law career in Clarksville and was a trustee of the Tennessee Orphans Society in 1867. He was a member of the Methodist Episcopal Church, and continued his Masonic activities, becoming a Royal Arch Mason in 1865 and joining the Knights Templar in 1871. He was again a presidential elector in 1872, supporting Horace Greeley in his unsuccessful candidacy. Resuming his own political career, Quarles failed to garner enough support for the United States Senate in 1874, finishing well behind former President Andrew Johnson in balloting in the Tennessee legislature. He was subsequently elected to the State Senate, serving in the 39th (1875–77) and 45th (1887–89) General Assemblies as a Democrat. He was a delegate to the Democratic National Conventions of 1880 and 1884 and served on Democratic State Executive Committee in 1882.

Quarles was married three times—first to a cousin, Miss Poindexter, then to Alice Vivian, and the third marriage to yet another cousin, Mrs. Louisa (Meriwether) Barker, daughter of Dr. Charles Hunter Meriwether. Quarles had one son, William A.

Quarles died at his father-in-law's estate, "Meriville," in Todd County, Kentucky, and was buried in Flat Lick Presbyterian Church graveyard, Christian County, Kentucky.

== See also ==
- List of American Civil War generals (Confederate)
