= Jackson College (Tennessee) =

Jackson College was a college affiliated with the Presbyterian Church, located in Columbia, Tennessee.

== History ==
Jackson College was founded as the Manual Labor Academy at Spring Hill, Tennessee, in 1830. Its original enrollment was seven students. As part of the curriculum each student was required to work two hours per day at a manual task. It was thought that this manual labor was beneficial to the student. While at some schools students engaged in mechanical tasks, the Academy was not able to build shops or buy the tools necessary. The students, therefore, engaged in farming.

Some time around 1832, through an act of the legislature, the academy became Jackson College. During this time, the manual labor aspect of the academy was maintained. In 1837 the College moved to Columbia. At this point, the manual labor aspect of the curriculum that began with the original academy was abolished. During the American Civil War the college was burned, along with much of Columbia, by the Union Army. It is likely that it was at this time that the college ceased to exist, but the references available are not clear.

== Notable alumni ==
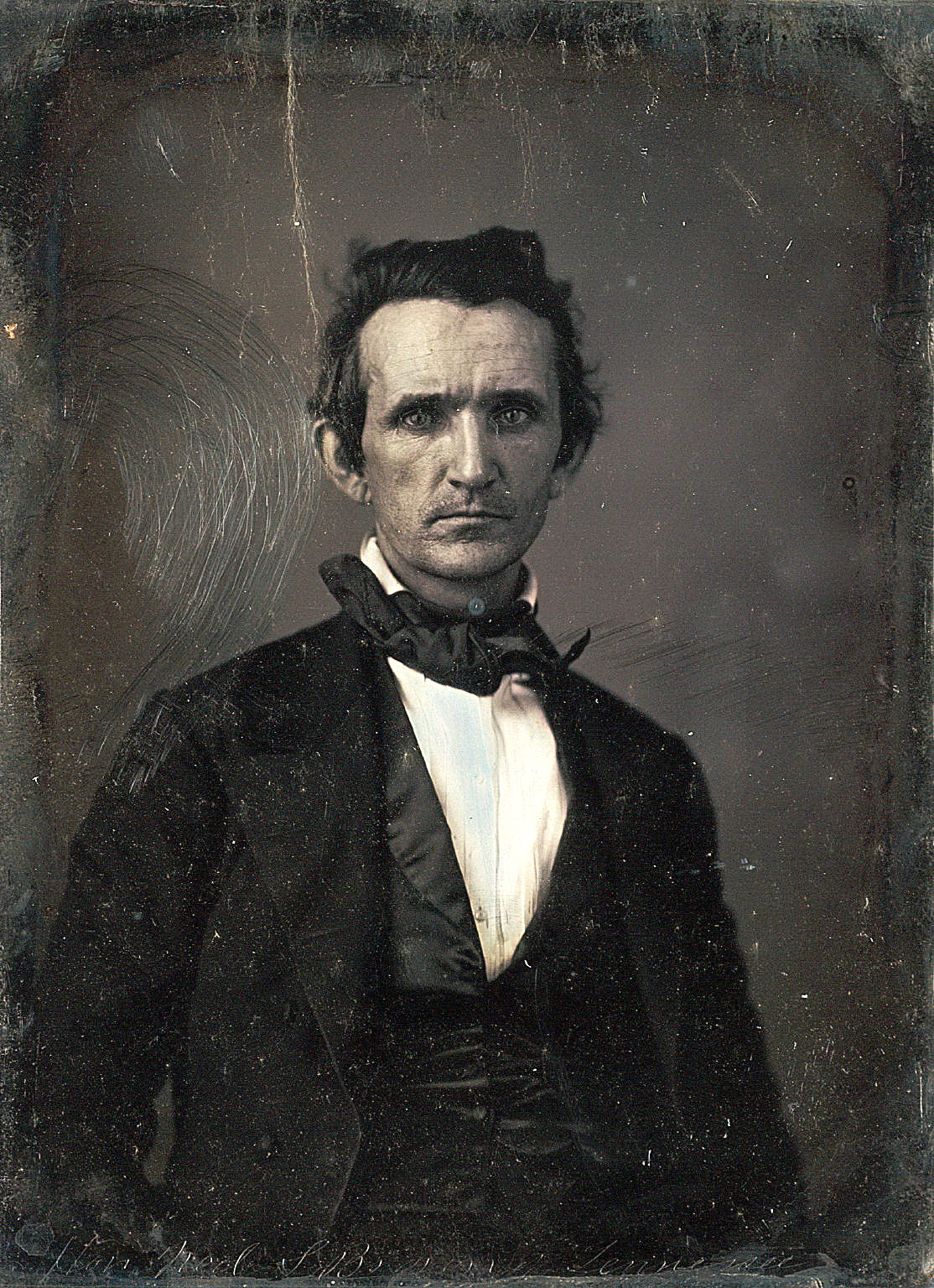
Neill Brown, 12th governor of Tennessee

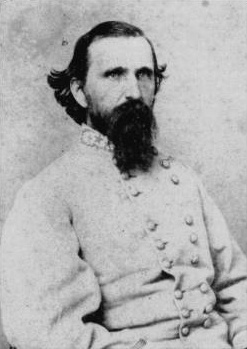
John Brown, 19th governor of Tennessee

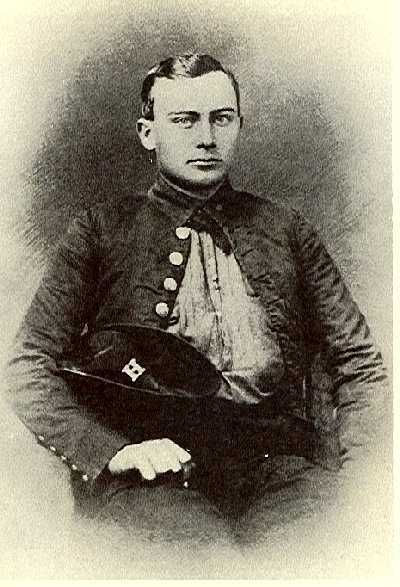
Sam Watkins, American writer and humorist

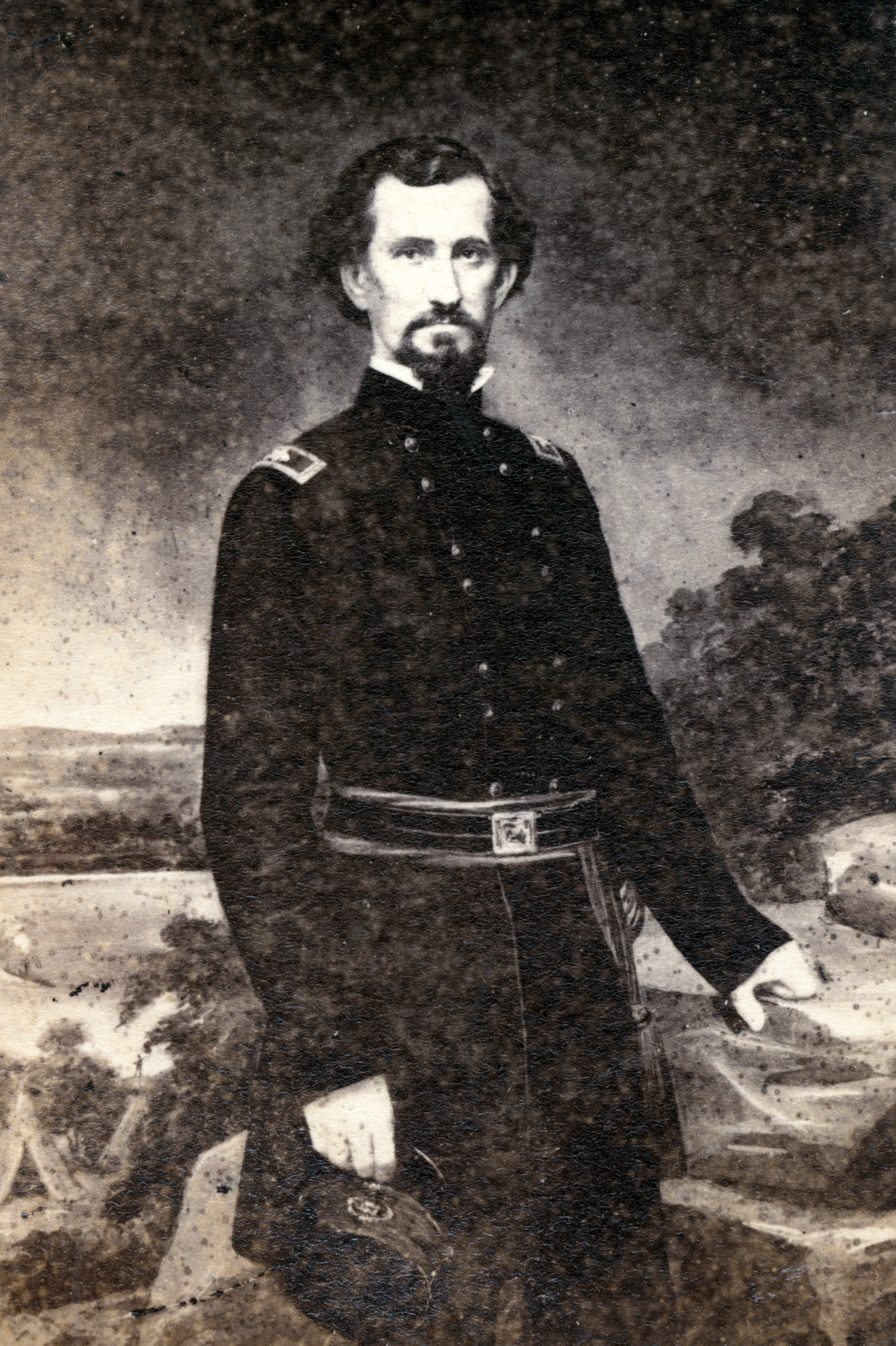
Felix Zollicoffer, Confederate general, American Civil War
