= James Minor Quarles =

American politician (1823–1901)

Member of the U.S. House of Representatives from Tennessee's 8th district
- In office March 4, 1859 – March 3, 1861
- Preceded by: Felix Zollicoffer
- Succeeded by: John W. Leftwich

Personal details
- Born: February 3, 1823 Louisa County, Virginia, U.S.
- Died: March 3, 1901 (aged 78) Nashville, Tennessee, U.S.
- Party: Opposition Party
- Spouse: Mary Walker Thomas Quarles
- Children: Robert Thomas Quarles; Eva Belle Quarles; Frances Quarles; Ellen Douglas Quarles; Lucy M. Quarles; Elizabeth Lewis Quarles; David Watson Quarles; Mary Walker Quarles; Elizabeth Thornton Quarles; William Andrew Quarles; James Minor Quarles; John Nicholas Quarles
- Profession: lawyer; politician; judge

James Minor Quarles (February 8, 1823 – March 3, 1901) was an American politician and a member of the United States House of Representatives for Tennessee's 8th congressional district.

== Biography ==
Quarles was born near Louisa Court House in Louisa County, Virginia, son of Garrett Minor and Mary Johnson Poindexter Quarles. He attended the common schools, and in 1833 moved to Kentucky with his father, who settled in Christian County. He completed preparatory studies, studied law, and was admitted to the bar in 1845. He commenced practice in Clarksville, Tennessee. He married Mary Walker Thomas and they had twelve children.

== Career ==
In 1853, Quarles was elected to the tenth judicial circuit, and he served until 1859 when he resigned, having been elected to the U.S. Thirty-sixth Congress as a member of the Opposition Party. He was a U.S. Representative from March 4, 1859, to March 3, 1861.

During the Civil War, Quarles served in the Confederate Army brigade of his brother, Brigadier General William A. Quarles, until the close of the war. He then moved to Nashville, Tennessee, in 1872 and continued the practice of law. He was elected a judge of the criminal court in 1878, and he served until 1882 when he resigned and again resumed his law practice.

== Death ==
Quarles died in Nashville and is interred at Mount Olivet Cemetery.
