= Campbells Station, Tennessee =

Unincorporated community in Tennessee, US

Coordinates: 35.4467°N 86.9889°W

Campbell Station is an unincorporated community in Maury County, in the U.S. state of Tennessee.

== History ==
The community has the name of the local Campbell family of pioneer settlers. A variant name was Fountain Creek. A post office called Fountain Creek was established in 1826, and remained in operation until 1931.
