= Alabama State Route 127 =

State highway in Alabama, United States

State Route 127

Route information
- Maintained by ALDOT
- Length: 13.510 mi (21.742 km)

Major junctions
- South end: SR 99 in Athens
- North end: SR 166 at the Tennessee state line at Bethel, TN

Location
- Country: United States
- State: Alabama
- Counties: Limestone

Highway system
- Alabama State Highway System; Interstate; US; State
← SR 126	→ SR 128

State Route 127 (SR 127) is a 13.510-mile (21.742 km) state highway that serves the north-central areas of Limestone County in the north-central part of the U.S. state of Alabama. SR 127 intersects SR 99 at its southern terminus in Athens and continues as Tennessee State Route 166 (SR 166) upon entering Tennessee at its northern terminus.

== Route description ==
SR 127 begins at an intersection with SR 99 (running concurrently with Elm Street) opposite Jefferson Street in northern Athens. From this point, the highway travels in a northerly direction before turning in a northwesterly direction north of Elkmont. SR 127 continues in its northwesterly path in crossing the Elk River prior to reaching the Tennessee state line and continues as SR 166.

== Major intersections ==
The entire route is in Limestone County.

Location	mi	km	Destinations	Notes
Athens	0.000	0.000	SR 99 (Elm Street) / Jefferson Street	Southern terminus
	13.510	21.742	SR 166 north (Bethel Road) – Bethel, Pulaski	Tennessee state line; northern terminus
1.000 mi = 1.609 km; 1.000 km = 0.621 mi
