= Tennessee State Route 244 =

State highway in Tennessee, United States

State Route 244
- Boonshill–Petersburg Road
- SR 244 highlighted in red

Route information
- Maintained by TDOT
- Length: 9.1 mi (14.6 km)
- Existed: July 1, 1983–present

Major junctions
- South end: US 64 in Boonshill
- North end: US 431 in Petersburg

Location
- Country: United States
- State: Tennessee
- Counties: Lincoln

Highway system
- Tennessee State Routes; Interstate; US; State
← SR 243	→ SR 245

State Route 244 (SR 244), also known as Boonshill–Petersburg Road, is a 9.1-mile-long (14.6 km) north–south state highway in northern Lincoln County, Tennessee, that connects the community of Boonshill with the town of Petersburg.

== Route description ==
SR 244 begins in the Boonshill community at an intersection with US 64/SR 15. It heads northeast through farmland and hilly terrain to pass by Unity School before passing through rural areas for several miles before coming to an end at the southern edge of the Petersburg city limits at an intersection with US 431/SR 50. The entire route SR 244 is a rural two-lane highway.

== Major intersections ==
The entire route is in Lincoln County.

Location	mi	km	Destinations	Notes
Boonshill	0.0	0.0	US 64 (Pulaski Highway/SR 15) to I-65 – Pulaski, Fayetteville	Southern terminus
Petersburg	9.1	14.6	US 431 (Lewisburg Highway/SR 50) – Lewisburg, Downtown, Fayetteville	Northern terminus
1.000 mi = 1.609 km; 1.000 km = 0.621 mi
