= Scotts Mill, Tennessee =

Unincorporated community in Tennessee, US

Coordinates: 35°29′59″N 87°08′54″W

Scotts Mill is an unincorporated community in Maury County, in the U.S. state of Tennessee.

== History ==
Variant names were "Ettaton", "New York", and "Scott Mill". A post office called Ettaton was established in 1884, and remained in operation until 1901. The community's inland location away from railroads hindered its growth.
