= Samuel R. Watkins =

American writer and humorist (1839–1901)

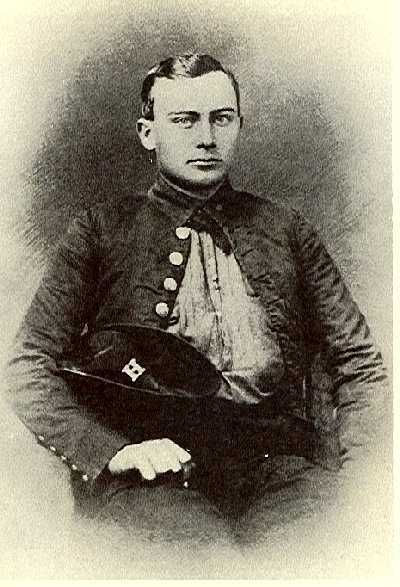
- Watkins in uniform, c. 1861
- Born: Samuel Rush Watkins; June 26, 1839; Mount Pleasant, Tennessee
- Died: July 20, 1901 (aged 62); Maury County, Tennessee
- Resting place: Zion Cemetery, Maury County, Tennessee, U.S. 35°35′55.2″N 87°08′42.0″W
- Education: Jackson College
- Occupations: Clerk; soldier; farmer
- Spouse: Virginia Mayes Watkins (m. 1865)
- Writing career
- Pen name: Sam. R. Watkins
- Years active: 1881–1882
- Period: 1881–1900
- Notable work: Co. Aytch
- Military career
- Allegiance: Confederate States
- Branch: Confederate States Army
- Service years: 1861–1865
- Rank: Corporal
- Units: Company H, 1st Tennessee Infantry Regiment
- Conflicts: American Civil War: Battle of Cheat Mountain; Battle of Shiloh; Siege of Corinth; Battle of Perryville; Battle of Stones River (WIA); Battle of Chickamauga; Chattanooga campaign; Atlanta campaign; Battle of Rocky Face Ridge; Battle of Resaca; Battle of Kennesaw Mountain; Battle of Atlanta (WIA); Franklin Campaign; Battle of Nashville; Battle of Bentonville

Samuel Rush Watkins (June 26, 1839 – July 20, 1901) was an American writer and humorist. He fought through the entire American Civil War and saw action in many battles in the western theater. Today, he is best known for his memoir Co. Aytch (1882), which recounts his life as a soldier in the 1st Tennessee Infantry Regiment.

== Life ==
In May 1861, 21-year-old Sam Watkins of Maury County, Tennessee, rushed to join the army when his state left the Union. He became part of Company H (or Co. "Aytch," as he called it), 1st Tennessee Infantry Regiment, fought from Shiloh to Nashville, and acted as one of only seven men who remained in the company when it was surrendered to U.S. Major-General W. T. Sherman in North Carolina, April 1865. Watkins settled on a farm and died in 1901, aged 62, and was buried in Zion Cemetery in Maury County, Tennessee, with full military honors. Camp No. 29 (established 1986) of the Sons of Confederate Veterans in Columbia, Tennessee, is named after him.

== Co. Aytch ==
In 1881, with a "house full of young 'rebels' clustering about my elbows," Watkins began to chronicle his experiences in the First Tennessee Regiment. Co. Aytch is considered to be one of the great memoirs written by a soldier of the field. Originally published as a serial newspaper column from 1881 to 1882 in The Columbia Herald, his stories were collected and printed in book form in 1882. The charming prose captures the experience of the common foot soldier, from the hardships of camp life to the horrors of battle, the camaraderie of a unit to the loss of a brother, the pride in one's state to the devastation of defeat.

== Cultural legacy ==
Watkins is featured and quoted in Ken Burns' 1990 documentary titled The Civil War and in the film titled Civil War: The Untold Story (See specific quotes from Watkins in Wikiquotes .)

The song "Kennesaw Line" by Don Oja-Dunaway tells a heart-breaking vignette of the Battle of Kennesaw Mountain on the morning of June 27, 1864, from the perspective of Sam Watkins, with part of the lyrics directly paraphrasing his description from the book Co. Aytch (see the section entitled "Dead Angle").

== See also ==
- American literary regionalism
- American realism
- List of humorists
- The Civil War (1990)
