= Sawdust, Tennessee =

- Unincorporated community
- Location within Tennessee Location within the United States
- Coordinates: 35°40′05″N 87°11′24″W
- Country: United States
- State: Tennessee
- County: Maury
- Elevation: 607 ft (185 m)
- Time zone: UTC-6 (Central (CST))
  - Summer (DST): UTC-5 (CDT)
- Area code: 931
- GNIS feature ID: 1307030

Sawdust (also Blockers Shop, Saw Dust Valley, Sawdust Valley, Winnsboro) is an unincorporated community in Maury County, Tennessee, United States.
