= Hampshire, Tennessee =

Coordinates: 35°35′48″N 87°17′35″W

Hampshire
- Unincorporated community
- Motto(s): Neighbors oe'r the Hills, "A Little Place with Lots of Heart"
- Interactive map of Hampshire
- Country: United States
- State: Tennessee
- County: Maury
- Founder: John Hunter

Area
  - Total: 185.57 km^{2} (71.65 sq mi)
  - Land: 185.57 km^{2} (71.65 sq mi)
  - Water: 0 km^{2} (0 sq mi) 0%
- Elevation: 184.09 m (604.0 ft)

Population
  - Total: 1,473
  - Density: 7.938/km^{2} (20.56/sq mi)
- Time zone: UTC-6 (CST)
- Zip code: 38461
- Area code: 931

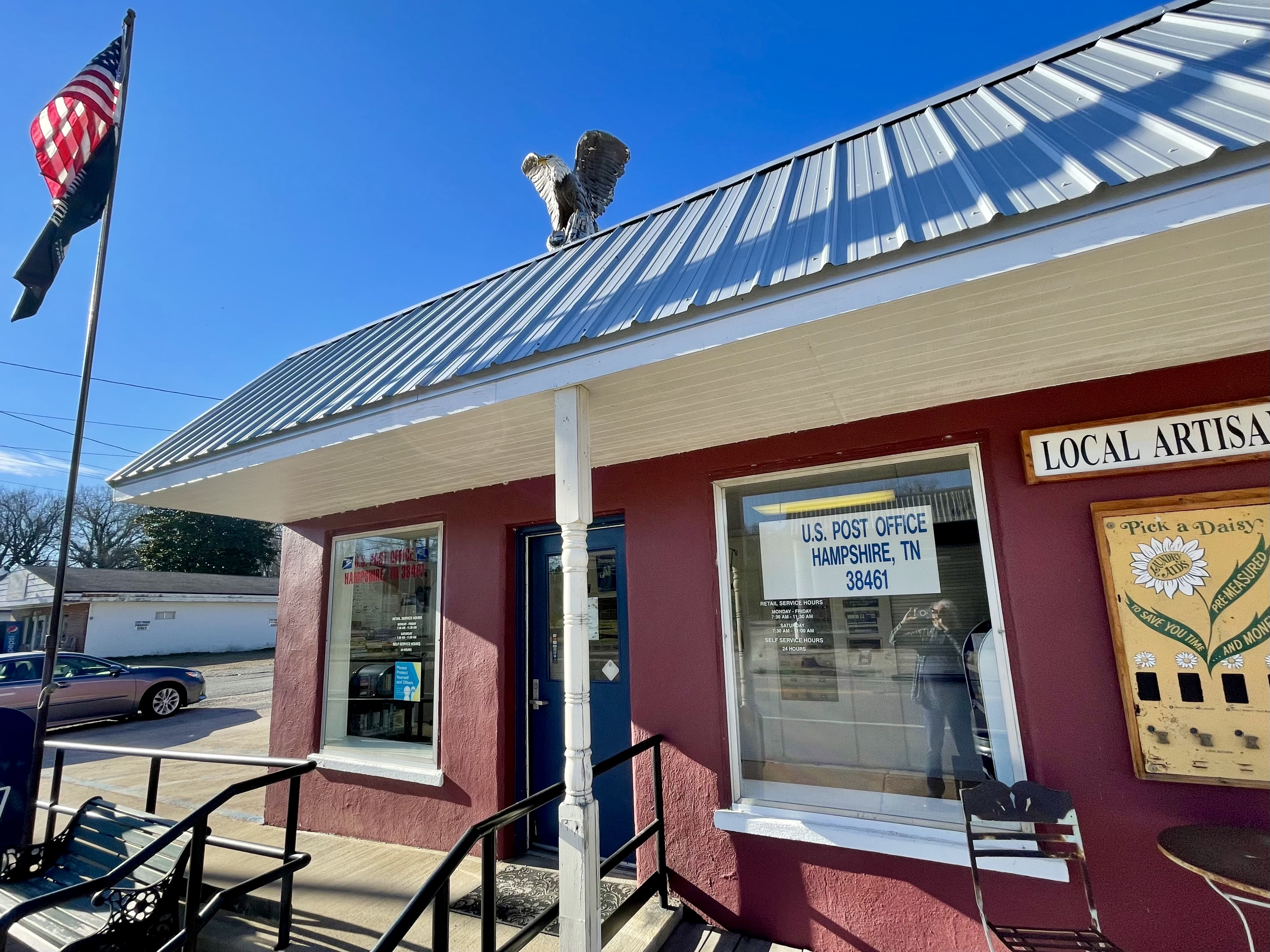
Hampshire Post office February 2022

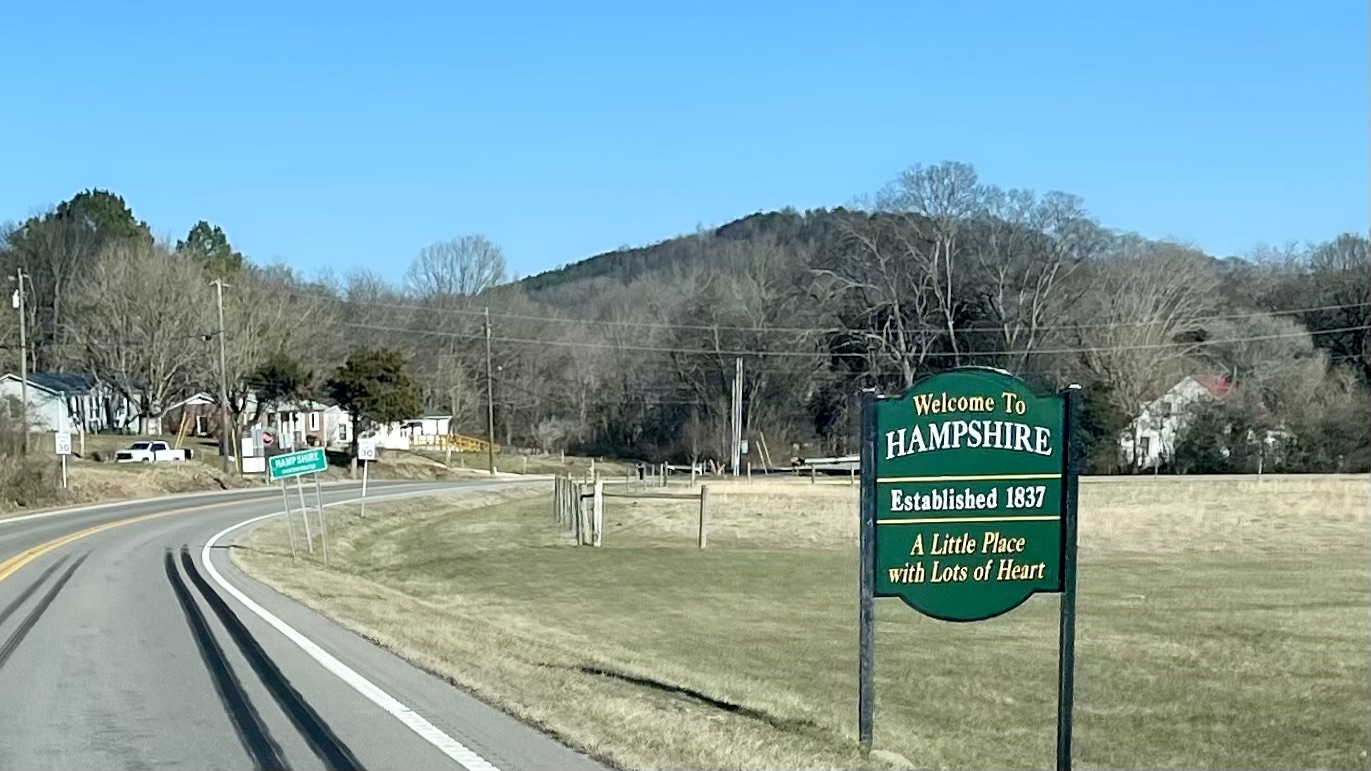

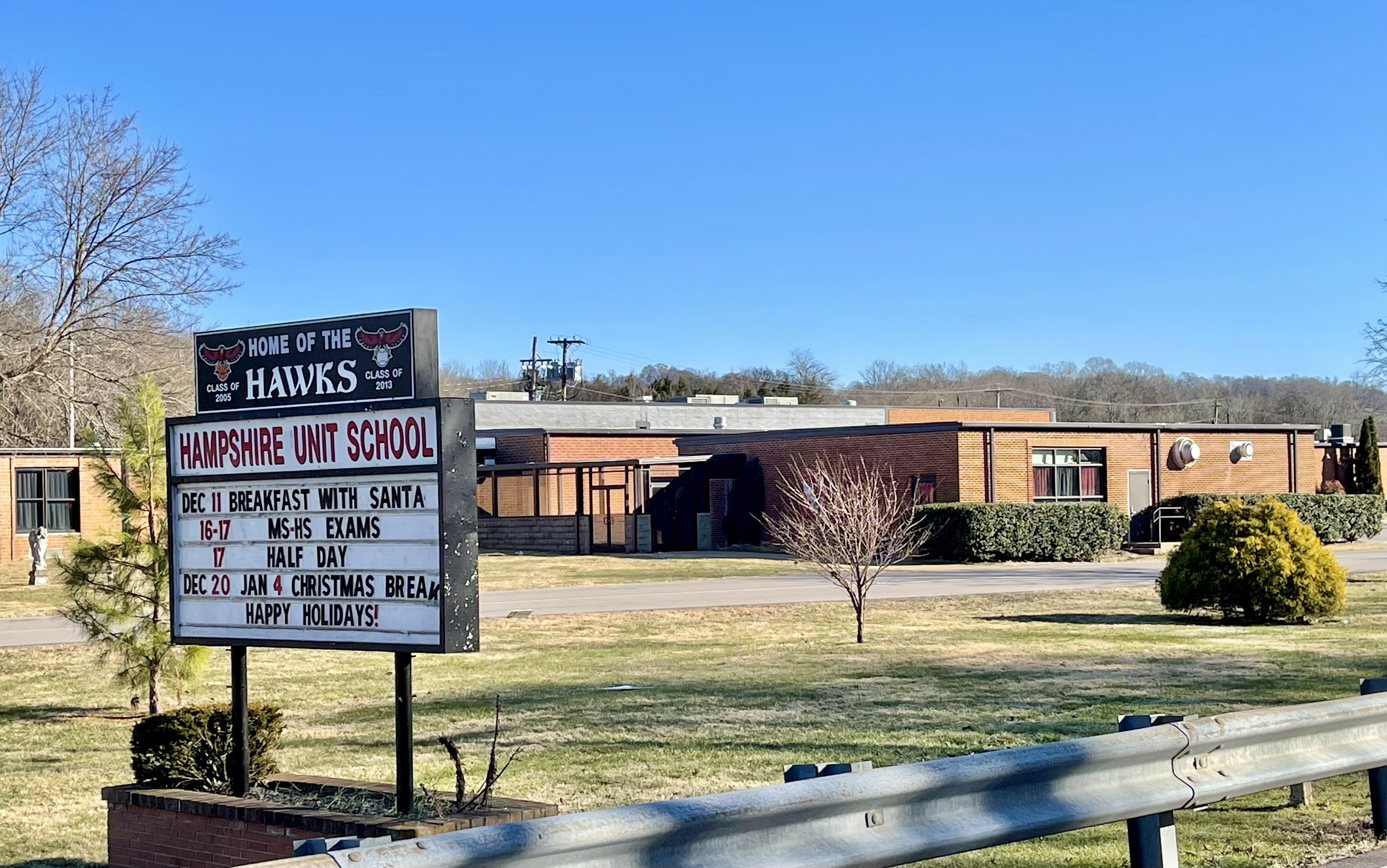
Hampshire Unit School

Hampshire is an unincorporated community in Maury County, Tennessee, United States.

== Education ==
Hampshire Unit School, enrolling kindergarten through grade 12, is operated as a unit of Maury County Public Schools. Hampshire Unit School is one of the smaller schools in the county, notably not enough willing students to maintain an American football team (students who want to play football can play at Mount Pleasant’s schools).

== Police protection ==
Since Hampshire is unincorporated, no government body represents the town personally to provide a police service. The Maury County Sheriff's Office maintains all law enforcement duties. Constables also have concurrent jurisdiction with the sheriff; however, they rarely exercise such authority.

== Fire protection ==
Hampshire is protected by the Hampshire Fire Department, division of the Maury County Fire Department.

== Events ==
Hampshire recently began its annual "Hampshire Jubilee and Festival," which includes vendors, food trucks, and live music.

== Notable residents ==
- Wynn Varble
