= Maury County, Tennessee =

County in Tennessee, United States

- County
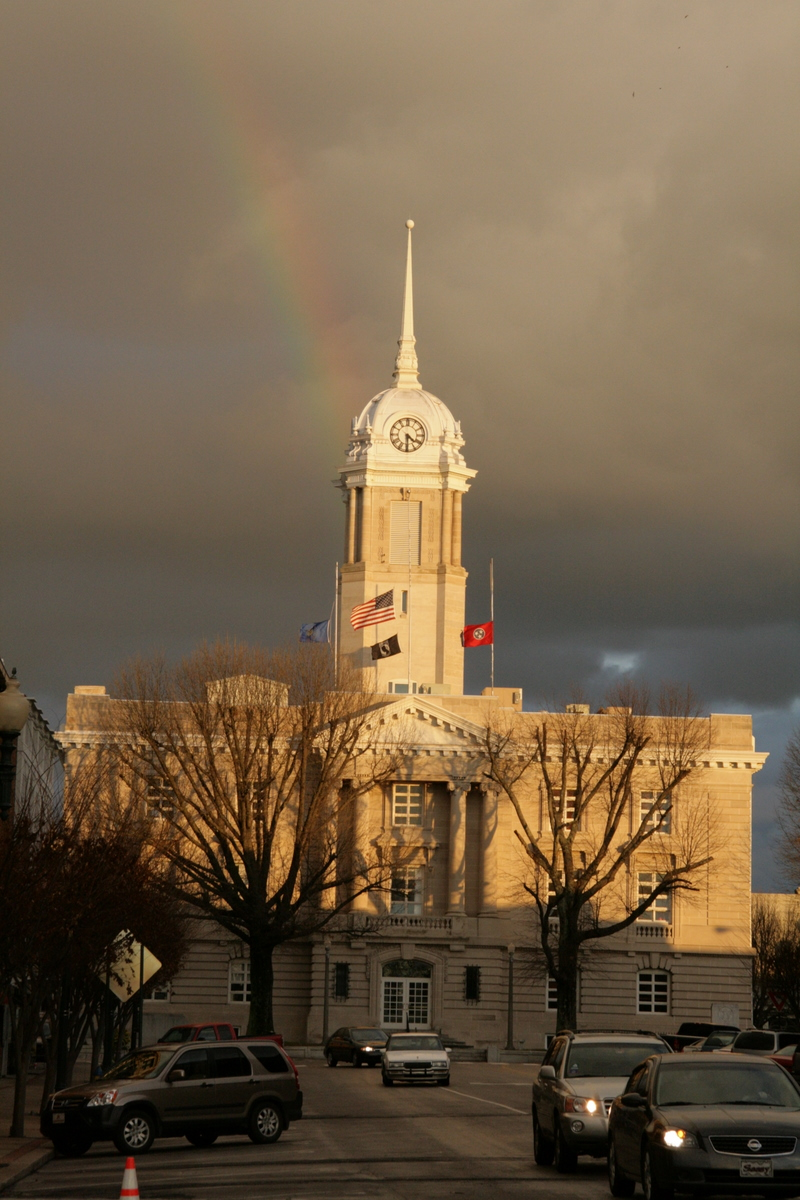
- Maury County Courthouse in Columbia

- Flag Seal

- Location within the U.S. state of Tennessee
- Coordinates: 35°37′N 87°05′W
- Country: United States
- State: Tennessee
- Founded: 1807
- Named for: Abram Poindexter Maury, Sr.
- Seat: Columbia
- Largest city: Spring Hill

Government
  - Mayor: Sheila Butt (R)

Area
  - Total: 616 sq mi (1,600 km^{2})
  - Land: 613 sq mi (1,590 km^{2})
  - Water: 2.4 sq mi (6.2 km^{2}) 0.4%

Population (2020)
  - Total: 100,974
  - Estimate (2025): 118,131 ▲
  - Density: 165/sq mi (63.6/km^{2})
- Time zone: UTC−6 (Central)
  - Summer (DST): UTC−5 (CDT)
- Congressional district: 5th
- Website: www.maurycounty-tn.gov

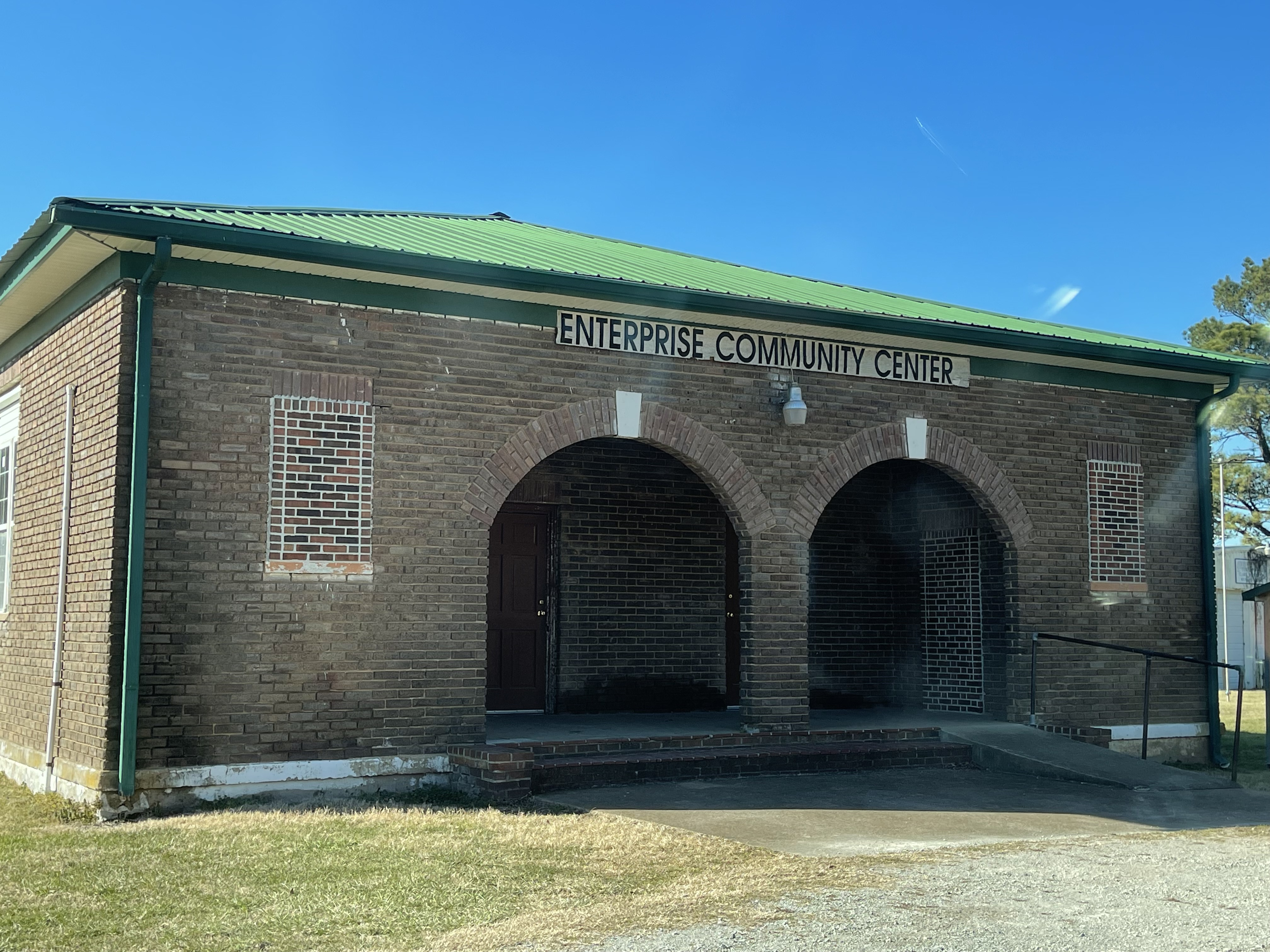
Enterprise Community Center in 2022

Maury County (/ˈmʌri/ MURR-ee) is a county located in the U.S. state of Tennessee, in the Middle Tennessee region. As of the 2020 census, the population was 100,974. Its county seat is Columbia. Maury County is part of the Nashville metropolitan area.

== History ==
The county was formed in 1807 from Williamson County and Native American lands. Maury County was named in honor of Abram Maury Sr., a member of the Tennessee state senate from Williamson County (who was the father of Major Abram Poindexter Maury of Williamson County, later a congressman; and an uncle of Commodore Matthew Fontaine Maury).

The rich soil of Maury County led to a thriving agricultural sector, starting in the 19th century. The county was part of a 41-county region that became known and legally defined as Middle Tennessee. In the antebellum era, planters in Maury County relied on the labor of enslaved African Americans to raise and process cotton, tobacco, and livestock (especially dairy cattle). Racial violence was less than in some areas, but the county had five documented lynchings in the period from 1877 to 1950, of which three took place in the early 20th century.

With the mechanization of agriculture, particularly from the 1930s, the need for farm labor in the county was reduced. Also, many African Americans moved to northern and midwestern industrial cities in the 20th century to escape Jim Crow conditions and for employment opportunities, particularly during the Great Migration. This movement out of the county continued after World War II. Other changes have led to increased population since the late 20th century, and the county has led the state in beef cattle production.

=== Columbia race riot of 1946 ===
On the night of February 26–27, 1946, a disturbance known as the "Columbia Race Riot" took place in Columbia, the county seat. The national press called it the first "major racial confrontation" after the Second World War. It marked a new spirit of resistance by African-American veterans and others following their participation in World War II, which they believed had earned them their full rights as citizens, despite Jim Crow laws.

James Stephenson, an African-American Navy veteran, was with his mother at a store, where she learned that a radio she had left for repair had been sold. When she complained, the white repair apprentice, Billy Fleming, struck her. Stephenson had been a welterweight on the Navy boxing team and retaliated by hitting Fleming, who broke a window. Both Stephenson and his mother were arrested, and Fleming's father convinced the sheriff to charge them with attempted murder. When whites learned that Fleming had gone to a hospital for treatment, a mob gathered. A risk arose that the Stephensons would be lynched.

Julius Blair, a 76-year-old black store owner, arranged to have the Stephensons released to his custody. He drove them out of town for their protection. When the mob did not disperse, about 100 African-American men began to patrol their neighborhood, located south of the courthouse square, determined to resist. Four police officers were shot and wounded when they entered "Mink Slide", the name given to the African-American business district, also known as "The Bottom". Following the attack on the police, the city government requested state troopers, who were sent and soon outnumbered the black patrollers. The state troopers began ransacking black businesses and rounding up African Americans. They cut phone service to Mink Slide, but the owner of a funeral home managed to call Nashville and ask for help from the NAACP. The county jail was soon overcrowded with black "suspects". Police questioned them for days without counsel. Two black men were killed and one wounded, allegedly while "trying to escape" during a transfer. About 25 black men were eventually charged with rioting and attempted murder.

The NAACP sent Thurgood Marshall as the lead attorney to defend Stephenson and the other defendants. He gained a change of venue, but only to another small town, where trials took place throughout the summer of 1946. Marshall was assisted by two local attorneys, Zephaniah Alexander Looby, originally from the British West Indies, and Maurice Weaver, a white activist from Nashville. Marshall was also preparing litigation for education and voting-rights cases.

Marshall gained acquittals for 23 of the black defendants, even with an all-white jury. At the last murder trials in November 1946, Marshall won also acquittal for Rooster Bill Pillow, and a reduction in the sentence of Papa Kennedy, allowing him to go free on bail.

== Geography ==
According to the U.S. Census Bureau, the county has a total area of 616 square miles (1,600 km^{2}), of which 2.4 square miles (6.2 km^{2}) (0.4%) are covered by water.

=== Adjacent counties ===
- Williamson County (north)
- Marshall County (east)
- Giles County (south)
- Lawrence County (southwest)
- Lewis County (west)
- Hickman County (northwest)

=== National protected area ===
- Natchez Trace Parkway (part)

=== State protected areas ===
- Duck River Complex State Natural Area
- James K. Polk Home (state historic site)
- Stillhouse Hollow Falls State Natural Area
- Williamsport Wildlife Management Area
- Yanahli Wildlife Management Area

== Demographics ==
Historical population
Census	Pop.	Note	%±
1810	10,359		—
1820	22,141		113.7%
1830	27,665		24.9%
1840	28,186		1.9%
1850	29,520		4.7%
1860	32,498		10.1%
1870	36,289		11.7%
1880	39,904		10.0%
1890	38,112		−4.5%
1900	42,703		12.0%
1910	40,456		−5.3%
1920	35,403		−12.5%
1930	34,016		−3.9%
1940	40,357		18.6%
1950	40,368		0.0%
1960	41,699		3.3%
1970	43,376		4.0%
1980	51,095		17.8%
1990	54,812		7.3%
2000	69,498		26.8%
2010	80,956		16.5%
2020	100,974		24.7%
2025 (est.)	118,131	▲	17.0%
U.S. Decennial Census; 1790–1960 1900–1990; 1990–2000 2010–2020

=== Racial and ethnic composition ===
Maury County, Tennessee – Racial and ethnic composition Note: the US Census treats Hispanic/Latino as an ethnic category. This table excludes Latinos from the racial categories and assigns them to a separate category. Hispanics/Latinos may be of any race.
Race / ethnicity (NH = Non-Hispanic)	Pop 1980	Pop 1990	Pop 2000	Pop 2010	Pop 2020	% 1980	% 1990	% 2000	% 2010	% 2020
White alone (NH)	42,285	45,662	56,327	64,919	76,182	82.76%	83.31%	81.05%	80.19%	75.45%
Black or African American alone (NH)	8,371	8,597	9,821	10,076	11,241	16.38%	15.68%	14.13%	12.45%	11.13%
Native American or Alaska Native alone (NH)	43	70	181	232	248	0.08%	0.13%	0.26%	0.29%	0.25%
Asian alone (NH)	54	153	230	482	934	0.11%	0.28%	0.33%	0.60%	0.92%
Native Hawaiian or Pacific Islander alone (NH)	x	x	12	21	45	x	x	0.02%	0.03%	0.04%
Other race alone (NH)	7	7	74	62	383	0.01%	0.01%	0.11%	0.08%	0.38%
Mixed race or Multiracial (NH)	x	x	589	1,255	4,281	x	x	0.85%	1.55%	4.24%
Hispanic or Latino (any race)	335	323	2,264	3,909	7,660	0.66%	0.59%	3.26%	4.83%	7.59%
Total	51,095	54,812	69,498	80,956	100,974	100.00%	100.00%	100.00%	100.00%	100.00%

=== 2020 census ===
As of the 2020 census, 100,974 people, 39,987 households, and 25,951 families resided in the county.

The racial makeup of the county was 77.1% White, 11.2% Black or African American, 0.4% American Indian and Alaska Native, 0.9% Asian, <0.1% Native Hawaiian and Pacific Islander, 3.4% from some other race, and 6.9% from two or more races. Hispanic or Latino residents of any race comprised 7.6% of the population.

The median age was 39.3 years; 22.9% of residents were under the age of 18 and 17.3% were 65 years of age or older, and there were 93.9 males for every 100 females and 91.6 males for every 100 females age 18 and over.

62.5% of residents lived in urban areas, while 37.5% lived in rural areas.

There were 39,987 households in the county, of which 30.8% had children under the age of 18 living in them. Of all households, 49.3% were married-couple households, 17.1% were households with a male householder and no spouse or partner present, and 27.1% were households with a female householder and no spouse or partner present. About 26.1% of all households were made up of individuals and 10.6% had someone living alone who was 65 years of age or older.

There were 43,143 housing units, of which 7.3% were vacant. Among occupied housing units, 68.6% were owner-occupied and 31.4% were renter-occupied. The homeowner vacancy rate was 1.6% and the rental vacancy rate was 8.2%.

=== 2010 census ===
As of the census of 2010, 80,932 people and 33,332 households were residing in the county. The population density was 132 people per square mile (51 people/km^{2}). There were 37,470 housing units at an average density of 61 units per square mile (24/km^{2}). The racial makeup of the county was 84.4% White, 11.9% African American, 0.5% Native American, 1.0% Asian, 0.1% Pacific Islander, 1.44% from other races, and 2.1% from two or more races. About 5.8% of the population were Hispanics or Latinos of any race.

Of the 26,444 households, 34.8% had children under 18 living with them, 55.9% were married couples living together, 12.9% had a female householder with no husband present, and 27.1% were not families. About 23.2% of all households were made up of individuals, and 8.8% had someone living alone who was 65 or older. The average household size was 2.58, and the average family size was 3.03.

In the county, the age distribution was 26.2% under 18, 8.7% from 18 to 24, 29.8% from 25 to 44, 23.2% from 45 to 64, and 12.0% who were 65 or older. The median age was 36 years. For every 100 females, there were 94.60 males. For every 100 females 18 and over, there were 90.30 males.

The median income for a household in the county was $41,591, and for a family was $48,010. Males had a median income of $37,675 versus $23,334 for females. The per capita income for the county was $19,365. About 8.30% of families and 10.90% of the population were below the poverty line, including 14.50% of those under 18 and 12.10% of those 65 or over.

Declines in population and population growth occurred from 1900 to 1930, and from 1940 to 1970. These periods related to the migration of people from rural to urban areas for work, especially as mechanization reduced the need for agricultural laborers. In addition, these times related to the Great Migration of African Americans out of the Jim Crow South to northern and midwestern industrial cities for more opportunities. The African-American population became highly urbanized. Expansion of the railroad, auto. and steel industries provided new work opportunities in the early 20th century.

== Transportation ==
Interstate 65 runs along the eastern portion of Maury County for about 18 miles (29 km), bypassing Columbia and Spring Hill. State Route 396 is a short controlled-access highway that connects I-65 to Spring Hill. U.S. Route 31, which parallels I-65 its entire length through Tennessee, runs through Columbia and Spring Hill, and U.S. Route 431 runs for a short distance in the northeastern corner of the county. The northern terminus of U.S. Route 43 and the eastern terminus of U.S. Route 412 are both located in Columbia. Other major state routes include 6, 7, 20, 50, and 99. Secondary state routes include 166, 243, 245, 246, 247, and 373.

The Maury County Airport is a county-owned public-use airport located 2 nautical miles (3.7 km; 2.3 mi) northeast of the central business district of Mount Pleasant and 8 nautical miles (15 km; 9.2 mi) southwest of Columbia.

== Education ==
The Maury County Public Schools district operates public schools in the entire county.

== Communities ==
=== Cities ===
- Columbia (county seat)
- Mount Pleasant
- Spring Hill (partly in Williamson County)

=== Unincorporated communities ===
- Ashwood
- Bigbyville
- Campbells Station
- Culleoka
- Fly
- Fountain Heights
- Hampshire
- Hopewell
- Pleasant Grove
- Santa Fe
- Sawdust
- Scotts Mill
- Screamer
- Silver Creek
- Williamsport

== Notable people ==
- Cordie Cheek (1916–1933) – 17-year-old black youth lynched in 1933 by a mob including county officials, after being falsely accused of rape
- James P. Eagle (1837–1904) – 16th governor of Arkansas
- Rufus Estes (1857–1939), former slave, luxury railway-car chef
- George Rufus Kenamore (1846–1928), Missouri merchant, government official, and politician
- James K. Polk (1795–1849), 11th President of the United States
- VanLeer Polk (1856–1907), Tennessee state senator and diplomat
- Samuel R. Watkins (1839–1901) – author of Co. Aytch (1882)

== Politics ==
A former Solid South county in historically-Democratic Middle Tennessee, Maury County voted Democratic at the presidential level for the bulk of the 20th century, making exceptions for segregationist George Wallace in 1968, the 49-state GOP landslides of 1972 (Richard Nixon) and 1984 (Ronald Reagan), and Republican George H. W. Bush in 1988. However, like the vast majority of counties in Tennessee, Maury County is today a Republican stronghold, with the last Democratic presidential candidate to win the county being Bill Clinton of neighboring state Arkansas in 1996 and the last to be competitive there being Tennessean Al Gore (who lost the county by just over 3%) four years later. Donald Trump's 71.7% vote share and 44.6% margin of victory in 2024 constitute the best county-wide performance for a Republican presidential candidate in Maury's history.

United States presidential election results for Maury County, Tennessee
Year	Republican		Democratic		Third party(ies)	
Year	No.	%	No.	%	No.	%
1912	615	18.30%	2,309	68.70%	437	13.00%
1916	720	24.61%	2,169	74.13%	37	1.26%
1920	1,379	33.53%	2,693	65.48%	41	1.00%
1924	844	21.40%	3,000	76.06%	100	2.54%
1928	1,362	27.16%	3,652	72.84%	0	0.00%
1932	535	13.54%	3,392	85.83%	25	0.63%
1936	497	11.49%	3,809	88.07%	19	0.44%
1940	634	12.23%	4,529	87.33%	23	0.44%
1944	747	13.39%	4,814	86.29%	18	0.32%
1948	895	15.88%	2,906	51.57%	1,834	32.55%
1952	3,582	32.58%	7,377	67.09%	36	0.33%
1956	2,853	29.39%	6,662	68.64%	191	1.97%
1960	4,133	37.99%	6,615	60.81%	131	1.20%
1964	4,605	37.38%	7,716	62.62%	0	0.00%
1968	3,048	20.88%	3,401	23.30%	8,148	55.82%
1972	7,371	66.28%	3,262	29.33%	488	4.39%
1976	5,327	37.34%	8,747	61.32%	191	1.34%
1980	6,637	44.16%	7,957	52.94%	436	2.90%
1984	9,008	56.18%	6,950	43.35%	75	0.47%
1988	8,397	56.78%	6,280	42.47%	111	0.75%
1992	7,440	36.37%	9,997	48.86%	3,022	14.77%
1996	8,737	42.47%	10,367	50.39%	1,470	7.14%
2000	11,930	50.98%	11,127	47.55%	343	1.47%
2004	17,505	58.27%	12,379	41.20%	159	0.53%
2008	20,288	60.08%	13,058	38.67%	421	1.25%
2012	20,708	62.74%	11,825	35.83%	473	1.43%
2016	23,799	67.29%	10,038	28.38%	1,532	4.33%
2020	31,464	67.44%	14,418	30.90%	775	1.66%
2024	37,376	71.75%	14,145	27.15%	569	1.09%

== See also ==
- National Register of Historic Places listings in Maury County, Tennessee
