= Mount Pleasant, Tennessee =

- City
- Mount Pleasant Main Street, 2026

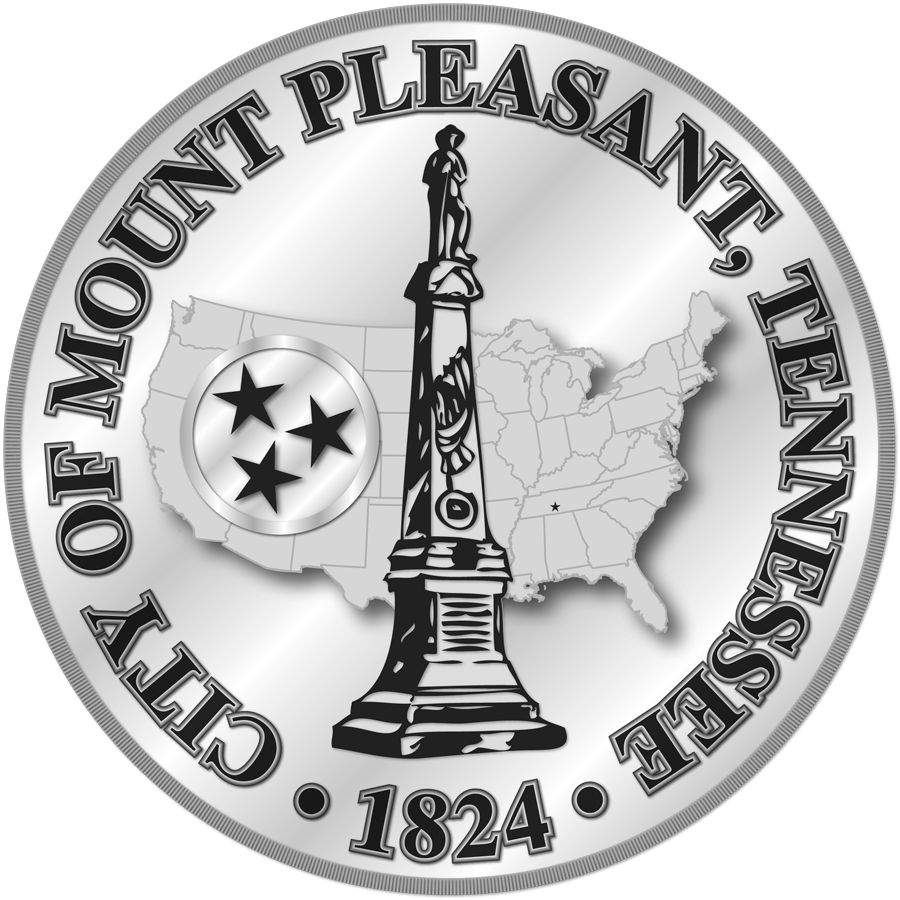
- Seal
- Nickname: The Phosphate Capital of the World
- Location of Mount Pleasant in Maury County, Tennessee.
- Coordinates: 35°32′42″N 87°11′55″W
- Country: United States
- State: Tennessee
- County: Maury
- Established: 1824

Government
  - Type: City Manager-Commission
  - City Manager: Phillip Grooms
  - Mayor: Bill White

Area
  - Total: 12.60 sq mi (32.64 km^{2})
  - Land: 12.58 sq mi (32.57 km^{2})
  - Water: 0.027 sq mi (0.07 km^{2})
- Elevation: 676 ft (206 m)

Population (2020)
  - Total: 4,784
  - Density: 380.4/sq mi (146.87/km^{2})
- Time zone: UTC-6 (Central (CST))
  - Summer (DST): UTC-5 (CDT)
- ZIP code: 38474
- Area code: 931
- FIPS code: 47-51080
- GNIS feature ID: 1306783
- Website: www.mtpleasant-tn.gov

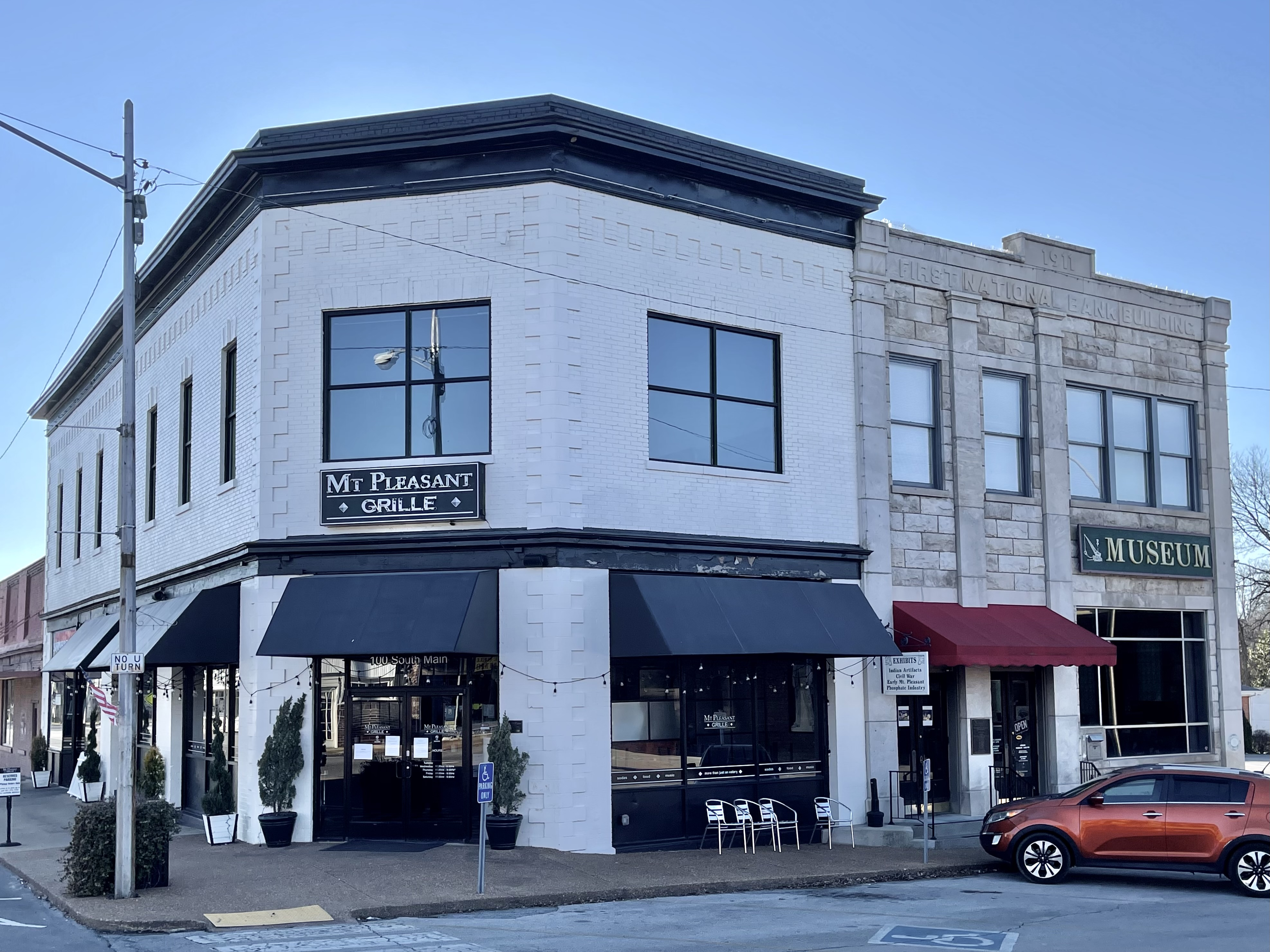
Mount Pleasant Grille & Phosphate Museum February 2022

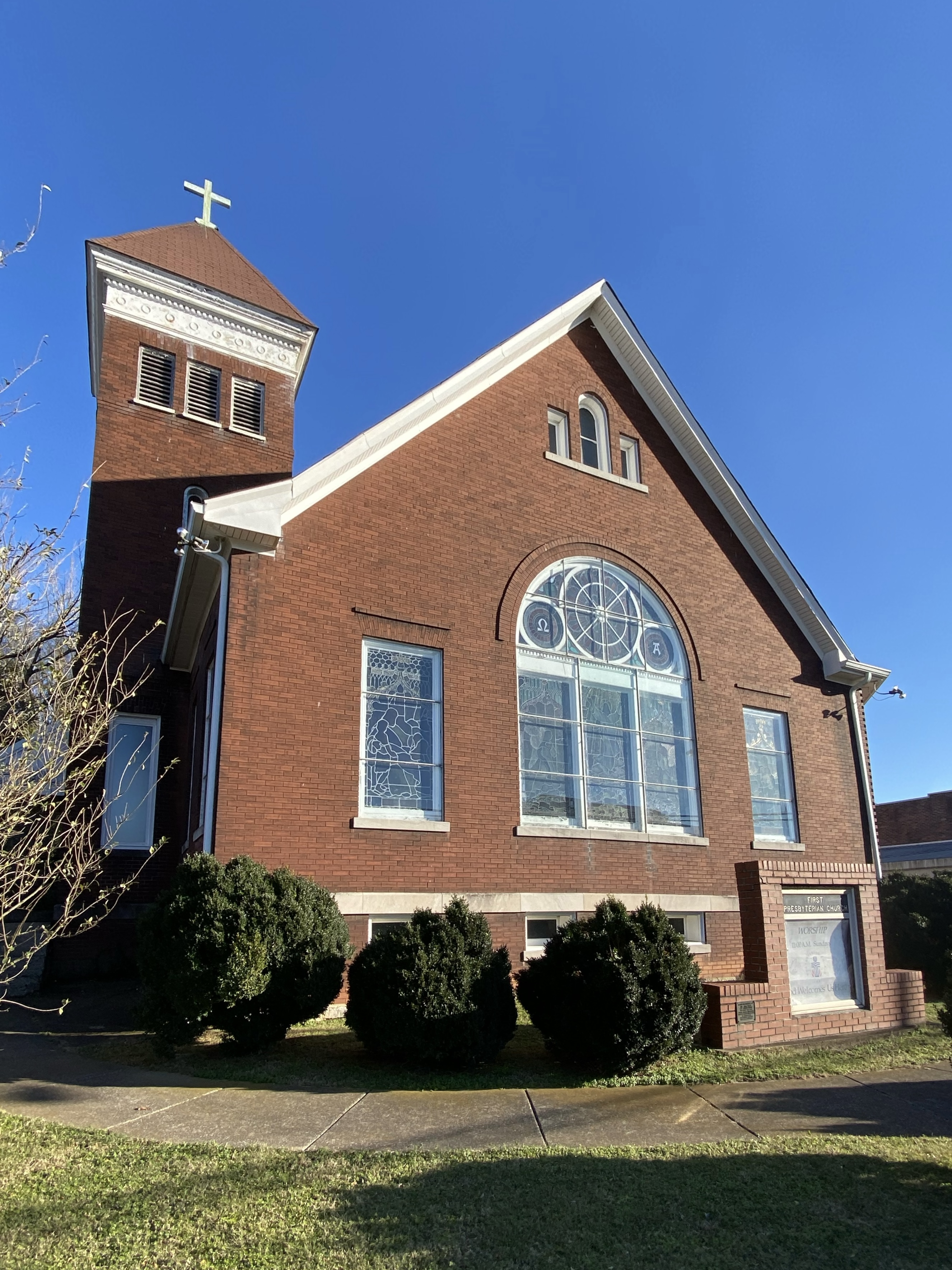
The First Presbyterian Church in Mount Pleasant, TN

Mount Pleasant is a city in Maury County, Tennessee, United States. Mount Pleasant was the birthplace of 19th-century writer and humorist Samuel R. Watkins and formerly titled "The Phosphate Capital of the World." The population was 4,561 at the 2010 census, and 4,784 in 2020.

== History ==
Settlement of Mount Pleasant began in the early 19th century, and increased following the construction of the Military Road connecting Nashville and Madisonville, Louisiana, in 1817. By the time Mount Pleasant incorporated as a city in 1824, it was home to a store, tavern, and several churches.

In 1895, brown phosphate rock was discovered in Mount Pleasant, leading to a mining boom, and giving the city its nickname. Within a few years, ten phosphate mining companies were operating in Mount Pleasant, producing over 25,000 tons per year. The city's population grew from 466 in 1890 to 2,007 in 1900. Phosphate mining remained a major part of the city's economy into the latter half of the 20th century.

== Geography ==
Mount Pleasant is located at 35°32′42″N 87°11′55″W (35.544977, -87.198683). According to the United States Census Bureau, the city has a total area of 11.1 square miles (29 km^{2}), of which 11.1 square miles (29 km^{2}) is land and 0.04 square miles (0.10 km^{2}) (0.18%) is water. Mount Pleasant is situated in a relatively broad plain surrounded by low hills to the east, south, and west. U.S. Route 43 connects the city with Columbia to the northeast and Lawrenceburg to the south.

=== Climate ===
Climate data for Mount Pleasant 1N, Tennessee (1991–2020 normals, extremes 1953–present)
| Month | Jan | Feb | Mar | Apr | May | Jun | Jul | Aug | Sep | Oct | Nov | Dec | Year |
|---|---|---|---|---|---|---|---|---|---|---|---|---|---|
| Record high °F (°C) | 76 (24) | 84 (29) | 87 (31) | 93 (34) | 99 (37) | 107 (42) | 105 (41) | 106 (41) | 105 (41) | 97 (36) | 85 (29) | 76 (24) | 107 (42) |
| Mean daily maximum °F (°C) | 47.3 (8.5) | 52.3 (11.3) | 61.3 (16.3) | 71.6 (22.0) | 79.9 (26.6) | 87.6 (30.9) | 90.5 (32.5) | 89.6 (32.0) | 83.7 (28.7) | 72.5 (22.5) | 61.2 (16.2) | 50.9 (10.5) | 70.7 (21.5) |
| Daily mean °F (°C) | 37.2 (2.9) | 41.8 (5.4) | 49.8 (9.9) | 59.5 (15.3) | 69.1 (20.6) | 77.2 (25.1) | 79.9 (26.6) | 78.0 (25.6) | 71.4 (21.9) | 59.5 (15.3) | 48.7 (9.3) | 40.6 (4.8) | 59.4 (15.2) |
| Mean daily minimum °F (°C) | 27.1 (−2.7) | 31.3 (−0.4) | 38.4 (3.6) | 47.4 (8.6) | 58.4 (14.7) | 66.7 (19.3) | 69.2 (20.7) | 66.4 (19.1) | 59.2 (15.1) | 46.6 (8.1) | 36.3 (2.4) | 30.3 (−0.9) | 48.1 (8.9) |
| Record low °F (°C) | −17 (−27) | −8 (−22) | 5 (−15) | 20 (−7) | 31 (−1) | 38 (3) | 47 (8) | 44 (7) | 33 (1) | 23 (−5) | 9 (−13) | −10 (−23) | −17 (−27) |
| Average precipitation inches (mm) | 5.25 (133) | 5.14 (131) | 6.00 (152) | 5.42 (138) | 6.27 (159) | 5.40 (137) | 4.78 (121) | 3.96 (101) | 5.34 (136) | 3.89 (99) | 4.26 (108) | 6.52 (166) | 62.23 (1,581) |
| Average precipitation days (≥ 0.01 in) | 10.0 | 10.1 | 10.9 | 9.2 | 10.6 | 9.5 | 9.6 | 8.5 | 7.0 | 8.3 | 9.2 | 10.0 | 112.9 |
Source: NOAA

== Demographics ==
Historical population
| Census | Pop. | Note | %± |
|---|---|---|---|
| 1890 | 466 | | — |
| 1900 | 2,007 | | 330.7% |
| 1910 | 1,973 | | −1.7% |
| 1920 | 2,093 | | 6.1% |
| 1930 | 2,010 | | −4.0% |
| 1940 | 3,089 | | 53.7% |
| 1950 | 2,931 | | −5.1% |
| 1960 | 2,921 | | −0.3% |
| 1970 | 3,530 | | 20.8% |
| 1980 | 3,375 | | −4.4% |
| 1990 | 4,278 | | 26.8% |
| 2000 | 4,491 | | 5.0% |
| 2010 | 4,561 | | 1.6% |
| 2020 | 4,784 | | 4.9% |

=== 2022 Special Census ===
In 2022, the City of Mount Pleasant conducted a special census to account for additional population growth that was not accounted for in the federal 2020 census. The result of this census reported a population increase to 5,093 residents inside the city limits.

=== 2020 census ===
As of the 2020 census, Mount Pleasant had a population of 4,784 people and 1,318 families. The median age was 38.9 years, 24.4% of residents were under the age of 18, and 17.5% were 65 years of age or older. For every 100 females there were 83.8 males, and for every 100 females age 18 and over there were 79.2 males.

85.6% of residents lived in urban areas, while 14.4% lived in rural areas.

There were 1,899 households in Mount Pleasant, of which 32.3% had children under the age of 18 living in them. Of all households, 39.6% were married-couple households, 15.9% were households with a male householder and no spouse or partner present, and 37.3% were households with a female householder and no spouse or partner present. About 28.0% of all households were made up of individuals and 11.8% had someone living alone who was 65 years of age or older.

There were 2,124 housing units, of which 10.6% were vacant. The homeowner vacancy rate was 1.4% and the rental vacancy rate was 6.2%.

Racial composition as of the 2020 census
| Race | Number | Percent |
|---|---|---|
| White | 3,474 | 72.6% |
| Black or African American | 897 | 18.8% |
| American Indian and Alaska Native | 17 | 0.4% |
| Asian | 31 | 0.6% |
| Native Hawaiian and Other Pacific Islander | 2 | 0.0% |
| Some other race | 67 | 1.4% |
| Two or more races | 296 | 6.2% |
| Hispanic or Latino (of any race) | 135 | 2.8% |

=== 2000 census ===
As of the census of 2000, there was a population of 4,491, with 1,815 households and 1,232 families residing in the city. The population density was 406.5 inhabitants per square mile (157.0/km^{2}). There were 2,008 housing units at an average density of 181.8 per square mile (70.2/km^{2}). The racial makeup of the city was 75.02% White, 23.45% African American, 0.33% Native American, 0.11% Asian, 0.02% Pacific Islander, 0.24% from other races, and 0.82% from two or more races. Hispanic or Latino of any race were 0.87% of the population.

There were 1,815 households, out of which 33.3% had children under the age of 18 living with them, 44.6% were married couples living together, 19.2% had a female householder with no husband present, and 32.1% were non-families. 28.7% of all households were made up of individuals, and 13.7% had someone living alone who was 65 years of age or older. The average household size was 2.43 and the average family size was 2.97.

In the city, the population was spread out, with 26.4% under the age of 18, 8.0% from 18 to 24, 28.2% from 25 to 44, 22.0% from 45 to 64, and 15.4% who were 65 years of age or older. The median age was 37 years. For every 100 females, there were 82.8 males. For every 100 females age 18 and over, there were 75.2 males.

The median income for a household in the city was $32,004, and the median income for a family was $36,949. Males had a median income of $31,285 versus $22,599 for females. The per capita income for the city was $16,345. About 14.9% of families and 18.5% of the population were below the poverty line, including 27.6% of those under age 18 and 14.1% of those age 65 or over.

== Government ==
The City of Mount Pleasant government consists of five elected commissioners, elected every four years. After each election, at the next scheduled commission meeting, the five commissioners vote on which commissioners will server as mayor and vice mayor. In case of tie or disagreement, the commission will continue nominating and voting until a majority vote is achieved for each position.

Current Mount Pleasant, Tennessee Commissioners

- Bill White (Mayor)
- Willie Alderson (Vice Mayor)
- Mike Davis
- Pam Johnston
- Loree Knowles

The City Manager is selected, by the commission, and is hired on a variable year contract. The city managers is responsible for day to day operations of the city. Additionally, the city manager is the supervisor of all other city departments heads and staff.

City Managers of Mount Pleasant, Tennessee
| City Manager | Notes | Start date | End date |
|---|---|---|---|
| William C. Dunnebacke | | Feb 19, 1963 | October 2, 1964 |
| Elizabeth Searson | (interim) | August 2, 1964 | January 4, 1964 |
| W.C. Loden | | January 4, 1964 | January 7, 1966 |
| Elizabeth Searson | (interim) | May 24, 1966 | Jun 30, 1966 |
| Jay N. Sullivan | | January 7, 1966 | Oct 14, 1968 |
| Elizabeth Searson | (interim) | Oct 15, 1968 | January 3, 1969 |
| O.W. Thomas | | February 3, 1969 | Jul 14, 1975 |
| Mike Brown | | Jul 15, 1975 | November 9, 1976 |
| William Burgess Ralston | (interim) | November 9, 1976 | April 10, 1976 |
| Carl Holder | | April 10, 1976 | Oct 17, 1978 |
| Larry Holden | (interim) | December 11, 1978 | August 1, 1979 |
| James R. Johnson | | August 1, 1979 | January 9, 1981 |
| Larry Holden | (interim) | November 9, 1981 | January 10, 1981 |
| Robert Murray | | Oct 16, 1981 | Jun 30, 2007 |
| Debbie McMullin | (interim) | January 7, 2007 | January 5, 2008 |
| Richard Goode | | January 5, 2008 | Jun 30, 2009 |
| Debbie McMullin | (interim) | Jun 30, 2009 | Jun 18, 2010 |
| Steve Huffer | | Jun 18, 2010 | November 8, 2011 |
| Tommy G. Goetz | (interim) | November 8, 2011 | January 1, 2012 |
| Michelle Williams | | January 1, 2012 | Jul 21, 2015 |
| Mark Henderson | (interim) | Jul 22, 2015 | March 11, 2015 |
| Michael Hay | (interim) | March 11, 2015 | May 2, 2016 |
| Kate Collier | | May 2, 2016 | October 4, 2024 |
| Phillip Grooms | | October 4, 2024 | Present |

Mayors of Mount Pleasant, Tennessee
| Mayor | Start date | End date |
|---|---|---|
| Dr. G. C. English | November 7, 1940 | November 7, 1957 |
| John W. Petty | Jul 23, 1957 | August 7, 1963 |
| Webb Williams | Jul 22, 1963 | Jun 20, 1967 |
| Dr. J. O. Williams, Jr | Jul 18, 1967 | Jun 30, 1970 |
| Jack Lightfoot | Jul 19, 1970 | Jul 15, 1975 |
| James L. (Jim) Bailey, Jr. | Jul 15, 1975 | Jul 19, 1977 |
| Ronald (Ronnie) Lankford | Jul 19, 1977 | Jan 26, 1979 |
| William H. Boyd | Feb 16, 1979 | Jul 19, 1983 |
| G. Ray Wilson | Jul 19, 1983 | Dec 31, 1985 |
| Willie B. Baker | Dec 31, 1985 | Jul 18, 1989 |
| Willie Boyd | Jul 18, 1989 | Mar 30, 2006 |
| Willie B. Baker | Mar 30, 2006 | Jul 17, 2007 |
| Richard A. Hendrix | Jul 17, 2007 | Jul 19, 2011 |
| Maury Colvett | November 8, 2011 | Nov 18, 2014 |
| Robert R. (Bob) Shackelford | Nov 18, 2014 | Nov 22, 2016 |
| James L. (Jim) Bailey, Jr. | Nov 22, 2016 | Dec 18, 2018 |
| Bill White | Dec 18, 2018 | Present |

=== Police Department ===
The Mount Pleasant Police Department was established in 1824.

- 2014 - Present - Michael Hay

=== Fire Department ===
The Mount Pleasant Fire Department is a career fire department consisting of full-time and part time firefighters. The fire department was established in 1899.

- 1988 - 2001 - M. H. "Cotton" Massey
- 2001 - 2017 - Tim Smith
- 2017 - 2025 - Phillip Grooms
- 2025 - Present - Todd Stewart

== Transportation ==
Mount Pleasant is located on U.S. Route 43, as well as State Routes 243 and 166.

Mount Pleasant is also home to the Maury County Regional Airport.

Public transportation was provided by the Mule Town Trolley Service. The Mule Town Trolley connected people all across Maury County. The routes extend from Mount Pleasant to Columbia and on to Spring Hill. The fare was $1.00 each way and riders could request a stop anywhere along the trolley route.

In May 2025, the Mule Town Trolley switched to a reservation based system due to lack of funding.

The trolley service is managed by the South Central Tennessee Development District (SCATS).

== See also ==
- List of cities in Tennessee
