= Campbellsville, Tennessee =

- Unincorporated community
- Location within Tennessee Location within the United States
- Coordinates: 35°20′14″N 87°7′50″W
- Country: United States
- State: Tennessee
- County: Giles
- Elevation: 751 ft (229 m)
- Time zone: UTC-6 (Central (CST))
  - Summer (DST): UTC-5 (CDT)
- GNIS feature ID: 1279471

Campbellsville is an unincorporated community in Giles County, Tennessee, United States. It is located along Tennessee State Route 166 (Campbellsville Road), approximately 11 mi (18 km) northwest of downtown Pulaski, the county seat.

== History ==
The settlement is named for Hamilton Crockett Campbell, an early settler.

A post office was established in 1824. By 1860, Campbellsville had a hotel, an Independent Order of Odd Fellows lodge, two general stores, two grocery stores, two churches, two mills, and a population of 150. In 1924, Campbellsville High School opened, and served the community until 1978.

Campbellsville hosts a heritage festival each October.

== Notable people ==
- Donald Davidson - poet
- Thomas Hackney - U.S. Representative from Missouri
