= Maury County Airport =

- IATA: MRC; ICAO: KMRC; FAA LID: MRC

Summary
- Airport type: Public
- Owner: Maury County Regional Airport Authority
- Serves: Columbia / Mount Pleasant, Tennessee
- Location: Mount Pleasant, Tennessee
- Elevation AMSL: 681 ft / 208 m
- Coordinates: 35°33′16″N 087°10′45″W
- Website: FlyMaury.com

Map
- Location of airport in Tennessee MRC (the United States)

Runways
Direction	Length		Surface
Direction	ft	m	Surface
6/24	6,000	1,829	Asphalt
17/35	1,941	592	Turf

Statistics (2021)
- Aircraft operations: 25,100
- Based aircraft: 30
- Source: Federal Aviation Administration

Maury County Airport (IATA: MRC, ICAO: KMRC, FAA LID: MRC) is a county-owned public-use airport in Maury County, Tennessee, United States. It is located 2 nautical miles (3.7 km; 2.3 mi) northeast of the central business district of Mount Pleasant, Tennessee and 8 nautical miles (15 km; 9.2 mi) southwest of Columbia, Tennessee.

This airport is included in the National Plan of Integrated Airport Systems for 2011–2015, which categorized it as a general aviation airport.

== Facilities and aircraft ==
Maury County Airport covers an area of 188 acres (76 ha) at an elevation of 681 feet (208 m) above mean sea level. It has two runways: 6/24 is 6,000 by 100 feet (1,829 x 30 m) with an asphalt pavement and 17/35 is 1,941 by 95 feet (592 x 29 m) with a turf surface.

For the 12-month period ending May 10, 2021, the airport had 25,100 aircraft operations, an average of 69 per day: 83% general aviation, 9% air taxi, and 9% military. At that time there were 30 aircraft based at this airport: 18 single-engine, 11 multi-engine, and 1 helicopter.

== See also ==
- List of airports in Tennessee
