= Alexander P. Stewart =

Confederate general, mathematician and philosopher (1821-1908)

Lieutenant-General Alexander Peter Stewart
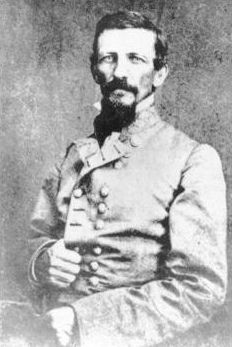
- Photo of Stewart taken during the American Civil War
- Born: October 2, 1821; Rogersville, Tennessee, US
- Died: August 30, 1908 (aged 86); Biloxi, Mississippi, US
- Burial place: Bellefontaine Cemetery; St. Louis, Missouri
- Military career
- Allegiance: United States; Confederate States of America
- Branch: US Army; Confederate States Army
- Service years: 1842–1845 (USA); 1861–1865 (CSA)
- Rank: Second Lieutenant (USA); Lieutenant General (CSA)
- Unit: 3rd U.S. Artillery Regiment
- Commands: 2nd Brigade, 1st Division, Polk's Corps; Stewart's Division, Buckner's Corps; Third Corps, Army of Tennessee; Army of Tennessee
- Conflicts: American Civil War: Battle of Belmont; Battle of Shiloh; Siege of Corinth; Battle of Perryville; Battle of Stones River; Battle of Hoover's Gap; Battle of Chickamauga; Battle of Missionary Ridge; Battle of Ezra Church; Second Battle of Tilton; Second Battle of Franklin; Battle of Nashville
- Other work: Professor (Cumberland University, University of Nashville); chancellor (University of Mississippi); park commissioner

Alexander Peter Stewart (October 2, 1821 – August 30, 1908) was a Confederate military officer during the American Civil War and a college professor. He fought in many of the most significant battles in the Western Theater of the war and briefly took command of the Army of Tennessee in 1865.

== Early life and career ==
Stewart was born in Rogersville, Tennessee. He graduated from the United States Military Academy in 1842 (12th of 56 cadets) and was commissioned a second lieutenant in the 3rd U.S. Artillery Regiment. He resigned his commission on May 31, 1845 to become a professor of mathematics and experimental philosophy at Cumberland University in Lebanon, Tennessee, and later attained the same position at the University of Nashville.

== Civil War service ==
At the start of the American Civil War in 1861, although he was a strong anti-secessionist Whig politically, Stewart accepted a commission as major in the artillery of the Tennessee Militia on May 17. Shortly afterward, he entered the Confederate States Army on August 15 as a major of artillery.

Stewart was appointed a brigadier general on November 8 and assigned to command the 2nd Brigade, 2nd Division, Columbus District, of the Confederate Department No. Two (the precursor to the Department of Tennessee), under Leonidas Polk. Stewart held this position from November 16 until December, when his brigade was transferred to the Department's First Geographical Division, until February 1862. His brigade was returned to western Kentucky, briefly being added to John P. McCown's division, leading the defenses of the town at the Battle of New Madrid before McCown ordered it evacuated and withdrew down the Mississippi River. On April 1, Stewart's men joined Charles Clark's division, in Leonidas Polk's corps, of Albert Sidney Johnston's Army of Mississippi, just in time for the Battle of Shiloh. There, Stewart led his brigade in first-day attacks on the "Hornet's Nest" area in the center of the U.S. line.

Following Johnston's death, command of the Army of Mississippi fell to P.G.T. Beauregard for the Siege of Corinth, where Stewart was present. President Davis soon replaced Beauregard in favor of Braxton Bragg, who transported the army to Chattanooga, Tennessee, in preparation for his invasion of Kentucky. In the Confederate Heartland Offensive, Stewart's brigade fought at the Battle of Perryville in Benjamin Cheatham's division of the army's right wing, commanded by Polk. The Army of Mississippi became the Army of Tennessee near the end of 1862, and Stewart and his brigade served continued to serve in Cheatham's Division in Polk's First Corps at the Battle of Stones River. Stewart was promoted to divisional command and to major general on June 2, 1863, assigned to William J. Hardee's corps for the Tullahoma Campaign. His division unsuccessfully opposed General George Henry Thomas's corps at the Battle of Hoover's Gap before his division was assigned to Simon Bolivar Buckner's corps and fought at the Battle of Chickamauga, Stewart being wounded in the fight on September 19. Before the second day, Buckner's corps was assigned to the army's left wing to be commanded by the recently arriving James Longstreet. Following Chickamauga, Bragg demoted Buckner and left for Virginia on medical leave; Longstreet left soon after to besiege U.S.-controlled Knoxville. Stewart's division remained at Chattanooga and was assigned to John C. Breckinridge's corps, for whom he and his men fought on the extreme left of the Confederate line at the Battle of Missionary Ridge in November 1863.

Stewart fought at the battles of Rocky Face Ridge, Resaca, and New Hope Church, commanding a division in John Bell Hood's corps of Joseph E. Johnston's Army of Tennessee early in the Atlanta campaign in 1864. Stewart was then assigned command of the Third Corps, replacing William Loring who had assumed temporary command in June for the Battle of Kennesaw Mountain after Polk was killed by artillery on Pine Mountain just two weeks prior. He was appointed temporary Lieutenant General on June 23, 1864. Stewart next took part in the Battle of Peachtree Creek, taking possession of the home of Georgia's Quartermaster General, Ira Roe Foster, as his headquarters. Georgia Historical Commission marker 060–90, erected at that location, states: "Site of the Ira R. Foster house which was occupied as headquarters by Gen. A. P. Stewart, [CSA] during military operations N. of Atlanta, July 16–21, 1864. From here were issued the orders directing his troops in the Battle of Peachtree Creek, July 20." Stewart led the Third Corps at the Battle of Ezra Church, where he was wounded in the forehead on July 28.

Stewart continued to lead the Third Corps during the Franklin-Nashville Campaign in the fall of 1864, participating in the Battle of Franklin that November and the Battle of Nashville in December. Stewart's corps fared badly on the first day of the Battle of Nashville, and it broke on the second day when the troops to its left were forced from their position. What was left of the Army of Tennessee was sent east and fought in the Carolinas campaign in 1865, once again under the command of Gen. Joseph E. Johnston, who placed the Army of Tennessee (by this time fewer than 5,000 men) under Stewart's command.

Stewart surrendered the army on April 26 and was paroled at Greensboro, North Carolina on May 1.

== Postbellum career ==
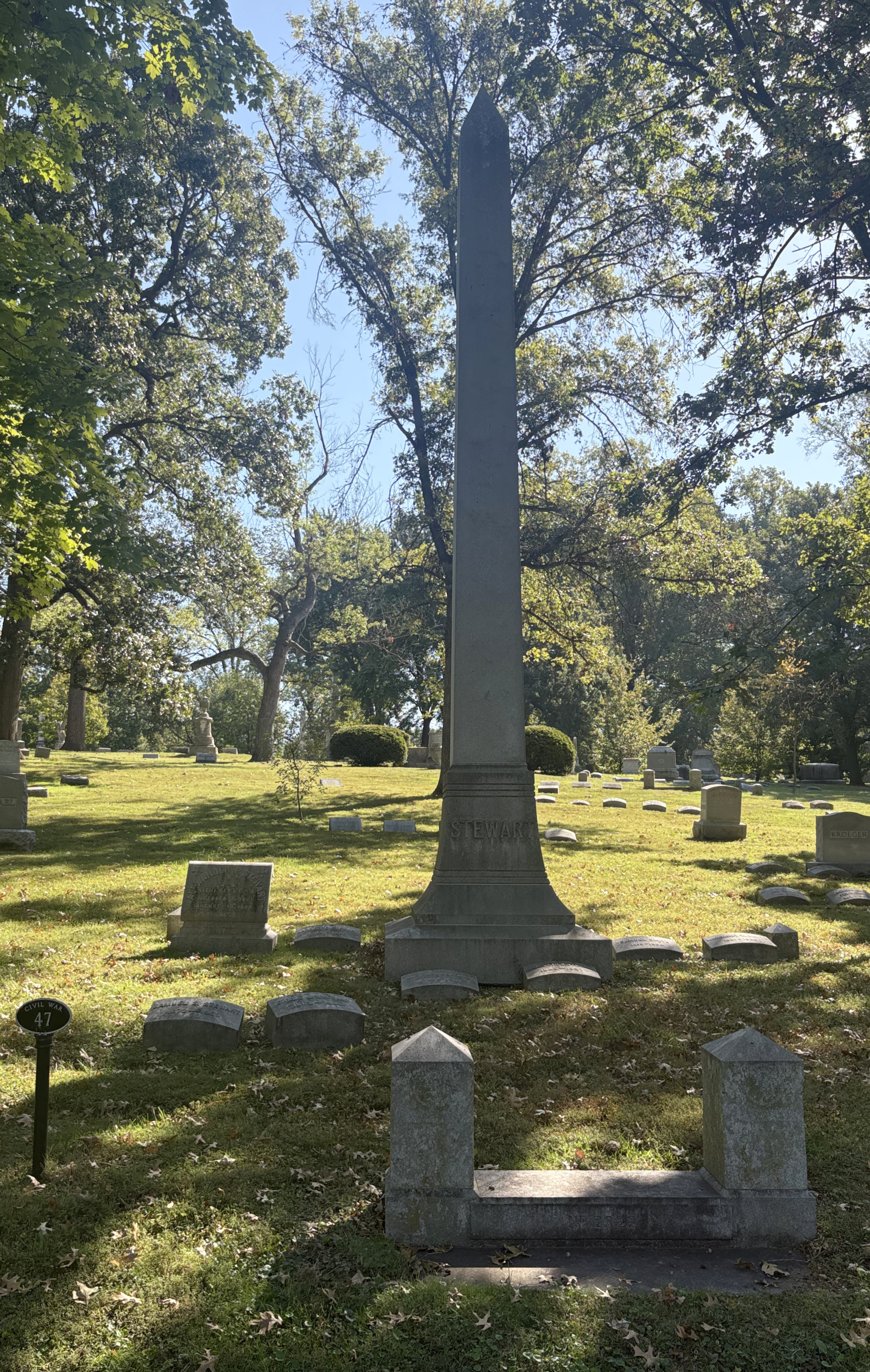
Stewart's grave at Bellefontaine Cemetery

After the war, Stewart moved to Missouri in 1869 and became an insurance executive. He then moved to Mississippi in 1874, where he served as the Chancellor of the University of Mississippi until 1886. From 1890 to 1908, he was the commissioner of the Chickamauga and Chattanooga National Military Park. He was injured when he was hit by a train on March 30, 1893, and returned to Missouri in 1906.

By 1905, Stewart was described as "of advanced years, but clear of intellect" and "deeply interested...for several years" in the teachings of the Watch Tower; that magazine reported Stewart's baptism following a talk by Charles Taze Russell. Russell delivered the funeral sermon in St. Louis following Stewart's death in Biloxi, Mississippi in 1908. Stewart is buried in Bellefontaine Cemetery, St. Louis, Missouri.

A statue of Stewart erected in 1919 is located outside the Hamilton County Courthouse in Chattanooga, Tennessee.

== See also ==
- List of American Civil War generals (Confederate)
- Rogersville, Tennessee
- Cumberland University
- University of Nashville
- University of Mississippi
