= First Corps, Army of Tennessee =

- The Polk pattern battle flag
- Active: 1862 – 1865
- Disbanded: April 26, 1865
- Country: Confederate States
- Branch: Confederate States Army
- Role: Headquarters
- Size: Corps
- Part of: Army of Tennessee
- Nicknames: Polk's Corps; Cheatham's Corps; Hardee's Corps
- Engagements: American Civil War

Commanders
- Commanding officers: Lieut. Gen. Leonidas Polk; Maj. Gen. Benjamin F. Cheatham; Maj. Gen. Patrick Cleburne (acting); Lieut. Gen. William J. Hardee

The First Corps, Army of Tennessee, commonly known as Polk's Corps, Cheatham's Corps, or Hardee's Corps, was a corps of the Army of Tennessee.

== Formation ==
Units of the First Corps, Army of Tennessee, were drawn from the organization of Department No. 2 (or the Western Department) of the Confederate army, which held responsibility for defending the area between the Tennessee and Mississippi. It also incorporated troops transferred from the Army of Mississippi.

== History ==
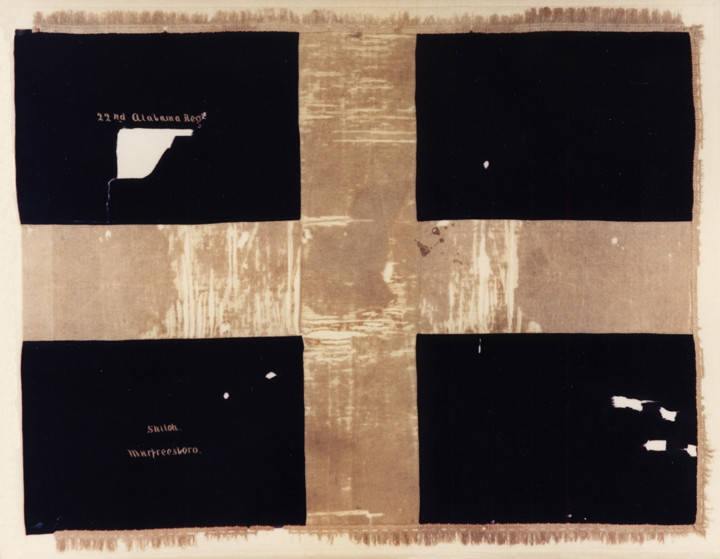
Variant of the Polk pattern flag

Lieutenant-general Leonidas Polk commanded the corps from November 26, 1862, and held it with minor interruptions until his relief on September 29, 1863, and subsequent arrest on October 23, 1863. It participated in the Tennessee Campaign (June to October 1863) under General Braxton Bragg. Major engagements under General Polk included Stones River (from December 1862 until January 1863) and Chickamauga (in September 1863).

Major-general Benjamin F. Cheatham commanded the corps four times; during the periods September 29 to October 23, 1863, from December 2 to 27, 1863, then August 31 to September 2, 1864, and lastly from September 28, 1864 to February 23, 1865. This last posting was the only period which he was not in "temporary" command. Major-general Patrick Cleburne was also in temporary command the corps from August 31 to September 1, 1864.

Lieutenant-general William J. Hardee commanded the corps four times; during the periods October 23 to December 2, 1863, again from December 27 to August 31, 1864, a third time from September 2 to 28, 1864, and lastly from February 23 to April 26, 1865. On that date the corps, along with the rest of the Army of Tennessee, were surrendered by Gen. Joseph E. Johnston.

== Structure ==
- On October 31, 1863, part of Third Corps was added.
- On November 4, 1863, the "Reserve Corps" of the army was added.
- On April 10, 1865, all remaining forces in the state of Georgia were added.

== Commanding officers ==
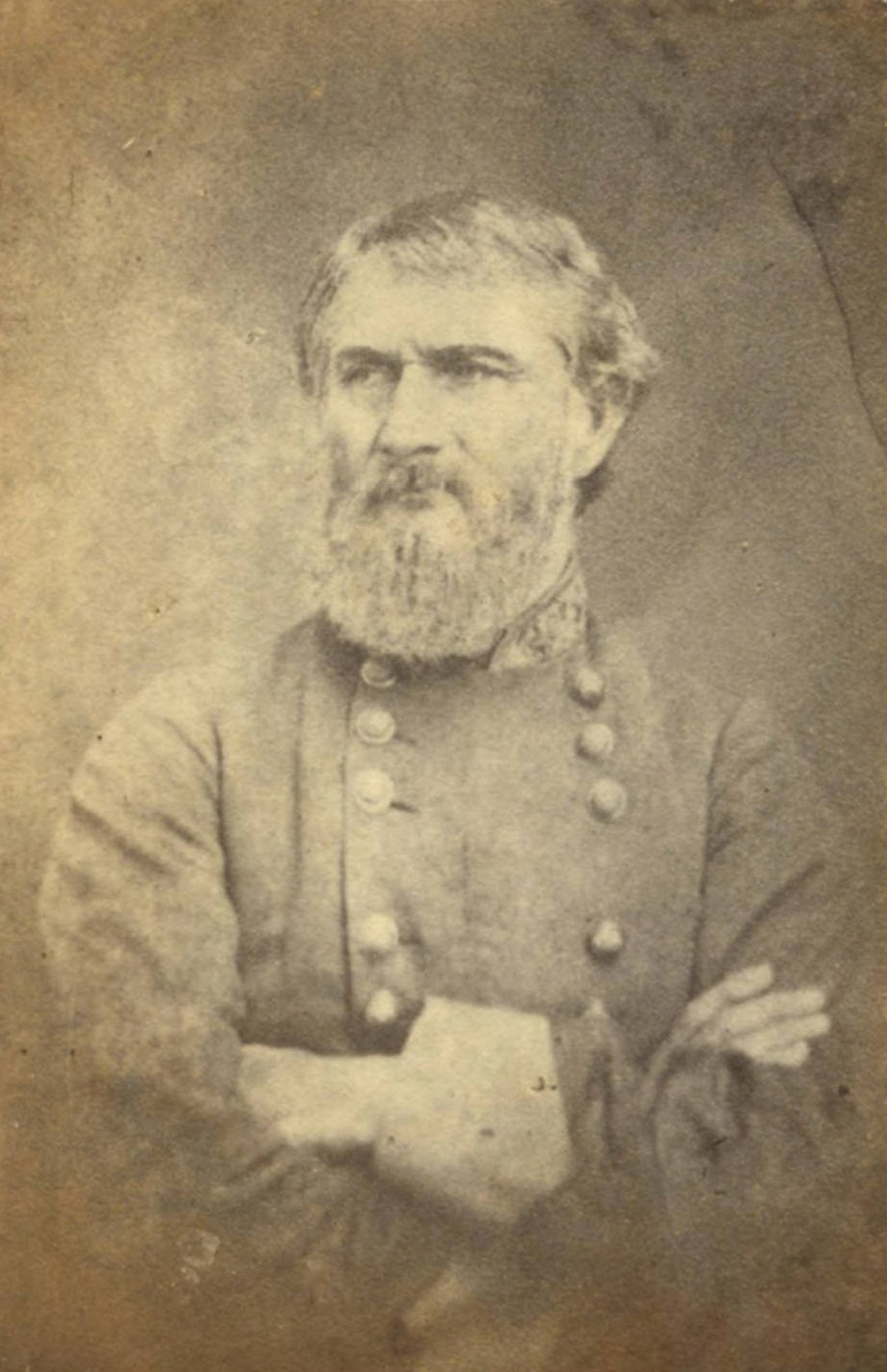
Lieut. Gen. Leonidas Polk

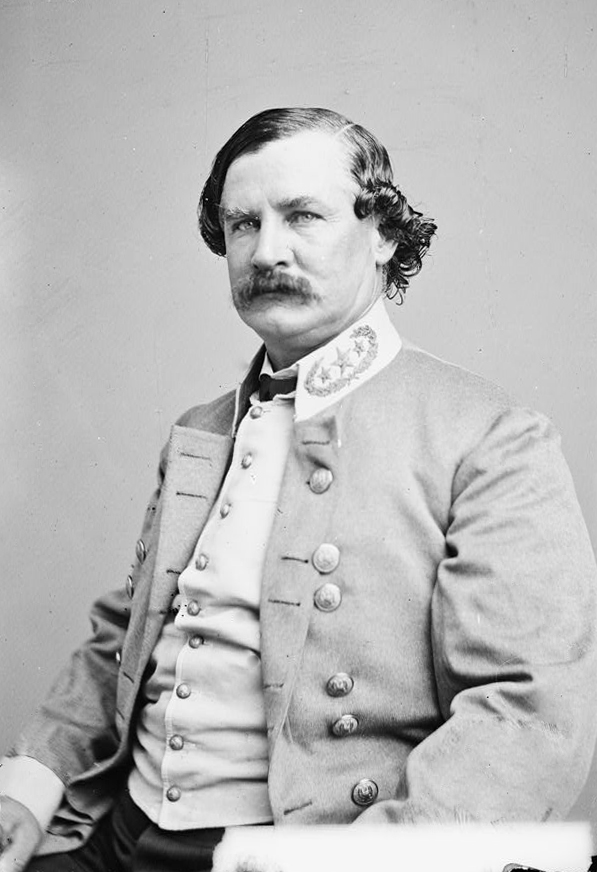
Maj. Gen. Benjamin F. Cheatham

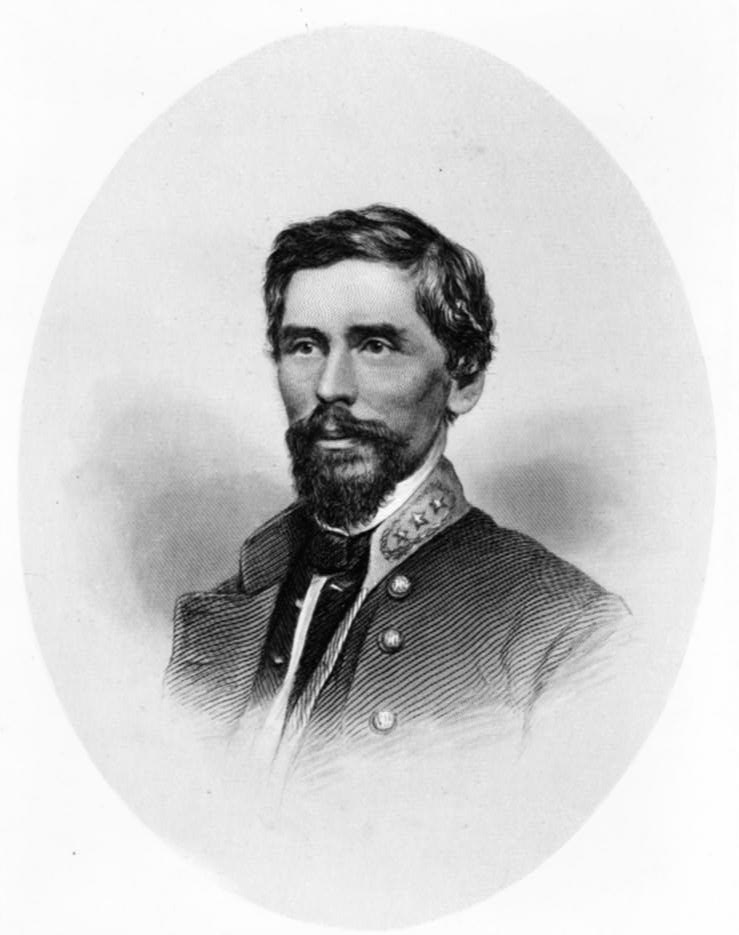
Maj. Gen. Patrick Cleburne
(acting)

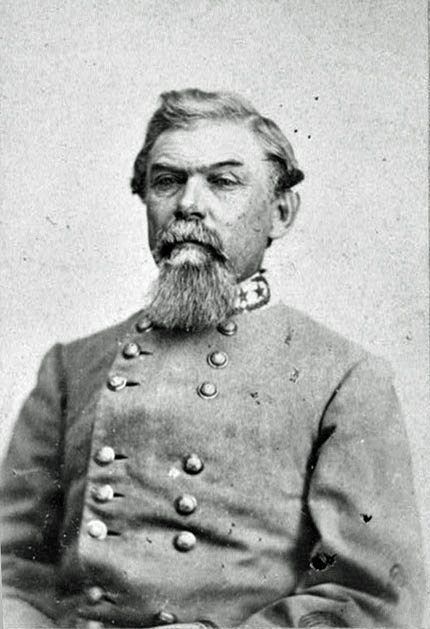
Lieut. Gen. William J. Hardee
