= William Mecklenburg Polk =

American physician

- Born: August 15, 1844; Ashwood, Maury Co.
- Died: 1918 (aged 73–74)
- Spouse: Ida Ashe Lyon
- Children: Frank Polk

William Mecklenburg Polk (15 August 1844 – 1918) was an American physician. From 1911 to 1912 he was vice president, then from 1912 to 1913 president of the Aztec Club of 1847.

== Biography ==
He was the son of Leonidas Polk, and was born at Ashwood, Maury Co., Tenn. He served in the Confederate army under his father during the Civil War, advancing from the rank of cadet to captain. After graduating from the College of Physicians and Surgeons, New York, he settled in the same city, serving as professor of therapeutics and clinical medicine at Bellevue Hospital Medical College (1875–1879), of obstetrics and gynaecology at the University of the City of New York (1879–1898), and subsequently as dean and professor of gynæcology at Cornell University Medical College. He also became connected with many hospitals and dispensaries, and was president of the New York Academy of Medicine in 1910–1914. After volunteering for service in 1917, William Polk was a First Lieutenant in the U.S. Army Reserve Medical Corps upon his death on June 23, 1918. His son, Frank Polk, served as counselor to the Department of State through World War One and later became the first US Under Secretary of State.

His wife's sister was married to Zachariah C. Deas.

== Writings ==
He was the author of Leonidas Polk, Bishop and General (1893; new edition, two volumes, 1915) and of numerous contributions to medical journals, later reprinted.
