= Army of Tennessee =

Field army of the Confederate States

- Flag of the Army of Tennessee (1864–1865)
- Active: 1862–1865
- Disbanded: May 1, 1865
- Country: Confederate States
- Branch: Army
- Size: Field army
- Wars: American Civil War; Western Theater

Commanders
- Commanding officers: Gen. Braxton Bragg (1862–63); Gen. Joseph E. Johnston (1863–64); Gen. John B. Hood (1864–65)

The Army of Tennessee was a field army of the Confederate States Army in the western theater of the American Civil War. Named for the Confederate state of Tennessee, it was formed late in 1862 in Tennessee and fought until the end of the civil war, participating in most of the significant battles in the western theater.

== History ==
=== 1862 ===
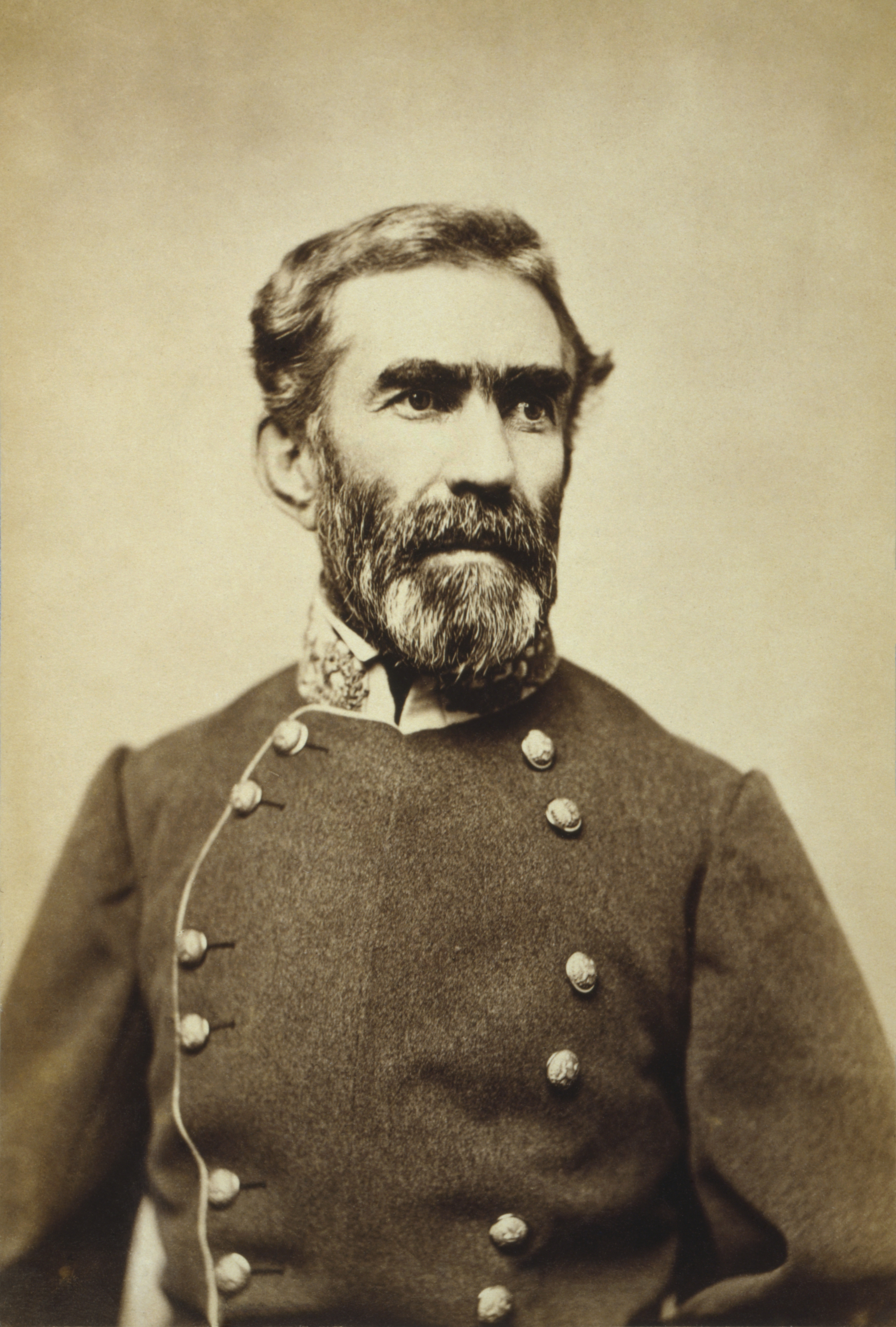
Braxton Bragg

The army was formed on November 20, 1862, when General Braxton Bragg renamed the former Army of Mississippi and was divided into two corps (1st Corps and 2nd Corps) commanded by Leonidas Polk and William J. Hardee. A third corps was formed from troops from the Department of East Tennessee and commanded by Edmund Kirby Smith; it was disbanded in early December after one of its two divisions was sent to Mississippi. The remaining division was assigned to Hardee's corps while Kirby Smith returned to East Tennessee. The army's cavalry was consolidated into a single command under Joseph Wheeler.

The army's first major engagement under its new name took place against the Army of the Cumberland on December 31 along the Stones River. The attacks started at 6 a.m. against the Union right wing and forced the Union flank back towards the Union supply route to Nashville, but the Confederates were unable to capture the road. Bragg expected Union commander William S. Rosecrans to retreat during the night but Rosecrans decided to remain. No fighting took place on January 1; the next day Bragg assigned one division to seize a ridge on the east side of Stones River but the division's attack was repulsed by heavy artillery fire. Bragg retreated during the night and halted near the Duck River.

=== 1863 ===
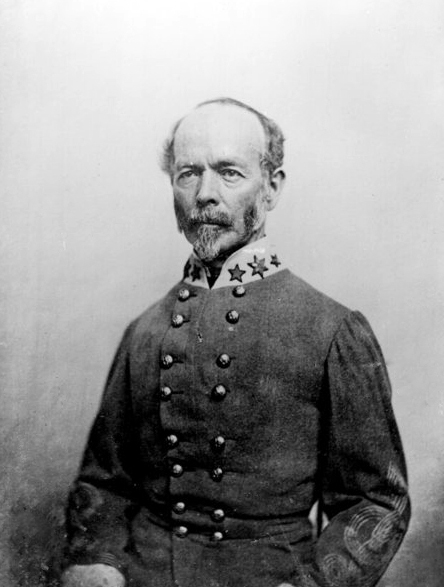
Joseph E. Johnston

Following Stones' River, feuding broke out between Bragg and his corps and division commanders over who was responsible for the Confederate defeat; several officers stated that Bragg had lost the confidence of the army. When he learned of the dispute, Confederate President Jefferson Davis sent Joseph Johnston to inspect the army and take command if he thought it necessary to relieve Bragg. Johnston however refused to take command of the army.

In the summer of 1863, Rosecrans began an offensive, generally known as the Tullahoma Campaign, a name taken from the location of the Confederate headquarters at the time. Due to the low level of the river, Bragg felt compelled to retreat back to his supply center of Chattanooga, Tennessee, where he established his headquarters. When the Union forces halted following the campaign, Bragg took the opportunity to make several command changes in the army. Hardee was transferred to Mississippi in July and replaced by D.H. Hill. Bragg's department was reorganized into the Department of Tennessee, which covered Alabama north of the Tennessee River and Georgia north of Atlanta; the Department of East Tennessee, now commanded by Simon Buckner, was merged with Bragg's department and Buckner's troops were designated the Third Corps. The cavalry was reorganized into two corps commanded by Wheeler and Forrest; a two-division Reserve Corps was also organized under the command of W.H.T. Walker. The Confederate government agreed to transfer James Longstreet's First Corps, Army of Northern Virginia to the army during this time, but due to the loss of Knoxville, Longstreet had to travel by rail through the Carolinas and Atlanta to northern Georgia; the movement started on September 9.

Rosecrans launched the Chickamauga Campaign in late August, staging demonstrations near Chattanooga and upstream of the city along the Tennessee River. This convinced Bragg that Rosecrans was crossing the river to the north; however, Union forces were actually crossing to the south of the city. This forced Bragg to fall back into northern Georgia, abandoning the important railroad hub of Chattanooga on September 8.

Over the course of the next several days, Bragg attempted to launch several attacks on isolated parts of the Union army but each attempt failed. On the evening of September 18, Bragg concentrated the army near Chickamauga Creek; he thought that only part of the Union army was nearby but Rosecrans had concentrated his army faster than Bragg had expected.

During September 19 at Chickamauga, both sides fed in reinforcements as the day progressed. Longstreet arrived on the battlefield during the night of the 19 and 20; Bragg divided the army into two wings, with Polk commanding one division of his corps along with Hill's and Walker's corps on the right, and Longstreet commanding the other division of Polk's corps with Buckner's corps and his own corps (commanded by John B. Hood), on the left. Polk was ordered to attack at daylight on September 20, with Longstreet attacking immediately afterwards, but Polk didn't launch his attack until midmorning. The left wing failed to dislodge the Union army but Longstreet's wing attacked a gap in the Union army which routed the Union right flank. A portion of the Union army rallied on Horseshoe Ridge and held off multiple Confederate attacks until evening, when it followed the rest of Rosecrans' army into Chattanooga.

After Chickamauga, the Army of Tennessee besieged the Union army in Chattanooga, taking up defensive positions on the surrounding hills, especially on Missionary Ridge, which formed the Confederate center, and Lookout Mountain on the Confederate left. Bragg considered a direct attack on the city too costly, and a lack of supplies and pontoons caused him to reject a plan to cross the river and break the Union supply line to Nashville. Instead he spread the Confederate army along the Tennessee River, cutting the Union railroad supply line into the city and reducing the amount of supplies the Union army could get into the city.

During the next several weeks, Bragg became embroiled with a dispute with the army's corps commanders. Bragg became involved in a personal dispute with Forrest, which led to Forrest being reassigned to Mississippi and West Tennessee, with his cavalry corps merged with Wheeler's corps. Meanwhile, Hill, Buckner, and Longstreet, along with several division commanders, signed a petition to Davis, asking that Bragg be relieved of command. After Davis rejected the petition, Bragg made several changes to the command structure of the army. Polk was relieved of command and was charged with disobedience during the Chickamauga campaign and failure to attack when ordered; instead of being court martialed, Polk was transferred to Mississippi and Hardee took command of the First Corps. Hill was also relieved of command and replaced by John C. Breckinridge; both the Third Corps and Reserve Corps were merged into the other two corps, with Buckner and Walker demoted to division command.

During the month of September and into early October, the Army of the Cumberland was reinforced by the troops of Army of the Tennessee, commanded by Maj. Gen. William Tecumseh Sherman, along with two corps from the Army of the Potomac under Maj. Gen. Joseph Hooker. Ulysses S. Grant, now in overall command of Union forces in the west under the newly created Military Division of the Mississippi, replaced Rosecrans in command with George H. Thomas; Grant had command of the combined Union forces.

During the early morning hours of October 27, Union forces captured Brown's Ferry, which opened a supply route to Alabama; A Confederate counterattack at Wauhatchie during the night of October 28–29 tried to recapture the ferry but failed. Bragg then on November 5 sent Longstreet's corps to Knoxville and nearly all of his cavalry away, reducing his army's strength; Bragg hoped that Grant would be forced to detach part of his own force to relieve the Union garrison at the city.

The final Union attack on the Confederate army started November 24, when Hooker captured Lookout Mountain and threatened the Confederate left flank. The next day, Sherman attacked the Confederate right flank on Missionary Ridge but was stalemated. To help Sherman and to draw Confederate units from the right, Grant ordered a demonstration against the Confederate center. This demonstration by Thomas turned into a full-fledged attack which broke through the Confederate line. Bragg retreated back into north Georgia, regrouping around Dalton. His request to be relieved was accepted on December 1. Hardee temporarily took command of the army, but refused an offer of permanent command. Instead Davis appointed Joseph Johnston to command the army in December 1863.

=== 1864 ===
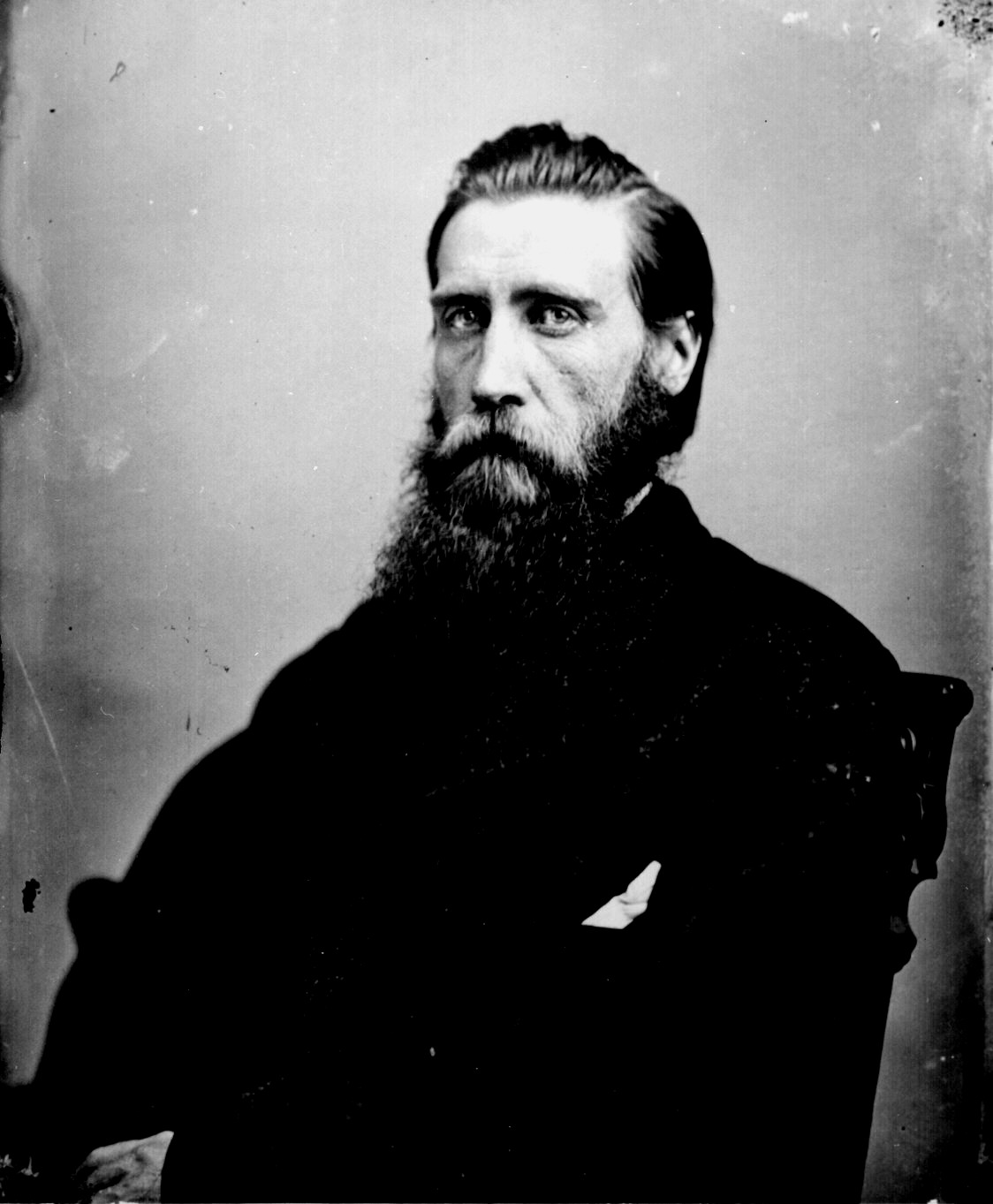
John B. Hood

During the winter of 1864, the army went through other command changes: John B. Hood took command of the Second Corps, while Polk was transferred to the army in May with the Army of Mississippi, which was re-designated the Third Corps. In the 1864 Atlanta campaign, Johnston faced the combined Northern armies of Maj. Gen. William T. Sherman, whose orders were to destroy the Army of Tennessee, with the capture of Atlanta as the secondary objective. Johnston, who felt the continued existence of his army was more important than protecting territory, tended to avoid battle with Sherman.

During May and early June, Johnston took up several defensive positions but withdrew from each after Sherman outflanked each position. Polk was killed at Pine Mountain on June 14; he was temporarily replaced by W. W. Loring until July, when A. P. Stewart took command of the corps. Johnston's retreats caused impatience among the Confederate leadership in Richmond, particularly Confederate President Jefferson Davis, who had never gotten on well with Johnston, and feared that Johnston was planning to abandon Atlanta without a fight. Following Sherman's outflanking of Johnston's Line along the Chattahoochee River, forcing Johnston back on Atlanta itself, Johnston was replaced by Hood on July 9. Stephen D. Lee was reassigned from Mississippi to take command of the Second Corps. Hood launched several attacks on Sherman's forces around Atlanta, including at Peachtree Creek, Atlanta, and Ezra Church, but each attack failed. Sherman was able to cut Hood's last railroad supply line following the Battle of Jonesboro on September 1, which forced Hood to abandon the city the following day.

Hood then retreated southwest of Atlanta, first to Lovejoy's Station before stopping at Palmetto; there he met with Davis and P.G.T. Beauregard, who had just been appointed commander of the Military Division of the West. Hardee was transferred to take command of the Department of South Carolina, Georgia, and Florida, while Frank Cheatham took command of Hardee's Corps. Davis approved Hood's plan to attack Sherman's supply lines north of Atlanta; if Sherman followed him, Hood could then compel Sherman to attack him on ground of his own choosing.

Hood started north at the end of September, capturing several Union railroad garrisons and destroying several miles of tracks. When Sherman followed the Confederates, Hood started moving west into Alabama instead of fighting in northern Georgia. By the end of October, Sherman decided to give up his pursuit of Hood and instead launched his March to the Sea. Instead of following Sherman's forces, Hood decided to head back north into Tennessee. Wheeler's cavalry corps was detached to Georgia and the Carolinas to fight Sherman's advance; Forrest's corps was then attached to Hood's army. The army reached Tuscumbia on the Tennessee River but a lack of supplies and the need to repair the railroad to the city in order to accumulate supplies prevented the army from crossing the river until November 20.

Hood was faced in Middle Tennessee by Thomas and the Army of the Cumberland. Hood tried to trap part of the Union army under John M. Schofield near Columbia but failed; he then tried to march past Schofield and reach Nashville first before any Union reinforcements reached the city. However, Schofield, detecting Hood's march, ordered a retreat back to Nashville and managed to avoid being cut off at Spring Hill; despite Hood's orders that Confederate forces seize the Nashville Turnpike. Hood caught up with Schofield at Franklin and ordered an immediate frontal assault, despite only having two of his three infantry corps present; he also ignored the advice of his subordinates to outflank the Union fortifications and avoid a head-on attack. During the resulting battle, Hood lost 7,000 men, almost a quarter of his strength, including six generals killed or mortally wounded, another six wounded, and one captured. but continued to advance north into Middle Tennessee, where he attempted to besiege Nashville. He deployed the Confederate army along a range of hills and ridges south of the city in a line for a total of four miles and started digging entrenchments and redoubts.

Cheatham's corps was on the right, Lee's corps in the center, and Stewart's corps on the left. Since there was a total of 21,000 men present in the army, Hood was unable to completely surround the city; the Confederate left was four miles from the Cumberland River, while the right was one mile from the river. On December 15, Thomas's troops launched their attack, feinting towards the Confederate right while the main assault fell on the Confederate left. Lee's corps was driven from its defensive works, forcing Hood to retreat to another line of hills to the south. Cheatham's corps was on the left, Stewart's corps in the center, and Lee's corps on the right. Thomas attacked again the next afternoon, using another feint against the Confederate right while launching another flanking attack against the Confederate left. Cheatham's and Stewart's corps were routed, while Lee's corps served as the rear guard as the Confederates retreated from the field. Hood decided to abandon the state due to the poor state of the army. Forrest's cavalry, along with eight brigades of infantry, formed the rear guard. The army initially retreated to Corinth but since the railroad was too damaged to supply the army, Hood ordered a further retreat to Tupelo. According to Robert Bevier of the 5th Missouri Infantry, "the Army of Tennessee ceased to exist" after completing the retreat from Nashville. While the army did not actually "cease to exist," Bevier's comment provides insight into the army's morale at that time.

=== 1865 ===
Hood resigned his command in January, and was briefly replaced by Richard Taylor. During late January and February, the army was transferred to the Carolinas, where it joined other Confederate forces fighting against Sherman's troops marching through the Carolinas. Stewart commanded the army during this time, with William W. Loring in command of Stewart's Corps, D. H. Hill commanding Lee's corps, and William B. Bate commanding Cheatham's corps (both Lee and Cheatham were still traveling from Mississippi). Wheeler's cavalry corps operated as part of Wade Hampton's cavalry command. General Joseph E. Johnston was given command of the Confederate forces in the region, which he dubbed the Army of the South.

At this time, the Army of Tennessee was reduced to only 4,500 men and lacked many supplies, including weapons, artillery, and wagons, and suffered from desertion along the way east from Mississippi. In very few weeks Johnston was able to rebuild this army into a force that could provide serious resistance to Sherman's advancing army.

Parts of the Army of Tennessee fought in several small engagements during the Carolinas campaign, including Wise's Forks. The entire army fought at the Battle of Bentonville from March 19 to 21, when Johnston attacked one wing of Sherman's army, hoping to crush it before Sherman's other wing could arrive. In accordance with Johnston's plan, Stewart positioned his forces on the Confederate right wing facing south, with Loring on the left, Hill in the center, and Bate on the right.

Johnston launched his attack shortly after 3 p.m. Stewart drove back the left wing of the Union XIV Corps, capturing three cannons and several hundred prisoners, but the army became disorganized as a result and the attack had to be temporarily halted for the army to reform. Part of the army was sent to assist the Confederate left wing and the rest attacked the Union XX Corps with troops from William J. Hardee's command; the Union troops were able to repulse each attack. During the night, Sherman brought his other wing to the battlefield, forcing Johnston to retreat back to the Confederate starting positions and refusing his flank in order to protect his line of retreat; Stewart's men occupied the Confederate center.

Johnston retreated during the night of March 21 and moved through Morrisville before arriving near Smithfield, North Carolina. During the three-week encampment around Smithfield, Johnston reorganized his force into a single army, adopting the name of the Army of Tennessee for the combined forces. Most of the regiments were consolidated into single units, while the infantry was divided into three corps commanded by Hardee, Stewart, and Lee; Hampton was given command of the cavalry corps, while Wheeler remained in command of the divisions formerly in his corps. The artillery was reorganized from sixteen batteries into seven batteries of four cannons each. Johnston's total strength was about 30,400 men.

When Sherman started after Johnston on April 10, Johnston retreated through Raleigh, North Carolina, abandoning the city on April 12 before continuing westward along the North Carolina Railroad to Hillsborough; he planned to surrender but thought that the Confederacy could get better terms if he negotiated from a position of strength. Johnston and Sherman met and negotiated terms of surrender on April 17 and 18 at the Bennett Place near Durham Station, North Carolina.

Sherman not only accepted the surrender of the Army of Tennessee but promised to recognize the Confederate state governments. These terms were immediately rejected by the Union government, forcing Sherman and Johnston to negotiate a new agreement. The new terms of surrender, signed on April 26, were modeled on the terms agreed to by Robert E. Lee at Appomattox Court House, and included not only the Army of Tennessee but also all other Confederate forces in Florida, Georgia, South Carolina, and North Carolina. The number of Confederate troops included in the surrender totaled almost 90,000 men.

== Corps organization ==
- First Corps
- Second Corps
- Third Corps
- Forrest's Cavalry Corps – Nathan Bedford Forrest

== Major battles and campaigns ==
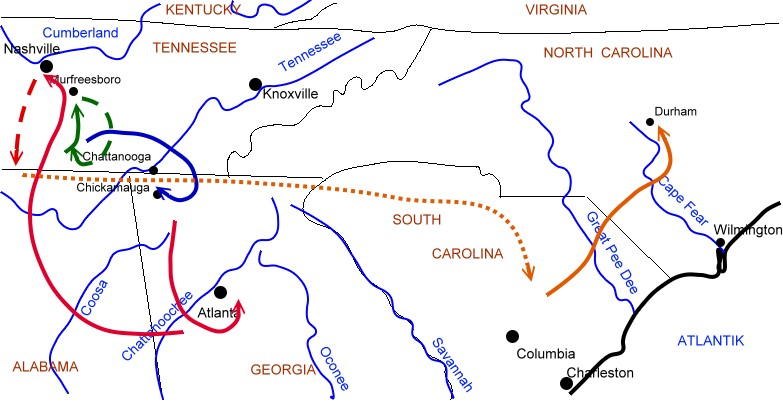
Movements of the Army of Tennessee, 1862 until 1865

- Confederate Heartland Offensive
- Battle of Stones River
- Chickamauga Campaign
- Battles of Chattanooga
- Atlanta campaign
- Franklin-Nashville Campaign
- Carolinas campaign
