= Leonidas Polk =

Confederate general and bishop (1806–1864)

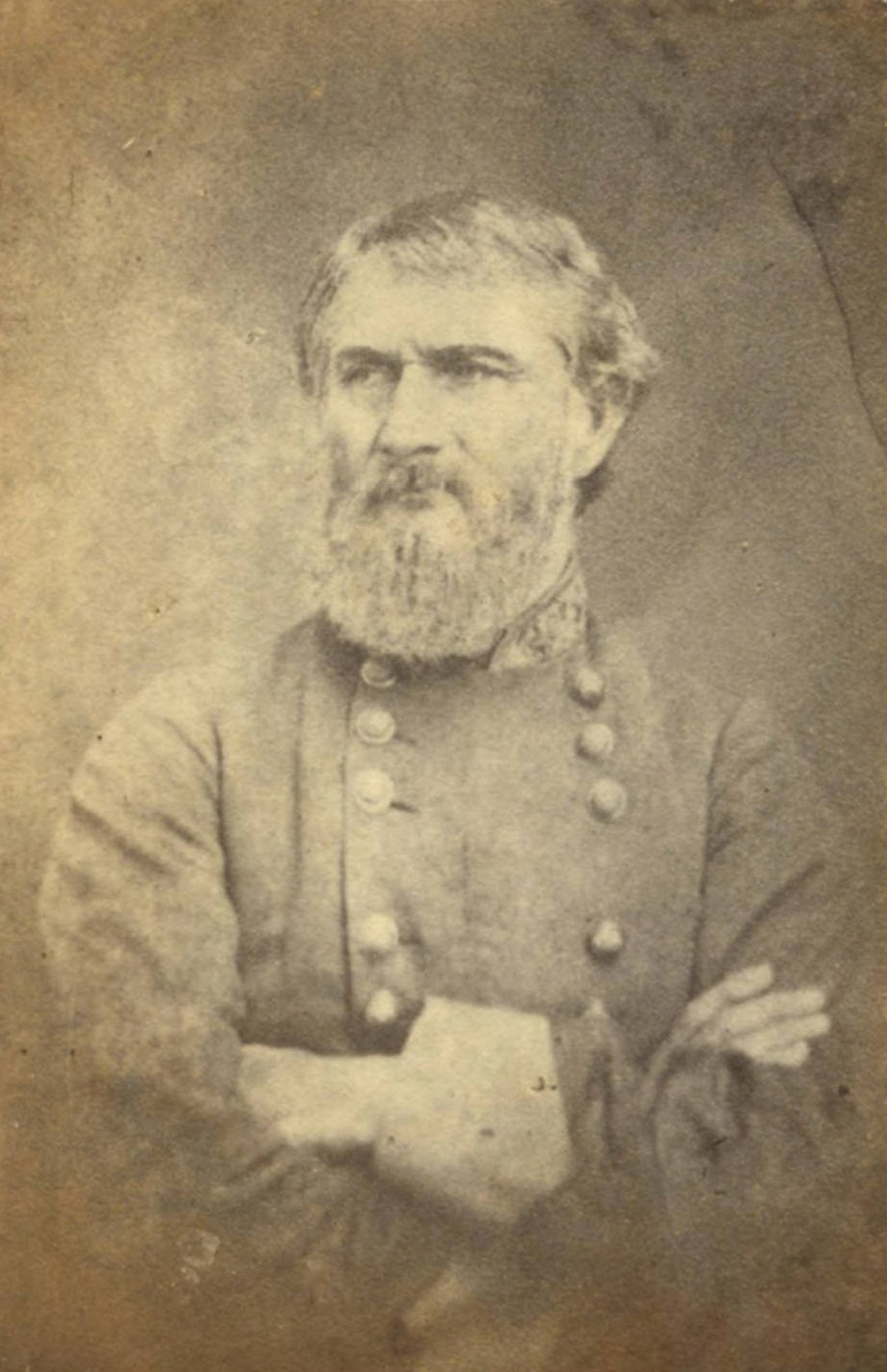
- Photograph of Polk in uniform, c. 1863–64
- Born: April 10, 1806; Raleigh, North Carolina, U.S.
- Died: June 14, 1864 (aged 58); Cobb County, Georgia, C.S.
- Burial place: Christ Church Cathedral, New Orleans
- Spouse: Frances Devereux (m. 1830)
- Children: 10, including William Mecklenburg Polk
- Military career
- Allegiance: United States; Confederate States
- Branch: United States Army; Confederate Army
- Service years: 1827 (U.S.); 1861–1864 (C.S.)
- Rank: Brevet Second Lieutenant (U.S.); Lieutenant-General (C.S.)
- Nicknames: "Sewanee's Fighting Bishop", "Bishop Polk"
- Commands: First Corps, Army of Tennessee; Army of Mississippi; Third Corps, Army of Tennessee
- Conflicts: American Civil War; Battle of Belmont; Battle of Shiloh; Battle of Perryville; Battle of Stones River; Battle of Chickamauga; Meridian Campaign; Atlanta campaign; Battle of Marietta †

The Right Reverend Leonidas Polk D.D.
- Bishop of Louisiana
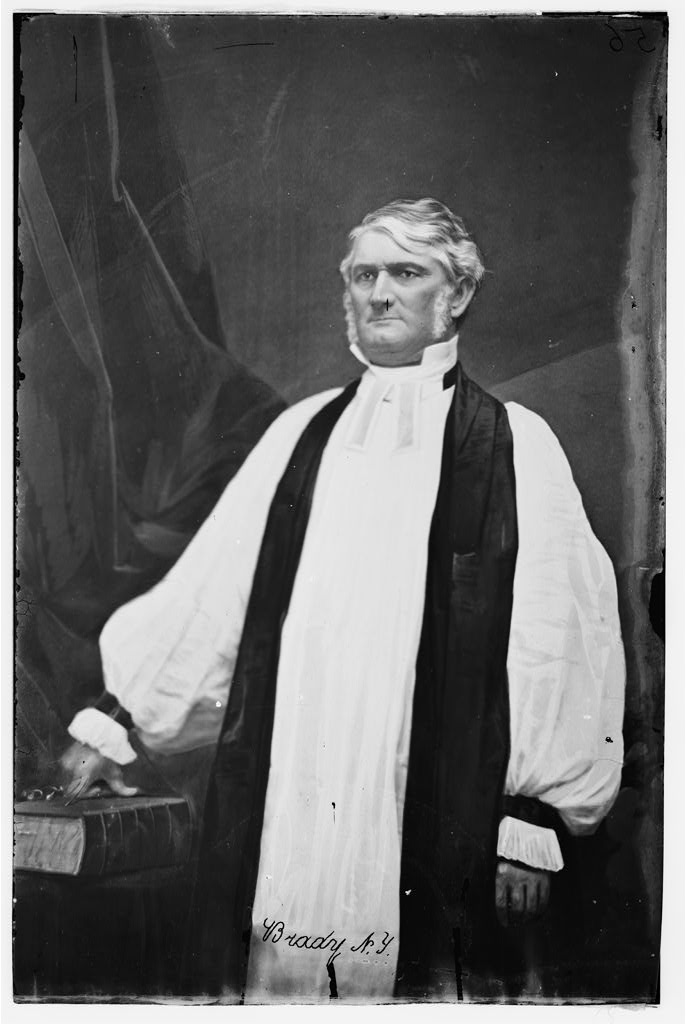
- Church: Episcopal Church
- Diocese: Louisiana
- Elected: October 16, 1841
- In office: 1841–1864
- Successor: Joseph Pere Bell Wilmer

Orders
- Ordination: May 22, 1831 by Richard Channing Moore
- Consecration: December 8, 1838 by William Meade

Leonidas Polk (April 10, 1806 – June 14, 1864) was a Confederate general, a bishop of the Episcopal Diocese of Louisiana and founder of the Protestant Episcopal Church in the Confederate States of America, which separated from the Episcopal Church of the United States. He was a planter in Maury County, Tennessee, and a second cousin of President James K. Polk. He resigned his ecclesiastical position to become a major-general in the Confederate States Army, when he was called "Sewanee's Fighting Bishop". His official portrait at the University of the South depicts him as a bishop with his army uniform hanging nearby. He is often erroneously referred to as "Leonidas K. Polk" but he had no middle name and never signed any documents as such.

Polk was one of the war's more notable, yet controversial, political generals. Recognizing his familiarity with the Mississippi Valley, Confederate president Jefferson Davis elevated Polk to a high military position despite his lack of combat experience. Polk commanded troops in the Battle of Shiloh, the Battle of Perryville, the Battle of Stones River, the Tullahoma campaign, the Battle of Chickamauga, the Meridian campaign, and the Atlanta campaign. He is remembered for his bitter disagreements with his immediate superior, the likewise controversial General Braxton Bragg of the Army of Tennessee, and for his limited success in combat. While serving under the command of General Joseph E. Johnston, he was killed in action in 1864 during the Atlanta campaign.

== Early life and education ==
Leonidas Polk was born in Raleigh, North Carolina, to Colonel William and Sarah (née Hawkins) Polk. William was a Revolutionary War veteran and prosperous planter. He was of Scottish and Anglo-Huguenot ancestry. Capitalizing on his position as chief surveyor of the central district of Tennessee, he acquired about 100,000 acres (400 km^{2}) of land.

Polk briefly attended the University of North Carolina at Chapel Hill before entering the United States Military Academy at West Point. During his senior year, he left the Scottish Calvinist church. He joined the Episcopal Church and was baptized in the Academy Chapel by Chaplain Charles P. McIlvaine, who later became the Episcopal Bishop of Ohio. Polk had an impressive academic record, excelling in rhetoric and moral philosophy. He graduated eighth of 38 cadets on July 1, 1827, and was appointed a brevet second lieutenant in the artillery.

Polk resigned his commission on December 1, 1827, to enter the Virginia Theological Seminary. He became an assistant to Bishop Richard Channing Moore at Monumental Church in Richmond, Virginia. Moore agreed to ordain Polk as a deacon in April 1830; however, on a visit to Raleigh in March, it was discovered that he had never been confirmed as an Episcopalian. To remedy the fact, before his ordination, he was hastily confirmed at St. John's Episcopal Church in Fayetteville, NC. He was then ordained a deacon as planned and a priest the following year. On May 6, 1830, Polk married Frances Ann Devereux, daughter of John Devereux and Frances Pollock; her mother was the granddaughter of Puritan theologian Jonathan Edwards. The Polks had eight children who survived to adulthood.

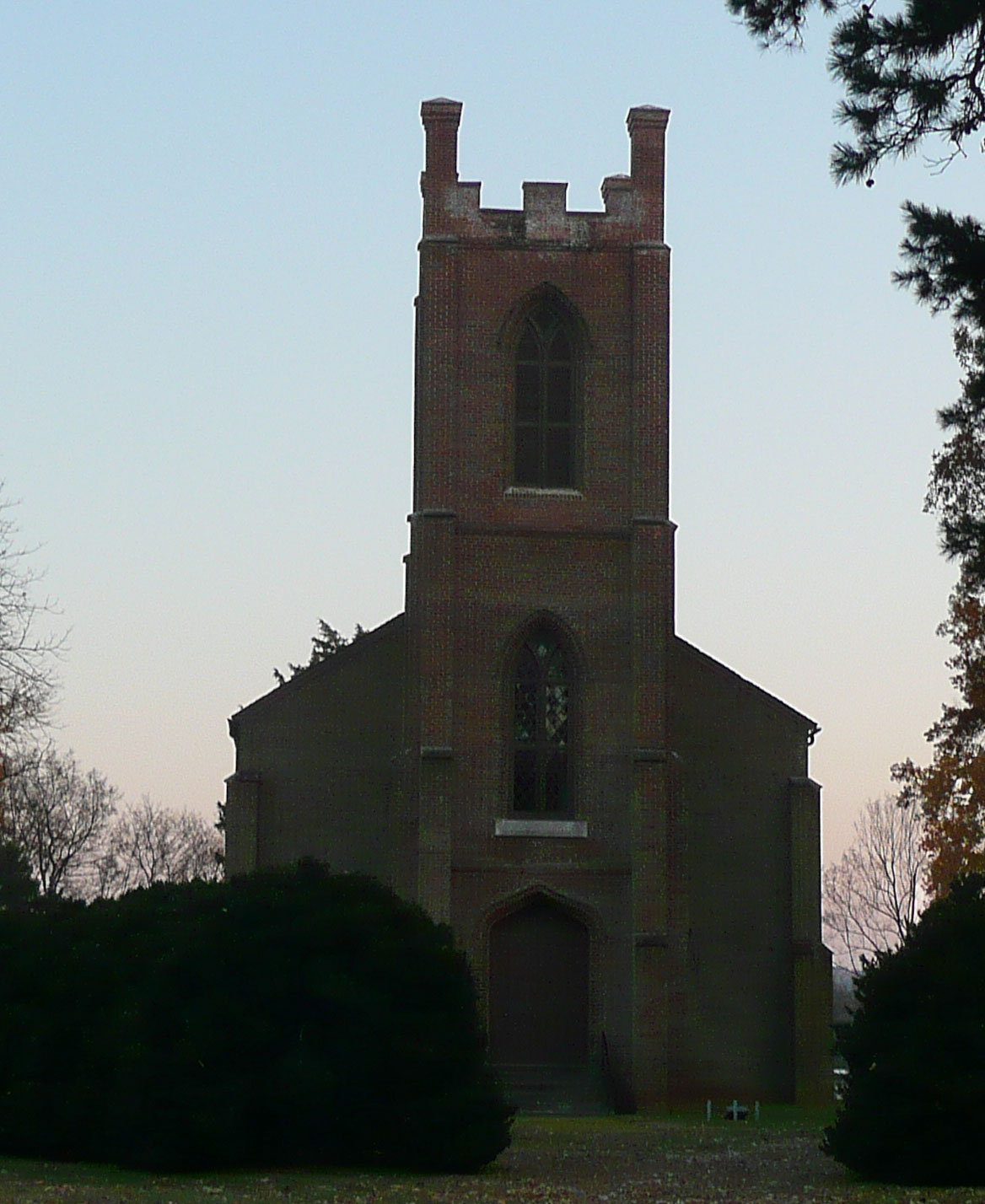
St. John's Church at Ashwood

In 1832, Polk moved his family to the vast Polk Rattle and Snap tract in Maury County, Tennessee, and constructed a massive Greek Revival home called Ashwood Hall. Polk was the largest slaveowner in the county in 1840, owning 111 slaves. (By 1850, the census recorded that Polk owned 400 slaves, but other estimates are as high as 1000.) He built a family chapel with his four brothers in Maury County, St. John's Church, at Ashwood. (Note: St. John's later became famous for its connection to Confederate general Patrick Cleburne, who remarked that it would be "worth dying to be buried in a place so beautiful." Two days later, he was killed at the Battle of Franklin and was buried for six years at St. John's.) He also served as priest of St. Peter's Church in Columbia, Tennessee. He was appointed Missionary Bishop of the Southwest in September 1838 and was elected first Bishop of Louisiana in October 1841. In 1848, he performed the marriage of his niece, Mary Bayard Devereux, to Major William John Clarke.

Polk was the leading founder of the University of the South in Sewanee, Tennessee, which he envisioned as a national university for the Southern United States and a New World equivalent to Oxford and Cambridge, both in England. (In his August 1856 letter to Bishop Elliott, he expounded on the secessionist motives for his university.) Polk laid and consecrated the cornerstone for the first building on October 9, 1860. Polk's foundational legacy at Sewanee is remembered through his portrait Sword Over the Gown, painted by Eliphalet F. Andrews in 1900. After the original was vandalized in 1998, a copy by Connie Erickson was unveiled on June 1, 2003. The title refers to the answer given by Polk "when asked in Richmond if he was putting off the gown of an Episcopal bishop to take up the sword of a Confederate general, to which he replied, 'No, Sir, I am buckling the sword over the gown,'" indicating that he saw it was his duty as a bishop to take up arms.

== American Civil War ==
=== Western Department ===
At the outbreak of the Civil War, Polk pulled the Louisiana Convention out of the Episcopal Church of the United States to form the Protestant Episcopal Church in the Confederate States of America. Although Polk hoped that secession would result in a peaceful separation of the slave states from the United States and suggested that he was reluctant to take up arms personally, he did not hesitate to write to his friend and former classmate at West Point, President Jefferson Davis, offering his opinions regarding the defense of the Mississippi Valley. Polk felt that the Southern preparations were seriously deficient and recommended the appointment of Albert Sidney Johnston as commander of the region, declaring that "a better man could not be found for that post." Davis concurred but Johnston was still in California at the time, and so he invited Polk to the Confederate Capitol in Richmond, Virginia, to discuss the Mississippi Valley defenses. Polk dined with Davis on two separate occasions and had discussions with General Robert E. Lee and several cabinet members. Surprisingly, Davis offered Polk the role of interim commander of Department No. 2 (roughly, the area between the Mississippi River and the Tennessee River), which was also known as the Western Department. Polk was hesitant to accept but informed a close friend that "I have therefore told Davis that while I should be glad to be excused from the responsibility, still if he can find no one... better, I will not shrink from it, notwithstanding an unfeigned diffidence of my capacity to do it as it should be done." Polk was commissioned a major general in the Confederate States Army on June 25, 1861, and made his way to Memphis, Tennessee, to assume command.

=== Missouri Campaign ===
Polk arrived in Memphis on July 13, 1861, and established his headquarters. In his General Order No. 1 to his troops, he justified the actions of the Confederate government: "We have protested, and do protest, that all we desire is to be let alone, to repose in quietness under our own vine and our own fig tree. We have sought, and only sought, the undisturbed enjoyment of the inherent and indefeasible right of self-government..." Polk's first task was to incorporate the forces of the Provisional Army of Tennessee into the regular army of the Confederacy. As a consequence of this process, the commander of the Tennessee troops, Major General Gideon Johnson Pillow, was demoted to second-in-command with a reduced rank of brigadier general. Pillow was infuriated by both his demotion and replacement by a bishop with no battlefield experience, and would prove himself a petulant and difficult subordinate. In late July, Polk ordered Pillow and 6,000 troops to board transports and steam up the Mississippi River to capture New Madrid, Missouri. The town was situated on a sharp bend of the river and artillery batteries positioned there could obstruct the passage of ships. Having accomplished this, Polk directed Pillow to occupy and fortify Island Number Ten, Tennessee, another strong defensive position, but his subordinate disobeyed the order and diverted the soldiers to eastern Missouri instead. Pillow wanted to use them in a proposed invasion of Missouri. Polk sharply rebuked Pillow and the two generals argued, with one observer noting: "Polk and Pillow are at loggerheads – Polk giving a command and Pillow countermanding it by the same messenger. Something must be done, and that quickly. Pillow, I learn, is acting on his own hook; will not give up his position as a senior general; denies Polk's authority to give him orders... We hope to hear that A.S. Johnston has been assigned to this command. General Polk is a sensible gentleman and will do well if he had proper cooperation." Polk threatened to report Pillow to Richmond, and Pillow eventually fell into line.

=== Invasion of Kentucky ===
Kentucky, a critical border state and slave state, had declared its neutrality between the United States and the Confederacy at the outbreak of Civil War. On August 28, 1861, Union Major General John C. Frémont issued orders to his subordinate, Brig. Gen. Ulysses S. Grant: "You are instructed to proceed forthwith to Cape Girardeau and assume command of the forces at that place... Colonel Waagner, chief of artillery at Cairo, left Saint Louis last night... to undertake an expedition with two gunboats, under Commander Rodgers, to Belmont, to destroy the fortifications erecting by the rebels, [and] keep possession of that place... It is intended, in connection with all these movements, to occupy Columbus, Kentucky, as soon as possible." The next day, Waagner and his regiment entered the village of Belmont, located across the Mississippi River from Columbus. His men began building fortifications at Belmont, quickly drawing the attention of Confederate forces. Concerned that the Union now threatened Columbus directly, Polk ordered Pillow and his troops to move into Kentucky and seize the towns of Hickman and Columbus. On the evening of September 3, 1861, Pillow's eager soldiers landed at Hickman, and the next day they entered Columbus, welcomed by residents waving Confederate flags.

Some historians contend that Polk committed one of the great blunders of the Civil War by dispatching troops to occupy Columbus. Polk's action prompted the Kentucky legislature to request U.S. aid to "expel the invaders", ensuring U.S. control of Kentucky for the remainder of the war. Thomas L. Connelly wrote that "Polk had made what was probably one of the greatest mistakes of the war." Steven E. Woodworth stated that "it was one of the most decisive catastrophes the Confederacy ever suffered." Nathaniel C. Hughes maintained that it was "a political blunder of the first order." However, other historians believe that the pro-Unionism of the Kentucky legislature and the unwillingness of the people of Kentucky to get involved in the Civil War made Polk's action less disastrous. Robert I. Girardi noted that "plans were in place for a Federal seizure of Columbus on September 5, but it is unlikely that, had the town been taken, the public outcry would have been as loud or the political consequences as great. Kentucky was all but locked up for the Union by the time of Polk's invasion."

When A.S. Johnston replaced Polk as commander of the Western Department in September 1861, he expanded the Confederate invasion of Kentucky by seizing Bowling Green and Cumberland Gap. Johnston realized that Kentucky neutrality could not be restored and looked to secure a greater military advantage for the Confederacy. Polk heavily fortified Columbus and installed 140 pieces of artillery. On January 20, 1862, Union General Henry W. Halleck wrote that "Columbus cannot be taken without an immense siege-train and a terrible loss of life. I have thoroughly studied its defenses; they are very strong." Polk's seizure of Columbus ensured that Federal navigation of the Mississippi River was blocked until the evacuation of the fortress in February 1862.

=== Battle of Belmont ===
On November 7, 1861, Grant launched a surprise attack against the Confederate camp at Belmont, aiming to disrupt the movement of Confederate troops into Missouri. The small Confederate force under Pillow was overwhelmed, as Grant's troops stormed the skirmish line, drove Pillow's men into disarray, and captured the camp. Across the river at Columbus, Polk watched the Battle of Belmont unfold from his fortified position and quickly dispatched reinforcements across the Mississippi River to support Pillow's faltering troops. The arrival of Polk's reinforcements turned the tide. The Confederates counterattacked, catching Grant's forces off-guard as they were withdrawing back to their naval transports. Polk crossed the river himself and assumed command of the Southern forces from Pillow. The artillery batteries at Columbus, including the "Lady Polk", the largest cannon in the army, named in honor of Polk's wife, bombarded Grant's troops. Under heavy fire and renewed pressure, the Union troops lost cohesion and fled from the battlefield. The Confederates viewed Belmont as a Southern victory, since Grant had staged an attack and been driven off. A.S. Johnston congratulated Polk, stating that "The 7th of November will fill a bright gap in our military annals, and be remembered with gratitude by the sons and daughters of the South." However, Polk was wounded nearby on November 11 when the Lady Polk exploded during a demonstration firing. The explosion killed two officers and several soldiers, and stunned Polk, requiring him to seek several weeks of recovery.

=== Evacuation of Columbus ===
The fall of Fort Henry in February 1862 meant that Columbus could now be outflanked by Union forces operating on the Tennessee River. General Pierre G.T. Beauregard ordered Polk to evacuate the fortress on February 20, 1862. Polk wrote afterwards: "The evacuation has been complete, and all are gone except myself and staff. Never was anything done with greater celerity, or so completely; for we left virtually nothing to our enemy but the works. Those I sadly regret. Columbus has filled the measure of its mission. It commanded and protected the valley of the Mississippi; we would have continued there with our small garrison had the center and right wing been able to stand... In five days we moved the accumulation of six months, taking with us all our commissary and quartermaster stores, an amount sufficient to supply my whole command for eight months, all our powder and other ammunition and ordnance stores... and every heavy gun in the forts." Polk's Columbus garrison was split, with some brigades sent to defend Island Number Ten, and others, including the general himself, to join in the concentration of Confederate forces at Corinth, Mississippi.

=== Battle of Shiloh ===
In April 1862, Polk commanded the First Corps of Albert Sidney Johnston's Army of Mississippi. Johnston ordered his forces to attack Grant's troops positioned at Pittsburg Landing, Tennessee, before they could be reinforced by Major General Don Carlos Buell's Army of the Ohio. The march of the Confederate army from Corinth to Pittsburg Landing was plagued by delays, and Beauregard, fearing that the element of surprise was lost, accused Polk's corps of causing the snarls of traffic along the roads. Beauregard stated: "I am very much disappointed at the delay which has occurred in getting the troops into position." Polk defended himself: "So am I, sir; but so far as I am concerned my orders are to form on another line, and that line must first be established before I can form upon it." The adjutant general of the army, Col. Thomas Jordan, later supported Polk, writing that "Polk's corps... seems to have been moved with as little delay as might be expected, and not to have been at all responsible for the delay of [Maj. Gen. Braxton] Bragg's troops." Beauregard wished to cancel the offensive, but Johnston, with Polk's support, over-ruled his second-in-command. Johnston remarked: "I would fight them if they were a million. They can present no greater front between these two creeks than we can, and the more men they crowd in there, the worse we can make if for them. Polk is a true soldier and a friend."

The Battle of Shiloh commenced in the early hours of Sunday, April 6, 1862. "Polk's corps, in columns of brigades, was massed behind Bragg's left. As [Maj. Gen. William J.] Hardee and then Bragg became heavily engaged reserve brigades were promptly moved to their assistance... Polk, in the center, with the two brigades of [Brig. Gen. Charles] Clark's division and Johnson's brigade of [Brig. Gen. Benjamin F.] Cheatham's, aided Hardee in driving back Sherman and McClernand and hurled repeated attacks at the Hornet's Nest." Polk was in the midst of the fighting and exposed himself to the hottest of the enemy's fire. When the Federal position in the Hornet's Next finally collapsed, Polk accepted the surrender and received the sword of Union division commander, Brig. Gen. Benjamin M. Prentiss. At the end of the day, Cheatham's division returned to its bivouac of Saturday night to obtain rations and ammunition. Polk accompanied it but did not inform Beauregard, who had assumed command of the army after the death of A.S. Johnston that afternoon. Heavy Union reinforcements arrived during the night.

On April 7, 1862, a fierce Union counterattack struck the Confederate army. Beauregard reported: "Just about the time (10.30am) when General McCook was assuming the offensive with his whole division, and was near pushing through the gap between General Breckinridge's left and General Bragg's right, caused by the absence of General Polk with one of his divisions, the latter arrived on the field... Dashing forward with drawn sword, at the head of Cheatham's fine division, he soon formed his line of battle at the point where his presence was so much needed, and, with unsurpassed vigor, moved on against a force at least double his own, making one of the most brilliant charges of infantry made on either day of the battle. He drove back the opposing column in confusion, and thus compensated for the tardiness of his appearance on the field." However, after another day of fighting, with no hope of reinforcement, Beauregard decided to withdraw the Army of Mississippi from the field and return to Corinth.

=== Battle of Perryville ===
Polk continued to serve as a corps commander during the Siege of Corinth, but when Beauregard took an unauthorized leave of absence to recuperate from his health issues following the successful evacuation of the town, President Davis took the opportunity to relieve Beauregard and replace him with Braxton Bragg. In the fall, during the invasion of Kentucky by Bragg and Maj. Gen. Edmund Kirby Smith, Polk was assigned command of the Right Wing of the army, consisting of the divisions of Gen. Cheatham and Gen. Jones Withers. By the end of September 1862, Bragg placed Polk in temporary command of the Army of Mississippi posted in and around Bardstown, Kentucky, while he visited Frankfort to preside over the inauguration of a Confederate governor for the state. Kirby Smith and two of his divisions joined Bragg at Frankfort. On October 1, 1862, Gen. Buell seized the initiative, "launching a four-pronged advance from Louisville. General Joshua Sill led fewer than 20,000 toward Frankfort while the bulk of the Army of the Ohio, some 55,000, moved in parallel columns toward Bragg's army, then under Polk's watch at Bardstown... Mistaking the smaller column marching toward Frankfort for Buell's main force, Bragg nevertheless decided that he had time to proceed with the inauguration as scheduled. He also saw the opportunity for an artful attack, and immediately ordered Polk to 'put your whole available force in motion by Bloomfield and strike [Buell] in flank and rear.' Bragg wished to use Kirby Smith's command as a blocking force from the east while Polk came up from the southwest and smashed into the Federals from the flank."

However, Polk disregarded the order from Bragg to attack the flank of the pursuing Union army near Frankfort. He only had 16,000 troops available and was justifiably concerned about the size of the Federal army in his front "Buell's intentions had since become clearer; the Federal main effort was clearly aimed at Bardstown, not Frankfort... [By] the morning of October 3, the Federals stood about a day's march from Bardstown. Moving as ordered would cause the Confederates to collide with McCook's 13,000 strong I Corps near Bloomfield, east of Bardstown. Fighting McCook would delay the Confederate movement to Frankfort and would enable the rest of Buell's army to concentrate and smash Polk's force."

Failing to hear the sound of battle, Bragg galloped to Perryville on the morning of October 8, 1862, "overcome with anger at Polk for not following his order to attack 'immediately.' Bragg's irritation also extended to what he believed was a small Yankee force trifling with him, delaying his plan to fight a major battle to the north. Bragg 'refused to believe that Buell's entire army was present or approaching the field.' From the moment he arrived in Perryville Bragg assumed overall command, and 'overruling any objections from Polk and Hardee, Bragg ordered an immediate offensive.'" The Battle of Perryville began again around Peters Hill as a Union division advanced up the pike, halting just before the Confederate line. After noon, a Confederate division struck the Union left flank, the I Corps of McCook, and forced it to fall back. One enduring legend of the Civil War is when Polk observed his subordinate, Maj. Gen. Cheatham, advancing his division, and Cheatham allegedly shouted, "Give 'em hell, boys!" Polk seconded the cheer while retaining the sensibility of a clergyman: "Give it to 'em, boys; give 'em what General Cheatham says!"

Bragg thoroughly despised ... the genial but pompous and often incompetent Bishop Polk. Bragg considered Polk "an old woman, utterly worthless", especially at disciplining men. Unfortunately for Bragg and for the Confederacy as a whole, Polk remained a great favorite of Jefferson Davis despite carefully couched hints from Bragg, which protected the irritatingly self-righteous Polk from the increasingly sycophantic Bragg and made his appointment to wing command a political necessity.

— Kenneth W. Noe, Perryville

When more Confederate divisions joined the fray, the Union line made a stubborn stand, counterattacked, but finally fell back with some units routed. Buell, several miles behind the action, was unaware that a major battle was taking place and did not send any reserves to the front until late in the afternoon. The Union troops on the left flank, reinforced by two brigades, stabilized their line, and the Confederate attack sputtered to a halt. Later, three Confederate regiments assaulted the Union division on the Springfield Pike but were repulsed and fell back into Perryville. Union troops pursued, and skirmishing occurred in the streets until dark. By that time, Union reinforcements were threatening the Confederate left flank. Bragg, short of men and supplies, withdrew during the night, and continued the Confederate retreat by way of Cumberland Gap into East Tennessee.

In the twilight of the day's battle, Polk was almost captured. He "rode through Liddell's soldiers to the next battle line and inquired, 'What troops are these?' The reply chilled him, 'The 22nd Indiana, Lt. Col. Squire Keith commanding.' Polk, the second highest-ranking Confederate on the battlefield, was now among Union troops. As Polk ordered him to cease firing, Keith asked, 'Who are you that gives this order?' General Polk again commanded him to cease firing or be court-martialed, which caused Keith to order his men to lower their weapons. The general rode along the 22nd's battle line, all the while feeling what he later described as 'a thousand centipedes... traveling up and down my backbone.' At the end, he spurred his horse back to Liddell's men and cried, 'General, every mother's son of them are Yankees! Open fire!'"

=== Army of Tennessee ===
After the battle of Perryville, Polk, Hardee, and Kirby Smith became disillusioned with Bragg's leadership. Kirby Smith refused to serve under Bragg again, and Polk and Hardee began a year-long campaign to get Bragg relieved of command. Polk hoped to use his close relationship with President Davis to accomplish his goal whereas Hardee was more covert. Polk traveled to Richmond and visited Davis soon after the Kentucky campaign to discuss the matter. Historians Thomas L. Connelly and Archer Jones wrote that "despite his spotty field performance and reputation for trouble-making in the army, Polk was a far deeper strategic thinker than historians have credited him with being. After the Kentucky campaign, Polk had also gone to Richmond to urge a unified western command." Despite the failure of the Kentucky campaign, Bragg was retained in command, but this did nothing to reduce the enmity between Polk and Bragg. Polk was promoted to lieutenant general on October 11, 1862, with date of rank of October 10. He became the second most senior Confederate of that rank during the war, behind James Longstreet. In November, the Army of Mississippi was renamed the Army of Tennessee and Polk commanded its First Corps until September 1863.

=== Battle of Stones River ===
Frustrated with his prospects in Kentucky and low on supplies, Bragg withdrew fully from Kentucky through the Cumberland Gap, passed through Knoxville and Chattanooga, turned northwest, and eventually stopped in Murfreesboro, Tennessee. His army, joined with Kirby Smith's Army of Kentucky and together renamed the Army of Tennessee as of November 20, took up a defensive position northwest of the city along the West Fork of the Stones River. President Abraham Lincoln had become tired of Buell's passivity and replaced him with Maj. Gen. William S. Rosecrans, victor of the recent battles of Iuka and Corinth. Rosecrans moved his XIV Corps (which was soon after designated the Army of the Cumberland) to Nashville, Tennessee, and was warned by Washington that he, too, would be replaced if he did not move aggressively against Bragg and occupy eastern Tennessee. However, Rosecrans took ample time to reorganize and train his forces (particularly his cavalry) and resupply his army. He did not begin his march in pursuit of Bragg until December 26, 1862.

On the night of December 30, "Bragg held a council of war. He planned to attack the next day up the Nashville Pike; such an assault would likely have failed. Polk countered with a plan to 'turn the enemy's right where we outflanked him'; Bragg agreed. The Confederate left would attack in a grand right wheel, pushing the Federals northeast toward the Nashville Pike and railroad in... a jackknife movement." The next day, a massive assault by the corps of Hardee, followed by that of Polk, overran the Federal wing commanded by McCook. A stout defense by the division of Brig. Gen. Philip Sheridan in the right center of the line prevented a total collapse, and the Union assumed a tight defensive position backing up to the Nashville Turnpike. Repeated Confederate attacks were repulsed from this concentrated line, most notably in the cedar "Round Forest" salient. Bragg attempted to continue the assault with the division of Maj. Gen. John C. Breckinridge, but the troops were slow in arriving and their multiple piecemeal attacks failed. Fighting resumed on January 2, 1863, when Bragg ordered Breckinridge to assault a lightly defended Union position on a hill to the east of the Stones River. Chasing the retreating Union forces, they were led into a deadly trap. Faced with overwhelming artillery, the Confederates were repulsed with heavy losses. Fearing the arrival of Union reinforcements, Bragg chose to withdraw his army on January 3 to Tullahoma, Tennessee. Once again, Bragg's subordinates politicked to remove their army commander after an unsuccessful battle (the battle was tactically inconclusive, but Bragg was unable to stop the advance of the Army of the Cumberland).

Despite his major contribution to the tactical planning of the Battle of Stones River, Polk performed rather poorly when executing it. He made a "spur-of-the-moment decision while his corps, positioned for battle, waited in line to advance... As things stood, Withers' division occupied the front with Cheatham lined up behind. Just before they went in, Polk decreed that Cheatham would command the two left brigades, front and rear, while Withers would control the corresponding brigades on the right. This order instantly placed half of his command under unfamiliar leadership without sufficient time to adjust." In addition, when directing the advance of his corps against the Federal positions during the battle of Stones River, Polk committed the error of employing piece-meal assaults, diluting the effectiveness of his offensive and adding to the slaughter of the attackers.

=== Tullahoma campaign ===
Following the costly but tactically inconclusive battle of Stones River, Bragg withdrew his army about 30 miles to the south, along the Duck River and behind the ridge known as the Highland Rim, which encircles the Nashville Basin. Bragg was unsuccessful in resisting Rosecrans's advance in the Tullahoma Campaign, which began to threaten the important city of Chattanooga. In the face of Rosecrans's expert maneuvering of his army, Polk counseled Bragg to retreat rather than stand and fight in their Tullahoma fortifications.

=== Battle of Chickamauga ===
Rosecrans eventually maneuvered Bragg out of Chattanooga, and the Army of Tennessee withdrew into the mountains of northwestern Georgia with the Army of the Cumberland in hot pursuit. Bragg planned to attack and destroy at least one of Rosecrans' corps, advancing separately over mountainous roads. "One such opportunity came and went at McLemore's Cove on September 10. To Bragg's intense frustration, the reluctant General Thomas C. Hindman (whose division was under Polk's corps but detached at that time, thus Bragg's order went directly to Hindman) and General Buckner dragged their feet in attacking a Union force that was nearly trapped within the cove." Bragg tried again. On the morning of September 12, 1863, he received intelligence from his cavalry scouts that one of Federal General Thomas L. Crittenden's divisions (Palmer's) was isolated on the Pea Vine Road two miles north of Polk's headquarters. He ordered Polk to attack at daylight on the 13th, and promised reinforcements in the form of Hindman's division and W.H.T. Walker's reserve force. However, Polk had conducted his own reconnaissance on the night of the 11th and found not an isolated division in his front, but three Federal divisions within two miles of the proposed point of attack. He notified Bragg and assumed a defensive posture, being heavily outnumbered. Bragg arrived at Polk's location on the morning of the 13th and was angered to find Polk's force not positioned for an assault but in a defensive line. Polk ordered Cheatham's division forward but Crittenden's force was no longer there. The Federal general had completed his concentration at Lee and Gordon's Mill on the night of the 12th. "Thus, before Polk was even ordered to attack, Crittenden was actually no longer in place."

Bragg was determined to reoccupy Chattanooga and decided to meet a part of Rosecrans's army, defeat it, and then move back into the city. On September 17 he headed north, intending to attack Crittenden's corps. As Bragg marched north on September 18, his cavalry and infantry fought with Union cavalry and mounted infantry, which were armed with Spencer repeating rifles. The two armies fought at Alexander's Bridge and Reed's Bridge, as the Confederates tried to cross the West Chickamauga Creek. The Battle of Chickamauga began in earnest on the morning of September 19. Bragg's men strongly assaulted but could not break the Union line. "During the evening of September 19, 1863, after the first full day of battle at Chickamauga, General Bragg made plans and issued orders for the following morning, involving a wholesale reorganization of the Confederate high command due to the arrival of General Longstreet that night at 11:00. Polk was to oversee the right wing with D.H. Hill, who would no longer independently command his own corps, but function instead as second-in-command under Polk. Longstreet was assigned the left wing. The battle plan consisted of an attack to open at daylight beginning on the Confederate right and moving en echelon toward the left. Longstreet was to hold his forces in position awaiting the sound of Polk's guns on the right."

However, the attack of Polk's right wing was delayed by about four hours. "Bragg provided only oral orders to Polk. Then, due to circuitous travels through the dark, foggy, forested wilderness during the night, neither Bragg's nor Polk's couriers were able to locate D.H. Hill, who in turn got lost seeking Polk's headquarters." The courier sent with written orders was not able to find Hill and returned to his unit without informing anyone. Gen. Breckinridge, one of Hill's division commanders, was at Polk's headquarters, but was not informed that his division was to initiate the dawn attack. At 5 a.m. on September 20, Polk was awakened on the cold and foggy battlefield to find that Hill was not preparing to attack. He prepared new written orders, which reached Hill about 6 a.m. Hill responded with a number of reasons for delaying the attack, including readjustments of the alignment of his units, reconnaissance of the enemy line, and issuing breakfast rations to his men. The delay allowed the Union defenders time to complete their field fortifications and repulse the Confederate offensive on the right. An enraged Bragg blamed Polk for the mix-up and wrote after the war that if it were not for the loss of these hours, "our independence might have been won."

In late morning, Rosecrans was misinformed that he had a gap in his line. In moving units to shore up the supposed gap, Rosecrans accidentally created an actual gap directly in the path of an eight-brigade assault on a narrow front by Longstreet. In the resulting rout, Longstreet's attack drove one-third of the Army of the Cumberland, including Rosecrans himself, from the field.

Chickamauga was a great tactical victory for Bragg. Still, instead of pursuing and destroying the U.S. army as it retreated, he laid siege to it in Chattanooga, concentrating his effort against the enemies inside his army instead of his enemies from the North. Bragg demanded an explanation from Polk on his failure to attack in time on September 20, and Polk placed much of the blame on Hill. Bragg wrote to President Davis, "Gen'l Polk by education and habit is unfit for executing the plans of others. He will convince himself his own are better and follow them without reflecting on the consequences." Bragg relieved Polk of his command and ordered him to Atlanta to await further orders. Although Polk protested the "arbitrary and unlawful order" to the Secretary of War and demanded a court of inquiry, he was not restored to his position. Davis once again retained Bragg in army command, despite the protestations of several of his subordinate generals.

=== Meridian campaign ===
President Davis transferred his friend Polk to command the Department of Mississippi and East Louisiana (December 23, 1863 – January 28, 1864) and then the Department of Alabama and East Mississippi (January 28 – May 4, 1864), giving him effective command of the state of Mississippi following the departure of Gen. Joseph E. Johnston to replace Bragg in command of the Army of Tennessee. The Meridian Campaign of February 1864 was a Union offensive led by Major General William T. Sherman aimed at crippling the Confederate war effort in central Mississippi. Targeting the vital railroad hub of Meridian, Sherman sought to destroy key infrastructure, disrupt Confederate supply lines, and demonstrate the vulnerability of the Southern interior. Sherman planned to take Meridian and, if the situation was favorable, push on to Selma, Alabama. He also wished to threaten Mobile enough to force the Confederates to reinforce their defenses. While Sherman set out on February 3, 1864, with the main force of 20,000 men from Vicksburg, he ordered Brig. Gen. William Sooy Smith to lead a cavalry force of 7,000 men from Memphis, Tennessee, south through Okolona, Mississippi, along the Mobile and Ohio Railroad to meet the rest of the Union force at Meridian.

Polk only had about 9,000 troops, and greatly outnumbered, he "decided not to give battle to Sherman's infantry. He ordered his cavalry, under Maj. Gen. Stephen D. Lee northward to cooperate with Maj. Gen. Nathan B. Forrest against Sooy Smith's advancing cavalry; he had hopes of destroying that arm of the Federal force. To [his infantry division commanders], however, he gave 'discretionary orders' to fall back whenever expedient... Polk's infantry and trains moved out of Meridian on February 14... This was a well-timed and well-directed withdrawal. All stores at Meridian and all at Enterprise 'except corn in the shuck' were saved. All shop tools and rolling stock 'except eight or ten cars' were likewise moved to safety... Sherman moved into Meridian the day Polk moved out." While Sherman and his army were waiting for Sooy Smith, he ordered his troops "to wipe the appointed meeting place off the map" by destroying the railroads and burning much of the area to the ground. Sherman is reported to have said, "Meridian with its depots, store-houses, arsenal, hospitals, offices, hotels, and cantonments no longer exists." Polk urged Forrest and Lee to defeat Sooy Smith, stating that if this could be achieved, Sherman's whole army "must come to a bad end." He later recorded that "if Sherman was deprived of [Sooy Smith's] presence and services to procure forage and subsistence for his army it must starve and destruction by starvation was as effectual as destruction by battle."

Sooy Smith's force retreated after running into Forrest and was then defeated at the Battle of Okolona on February 22, 1864. Having not heard from Sooy Smith, Sherman withdrew from Meridian and returned to Vicksburg. Polk reported to President Davis that "the vigorous action of my cavalry under General Lee kept [Sherman] so closed up that he could not spread out and forage. As an evidence of this, a drove of hogs of mine was on the way east and pursued a route within 6 miles on an average of his line of march without molestation and have arrived safely. He was deprived entirely of the rolling stock of all the roads between the Pearl and Tombigbee Rivers, as well as of the use of all the valuable stores which had been accumulated at depots on those roads... I have already taken measures to have all the roads broken up by him rebuilt, and shall press that work vigorously. The amount of road destroyed by him may be in all about 50 miles, extending out on the four roads from Meridian as a center." Polk's work crews repaired the damage to the railroad by March 24, 1864. The Memphis Daily Appeal wrote: "We think the repairing of the Mobile and Ohio road will compare with Yankee Enterprise." Historian Jeffrey N. Lash wrote that "Leonidas Polk [was] easily the Confederacy's ablest railroad general" for his efforts in the Meridian Campaign.

=== Atlanta campaign and Polk's death ===
In May 1864, Polk was ordered to send reinforcements to Gen. Joseph E. Johnston in Georgia, to aid that general in his resistance to Sherman's advance in the Atlanta campaign. Polk brought more than 14,000 men with him from Mississippi to Georgia. When he reported for duty at Dalton, Johnston "grasped his extended hand, and, warmly shaking it, said, 'How can I thank you? I asked for a division, but you have come yourself and brought me your army." Polk assumed command of the Third Corps of the Army of Tennessee on May 12, but his command remained commonly known as the "Army of Mississippi". Because of his elevated rank, Polk became the army's second in command under Johnston. On the evening of Polk's arrival, he and Lt. Gen. John B. Hood rode to Johnston's headquarters. Anticipating a great battle, Hood informed Polk that he wished to be baptized. "Nothing could have been more pleasing to the Bishop-General. 'The scene was a touching one,' Polk wrote to his wife. 'He with one leg, leaning on his crutches – a veteran in the midst of his and my officers and I the officiating minister. His heart was fully in it.'"

By using successive flanking maneuvers, Sherman forced Johnston to withdraw his army from strong defensive positions to protect the Confederate line of communication. This forced Johnston ever closer to the critically important city of Atlanta. After heavy fighting near Resaca, Polk received a letter from Johnston's wife: "You are never too much occupied I well know to pause to perform a good deed and will I am sure, even whilst leading your soldiers on to victory, lead my soldier nearer to God. General Johnston has never been baptized and it is the dearest wish of my heart that he should be and that you should perform the ceremony would be a great satisfaction to me... I rejoice that you are near him in these trying times. May God crown all your efforts with success and spare your life for your country and friends." On May 18, Johnston was baptized by Polk in the presence of Hood and Hardee.

On June 14, 1864, Polk was scouting enemy positions near Marietta, Georgia, with his staff when he was killed in action by a U.S. 3-inch (76 mm) shell at Pine Mountain. The artillery fire was initiated when Sherman spotted a cluster of Confederate generals — Polk, Hardee, and Johnston, with their staffs — in an exposed area. He pointed them out to Maj. Gen. Oliver Otis Howard, commander of the U.S. IV Corps, and ordered him to fire upon them. Battery I of the 1st Ohio Light Artillery, commanded by Capt. Hubert Dilger, obeyed the order within minutes. The first round from the battery came close and a second came even closer, causing the men to disperse. The third shell struck Polk's left arm, went through his chest, and exited, hitting his right arm, then exploded against a tree; it nearly cut Polk in two. Three little blood-stained books were found in Polk's pocket. Titled Balm for the Weary and Wounded, each had been inscribed to Generals Johnston, Hardee, and Hood, respectively, "with the compliments of Lieutenant General Leonidas Polk, June 12, 1864."

In the General Field Orders of June 14, 1864, Johnston informed the soldiers of the Army of Tennessee: "Comrades, you are called to mourn your first captain, your oldest companion in arms. Lieutenant General Polk fell today at the outpost of this army, the army he raised and commanded, in all of whose trials he shared, to all of whose victories he contributed. In this distinguished leader we have lost the most courteous of gentlemen, the most gallant of soldiers. The Christian patriot soldier has neither lived nor died in vain. His example is before you; his mantle rests with you."

== Legacy ==
My pen and ability is inadequate to the task of doing his memory justice. Every private soldier loved him. Second to Stonewall Jackson, his loss was the greatest the South ever sustained. When I saw him there dead, I felt that I had lost a friend whom I had ever loved and respected, and that the South had lost one of her best and greatest Generals.

— Private Sam Watkins, Co. Aytch

Although his record as a field commander was mixed, Polk was popular with his troops, and the Army of Tennessee deeply mourned his death. Polk's funeral service at Saint Paul's Church in Augusta, Georgia, was one of the most elaborate during the war. His friend Bishop Stephen Elliott of Georgia presided at the service, delivering a stirring funeral oration. He was buried in a location under the present-day altar. The church has a monument to Polk near the altar, and the original grave site can be visited. In 1945, his remains and those of his wife were reinterred at Christ Church Cathedral in New Orleans. His grave can be found in the front floor sanctuary, to the right of the pulpit. Fort Polk in Louisiana was named for Polk until 2023. (Note: In June 2025 it was renamed back to Fort Polk, this time in honour of General James H. Polk, former Commander in Chief of United States Army Europe.)

Polk's nephew, Lucius E. Polk, was also a Confederate general. Lucius E. Polk's son Rufus King Polk was a Congressman. Leonidas Polk's son, William Mecklenburg Polk, was a physician and a Confederate captain who later served as a First Lieutenant in the U.S. Army during World War I. He later authored his most flattering biography. William M. Polk's son, Frank Polk, served as a counselor to the U.S. Department of State through World War I and later became the first Under Secretary of State. Polk's portrait, done by Cornelius Hankins, was donated to Christ Church Cathedral in Nashville, Tennessee, by his grandson W. Dudley Gate, in 1963.

Military historian Steven E. Woodworth described the shell that killed Polk as "one of the worst shots fired for the Union cause during the entire course of the war", as Polk's incompetence made him far more valuable alive than dead: "Polk's incompetence and willful disobedience had consistently hamstrung Confederate operations west of the Appalachians, while his special relationship with the president made the bishop-general untouchable." Conversely, historian Joseph H. Parks wrote that "Polk was a competent corps commander, yet his frequent disagreements with Bragg would seem to indicate that he was at times hesitant in executing the orders of his superior. This charge, however, becomes less serious in view of the fact that all high ranking officers within the Army of Tennessee, distrusting Bragg's competence as a field commander, supported Polk in his apparent disregard of orders. Left unanswered was the question of whether or not the orders of a superior should be executed regardless of conditions or circumstances. Through it all, Polk's forgiving spirit was put to a severe test as he came to believe Bragg wished to saddle him with the responsibility for failure of the Army of Tennessee to win the victories expected of it."

== See also ==
- List of Confederate States Army generals
- List of people from Raleigh, North Carolina
