= Third Corps, Army of Tennessee =

- Active: 1862 – 1865
- Country: Confederate States of America
- Allegiance: Tennessee
- Branch: Confederate States Army
- Type: Army Corps
- Role: Infantry
- Size: 2-4 divisions
- Part of: Army of Tennessee
- Engagements: American Civil War

Commanders
- Notable commanders: Lt. Gen. William J. Hardee; Lt. Gen. Edmund Kirby Smith; Lt. Gen. Simon Bolivar Buckner; Lt. Gen. Leonidas Polk; Lt. Gen. Alexander P. Stewart

The Third Corps was a designation used by several military formations in the Army of Tennessee during the American Civil War. In practice, most Confederate corps were referred to by their commanders' name and not by numerical designation. In its various forms, the Third Corps served under William J. Hardee, Edmund Kirby Smith, Simon Bolivar Buckner, Leonidas Polk, and Alexander P. Stewart.

== Formation ==
The corps was originally formed by the re-designation of Major General William Hardee's division from the Central Army of Kentucky, also known as the Army of Central Kentucky, into a corps. Having previously served in Kentucky and Tennessee, Hardee's division was marched to Corinth in the personal accompaniment of General Albert Sidney Johnston as part of a strategic Confederate concentration leading up to the Battle of Shiloh. On March 23, 1862, Hardee's men arrived in Corinth where they joined other Confederates under the command of General P.G.T. Beauregard. When these forces were consolidated into a single army titled Army of the Mississippi, Hardee's division was designated the Third Corps. This "corps" remained a division in structure, consisting of three brigades under Brigadier Generals Thomas Hindman, Patrick Cleburne, and S.A.M. Wood. Additionally, an artillery battalion of three Arkansas batteries under Major Francis Shoup was also attached to the corps. Hardee's effective force numbered 6,789 and was the smallest of the four corps in the army.

Hardee's corps was selected to lead one of the two Confederate columns in the march from Corinth. The army would concentrate at Mickey's farmhouse and then launch an attack upon Grant's Army of the Tennessee encamped at Pittsburgh Landing on April 4. Hardee was to move his corps up along the Ridge Road, followed by the First Corps under Major General Leonidas Polk. However, Hardee's and Polk's troops became inter-tangled in the streets of Corinth, delaying the march. Though they had departed in the morning, it was late into the afternoon by the time the last of Hardee's corps had left Corinth. Poor staff work combined with muddy roads and conditions delayed the march, and thus the attack, well past the April 4th target date. It was not until the morning of April 6th that the Confederates were into position to make the attack.

Largely because of its position at the head of the line of march and camp, Hardee's corps found itself at the spearhead of the attack on the morning of April 6th. Hardee's corps deployed in single line of battle arrayed from left to right; Cleburne's brigade on the left resting near Widow Howell field, Wood's brigade in the center, and Hindman's brigade under the temporary command of Colonel Robert Shaver on the right. To extend Hardee's frontage, Brigadier General Adley H. Gladden's brigade was attached to Hardee from Major General Braxton Bragg's Second Corps and posted on Shaver's right. With this additional brigade, Hardee decided to form his corps into two temporary divisions; the first under Hindman and consisting of Wood's brigade and his own under Shaver. The second division consisted of Cleburne's and Gladden's brigades and reported directly to Hardee himself. The rest of Bragg's corps deployed in a single line of battle behind Hardee's corps, with Polk's corps in column of march behind Bragg's corps, and Breckinridge's corps bringing up the rear.

Thus it was Hardee's corps that became the first Confederates engaged in the Battle of Shiloh when a Federal patrol under Major James Powell from Colonel Everett Peabody's brigade stumbled into a cavalry outposts and pickets from Major Aaron Hardcastle's 3rd Mississippi Battalion of Wood's brigade. This skirmish lasted for about an hour before Powell's Federals fell back. In the meanwhile, the Confederate offensive began. In the initial advance, the elements of the corps became separated, with Hindman's two brigades and Gladden advancing towards the northeast and right into the camps of Brigadier General Benjamin Prentiss's 6th Division, while Cleburne's brigade advanced more northerly and to left, into the camps of Brigadier General William T. Sherman's 5th Division. Russell's brigade of Polk's corps advanced to fill the gap in between the two widening segments of the corps. It was a similar story elsewhere, and before long the Confederate advance had lost organization, with mixed units of different corps forming ad-hoc commands and advancing without regard to table of organization.

Cleburne's brigade advanced Sherman's position, with his skirmishers of the 15th Arkansas and 6th Mississippi wounding an unsuspecting Sherman in the hand and killing his aide Private Thomas Holliday. However, Cleburne's attack became bogged down in the marshy terrain, briars, and lowground in front of Sherman's position, and his men suffered significant casualties in the attack. Notably, the 6th Mississippi, which started the battle with 425 officers and men, suffered more than 300 casualties in this attack alone.

The corps was later engaged at Bloody Pond and assisted Breckinridge's Reserve Corps in the rearguard. Fighting at Corinth, the corps served successfully for a few more months until the four corps of the Army of the Mississippi were consolidated and the corps discontinued. The brigades which made up the corps later constituted a division under Simon Buckner, and then more famously, Patrick Cleburne.

== 1862 recreation ==
The Third Corps was re-constituted four more times following its abolition. First it was re-constituted when Edmund Kirby Smith's command from East Tennessee was attached to the Army of Tennessee. Kirby Smith's corps consisted of Carter Stevenson's division, the largest at 10,000 men, John McCown's division of 5,500, Henry Heth commanded a division of 4,500 men and lastly Thomas Churchill commanded a division of 6,500 men all in all 26,500. The corps never was fully engaged in any major battle, at Cumberland Gap the corps was lightly engaged. The corps would have fought at Stones River but Stevenson's division was ordered to Vicksburg, Heth and Churchill went to Knoxville which left only John McCown and his small division. This proved to be a key factor in the battle and many say if Braxton Bragg had Smith and his four divisions, he may have won decisively, not only tactically.

With that, the corps broke up. McCown was assigned to Hardee's corps, and thus his division became a permanent part of the Army of Tennessee. Stevenson's division remained at Vicksburg, the remaining divisions were put under new departments and thus the corps was abolished.

The corps was again reconstituted for was at the Siege of Vicksburg. With so many of the Army of Tennessee's units at Vicksburg area, the garrison seemed like part of their own army and additionally nearly the entire garrison fought with the Army of Tennessee sometime or another. The Corps consisted of Forney's division, 4,500 men, Martin Smith's division with another 6,500, William Loring's division of 6,000 more, John Bowen's division of 6,000 and Carter Stevenson's division of 10,000. The Corps all in all numbered 33,000 men. The Corps fought at Champion Hill, and the siege itself. Loring and his division broke out and later on served in two other Third Corps but the rest of the 'Corps', usually known as the Army of Mississippi, surrendered on July 4.

A Third Corps (although seldom so-called) was again re-constituted under Joseph Johnston during the Vicksburg campaign. The corps contained many troops from both the Army of Mississippi and the Army of Tennessee. The corps contained Loring's division after it broke out, 6,000, Wallker's division from Charleston with 10,000, John Breckinridge from the Army of Tennessee with 10,000 more, Jackson's division from the Army of Tennessee with 6,000 and finally a command of five disorganized brigades numbering 10,000 more. All in all 42,000 men at its height. This Corps though was dispersed and then was abolished though its fragments later became part of another III corps.

The corps was reconstituted again during the Chickamauga Campaign. Braxton Bragg created an additional corps for the Army of Tennessee by consolidating Simon Buckner's command from the Department of East Tennessee into his army. Buckner's corps consisted of three divisions: Alexander P. Stewart's division with 4,500 men, William Preston's division with 5,000 men, and a provisional division under Bushrod Johnson with 6,000 more. Johnson's division was detached to operate with Longstreet's corps at Chickamauga however, and was broken up shortly after the battle.

== Final reappearance ==
The Third Corps was re-raised for a fifth and final time. It was organized after the battle of Chattanooga when Leonidas Polk's Army of Mississippi went east to join the Army of Tennessee in the Atlanta campaign. It contained divisions under William Loring with 6,500 men, veterans from the Vicksburg Campaign. It also contained a division of 7,500 under Samuel French from Mississippi and finally 6,000 men from Mobile under general Cantey (later under Walthall). All in all, 20,000 men. This corps took the right flank of the Army of Tennessee at Rocky Face Ridge and the left flank at Resaca. Polk's corps also fought also at Pine Mountain where Polk was killed.

The command switched hands five times during the campaign, first to W.W. Loring for the rest of the battle, but then Alexander P. Stewart took command briefly.

Stewart's corps fought heavily at Peachtree Creek, where it broke through George Henry Thomas's lines. At Atlanta the corps was in reserve. Soon after, Stewart's corps took part in the Battle of Ezra Church, where Walthall's division was committed in an attack to support Lee's corps. The attack failed, and Stewart and division commander Loring were wounded the fighting. Stewart's corps also not take part in the Jonesboro. The corps, while the smallest in the army suffered the least between the three Corps.

== Franklin–Nashville ==
When army commander John Bell Hood invaded Tennessee, Stewart's corps went with it. It fought heavily at Allatoona Pass, and assaulted the Union left at the disastrous Battle of Franklin. Suffering heavy losses, the corps was merely a large division once it arrived at Nashville. Stewart's corps was on the left flank for the first part of the battle, where it suffered heavily. It was later transferred to the center where it suffered lightly by muskets but fled the field.

The corps went to the Carolinas afterwards, fighting at the Battle of Bentonville. It surrendered with the rest of the army.
