= Army of Mississippi =

Confederate States army unit

There were three formations known as the Army of Mississippi in the Confederate States Army during the American Civil War. This name is contrasted against Army of the Mississippi, which was a Union army named for the Mississippi River, not the state of Mississippi.

== Army of Mississippi (March 1862) ==
This army, at times known by the name Army of the West was one of the most important in the western theater, fighting at Shiloh, Corinth, and Perryville. It was organized on March 5, 1862, and portions of the Army of Pensacola were added on March 13. It was consolidated with the Army of Central Kentucky and the Army of Louisiana on March 29. On November 20, 1862, it was renamed the Army of Tennessee.

=== Command history ===
Commander	From	To	Major Battles and Campaigns
Gen. P.G.T. Beauregard	March 5, 1862 (assumed March 17, 1862)	March 29, 1862	
Gen. Albert Sidney Johnston (KIA)	March 29, 1862	April 6, 1862	Shiloh
Gen. P.G.T. Beauregard	April 6, 1862	May 6, 1862	
Gen. Braxton Bragg	May 6, 1862 (assumed May 7, 1862)	July 5, 1862	Corinth
Maj. Gen. William J. Hardee (temp)	July 5, 1862	August 15, 1862	
Gen. Braxton Bragg	August 15, 1862	September 28, 1862	
Lt. Gen. Leonidas Polk (temp)	September 28, 1862	November 7, 1862	Perryville
Gen. Braxton Bragg	November 7, 1862	November 20, 1862	

== Army of Mississippi (December 1862) ==
The second army was referred to as the Army of Vicksburg. It was organized December 7, 1862, by troops in the Department of Mississippi and East Louisiana, including the short-lived Army of West Tennessee. Its sole function was to defend Vicksburg, Mississippi, on the Mississippi River. It ceased to exist when southern General John C. Pemberton surrendered it after a long offensive campaign and siege to Major General Ulysses S. Grant on July 4, 1863, opening up the "Father of Waters" to Union control and splitting the Confederacy in two.

=== Command history ===
Commander	From	To	Major Battles and Campaigns
Lt. Gen. John C. Pemberton	December 7, 1862	December 9, 1862	
Maj. Gen. Earl Van Dorn (temp)	December 9, 1862	December 17, 1862	
Lt. Gen. John C. Pemberton	December 17, 1862	July 4, 1863	Vicksburg Campaign

== Army of Mississippi (1863–64) ==
The third army was retitled III Corps, Army of Tennessee, around May 4, 1864, but it continued to use the former name.

=== Command history ===
Commander	From	To	Major Battles and Campaigns
Lt. Gen. William J. Hardee	July 30, 1863	October 23, 1863	
Lt. Gen. Leonidas Polk	October 23, 1863	June 14, 1864	Atlanta campaign
Maj. Gen. William W. Loring	June 14, 1864	July 4, 1864	
