= Robert Franklin Beckham =

Confederate States of America military officer

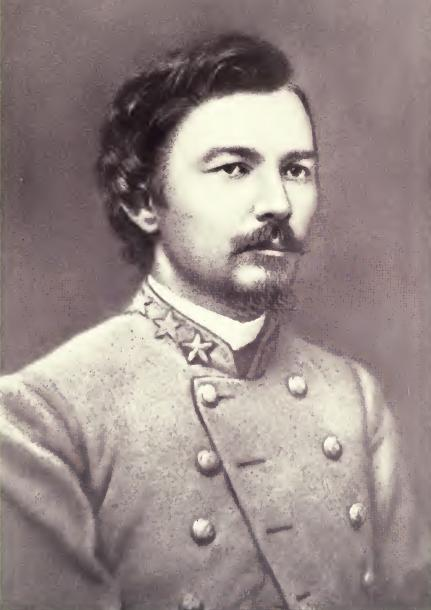
- Robert Franklin Beckham
- Born: May 6, 1837; Culpeper, Culpeper County, Virginia
- Died: December 5, 1864 (aged 27); Ashwood, Maury County, Tennessee
- Burial place: St. John's Churchyard, Ashwood, Maury County, Tennessee
- Military career
- Allegiance: United States of America; Confederate States of America
- Branch: United States Army; Confederate States Army
- Service years: 1859–61 (USA); 1861–64 (CSA)
- Rank: Second Lieutenant (USA); Colonel (CSA)
- Conflicts: American Civil War

Robert Franklin Beckham (May 6, 1837 – December 5, 1864) was a Confederate military officer who commanded a horse artillery battalion under John B. Hood and in the Army of Tennessee. He was mortally wounded at Columbia, before the Battle of Franklin on November 29, 1864.

== Early life ==
Beckham was born in Culpeper, Virginia. He graduated from the United States Military Academy at West Point as a member of the class of 1859. Beckham ranked 6th in his class of 22. He then served as a lieutenant in the United States Engineers until 1861 and the outbreak of the Civil War.

== Civil War ==
When the Civil War began, Beckham commanded an artillery battery which he led at the First Battle of Bull Run. He then joined the staff of General Gustavus W. Smith in January 1862, playing a key role at the Battle of Seven Pines. Beckham was subsequently elected captain of the Jeff Davis Artillery on March 31, 1862 but did not accept, continuing to serve as an ordnance office at the rank of major. Upon Stuart's request, Beckham was assigned to command the Stuart Horse Artillery on April 8, 1863, after the death of Major John Pelham.

Beckham served as an officer under Stonewall Jackson at the Battle of Chancellorsville and received a commendation for gallantry from J.E.B Stuart at the Battle of Brandy Station. He also managed the administration and refitting of Stuart’s artillery batteries.

In February 1864, Beckham was transferred west to command the artillery of the II Corps of the Army of Tennessee. He was promoted to colonel. While in command of the artillery, he was mortally wounded while commanding his guns at Columbia, the day before the Battle of Franklin, on November 29, 1864, dying several days later on December 5. He was buried in St. John's Churchyard in Ashwood, Tennessee.
