= Senator Polk (disambiguation) =

Trusten Polk (1811–1876) was a U.S. Senator from Missouri from 1857 to 1862. Senator Polk may also refer to:

- Charles Polk Jr. (1788–1857), Delaware State Senate
- John A. Polk (1949–2026), Mississippi State Senate
- Lucius E. Polk (1833–1892), Tennessee State Senate
- Lucius Junius Polk (1802–1870), Tennessee State Senate
- VanLeer Polk (1858–1907), Tennessee State Senate
