= Walnut Grove (Mount Pleasant, Tennessee) =

Historic house in Tennessee, United States

- U.S. National Register of Historic Places
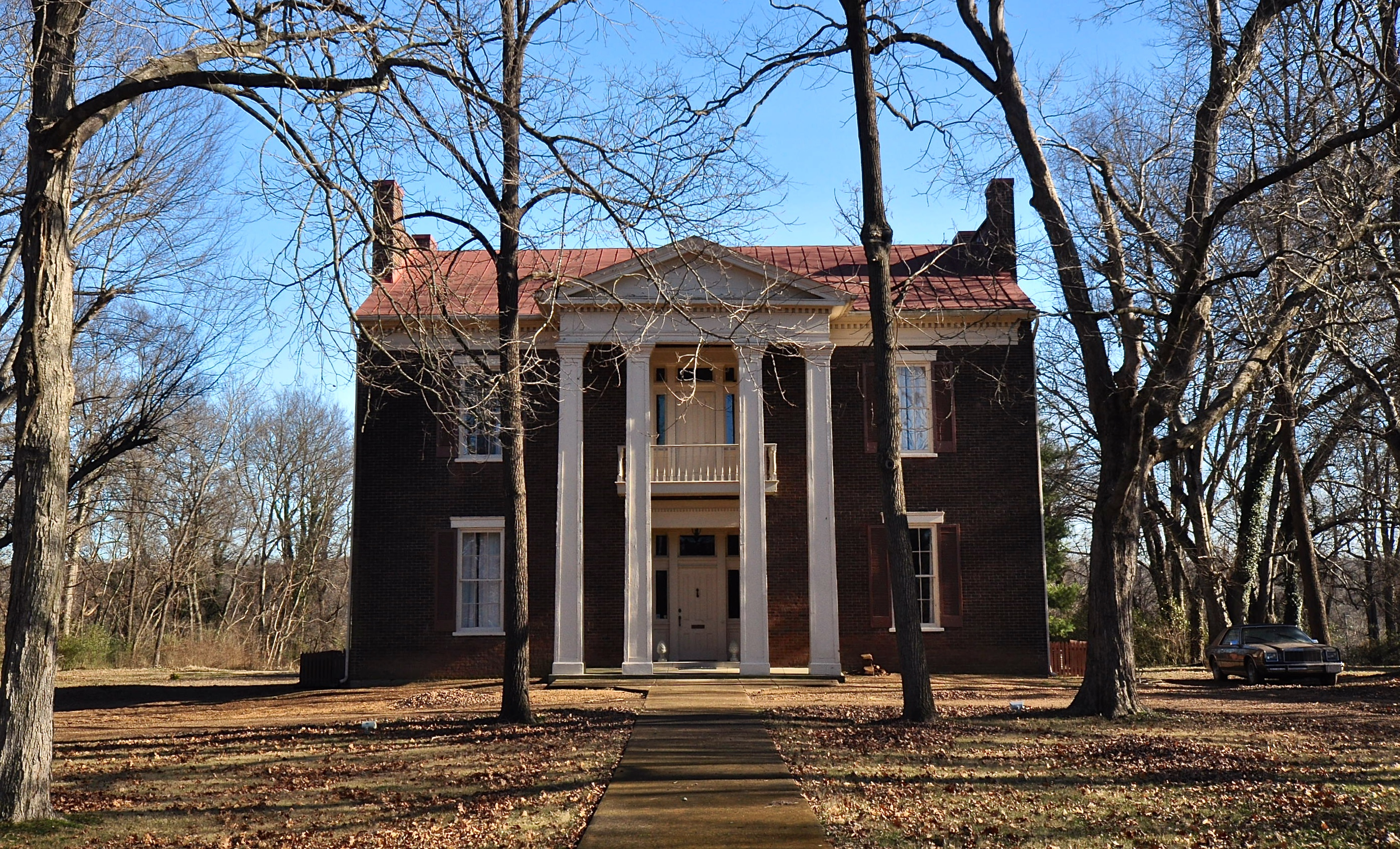
- Walnut Grove in 2015

- Location within Tennessee Location within the United States
- Location: 510 N. Main St., Mt. Pleasant, Tennessee
- Coordinates: 35°32′25″N 87°12′11″W
- Area: 3.8 acres (1.5 ha)
- Built: 1858
- Architect: Nathan Vaught
- Architectural style: Greek Revival
- NRHP reference No.: 84003641
- Added to NRHP: March 8, 1984

Walnut Grove is a historic house on a Southern plantation in Mount Pleasant, Maury County, Tennessee, USA.

== History ==
The house was completed in 1858, replacing an earlier house that burned and was torn down in 1857. It was designed in the Greek Revival architectural style by Nathan Vaught, a local master builder.

The house was built for Sabrina (Sabra) Boddie Lawrence, who inherited a large plantation and the previous house in 1841. She personally managed the plantation and at the start of the American Civil War was a prominent local landowner, owning almost as much land as any other person in the county.

After Lawrence died in 1867, her heirs sold or leased the house for an Episcopal school for boys around 1880, known has Otey school; the house was used for a few years as a dormitory. It was sold in 1888 and returned to use as a private home. A detached kitchen still exists on the property, built prior to 1826 and surviving the 1857 fire; according to local lore it is the oldest brick building in the Mount Pleasant area.

The house and property was bought by private owners in 2018. The home has been updated where the six inch flooring has been repaired and refurbished as well as the brick on both buildings. It maintains the look and feel of the original home.

== Heritage significance ==
It has been listed on the National Register of Historic Places since March 8, 1984, significant as an example of late 1850s Greek Revival style and its association with Lawrence and with Nathan Vaught.
