= Pillow-Bethel House =

Historic house in Tennessee, United States

- U.S. National Register of Historic Places
- Location within Tennessee Location within the United States
- Nearest city: Columbia, Tennessee
- Coordinates: 35°34′5″N 87°6′56″W
- Built: 1855
- Architect: Nathan Vaught
- Architectural style: Ante bellum/ Greek Revival
- NRHP reference No.: 76001785
- Added to NRHP: 1976

Pillow-Bethel House is an historic mansion located off U.S. Route 43 in the city of Columbia, Maury County, Tennessee, United States. The mansion is one of three, built by master builder Nathan Vaught in 1855, for Jerome and Martha Harris Pillow. The other two were Clifton Place (Mt. Pleasant Hwy.) and Pillow Place (Campbellsville Pike Rd.), also known as Pillow-Haliday Place.

The mansion was placed on the National Register of Historic Places listings in Maury County, Tennessee on December 12, 1976.

== History ==
Pillow-Bethel House was built for Jerome Bonaparte Pillow (1809 in Tennessee – 1891 in Mt. Pleasant, Tennessee), the youngest son of Gideon Pillow, and brother to General Gideon J. Pillow (1806 in Williamson County, Tennessee – 1878 in Mound Plantation, Phillips County, Arkansas), that owned Clifton Place, and Major Granville A. Pillow (1805 in Columbia, Tennessee – 1868 in Clifton, Tennessee), that owned Pillow-Haliday Place. Vaught was the brother-in-law of Edward W. Dale, whose daughter Elvira had married Jerome's son, Jerome Bonaparte (Jr.) Pillow designed and built the mansion that was very similar to both the other homes. All three mansions were two-story with pedimented portico's, columns that went from the top to the ground. The Pillow-Bethel House (as were the others) was constructed from brick made on the property and besides the house there were servants quarters, a detached kitchen, carriage barn, and stables. There was also a small building thought to be a law office. Captain William Decatur Bethel married one of Jerome's daughters thus giving the name Pillow-Bethel House to the property.
