= Nathan Vaught =

Nathan Vaught (died 1880) was a builder in Tennessee who was responsible for several noteworthy buildings.

A "master builder" from Maury County, Vaught was responsible for construction of The Athenaeum in Columbia, Tennessee. One of his works, Walnut Grove, in Mt. Pleasant, Tennessee, is a Greek Revival style building that was built in 1858. He built antebellum homes and some commercial structures. Many of his works are listed on the U.S. National Register of Historic Places. He died April 9, 1880, and is buried in Rose Hill Cemetery, in Columbia, Tennessee.

Works include:

- One or more works within Ashwood Rural Historic District, which spans US 43 between Columbia and Mount Pleasant, Columbia, TN, NRHP-listed
- The Athenaeum, 808 Athenaeum St., Columbia, TN, NRHP-listed
- Clifton Place, SW of Columbia on Mt. Pleasant Hwy., Columbia, TN, NRHP-listed
- Columbia West End Historic District, Roughly along W. Seventh St. between Frierson St. and the Seaboard System RR, Columbia, TN, NRHP-listed
- Elm Springs, Mooresville Pike, Columbia, TN, NRHP-listed
- Fairmont, Mooresville Pike, Columbia, TN, NRHP-listed
- Hamilton Place, Mt. Pleasant Pike, W of Columbia off U.S. 43, Columbia, TN, NRHP-listed
- Pillow Place, Campbellsville Pike, Columbia, TN, NRHP-listed
- Pillow-Bethel House, SW of Columbia off U.S. 43, Columbia, TN, NRHP-listed
- Marymont Mansion 1124 Rucker Lane, Murfreesboro, TN NRHP-Listed
- State Bank of Tennessee, 201 W. 7th St., Columbia, TN, NRHP-listed
- Absalom Thompson House, S of Spring Hill on Denning Rd, Spring Hill, TN, NRHP-listed
- Walnut Grove, 510 N. Main St., Mt. Pleasant, TN, NRHP-listed
- Beechwood Manor, Carters Creek Pike, Columbia, TN
