= Pillow Place =

Historic house in Tennessee, United States

- U.S. National Register of Historic Places
- Location within Tennessee Location within the United States
- Nearest city: Columbia, Tennessee
- Coordinates: 35°34′17″N 87°04′52″W
- Built: 1850
- Architect: Nathan Vaught
- Architectural style: Ante bellum/ Greek Revival
- NRHP reference No.: 83004271 Pillow-Haliday Place
- Added to NRHP: December 8, 1983

Pillow Place also known as Pillow-Haliday Place is an historic plantation mansion located southwest of the city of Columbia, Maury County, Tennessee on Campbellsville Pike.

== History ==
Gideon Pillow, a surveyor that had moved to Maury County, left 500 acres (200 ha) to be divided among his three sons. The Pillow-Haliday Place mansion and plantation buildings were built by master builder Nathan Vaught in 1850, for Major Granville A. Pillow (b.1805 in Columbia, TN; d.1868 in Clifton, TN), and was the second of three Pillow homes built. Vaught also built Clifton Place (1839) for Gideon Johnson Pillow, and Pillow-Bethel House (1855) for Jerome Bonaparte Pillow. The three mansions were closely designed but Pillow Place lacked the second story gallery and the portico had a low parapet at the top instead of a pediment. The mansion was built on the site of Gideon Pillow's old home.

== NRHP ==
The mansion was placed on the National Register of Historic Places listings in Maury County, Tennessee on December 8, 1983.
