= Hamilton Place (Columbia, Tennessee) =

Historic house in Tennessee, United States

- U.S. National Register of Historic Places
- Location within Tennessee Location within the United States
- Nearest city: Columbia, Tennessee
- Coordinates: 35°34′18″N 87°9′11″W
- Area: 9 acres (3.6 ha)
- Built: 1832
- Built by: Nathan Vaught
- Architectural style: Greek Revival, Georgian
- NRHP reference No.: 73001812
- Added to NRHP: July 16, 1973

Hamilton Place is an antebellum plantation house in Maury County, Tennessee, near Columbia.

The house was completed in 1832. It was built for Lucius Junius Polk, a wealthy cotton planter who served as a state senator and later as Tennessee's adjutant-general, by master builder Nathan Vaught. The Palladian design of its front facade is based on Palladio's design for the Villa Pisani at Montagnana. The interior floor plan was loosely based on the White House floor plan, and an interior arcade is styled after a design by Brunelleschi for a hospital in Florence, Italy.

Hamilton Place was listed on the National Register of Historic Places in 1973. It is across the highway from Rattle and Snap, the house built in 1845 for Lucius J. Polk's brother George Washington Polk.

== See also ==
- Ashwood Hall
- Rattle and Snap
