= Pine Hill (Ashwood, Tennessee) =

- U.S. National Register of Historic Places
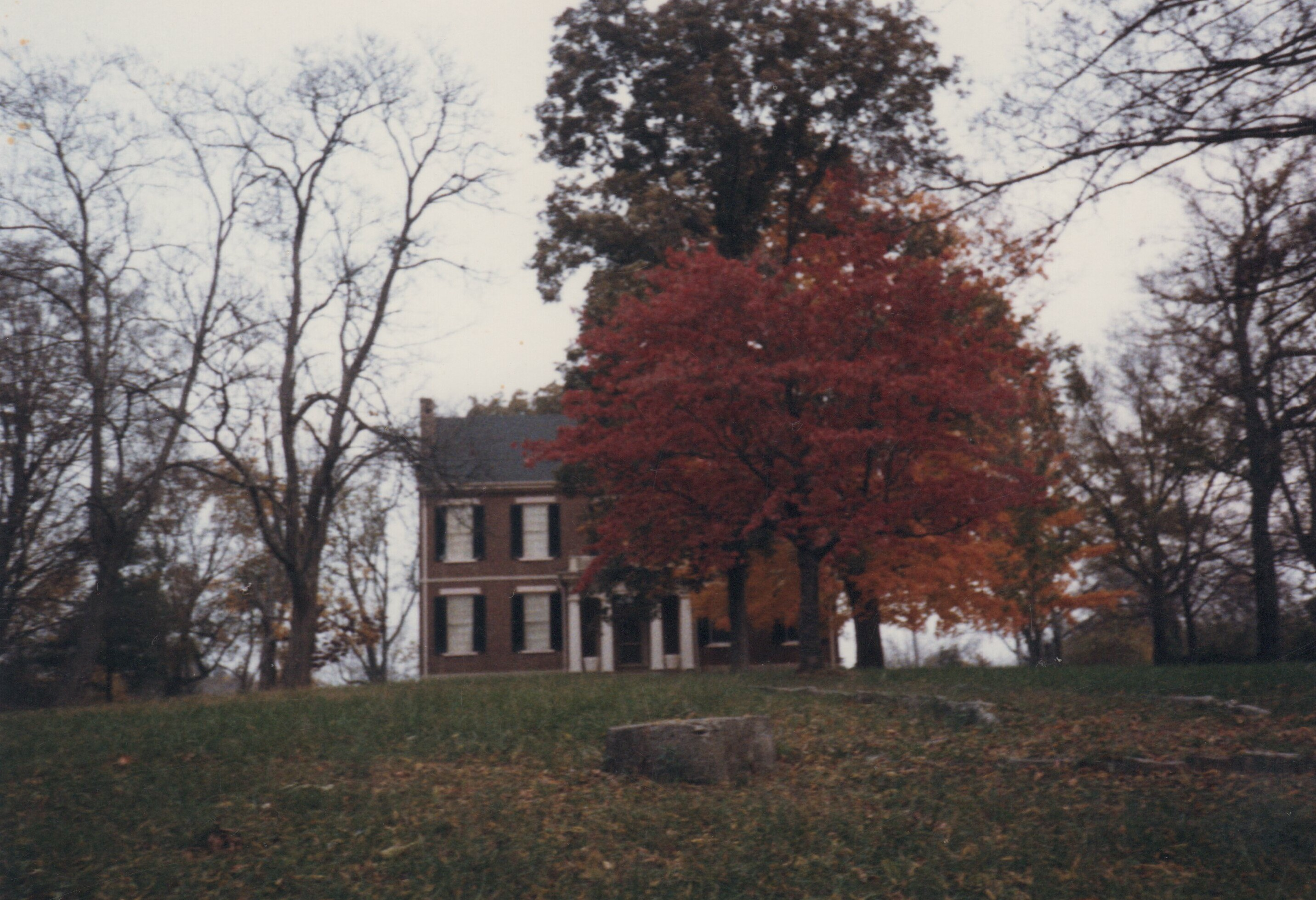

- Location within Tennessee Location within the United States
- Nearest city: Ashwood, Tennessee
- Coordinates: 35°35′11″N 87°07′39″W
- Area: 1.3 acres (0.53 ha)
- Built: 1839
- Architectural style: Federal, Federal vernacular
- NRHP reference No.: 83004272
- Added to NRHP: December 15, 1983

Pine Hill is a historic mansion in Ashwood, Tennessee, U.S.. It was built in 1839 for Samuel Henry Armstrong, a wheat, corn and tobacco farmer. It was purchased by the Dixon family in 1869.

The house was designed in the Federal architectural style, with a Greek Revival portico. It has been listed on the National Register of Historic Places since December 15, 1983.
