= Absalom Thompson House =

Historic house in Tennessee, United States

- U.S. National Register of Historic Places
- Location within Tennessee Location within the United States
- Nearest city: Spring Hill, Tennessee
- Coordinates: 35°43′19″N 86°55′47″W
- Area: less than one acre
- Built: 1835
- Built by: Nathan Vaught
- Architectural style: Greek Revival, Federal
- NRHP reference No.: 79002449
- Added to NRHP: September 11, 1979

The Absalom Thompson House is a historic house located two miles south of Spring Hill, Tennessee.

== Description and history ==
Built in 1835 for Absalom Thompson, this brick house was originally a Federal style, 1 1/2-story ell-shaped structure. The house was most likely built by Nathan Vaught, a master craftsman who built or re-modelled many houses in Maury County. Around 1860, the house was changed to a two-story dwelling with Greek Revival features. It has an early flat roof and a 3-bay symmetrical facade (south elevation), and is painted white. The earlier, first floor section of the house is laid in Flemish bond, and the second story, raised around 1860, is laid in American common bond. Four exterior brick chimneys are located in pairs on the east and west elevations of the main section of the house, and two brick chimneys are located on the ell: one is an original, interior chimney, and the other, a new exterior chimney at the north end of the ell.

It was listed on the National Register of Historic Places on September 11, 1979.
