= Rattle and snap (game) =

American dice game

Rattle and snap was a game of chance played with dice that was popular in the United States in the 18th and 19th centuries. One source says rattle and snap was similar to the game of craps. People gambled cash and property on the outcome, as they did with card games like faro. Andrew Jackson reportedly made $200 and "saved his horse from having a new owner" playing rattle and snap in Charleston, South Carolina in the 1780s. The Rattle and Snap plantation was named for William Polk's fortunate roll of the dice while playing the game shortly after the American Revolutionary War. In 1857 a Lynchburg, Virginia newspaper complained about "gambling hells" where the popular games included "crack-lew, rattle-and-snap, all-fours, bluff, (Note: "Bluff" was the name of poker at the time period of the quote.) eucre, &c &c." The game was popular in Charleston's black community until the American Civil War. Gaming venues where "seven up, rattle-and-snap, pitch-and-toss, or chuck-a-luck" were played were more commonly sites of interracial intersection than were many other sectors of the antebellum U.S. south.

An 1865 column about the speculative nature of oil stocks described the game as it had been played in olden times in Maryland:

An individual with a fine cast of countenance presided at the head of the table, dice-box in hand and the betters formed a circle round the table, with the amounts they had put to hazard on the green cloth before them, each betting his pile on "in" or "out." The man with the box cast the dice, and if the number of points cast were ten or less, the "ins" won, but if eleven or more the "outs" raked down the money. This game of rattle-and-snap was brought back to our remembrance by the extensive game, or swindle, now going on in oil stocks. In our opinion one's chance of winning is about the same in both. If you are on intimate terms with the man who holds the dice-box you may go "in" and win, but if you hav'nt the honor of his acquaintance you had better stay "out"' and save your money.

There was an American schooner called Rattle and Snap, based out of North Carolina, that sank in the Delaware River in 1808.
