= Rattle and Snap =

Historic house in Tennessee, United States

- U.S. National Register of Historic Places
- U.S. National Historic Landmark
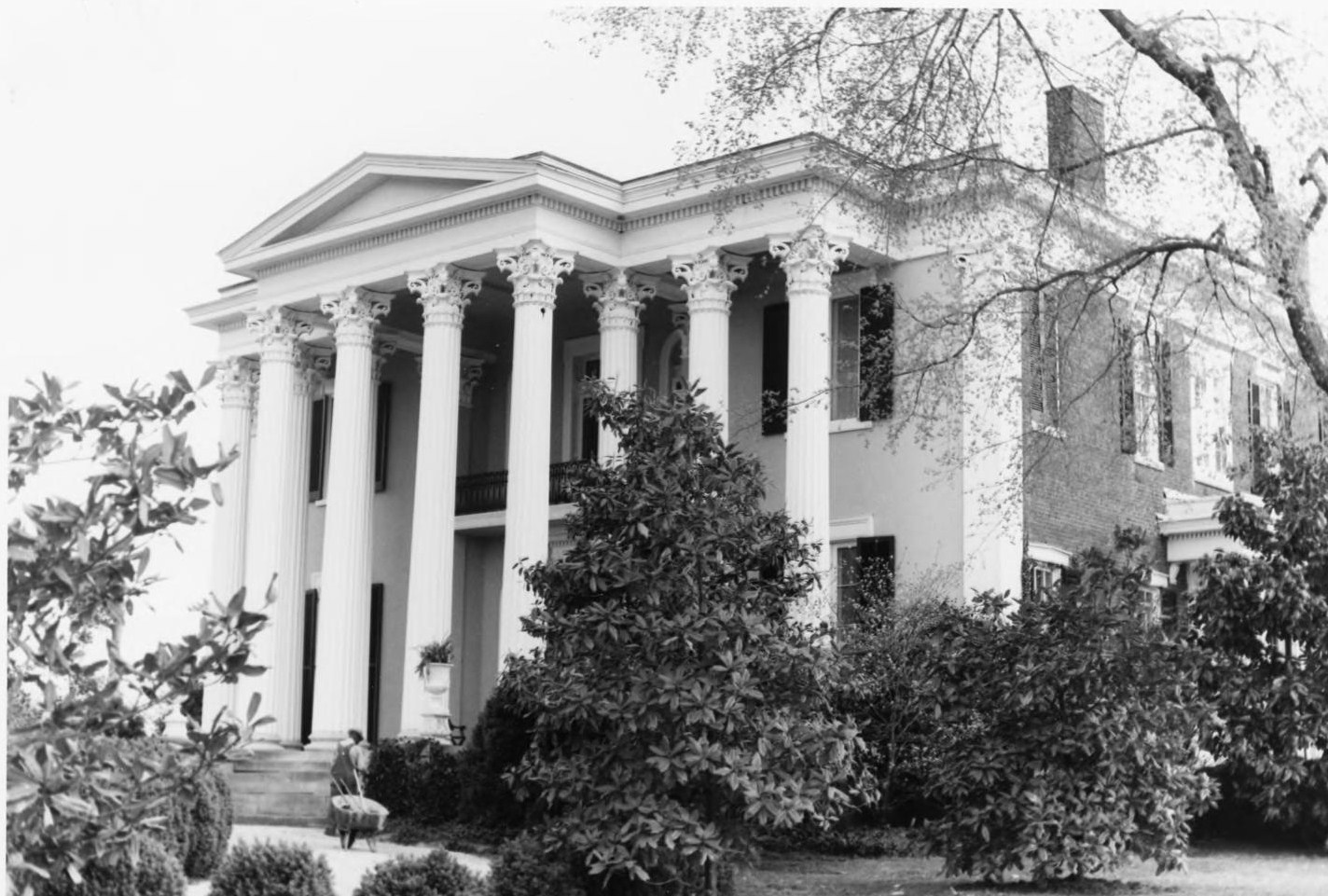
- Rattle and Snap in 1971

- Location within Tennessee Location within the United States
- Interactive map showing the location of Rattle & Snap
- Location: 1522 North Main St., Mount Pleasant, Tennessee
- Coordinates: 35°33′42″N 87°9′22″W
- Area: 519 acres (210 ha)
- Built: 1845
- Architectural style: Greek Revival
- NRHP reference No.: 71000825

Significant dates
- Added to NRHP: November 11, 1971
- Designated NHL: November 11, 1971

Rattle and Snap (also called the Polk-Granberry House and once known as Oakwood Hall) is a plantation estate at 1522 North Main Street in Mount Pleasant, Tennessee. The centerpiece of the estate is a mid-1840s mansion that is one of grandest expressions of the Greek Revival in Tennessee. It was designated a National Historic Landmark in 1971 for its architecture, and for its association with the Polk family, once one of middle Tennessee's largest landowners. The house is privately owned, but may be viewed by appointment.

== Description ==
Rattle and Snap is located on the south side of Andrew Jackson Highway (Tennessee State Route 243), roughly midway between the city centers of Mount Pleasant and Columbia; it is located at the eastern edge of the Mount Pleasant municipal boundary. The estate is presently more than 500 acres (200 ha) in size.

The main mansion house is a large two-story brick building covered by a shallow hip roof. It is L-shaped, with a long front facade covered by a stepped two-story colonnade, and with the brick finished in stucco. The center portion of the colonnade is fully pedimented four-column Greek temple portico, which projects forward from flanking pairs of columns, and another pair of columns set behind the end columns of the temple front. The interior of the house retains rich woodwork and plaster decorations in the Greek Revival style.

== History ==
It was built in 1845 by George Washington Polk, one of the sons of Colonel William Polk and a relative of President James K. Polk. His father was a North Carolina native and Revolutionary War officer who was appointed surveyor-general of the Middle District of Tennessee in 1784. The plantation originally stood on 5,648 acres (2,286 ha). Rattle and Snap was built with slave labor and is the largest, most extravagant mansion in Maury County. George Polk and his family lived in this mansion for fifteen years, selling it in 1867 to Joseph Granberry. The Granberrys owned the property until about 1920, calling it "Oakwood Hall".

During the American Civil War, many plantations and mansions in the South were either looted or burned by Union soldiers. Rattle and Snap survived, allegedly because the senior Union Army officer, a Freemason, noticed Polk's Masonic ring in his formal portrait and refused to damage the home of a fellow Freemason. After the war, the Polk family went bankrupt and could not afford the land or the mansion; Rattle and Snap was sold to Joseph John Granbery in 1867. The Granberys lived in the mansion for over fifty years.

It is said to have been given its name from the fact that the land on which it was built was won from the Governor of North Carolina in a game of chance called 'Rattle and Snap'.

It was designated a National Historic Landmark in 1971.

== See also ==
- Hamilton Place (Columbia, Tennessee)
- Ashwood Hall
- List of National Historic Landmarks in Tennessee
- National Register of Historic Places listings in Maury County, Tennessee
