= Ashwood Hall =

Plantation in Tennessee, United States

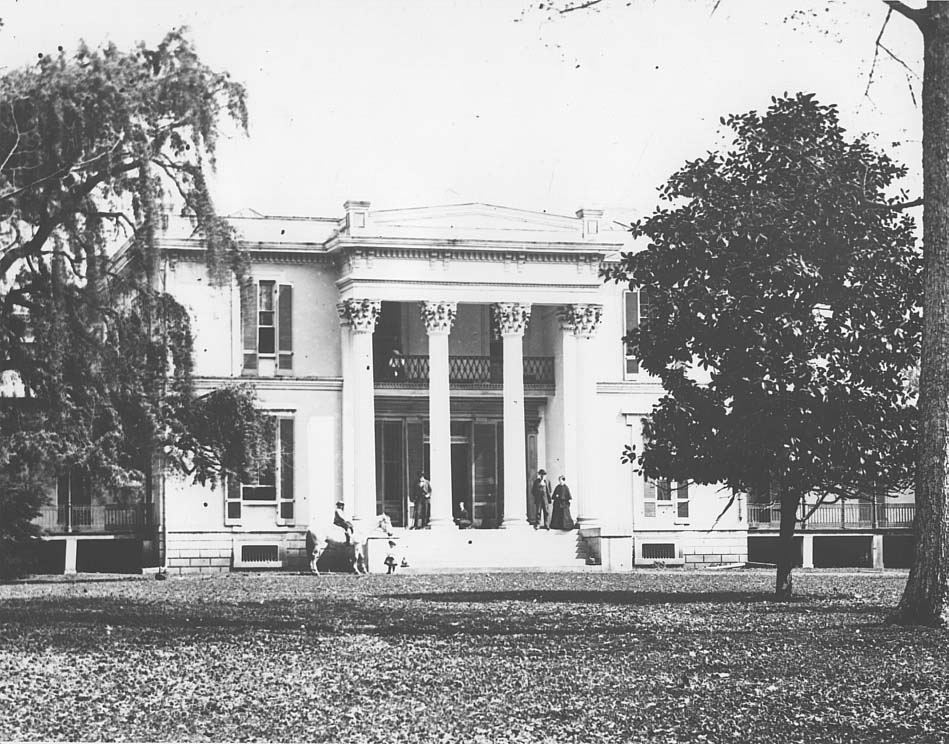
- Interactive map of the Ashwood Hall area

General information
- Status: Demolished
- Coordinates: 35.57294°N 87.13703°W
- Client: Leonidas Polk

Ashwood Hall was a Southern plantation in Maury County, Tennessee.

== Location ==
The plantation was located in Ashwood, a small town near Columbia in Maury County, Tennessee.

== History ==
The land belonged to Colonel William Polk. The mansion was built for one of his sons, Bishop Leonidas Polk, from 1833 to 1837. Opposite the mansion, Leonidas Polk built St. John's Episcopal Church from 1839 to 1842.

In 1847, Leonidas Polk sold the mansion to Rebecca Van Leer. Rebecca was a heiress to an iron fortune and a member of the Van Leer family. She had married one of his brothers, Andrew Jackson Polk, in 1846.The mansion was sold for US$35,000. Andrew and his wife spent another US$35,000 on expansions and refurbishments. Their children, Van Leer Polk and Antoinette Van Leer Polk, grew up at the mansion.

On July 5, 1861, at the outset of the American Civil War, Andrew Jackson Polk, who was elected Captain, organized the Maury County Braves in a grove on the grounds of Ashwood Hall.

In 1862, Antoinette Polk saved Confederate personnel stationed at Ashwood Hall by warning them that Northern forces were coming their way. As a result, she became known as a "Southern heroine."

It burned down in 1874.

== See also ==
- Hamilton Place (Columbia, Tennessee)
- Rattle and Snap
