= Bessie Alexander Ficklen =

American writer, artist

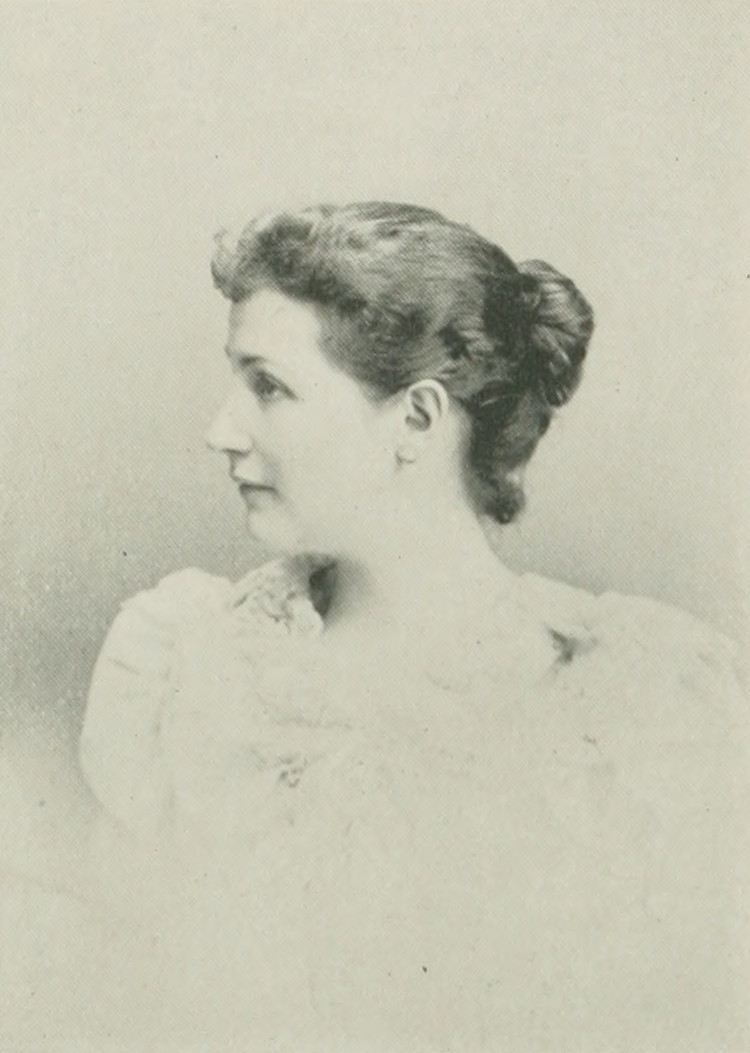
- Photo in A Woman of the Century
- Born: Bessie Mason Alexander; November 10, 1861; Fredericksburg, Virginia, C.S.
- Died: March 2, 1945 (aged 83); Chatham County, Georgia, U.S.
- Education: Columbia Female Institute
- Occupations: Poet, hand-puppeteer
- Spouse: John Rose Ficklen (m. 1886; died 1907)
- Children: 2
- Writing career
- Notable work: "A handbook of fist puppets"

Bessie Alexander Ficklen (née, Alexander; November 10, 1861 – March 3, 1945) was an American poet and artist. Her essay on "Dream Poetry", appeared in one of the leading magazines of the 19th-century and attracted much attention. She wrote more for pleasure than for any monetary gain. She was also quite as clever with drawing-pencils as with her pen, and from time to time, for private circulation, published little books of rhyme—simple, jesting doggerel—written and illustrated by her own hand. She was a hand puppeteer, creating them for several decades and writing a book on the subject.

== Biography ==
Bessie Mason Alexander was born near Fredericksburg, Virginia, November 10, 1861. Her mother was B. M. Alexander and her maiden name was Mason. On her father's side, she is of Scotch descent. Her great-grandfather, a graduate of University of Edinburgh, emigrated from Scotland to the United States in Colonial days. He settled in Georgia and served as a surgeon in the American Revolutionary War. Ficklen's father, General Edward Porter Alexander, was educated at West Point, and, after completing the course of study there, entered the United States Army Corps of Engineers. On the breaking out of the Civil War, he enlisted in the Confederate States Army, and served with distinction as James Longstreet's chief of artillery.

Ficklen was graduated from the Columbia Female Institute, Columbia, Tennessee.

On December 28, 1886, she married John Rose Ficklen (1858–1907), professor of history in Tulane University, New Orleans, Louisiana. On the opening of the art school in H. Sophie Newcomb Memorial College, in New Orleans, Ficklen became a student there, showing special excellence in the direction of drawing and modeling. In the latter department, she did some good work, notably the head of a child, shown at the autumnal exhibition in 1891. In 1889, was published "Catterel, Ratterel, Doggerel", a set of satirical verses composed by General Alexander; the clever illustrations which accompanied these humorous verses were the work of Ficklen. An essay of Ficklen's, entitled "Dream-Poetry", appeared in Scribner's Magazine in 1891.

On April 14, 1928 and April 28, 1928, she exhibited at the 1st Allied Arts Exhibition of Dallas County, Texas.

Ficklen made hand puppets at various times in her life, when she was a child, mother, and grandmother. She also authored the book, A Handbook of Fist-Puppets (1935). A film regarding Ficklen included the subject of puppets.

The Ficklens had two children, Porter Alexander (born 1887), and Elizabeth Fitzhugh (born 1890).

Bessie Ficklen died March 3, 1945. (Note: According to Usgwarchives, she died in Dallas County, Texas, September 16, 1981.)

== Selected works ==
- Dream-poetry, 1891
- A handbook of fist puppets
