= State Bank of Tennessee =

- U.S. National Register of Historic Places
- Location within Tennessee Location within the United States
- Location: 201 W. 7th St., Columbia, Tennessee
- Coordinates: 35°36′53″N 87°2′9″W
- Area: 0.2 acres (0.081 ha)
- Built: 1839
- Built by: Nathan Vaught
- Architectural style: Greek Revival
- NRHP reference No.: 78002611
- Added to NRHP: November 2, 1978

The State Bank of Tennessee building is a historic building in Columbia, Tennessee, USA. It was built by Nathan Vaught from 1839 to 1840. It was designed in the Greek Revival architectural style. It has been listed on the National Register of Historic Places since November 2, 1978.

The building was a branch of the Third Bank of Tennessee, established in 1838 to finance infrastructure projects and public schools. The branch's history was brief and troubled; it was robbed soon after it opened and it failed in 1843, after which the building held private tenants.
