= Athenaeum (Tennessee) =

Historic house in Tennessee, United States

- The Athenaeum
- U.S. National Register of Historic Places
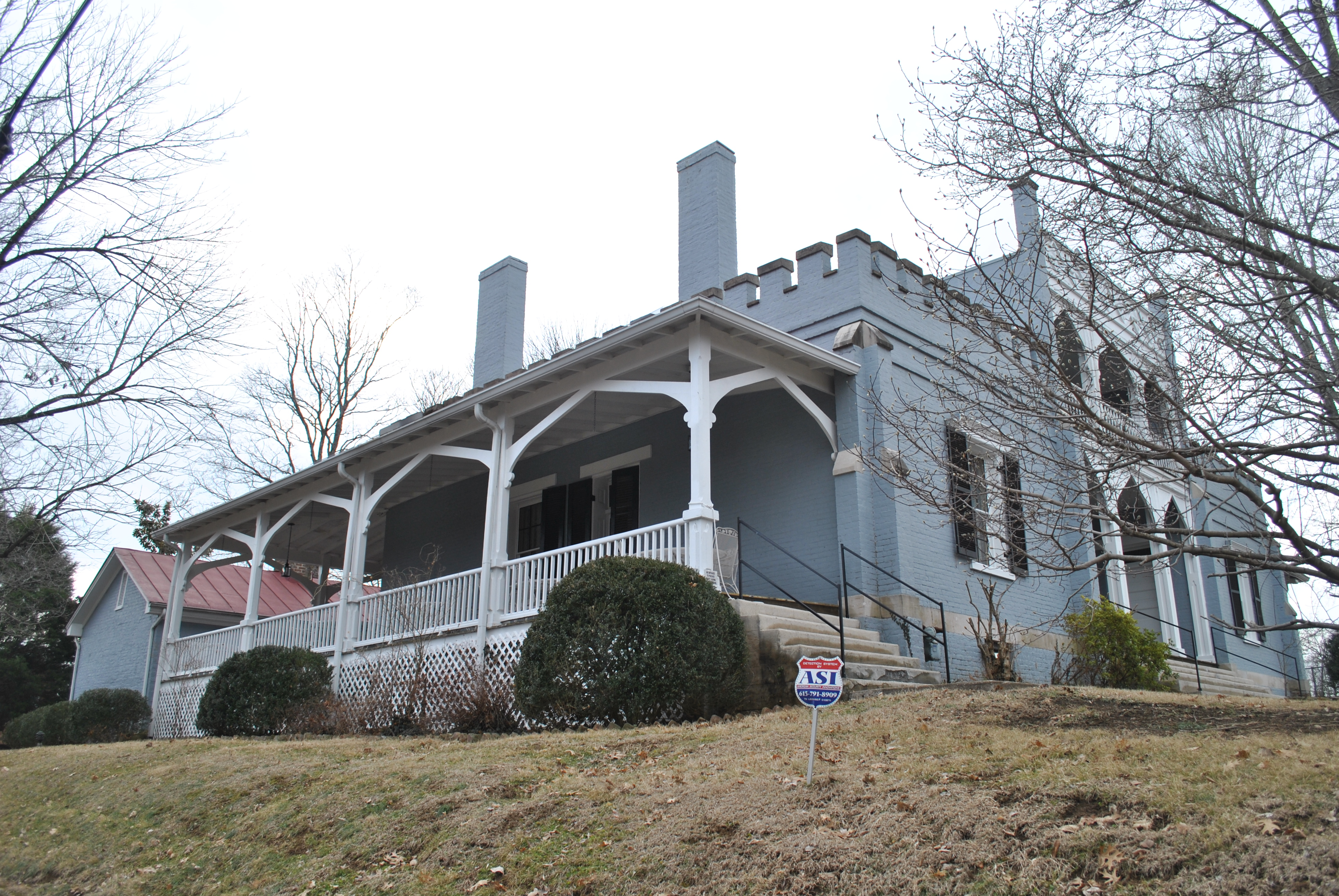

- Location within Tennessee Location within the United States
- Location: Columbia, TN
- Coordinates: 35°36′50.98″N 87°2′29.02″W
- Built: 1838
- Built by: Nathan Vaught
- Architect: Adolphus Heiman
- Architectural style: Exotic Revival, Gothic Revival
- NRHP reference No.: 73001809
- Added to NRHP: April 24, 1973

The Athenaeum Rectory is a historic building in Columbia, Tennessee that features both Gothic and Moorish architectural elements. Completed in 1837, the building originally served as the rectory for the Columbia Female Institute and as the residence of the school's first president, the Reverend Franklin Gillette Smith. The structure was added to the National Register of Historic Places in 1973.

== History ==
The structure, later to be known as the Athenaeum Rectory, was originally intended to be the residence of Samuel Polk Walker, nephew of President James K. Polk. Construction commenced in 1835.

=== Rectory of the Columbia Female Institute ===
By the time construction was completed in 1837, the intended resident had been changed to the Reverend Franklin Gillette Smith (1797–1866) who came to Tennessee to serve as the president of the Columbia Female Institute, an Episcopal school for female students.

In 1851, the Rev. Smith resigned from the Columbia Female Institute due to alleged improprieties with a student. The authority who asked for his resignation was the Institute's co-founder, Rt. Rev. James Hervey Otey, the first Bishop of the Episcopal Diocese of Tennessee. Stung by a general backlash from Smith's local supporters, Bishop Otey moved his family and his administrative base to Memphis, Tennessee, which continued as the seat of Tennessee's bishops, informally and formally, until 1982, when the Episcopal Diocese of West Tennessee was created.

=== Rectory of the Columbia Athenaeum School ===
Still committed to his educational mission, Rev. Smith soon founded the Columbia Athenaeum School on property adjacent to the Columbia Female Institute. The Athenaeum Rectory continued to serve as the residence for the Smith family and housed reception areas for the newly founded school. The Columbia Athenaeum continued to operate until 1903. During its 52 years of operation, the school developed a national reputation for the breadth and quality of its curriculum. Reverend Smith believed that the intelligence level of women was equivalent to that of men and offered courses that were traditionally available only to men, such as calculus, physics, and marine biology. The main school complex consisted of twelve buildings.

Once the school had ceased operation, the property was sold by the Smith heirs. The facilities housed a local high school until 1914. In 1915, the City of Columbia constructed a new high school on the property.

Members of the Smith family continued to occupy the Athenaeum Rectory until 1973 when it was donated to the Association for the Preservation of Tennessee Antiquities for use by the residents of Maury County. Today, the rectory is operated as a historic house museum. In addition, a small cottage that Reverend Smith used as a study survives to this day. Events are held twice annually which recreate the educational experiences of young women at the female institute.

== Architectural significance ==
The Athenaeum Rectory features elements from a variety of architectural styles: Gothic, Moorish, Greek Revival, Italianate, and others. The structure was designed by Adolphus Heiman, an architect of the early 19th century who designed many buildings in the Middle Tennessee area. Nathan Vaught, a master builder from Maury County, was responsible for construction of the building.

The renovated home is open for guided tours.

== Notable people ==
- Bessie Alexander Ficklen (1861–1945), writer, poet, artist
- Loraine Bedsole Bush Tunstall (1881-1953), social reformer

== In popular culture ==
=== Television ===
The Athenaeum was featured as a haunted location on the paranormal series, Haunted Live which aired in 2018 on the Travel Channel. The paranormal team, the Tennessee Wraith Chasers investigated the former headmaster's house, which is said to be haunted.
