= Fairmont (Columbia, Tennessee) =

Historic house in Tennessee, United States

- U.S. National Register of Historic Places
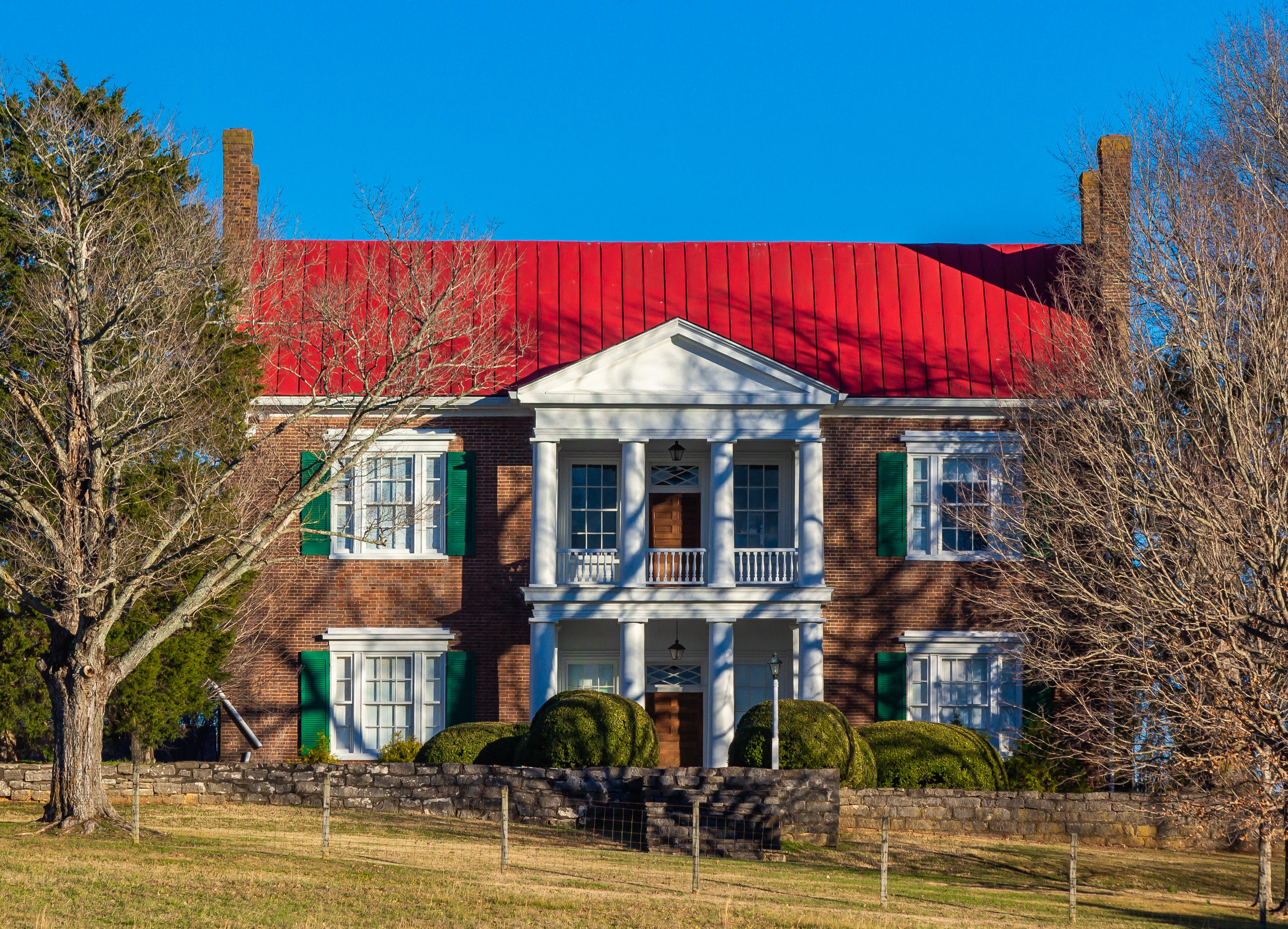
- Fairmont

- Location within Tennessee Location within the United States
- Location: Columbia, Tennessee, U.S.
- Coordinates: 35°35′10″N 87°1′31″W
- Area: less than one acre
- Built: 1837
- Architect: Nathan Vaught
- Architectural style: Greek Revival
- NRHP reference No.: 83003052
- Added to NRHP: September 1, 1983

Fairmont is a historic mansion in Columbia, Tennessee, USA.

== History ==
Construction on the two-story mansion began in 1831, and it was completed in 1837. It was built for John Smiser, a lawyer from Hagerstown, Maryland who practised the law in Natchez, Mississippi and served as the sheriff of Williamson County, Tennessee, and his wife, Mary Evie Turtey, a native of Paris, Kentucky.

After the Smisers died and were buried on the property in 1840, the mansion was inherited by their daughter Ellen and her husband, James Gray Booker, the son of large planter Peter R. Booker, Sr. (1784-1839). By 1853, Booker's brother-in-law and his four daughters, who had died of yellow fever in New Orleans, Louisiana, were buried on the property.

The mansion was acquired by Lex Watson (1892-1951) in 1931. It was later repurposed as a retirement facility, until it became a private residence once again.

== Architectural significance ==
The mansion was designed by architect Nathan Vaught in the Greek Revival architectural style. It has been listed on the National Register of Historic Places since September 1, 1983.
