= Clifton Place (Columbia, Tennessee) =

Historic house in Tennessee, United States

- U.S. National Register of Historic Places
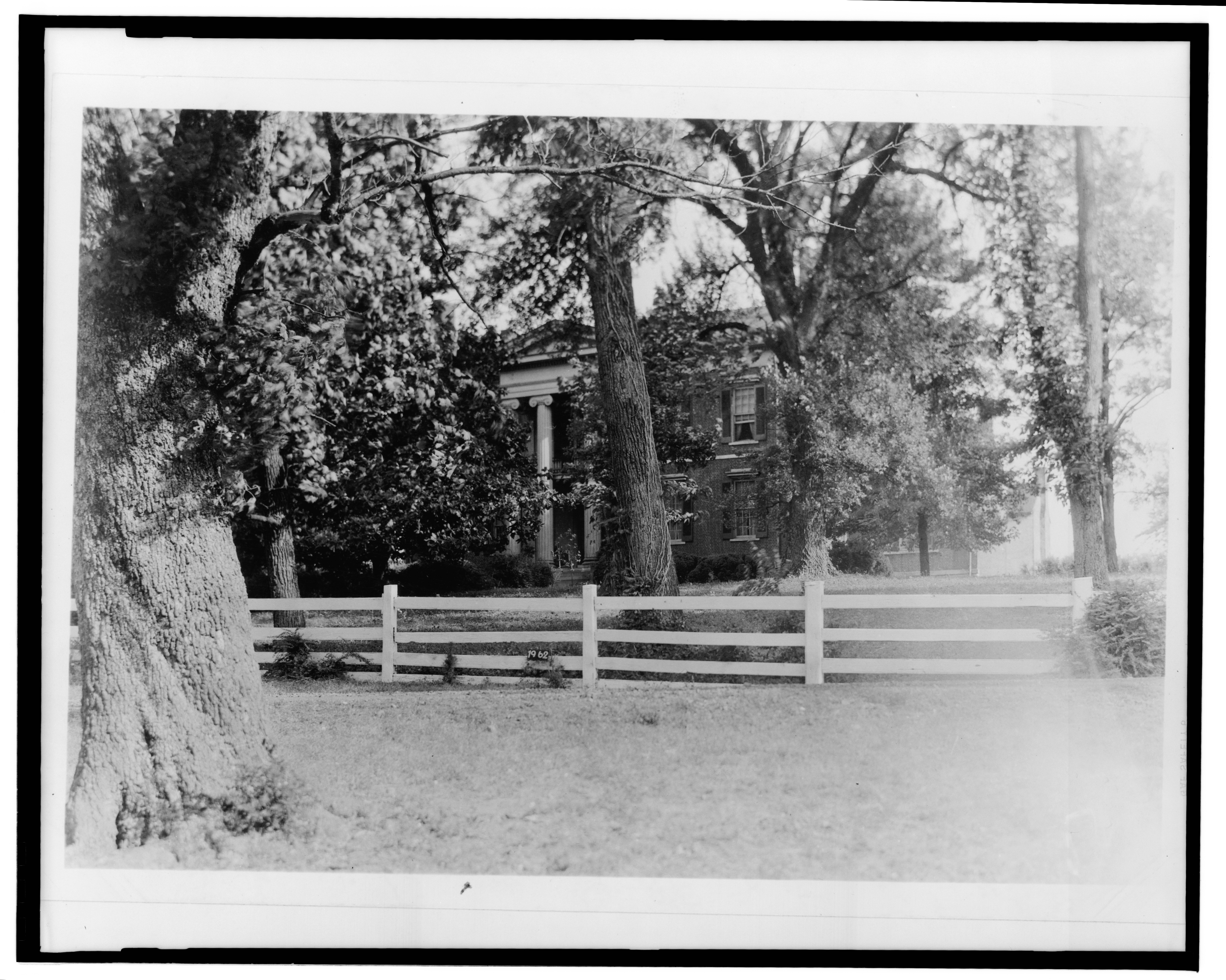
- West elevation of the main building - June 6, 1936

- Location within Tennessee Location within the United States
- Nearest city: Columbia, Tennessee
- Coordinates: 35°34′40″N 87°06′52″W
- Built: 1839
- Architect: Nathan Vaught
- Architectural style: Ante bellum/ Greek Revival
- NRHP reference No.: 70000613
- Added to NRHP: July 8, 1970

Clifton Place is an historic plantation mansion located southwest of the city of Columbia, Maury County, Tennessee on the Mt. Pleasant Pike (Columbia highway). Master builder Nathan Vaught started construction in 1838, and the mansion and other buildings were completed in 1839, for Gideon Johnson Pillow (1806-1877) on land inherited from Gideon Pillow.

== History ==
Clifton Place was the first of three mansions built for the Pillow brothers by Vaught. Pillow-Bethel House (Bethel House) was built for Jerome Bonaparte Pillow and Pillow Place (Pillow-Haliday) for Major Granville A. Pillow. The two story mansion had a two-room attic, a two-room basement and a supply cellar. Single story side-wings were added in 1846. There was an office and separated kitchen. Other service buildings such as a smokehouse, carriage house, more than one barn, farm buildings, and slave quarters were built away from the main house. In 1852 the roof was raised and a pedimented portico supported by columns was added to the facade.

Son-in-law Melville Williams took over the plantation in 1872, and another relative Colonel J. W. S. Ridley, purchased the property in 1877, and Ridley family members owned the plantation until 1972.

The mansion was placed on the National Register of Historic Places listings in Maury County, Tennessee on July 8, 1970.
