= Lucius Junius Polk =

American politician

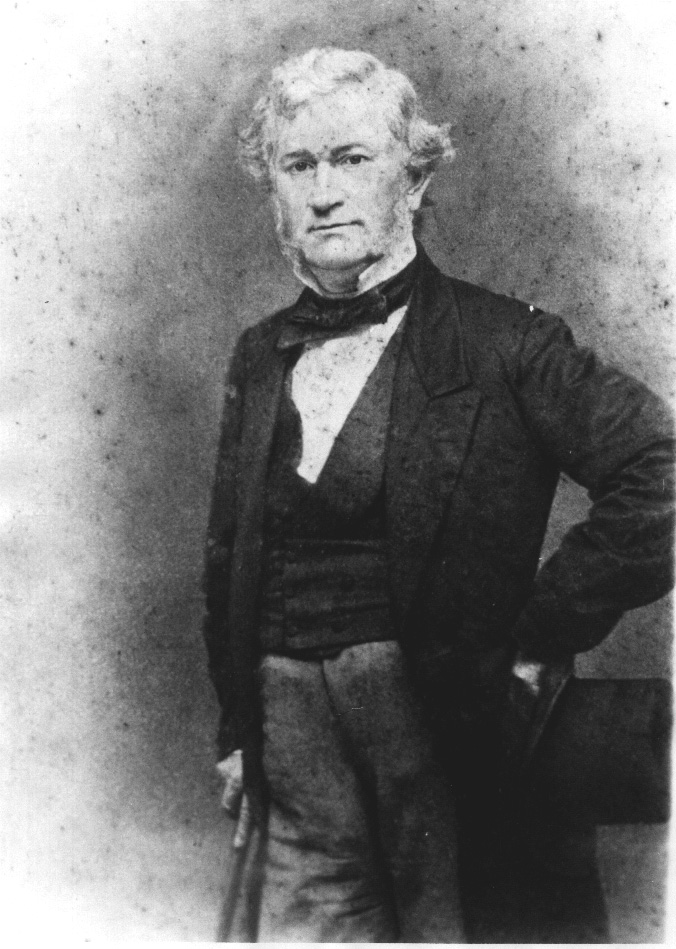
- Polk in the 1860s
- Born: March 16, 1802
- Died: October 3, 1870 (aged 68)
- Occupations: Politician, planter
- Spouse(s): Mary Ann Eastin, d. 1847; Frances Anne Erwin, d. 1858
- Children: 9 who survived infancy
- Parent: William Polk
- Relatives: Leonidas Polk (brother); Lucius E. Polk (nephew)

Lucius Junius Polk (1802–1870) was an American politician and planter from Tennessee.

== Early life ==
Lucius Junius Polk was born in 1802 in Raleigh, North Carolina. His father was Colonel William Polk. He moved to Maury County, Tennessee, in 1823.

== Career ==
Polk served in the Tennessee Senate from 1831 to 1833. He served as Adjutant General for the state of Tennessee from 1851 to 1853.

Polk was also a wealthy cotton planter. He owned 30 slaves in 1836 and 52 slaves in 1840.

He was a Knight Templar.

== Personal life ==
Polk married Mary Ann Eastin, a grand-niece of Rachel Jackson (the wife of President Andrew Jackson) in April 1832. Their wedding took place at the White House in Washington, D.C. They resided at Hamilton Place near Columbia, Tennessee, and had a large family together.

After Mary Ann Polk had died, Lucius married Frances Anne Erwin, with whom he had an additional son and daughter. Frances Polk also died in her 30s.

== Death ==
He died in 1870. He was buried on the grounds of St. John's Episcopal Church.
