= Ashwood, Tennessee =

Coordinates: 35.5795°N 87.1439°W

- Unincorporated community
- Interactive map of Ashwood, Tennessee
- Country: United States
- State: Tennessee
- County: Maury

Ashwood is an unincorporated community in Maury County, Tennessee, in the United States. Most of the community has been annexed by the city of Mount Pleasant.

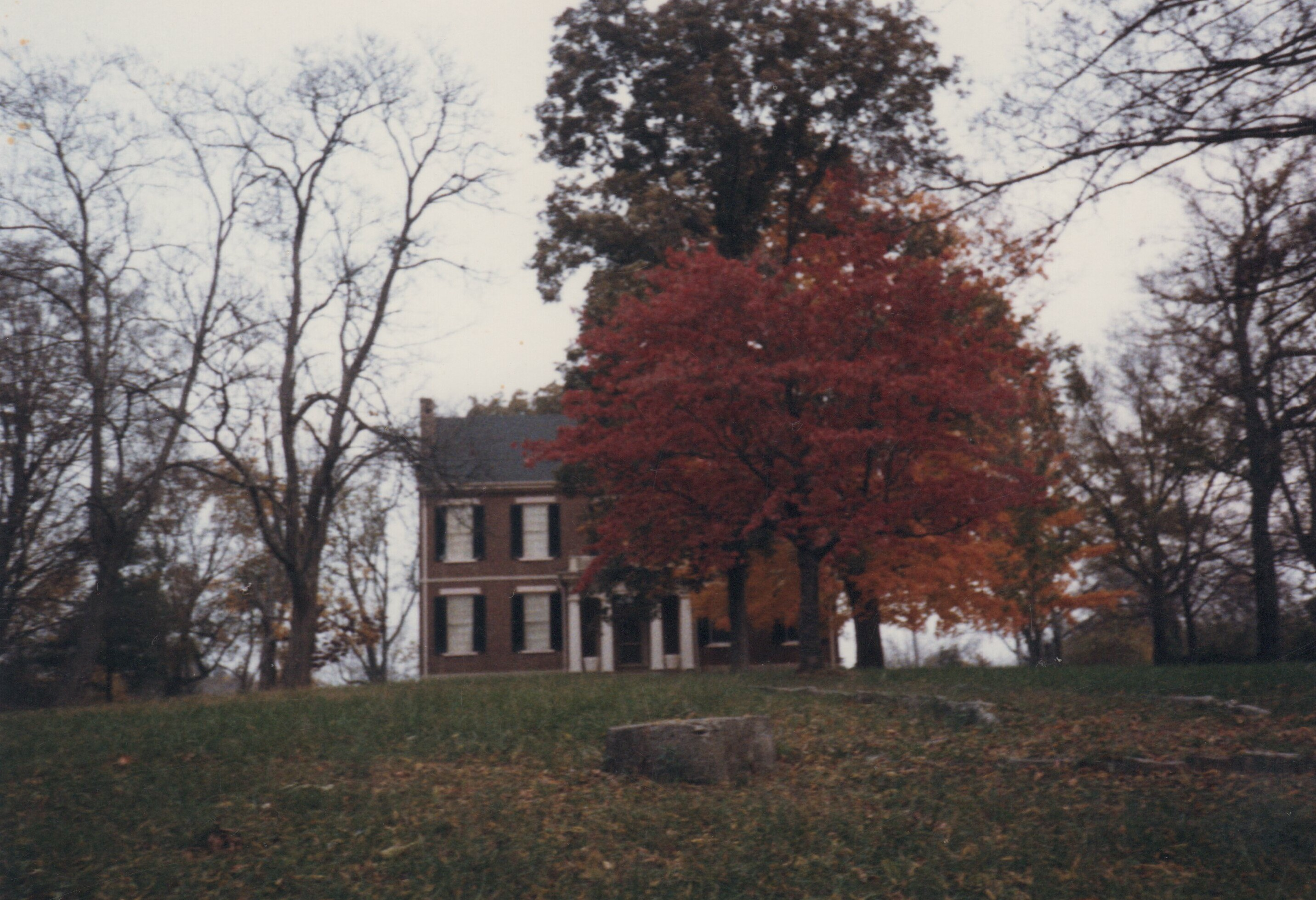
Pine Hill.

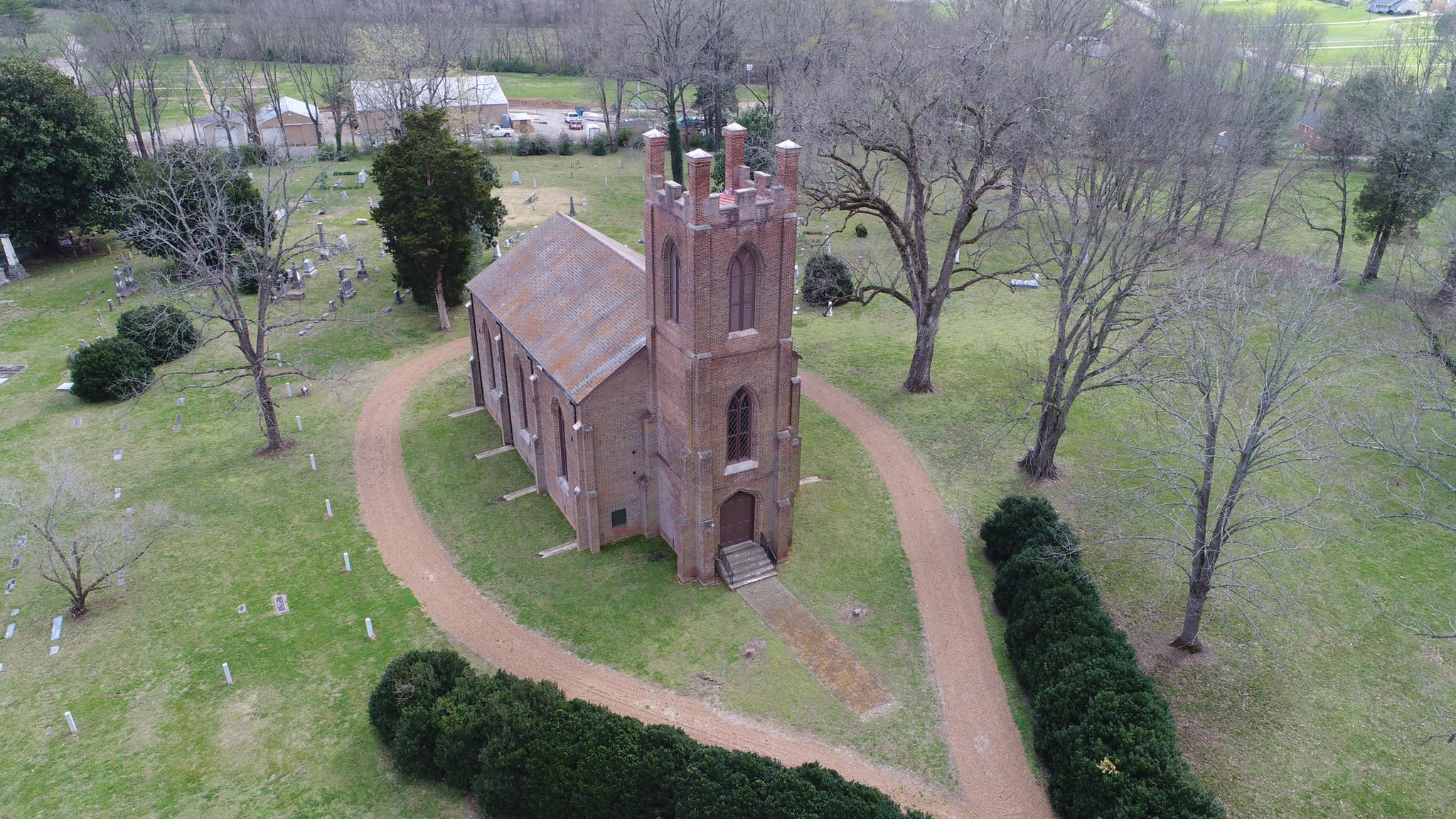
St. John's Episcopal Church.

== Location ==
It is located six miles southwest of Columbia, Tennessee.

== History ==
Ashwood Hall, Bishop Leonidas Polk's plantation house, was built in the community in 1833–1837. Another mansion, Pine Hill, was built here in 1838. St. John's Episcopal Church, listed on the National Register of Historic Places, was built from 1839 to 1842.

A post office called Ashwood was established in 1841. The community derives its name from the Ashwood Hall plantation. In the 1840s, the community included a "gristmill, hemp factory, sawmill, and other Polk enterprises."

The post office closed down in 1956.
